= 2011 Pacific typhoon season =

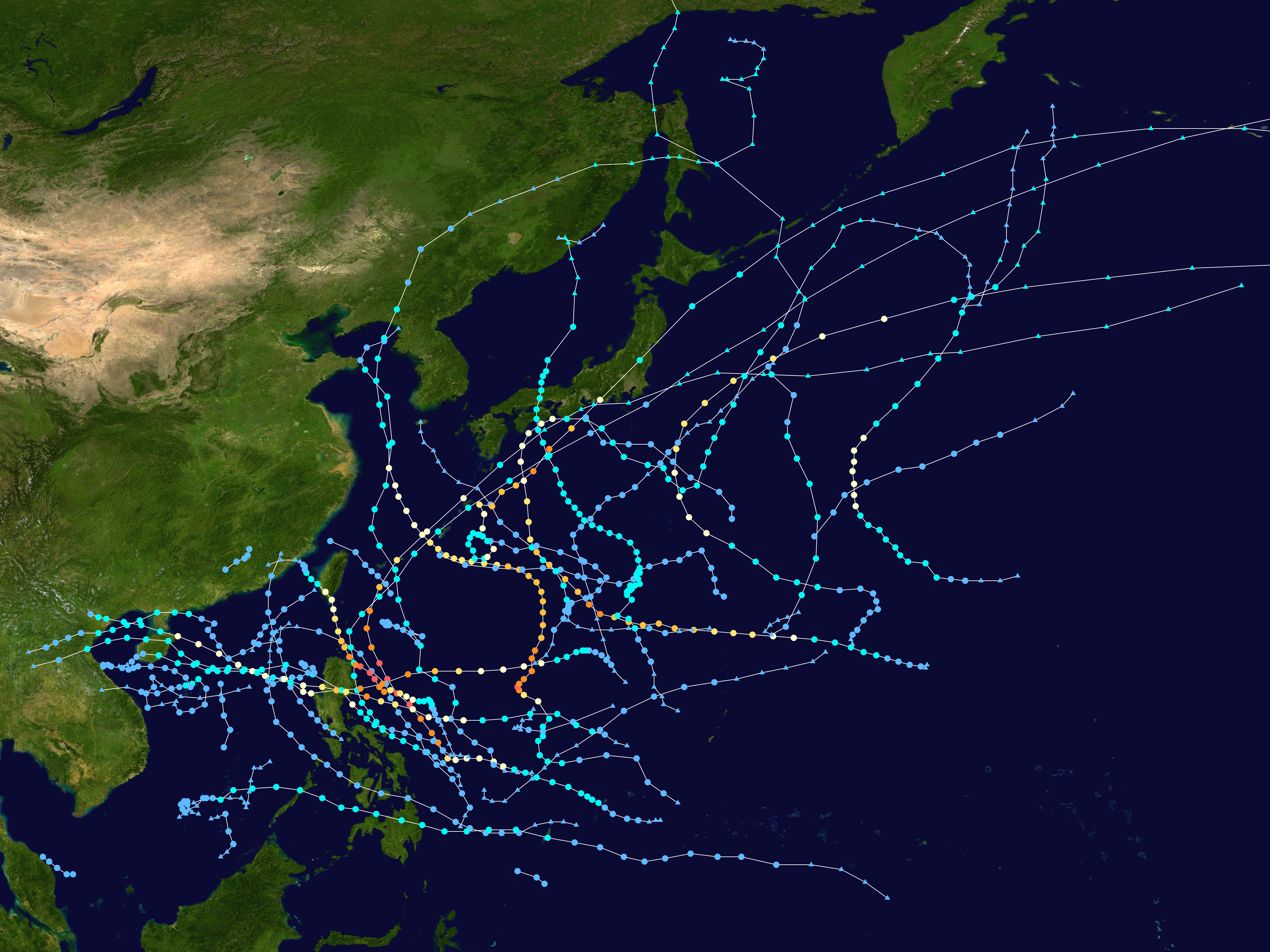
- Season summary map

Seasonal boundaries
- First system formed: April 1, 2011
- Last system dissipated: January 1, 2012

Strongest storm
- Name: Songda
  - Maximum winds: 195 km/h (120 mph) (10-minute sustained)
  - Lowest pressure: 920 hPa (mbar)

Seasonal statistics
- Total depressions: 39
- Total storms: 21
- Typhoons: 8
- Very strong typhoons: 6
- Violent typhoons: 1
- Total fatalities: 3,111 total
- Total damage: $7.48 billion (2011 USD)

Related articles
- Timeline of the 2011 Pacific typhoon season; 2011 Atlantic hurricane season; 2011 Pacific hurricane season; 2011 North Indian Ocean cyclone season

The 2011 Pacific typhoon season was a below average season that produced a total of 21 named storms, 8 typhoons, and four super typhoons. This season was much more active than the previous season, although both seasons were below the Pacific typhoon average of 26. The season ran throughout 2011, though most tropical cyclone tend to develop between May and October. The season's first named storm, Aere, developed on May 7 while the season's last named storm, Washi dissipated on December 19.

The season was also much deadlier and destructive than the previous season. Typhoon Muifa affected many countries during August. Tropical Storm Talas and Typhoon Roke made landfall over in Japan and were the most destructive since 2009. Typhoon Nesat was the most powerful to strike China since 2008. Tropical Storm Washi, a late but weak cyclone, affected southern Philippines and killed 2546 people.

The scope of this article is limited to the Pacific Ocean to the north of the equator between 100th meridian east and the 180th meridian. Within the Northwestern Pacific Ocean, there are two separate agencies who assign names to tropical cyclones which can often result in a cyclone having two names. The Japan Meteorological Agency will name a tropical cyclone should it be judged to have 10-minute sustained wind speeds of at least 65 km/h (40 mph) anywhere in the basin. Whilst the Philippine Atmospheric, Geophysical and Astronomical Services Administration assigns names to tropical cyclones which move into or form as a tropical depression in their area of responsibility located between 135°E and 115°E and between 5°N-25°N even if the cyclone has had a name assigned to it by the Japan Meteorological Agency. Tropical depressions that are monitored by the United States' Joint Typhoon Warning Center are given a number with a "W" suffix.

== Seasonal forecasts ==
TSR forecasts Date	Tropical storms	Total Typhoons	Intense TCs	ACE	Ref
Average (1965–2010)	26.3	16.4	8.5	295	
March 8, 2011	27.8	17.5	7.8	275	
May 5, 2011	28.0	17.7	7.6	266	
July 4, 2011	28.3	18.1	8.4	294	
August 5, 2011	28.2	17.9	8.0	281	
Other forecasts Date	Forecast Center	Period		Systems	Ref
January 2011	PAGASA	January 1 – December 31		20–23 tropical cyclones	
June 30, 2011	CWB	January 1 – December 31		22–26 tropical storms	
	Forecast Center	Tropical cyclones	Tropical storms	Typhoons	Ref
Actual activity:	JMA	38	21	8	
Actual activity:	JTWC	27	18	10	
Actual activity:	PAGASA	19	14	6	

During each season, several national meteorological services and scientific agencies forecast how many tropical cyclones, tropical storms, and typhoons will form during a season and/or how many tropical cyclones will affect a particular country. These agencies include the Guy Carpenter Asia-Pacific Climate Impact Centre (GCACIC), of the City University of Hong Kong, the Tropical Storm Risk (TSR) Consortium of the University College London, and the Taiwan's Central Weather Bureau.

During January 2011, the Philippine Atmospheric, Geophysical and Astronomical Services Administration (PAGASA) predicted that between twenty and twenty-three tropical cyclones were likely to develop and/or enter the Philippine area of responsibility during 2011. On March 20 the Hong Kong Observatory, predicted that the typhoon season in Hong Kong would be near to above normal with six to nine tropical cyclones passing within 500 km (310 mi) of the territory against an average of around 6. On March 30, the TSR Consortium released their first forecast of the season and predicted that the basin would see a near average season with 27.8 tropical storms, 17.5 typhoons, 7.8 "intense" typhoons and an ACE index of about 275. (Note: According to the TSR, an intense tropical cyclone is a tropical cyclone with maximum 1-minute sustained winds greater than 175 km/h (110 mph).) In early April, the China Meteorological Administration (CMA) predicted that between 24 and 26 tropical storms would develop or move into the basin during the year, which it noted was higher than the previous total of 14. They also predicted that between seven and nine tropical storms would make landfall on China, with the first landing taking place before June 29 and the last landing taking place after October 7. On April 26, the Thai Meteorological Department predicted that two tropical storms would affect Thailand during 2011, with one affecting Upper Thailand during August or September, while one was expected to move through Southern Thailand during October or November.

During May within its first outlook for the year, the GCACIC predicted that the season would be near average with 31 tropical cyclones, 27 tropical storms and 17 typhoons developing during the season. They also predicted that seven tropical cyclones would make landfall on Southern China, between May and December, compared with an average of five while predicting that six tropical cyclones during the whole year compared to an average of four tropical cyclones. TSR revised its initial prediction during May and subsequently predicted that 28.0 tropical storms, 17.7 typhoons, 7.6 "intense" typhoons and an ACE index of about 266. In late June after a near-normal start to the season Taiwan's Central Weather Bureau predicted that the season, would be near average of 25.7 with 22–26 tropical storms occurring over the basin during 2011. Between three and five of the systems were predicted to affect Taiwan, compared to an average of around 3.6. Within its July forecast update, the GCACIC predicted that seven tropical cyclones would make landfall on Southern China, between July and December compared to an average of four and that there would now be 16 typhoons due to the strength of the India-Burma trough. They also predicted that seven tropical cyclones would pass within 100 km (62 mi) of the Korean Peninsula or Japan, during July and December compared to an average of around three. Within its July update, TSR predicted that the ACE index would be about 194, after raising its prediction for the number of tropical storms to 28.0, typhoons to 18.1 and intense typhoons to 8.4. On August 4, TSR subsequently slightly revised these predictions within its final update for 2011 to 28.2 tropical storms, 17.9 typhoons, 8.0 "intense" typhoons and an ACE index of about 281.

== Seasonal summary ==
During April, two tropical depressions developed but they failed to intensify into tropical storms. Tropical Storm Aere (Bebeng) then developed on May 5, and after causing ₱2.25 billion in damage to Northeastern Luzon and Eastern Visayas, the name Bebeng was retired by PAGASA. The second tropical storm of the season then developed on May 19, and affected the Philippines, Taiwan and Japan before becoming extratropical to the east of Japan.

After Tropical Storm Banyan dissipated during October 14, no tropical storms or typhoons were observed within the basin until Tropical Depression 27W developed into Tropical Storm Washi during December 15, due to high vertical windshear and a strong northeast monsoon.

== Systems ==
=== Tropical Depression 01W ===
- Tropical depression (JMA)
- Tropical depression (SSHWS)
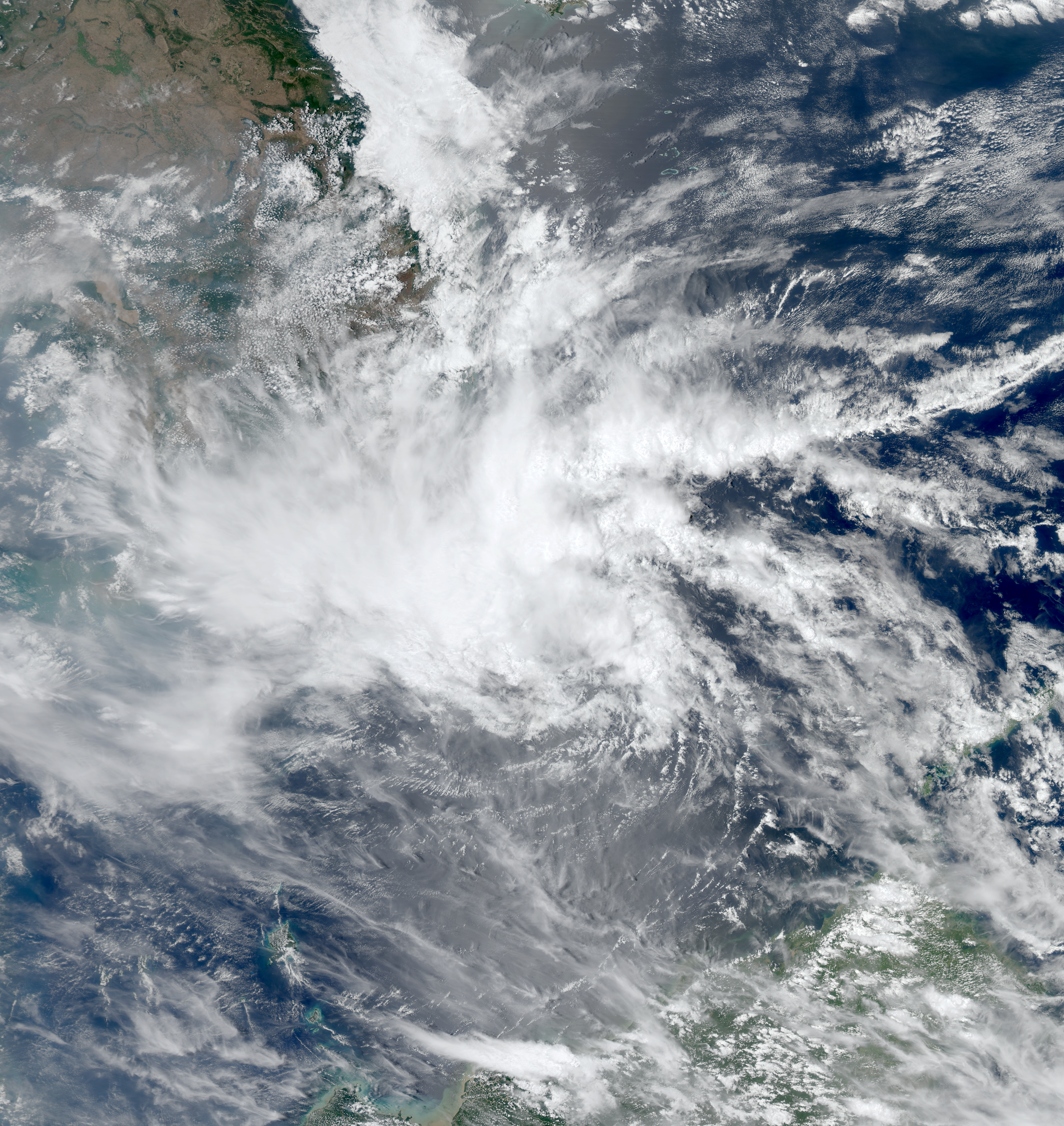
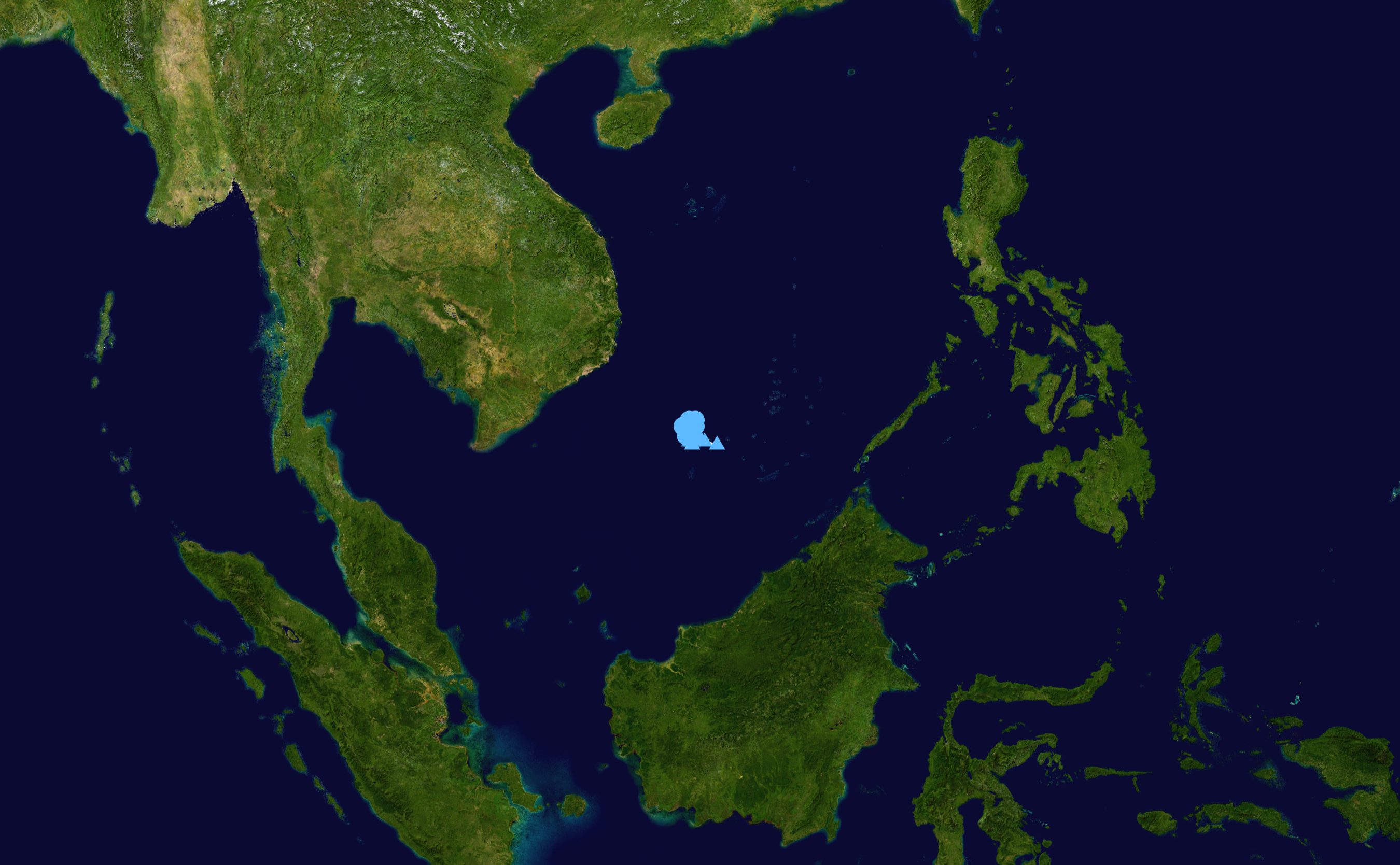
- Duration: April 1 – April 4
- Peak intensity: 55 km/h (35 mph) (10-min); 1004 hPa (mbar)

On April 1, the JMA reported that a tropical depression had developed within an area of moderate vertical wind shear about 510 km (315 mi) to the southeast of Ho Chi Minh City in Southern Vietnam. Over the next day, the system gradually developed further, before the JTWC initiated advisories on the system and designated it as Tropical Depression 01W. However, within hours of this, the depression became devoid of convection as wind shear buffeted the system. This prevented the cyclone from intensifying beyond depression status as it remained nearly stationary. The JMA continued to monitor the system as a tropical depression for another day before issuing their last warning on the system. According to a Vietnam Television's brief reports on the storm during their weather forecast report aired the day after its dissipation, some of its remnants has travelled towards the mainland and combine with other disturbances from the Bay of Bengal, created heavy rainfall which affects parts of the Southeast region of the country, with the Tan Son Nhat airport being delayed up to hours.

=== Tropical Depression 02W (Amang) ===
- Tropical depression (JMA)
- Tropical depression (SSHWS)
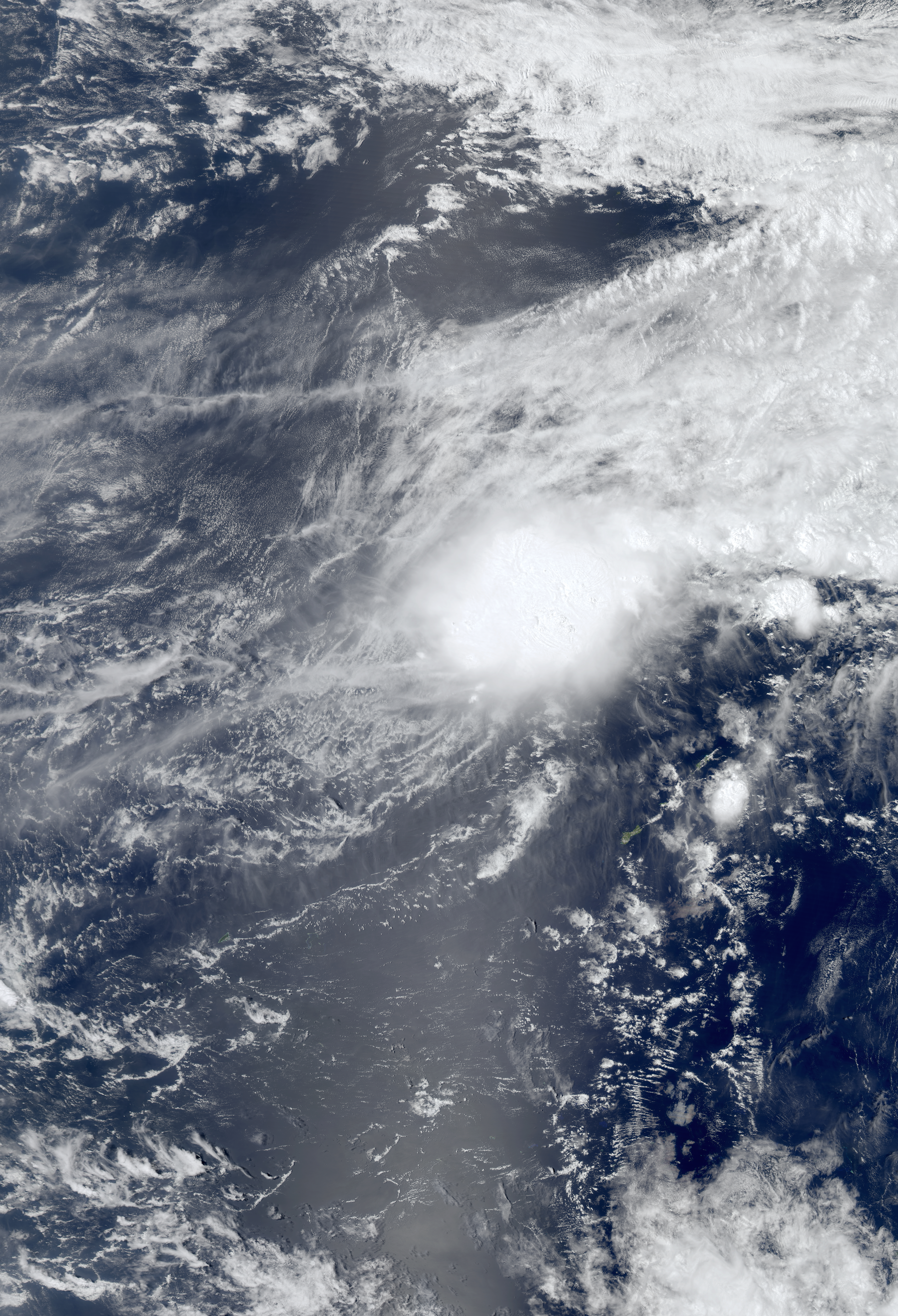
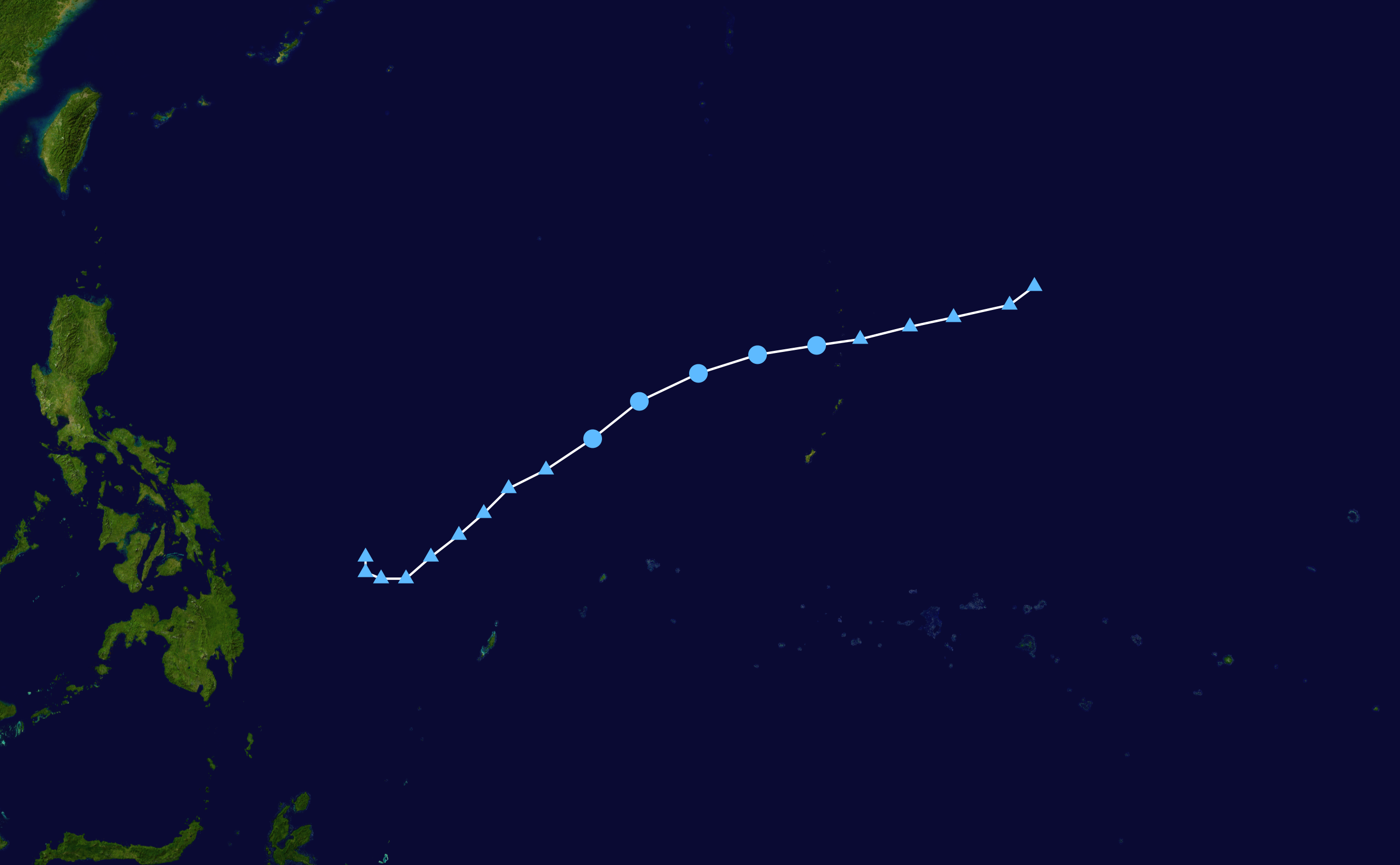
- Duration: April 3 – April 6
- Peak intensity: 55 km/h (35 mph) (10-min); 1000 hPa (mbar)

On March 30, the JMA began monitoring an area of low pressure located southwest of Yap. By April 2, the system developed a low-level circulation, though convection appeared disorganized. Exhibiting good outflow within a region of weak wind shear, the low was anticipated to develop further over the following several days as it drifted west-northwestward. After briefly stalling early on April 3, the storm turned towards the east. Additionally, the JMA considered the system sufficiently organized to be declared a tropical depression. As the system was located to the west of 135°E, PAGASA began issuing advisories on the depression as well, assigning it the name "Amang". Tracking northeastward, the depression eventually developed enough convection to be declared Tropical Depression 02W by the JTWC on April 4. However, this was expected to be brief as a decaying frontal boundary approached from the west and prompted the system to undergo an extratropical transition. This intensification prompted the National Weather Service (NWS) in Tiyan, Guam to issue a tropical storm warning for the islands of Agrihan, Pagan and Alamagan. Interacting with the front and high wind shear, the system became partially exposed and elongated as it moved over cooler waters. Early on April 6, the JTWC issued their final advisory on the depression as it began to dissipate over open waters.

=== Tropical Storm Aere (Bebeng) ===
- Tropical storm (JMA)
- Tropical storm (SSHWS)
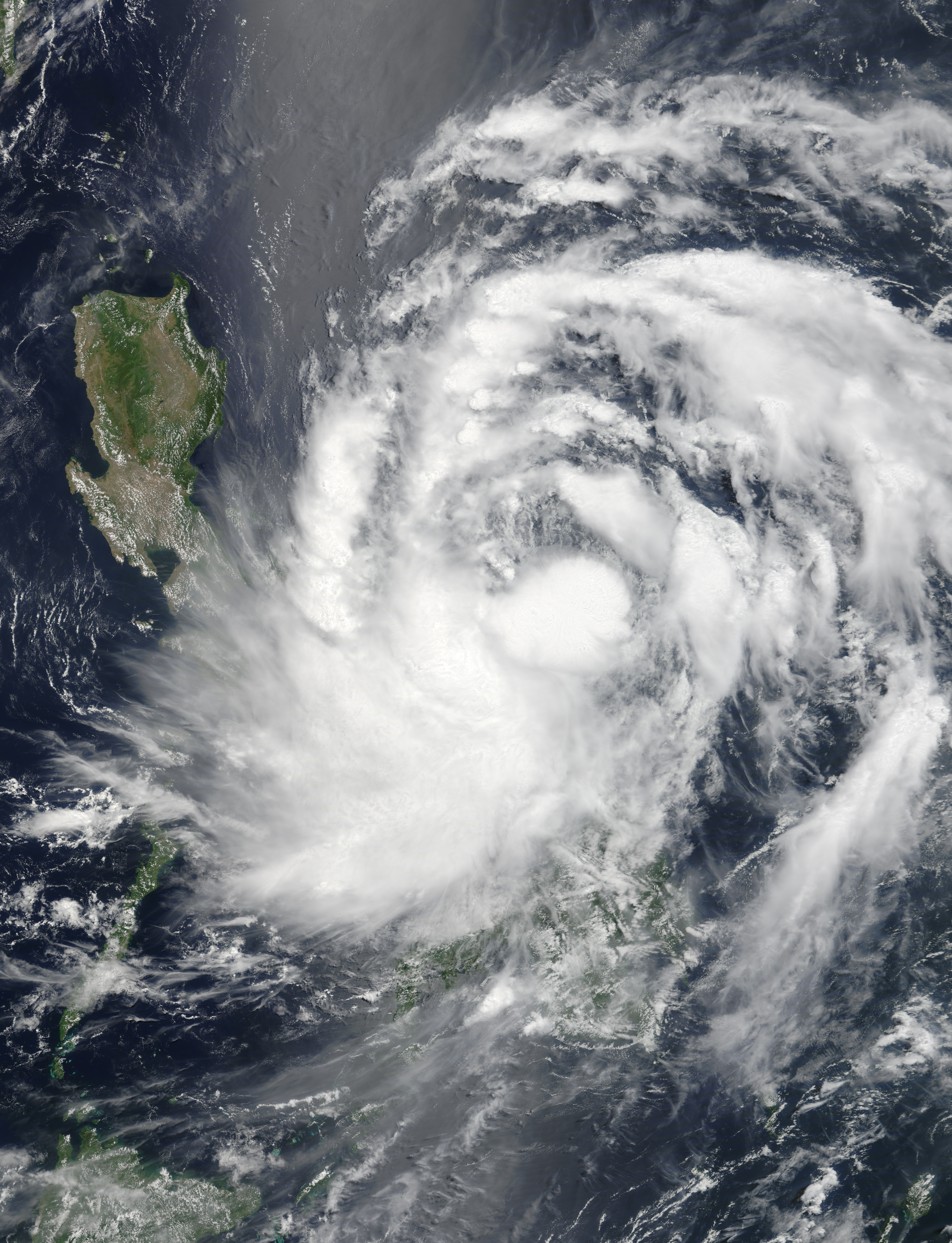
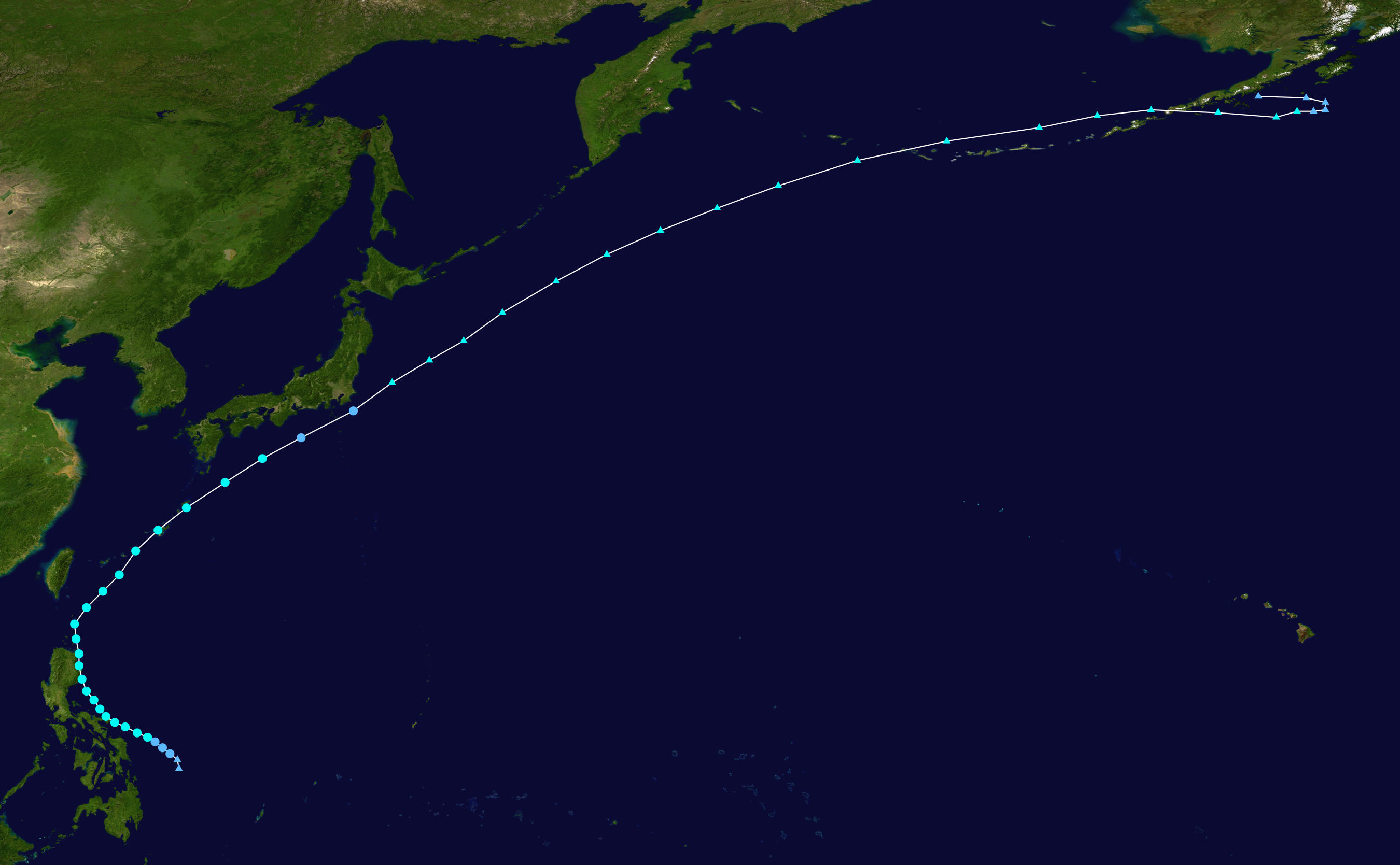
- Duration: May 6 – May 12
- Peak intensity: 75 km/h (45 mph) (10-min); 992 hPa (mbar)

On May 3, the JTWC started to monitor a tropical disturbance that had developed within a monsoon trough about 140 km (87 mi) to the west of Palau. At this time the disturbances low level circulation center was weak and unorganized, while a minimal amount of deep convection was observed around the system. Over the next couple of days the depression gradually developed further in an area of low vertical wind shear before it was declared a tropical depression by the JMA and the JTWC during May 6. In the same evening, PAGASA upgraded the low pressure into a tropical depression and assigned its local name 'Bebeng'. On the afternoon of May 7, JMA upgraded the depression to a tropical storm and assigned the name 'Aere'. During the early morning of May 12, the JMA downgraded Aere to a tropical depression while south of Kyushu Island as it became a weak extratropical cyclone. Its extratropical remnants finally dissipated on May 15.

Throughout the Philippines, multiple agencies activated their emergency plans as the storm approached. The Armed Forces of the Philippines, the Philippine National Police, and the Philippine Coast Guard were all placed on standby to deploy to areas struck by Aere once the storm passed. Several ports were affected by the storm, stranding 1,379 passengers by the afternoon of May 7. According to the National Disaster Risk Reduction and Management Council, at least 35 people have been killed and two more are missing as a result of Aere. Agricultural losses are estimated at ₱1.37 billion ($31.7 million). Widespread flooding and landslides damaged homes, blocked off roads and severed communications. In Catarman, Northern Samar, 377.4 mm (14.86 in) of rain fell in just 24 hours, resulted in significant flash flooding.

=== Typhoon Songda (Chedeng) ===
- Violent typhoon (JMA)
- Category 5 super typhoon (SSHWS)
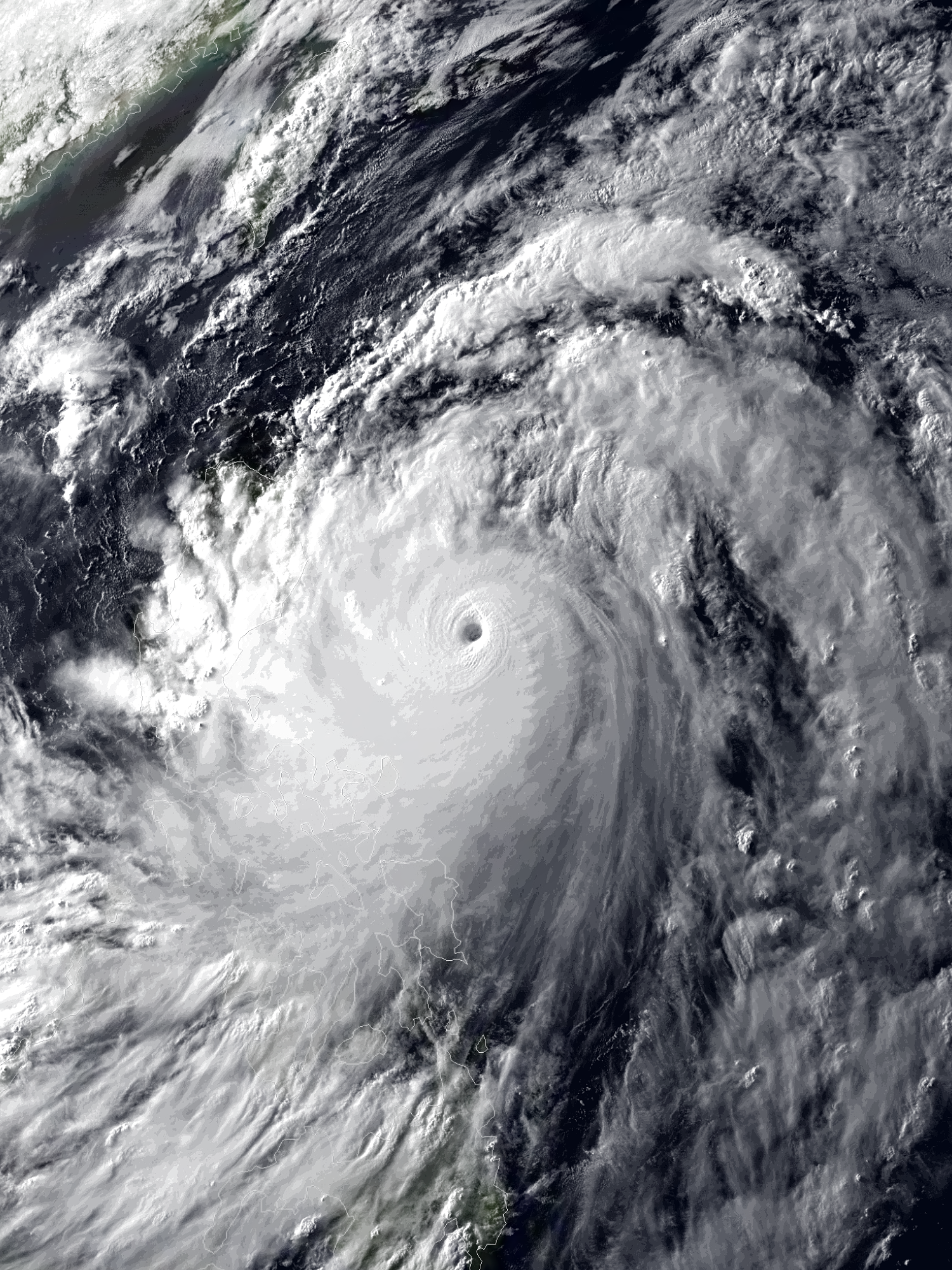
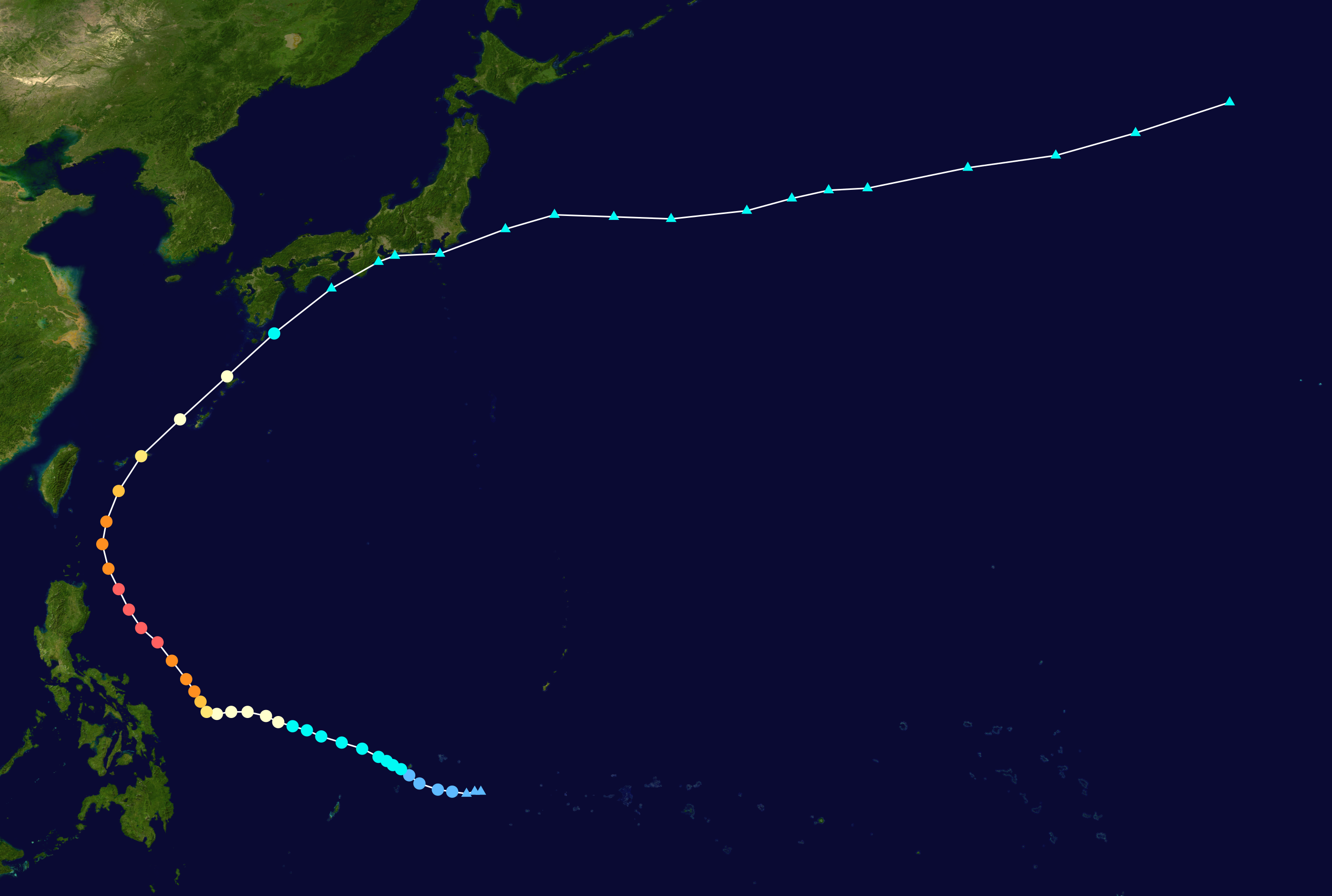
- Duration: May 19 – May 29
- Peak intensity: 195 km/h (120 mph) (10-min); 920 hPa (mbar)

A weak non-tropical system formed within the Intertropical Convergence Zone on May 17, as it moved in a westward direction. On May 19, the JTWC reported that an area of low pressure had persisted about 510 km (320 mi) to the southeast of Yap. As the system moved towards the northwest under the influence of a subtropical ridge of high pressure, it rapidly consolidated in an area of light to moderate vertical wind shear. The JMA then started to monitor the system as a tropical depression later that day, before the JTWC designated it as Tropical Depression 04W early on May 20. The JTWC then reported later that day that the depression had intensified into a tropical storm with wind speeds of 65 km/h (40 mph), however, it later reported that it had overestimated the wind speeds and consequently lowered the storm's status to a tropical depression, based on observations from Yap island. Late on May 21, both the JMA and the JTWC reported that the depression had now become a tropical storm with the JMA naming it as Songda. Over the next couple of days, the system gradually intensified further while moving northwest into PAGASA's area of responsibility. PAGASA named it as Chedeng. At 12:00 UTC on May 24, the JTWC reported that Songda had intensified into a typhoon. 12 hours later, the JMA followed suit while the system was located about 800 km (500 mi) to the southeast of Manila in the Philippines. It rapidly intensified into a Category 5 typhoon. On the afternoon of May 29, Songda became extratropical south of Shikoku Island. The extratropical remnants of Sonda later crossed the International Date Line, which was later absorbed by another extratropical cyclone on June 4, and later dissipated completely over Alaska.

Although Songda remained offshore, heavy rains within the typhoon's outer bands impacted the Philippines, causing significant flash flooding and landslides. Four fatalities are attributed to the system there. Further north, Okinawa experienced intense wind gusts, measured up to 198 km/h (123 mph), along with torrential rain. Extensive damage took place across the area with losses reaching ¥23.2 billion ($287 million); however, there were no fatalities. As it became extratropical, Songda brought heavy rains from Kyushu to eastern Honshu, causing significant flooding. At least 13 people were killed in the country and an estimated 400,000 had to be evacuated around Tokyo alone.

=== Tropical Storm Sarika (Dodong) ===
- Tropical storm (JMA)
- Tropical depression (SSHWS)
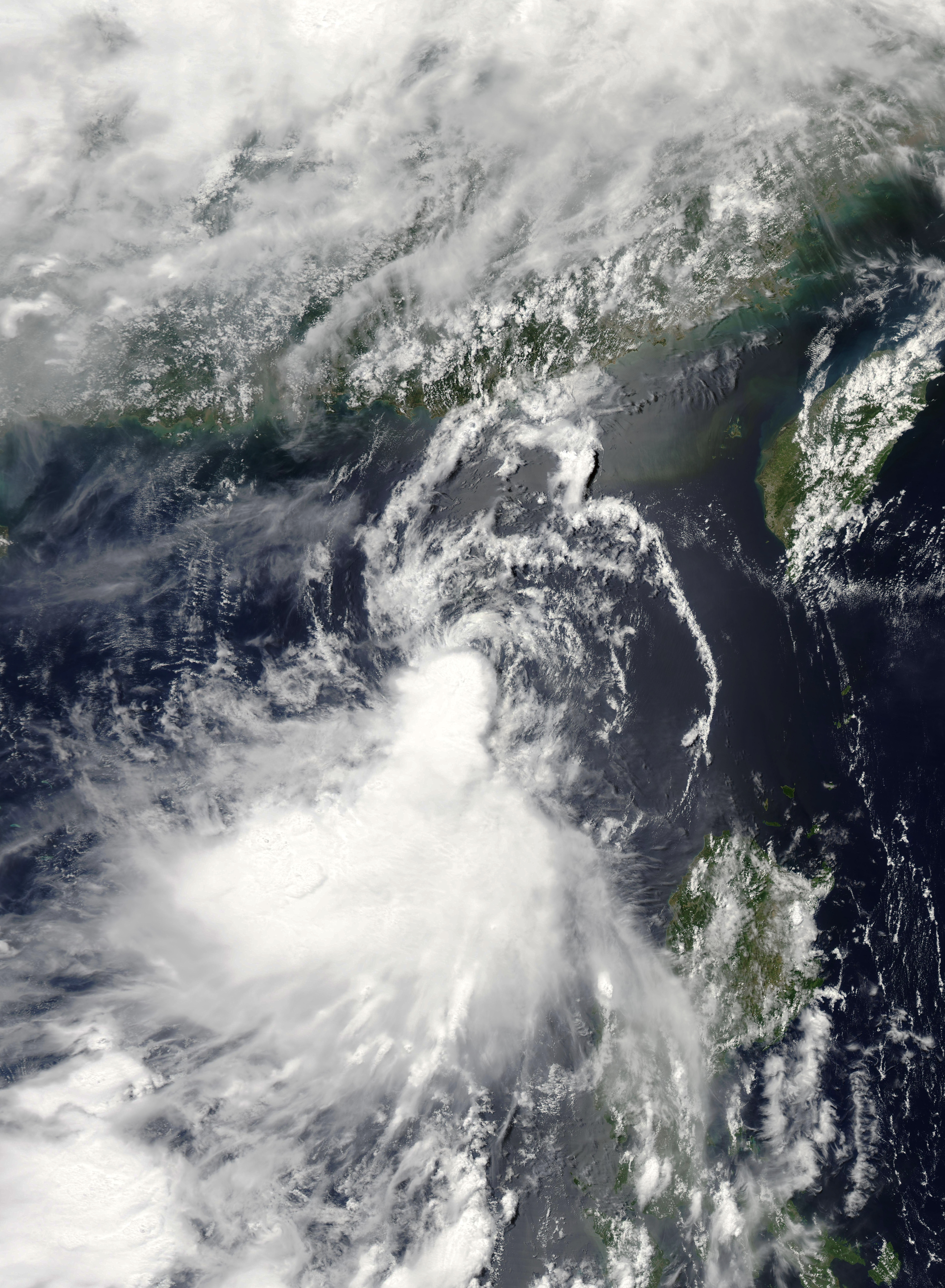
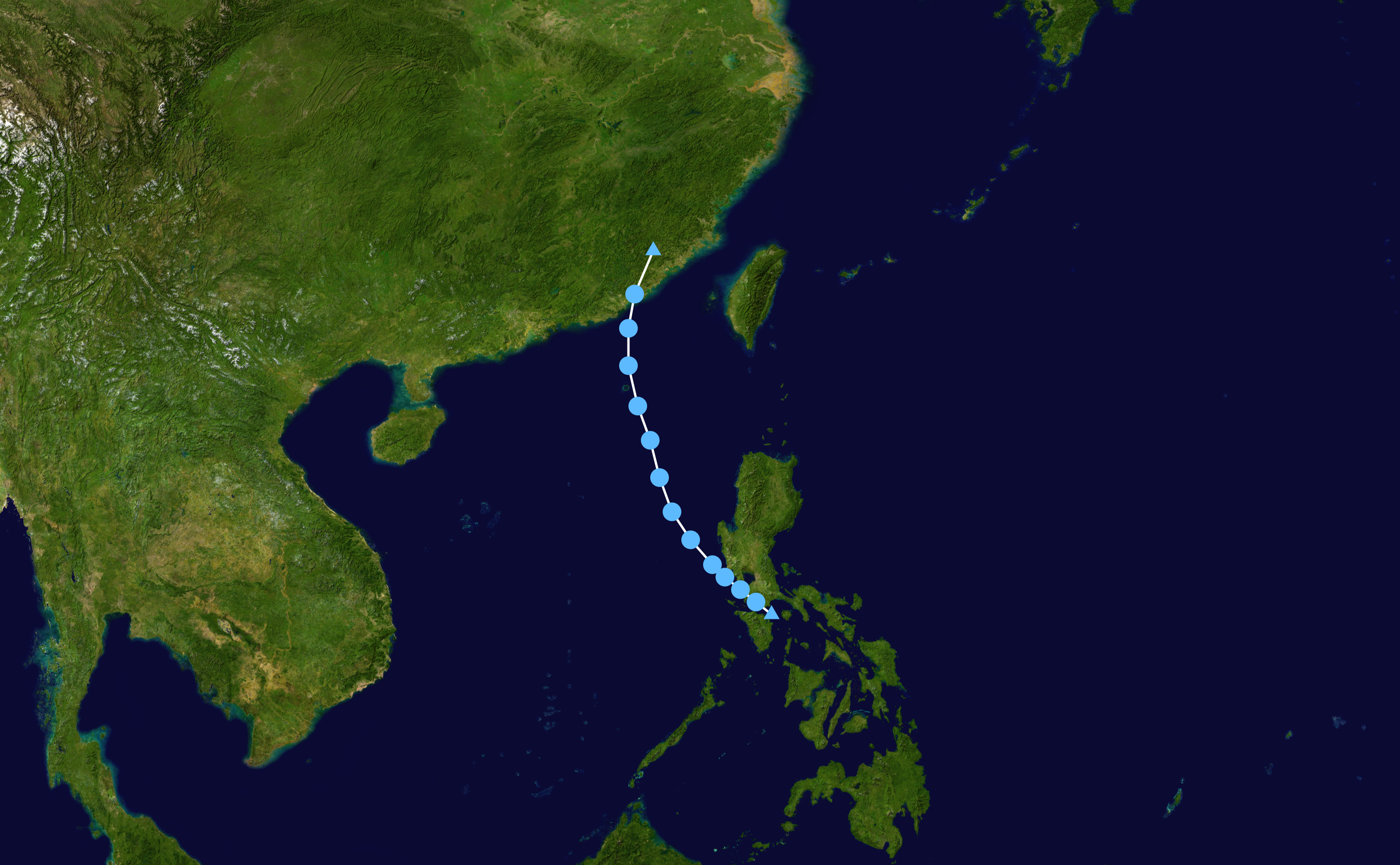
- Duration: June 8 – June 11
- Peak intensity: 75 km/h (45 mph) (10-min); 996 hPa (mbar)

On early June 8, an area of low pressure formed about 10 km (6.2 mi) west of Cebu City, Philippines. As it moved towards the Mindoro Strait the JMA and JTWC began to monitor the system. In the early morning hours of June 9, the Philippines' PAGASA upgraded the system to a tropical depression and reported the storm center to be about 450 km (280 mi) west of Dagupan in the Philippines. The next day, the JMA and JTWC upgraded the tropical depression into a tropical storm, with the JMA naming it Sarika. During the morning of June 11, the JTWC downgraded Sarika to a tropical depression after making landfall in Shantou, China. The JTWC soon issued their final advisory on Sarika. Sarika made landfall on mainland China with winds of 75 km/h (45 mph).

As a result of the storm, 23 people were killed in Xianning, and ten more were declared missing. Damages from Sarika are estimated at $248 million.

=== Tropical Storm Haima (Egay) ===
- Tropical storm (JMA)
- Tropical storm (SSHWS)
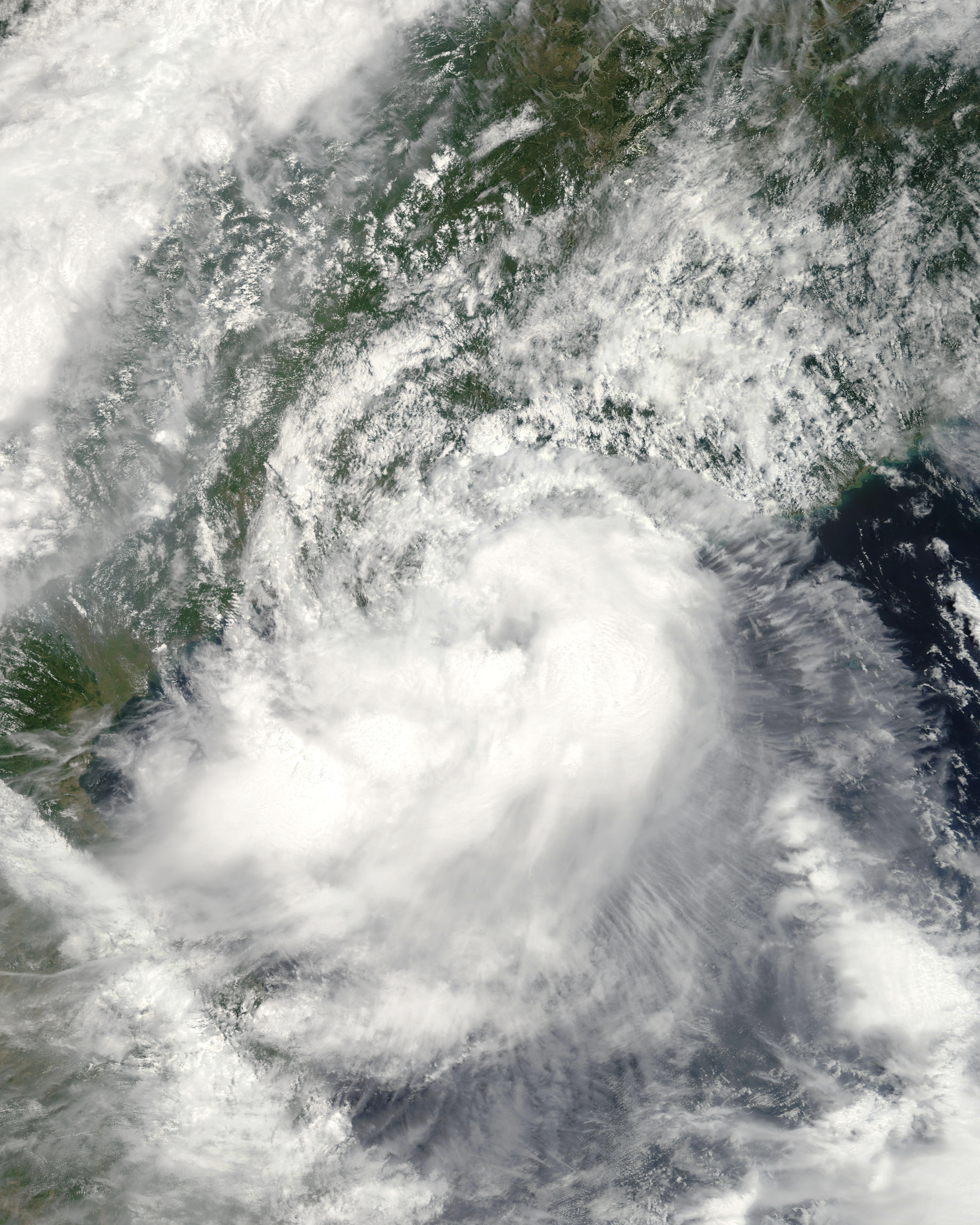
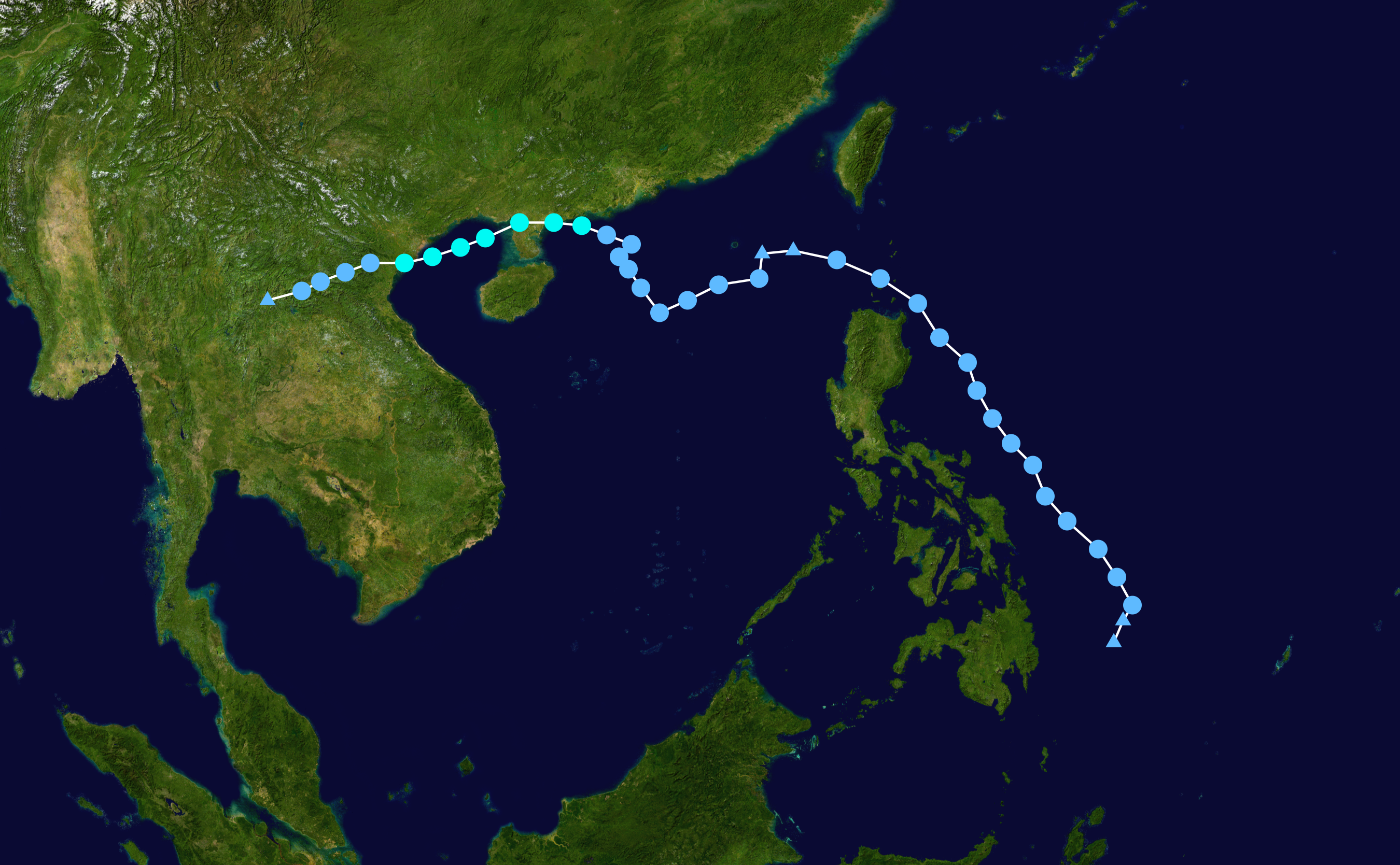
- Duration: June 16 – June 25
- Peak intensity: 75 km/h (45 mph) (10-min); 985 hPa (mbar)

Two tropical disturbances formed in an area of convection and moderate vertical wind shear east of Mindanao, Philippines on June 13. Both of them started to interact with each other and the other one absorbed the moisture of the other disturbance. On June 15, the JTWC started to monitor an area of disturbed weather within that disturbance that was located about 1,350 km (840 mi), to the southeast of Manila, Philippines. Over the next couple of days the system gradually developed further, before late on June 16, the JMA, JTWC and PAGASA, all reported that the system had developed into a tropical depression, with PAGASA naming it as Egay. Egay continued to develop during June 17, as it moved towards the northeast, and on June 18, the JTWC reported that Egay had intensified into a tropical storm. Fluctuations in intensity occurred over the next several days, before the JMA reported that the system had strengthened into a tropical storm on June 22, naming it Haima. The JTWC also followed suit, by upgrading it to a tropical storm again.

During the evening of June 23, the JTWC downgraded Haima to a tropical depression after making landfall in Zhanjiang, Guangdong, China but upgraded it to a tropical storm again on June 24,. Early on June 25, Haima became a tropical depression after moving inland in Vietnam. As it made landfall over Hanoi, Vietnam, the JTWC and the Hong Kong Observatory downgraded Haima to a low-pressure area.

During the period when the storm affected Vietnam, the highest wind gust recorded on land was 83 km/h (51 mph), observed in Thái Bình. Heavy rainfall of 100 mm or more was recorded in many areas across the Northern and North Central regions. The lowest atmospheric pressure during the storm was 986.4 hPa (29.13 inHg), recorded at a weather station in Văn Lý (Nam Định). Haima has killed 28 people and left 4 others missing in Vietnam.

=== Severe Tropical Storm Meari (Falcon) ===
- Severe tropical storm (JMA)
- Tropical storm (SSHWS)
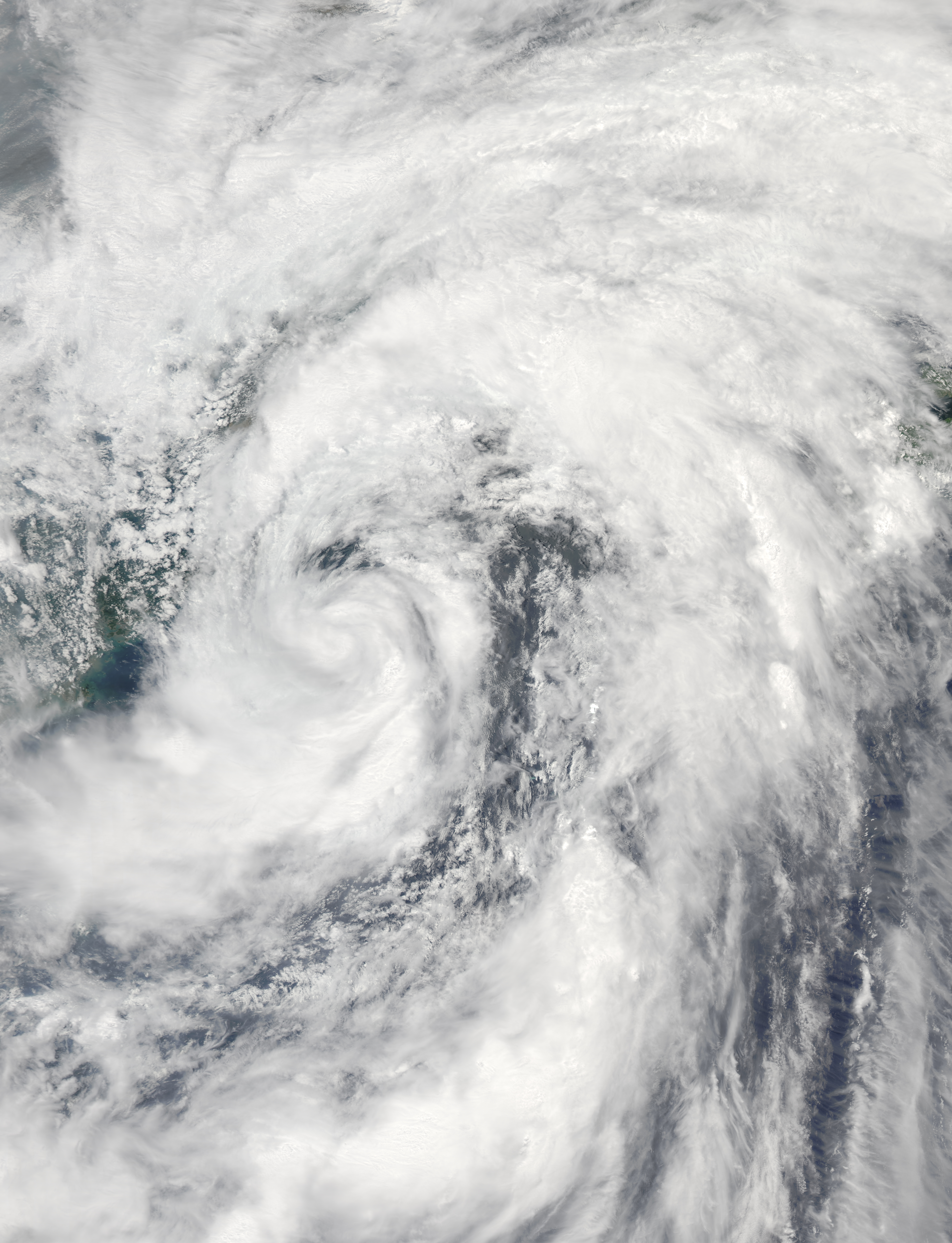
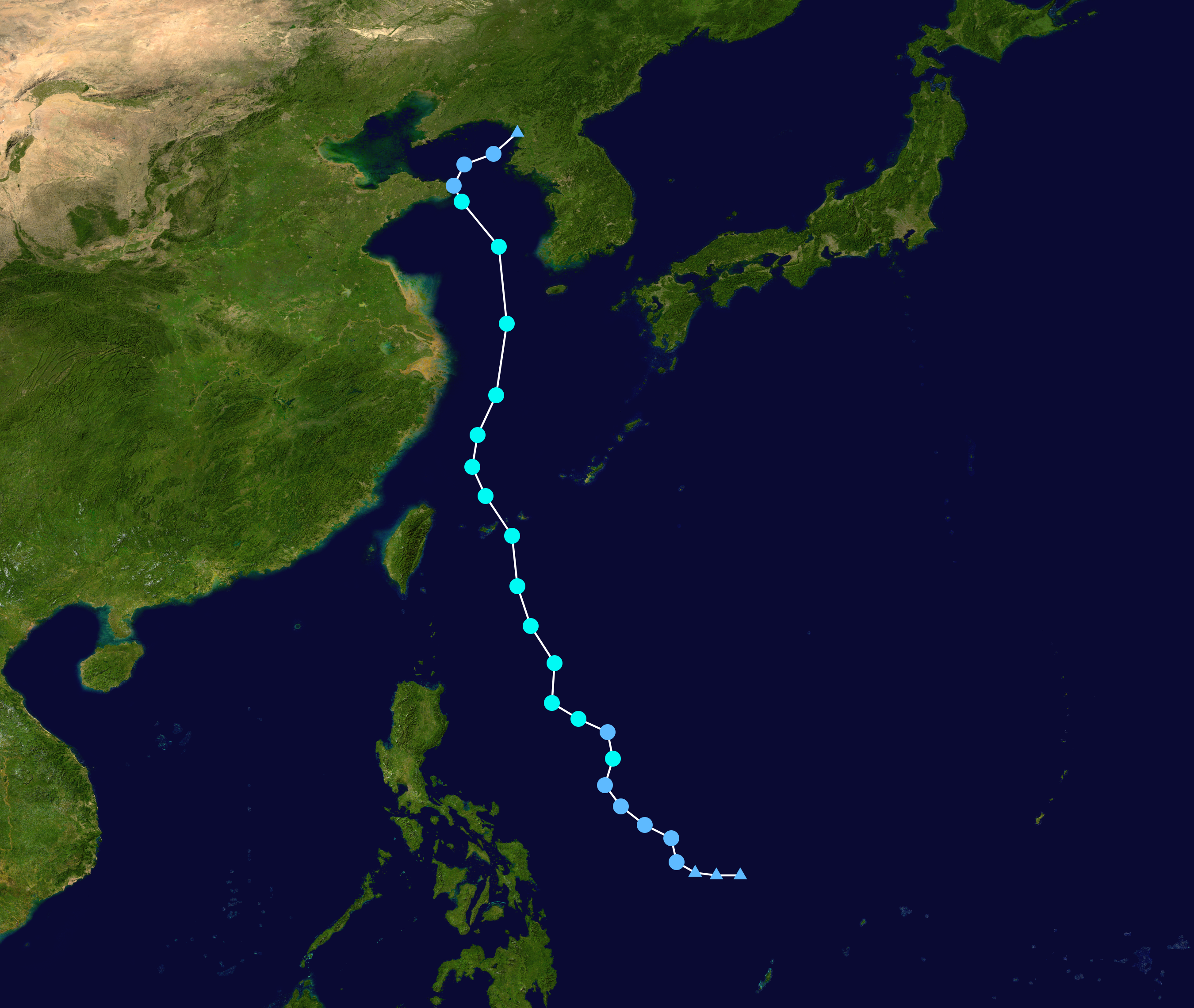
- Duration: June 20 – June 27
- Peak intensity: 110 km/h (70 mph) (10-min); 975 hPa (mbar)

Early on June 20, an area of low pressure about 760 km (470 mi), east of the Philippines began to be monitored by both the JTWC and JMA. That evening, the JTWC issued a Tropical Cyclone Formation Alert. Soon afterwards, PAGASA upgraded the system into a tropical depression, naming it as "Falcon". At the time of the upgrade, Falcon was located about 1,000 km (620 mi), east northeast of Cebu City. During the evening of June 21, the JTWC also reported that Falcon had strengthened into a tropical depression. On June 22, both the JTWC and the JMA upgraded Falcon into a tropical storm, and the JMA named it Meari. Meari left the Philippines with 2 deaths and 5 people missing. On the afternoon on June 24, the JMA upgraded Meari to a severe tropical storm as it passed Okinawa, Japan.

On June 26, Meari rapidly moved to the Yellow Sea but slowly passed Weihai, Shandong, China, and then the JMA downgraded Meari to a tropical storm on the same day. On June 27, the JTWC downgraded Meari to a tropical depression before it made landfall on North Korea, and the JMA reported that Meari became a low-pressure area later.

Heavy rains from the storm's outer bands triggered significant flooding and landslides in South Korea. At least nine people were killed and three others were reported missing across the country. In North Korea, heavy rains from the storm caused widespread flooding and damage. At least 160 homes were destroyed and 50,000 hectares of crops submerged. Several reports of confirmed fatalities arose but no details on how many were given to news agencies.

=== Tropical Depression Goring ===
- Tropical depression (JMA)
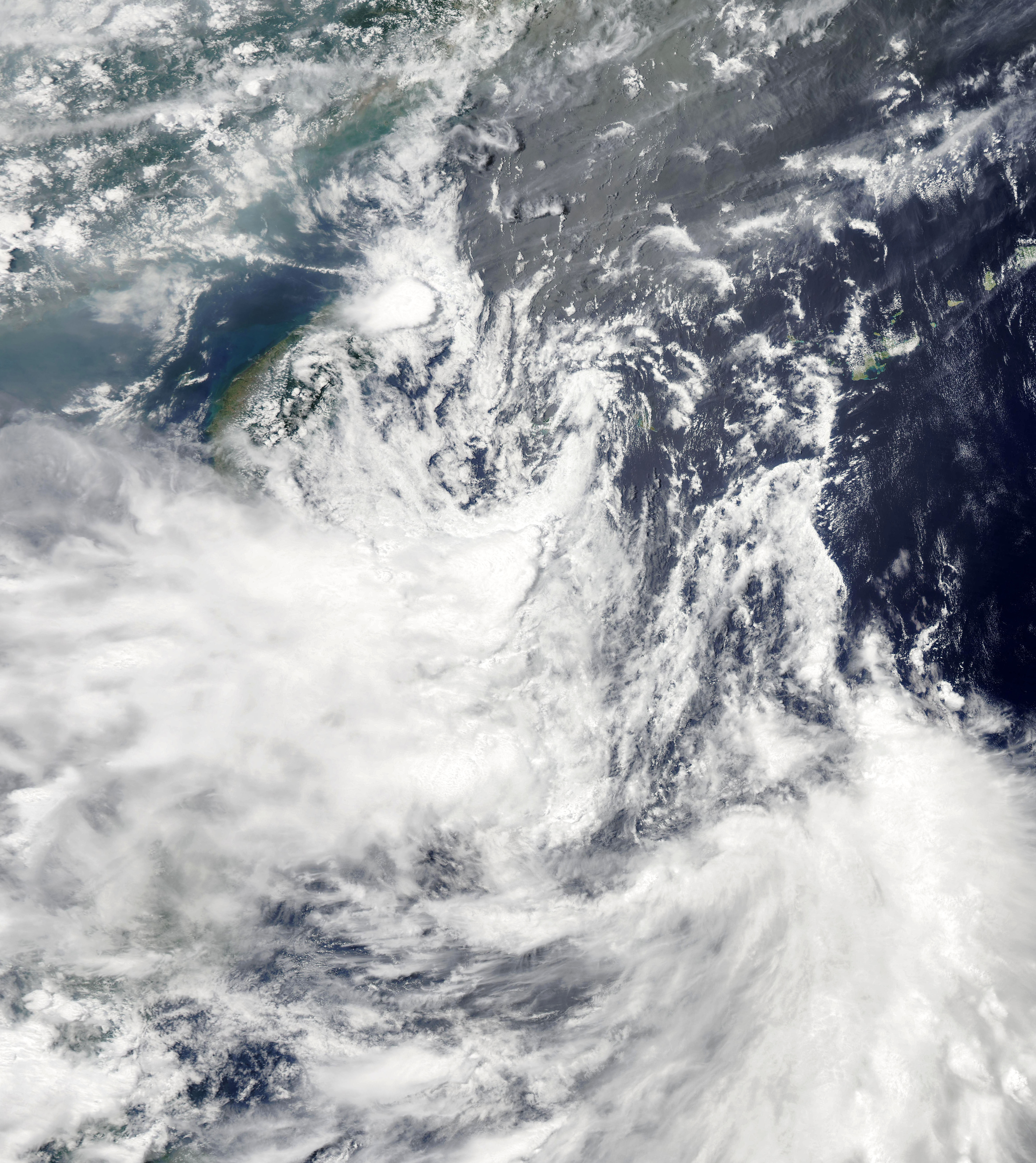
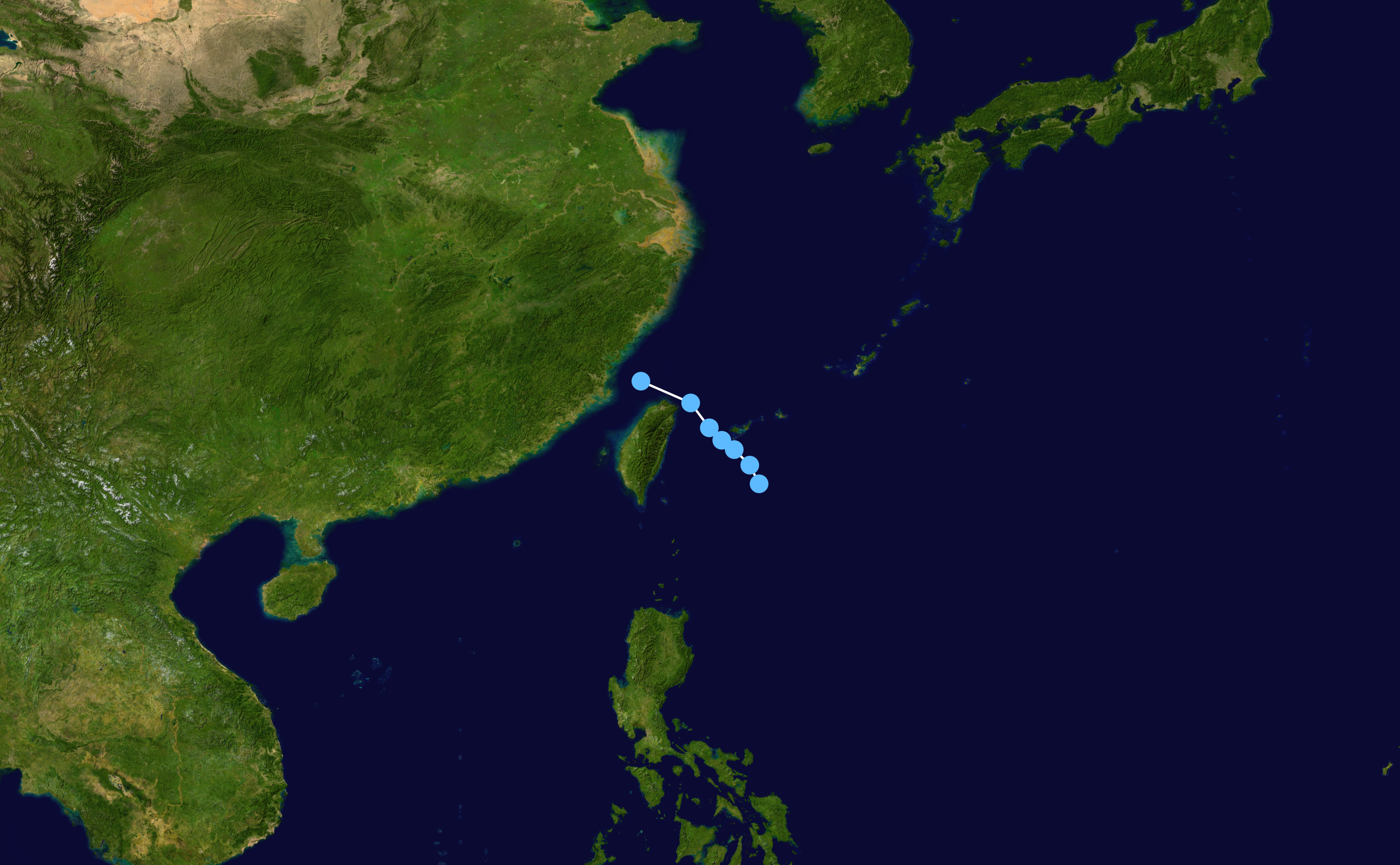
- Duration: July 8 – July 10
- Peak intensity: 45 km/h (30 mph) (10-min); 998 hPa (mbar)

Late on July 8, an area of low pressure formed about 300 km (190 mi) east of Aurora. The center was 460 km (290 mi) north of Basco, Batanes. On the morning of July 9, JMA upgraded the system to a tropical depression. It was located 450 km (280 mi) northeast of Cagayan. In the afternoon, PAGASA upgraded the low-pressure area into a tropical depression and named it Goring. After making landfall on Fujian, China, it dissipated on the evening on July 10. However, the JMA classified the system as a tropical depression until the evening of July 10.

=== Typhoon Ma-on (Ineng) ===
- Very strong typhoon (JMA)
- Category 4 typhoon (SSHWS)
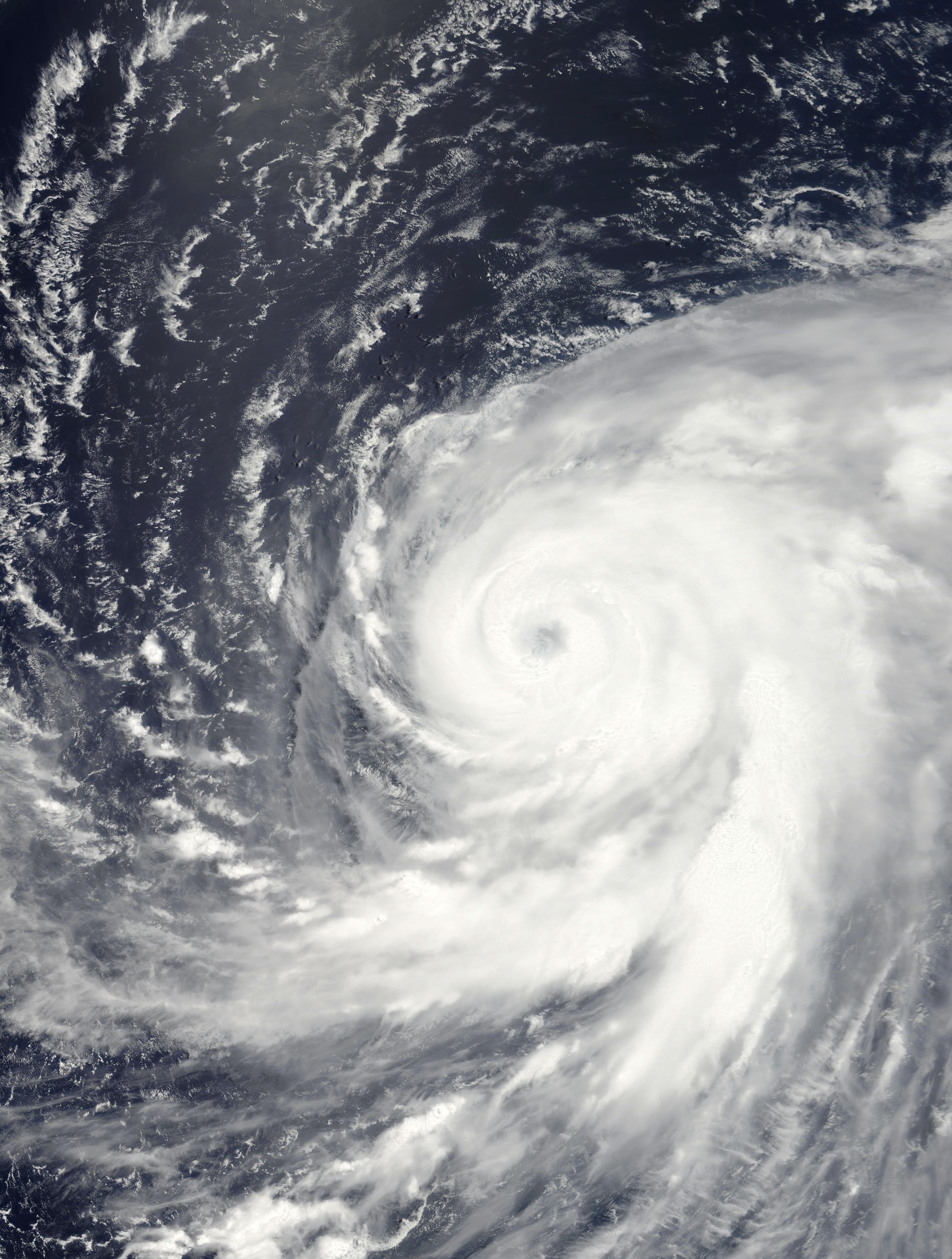
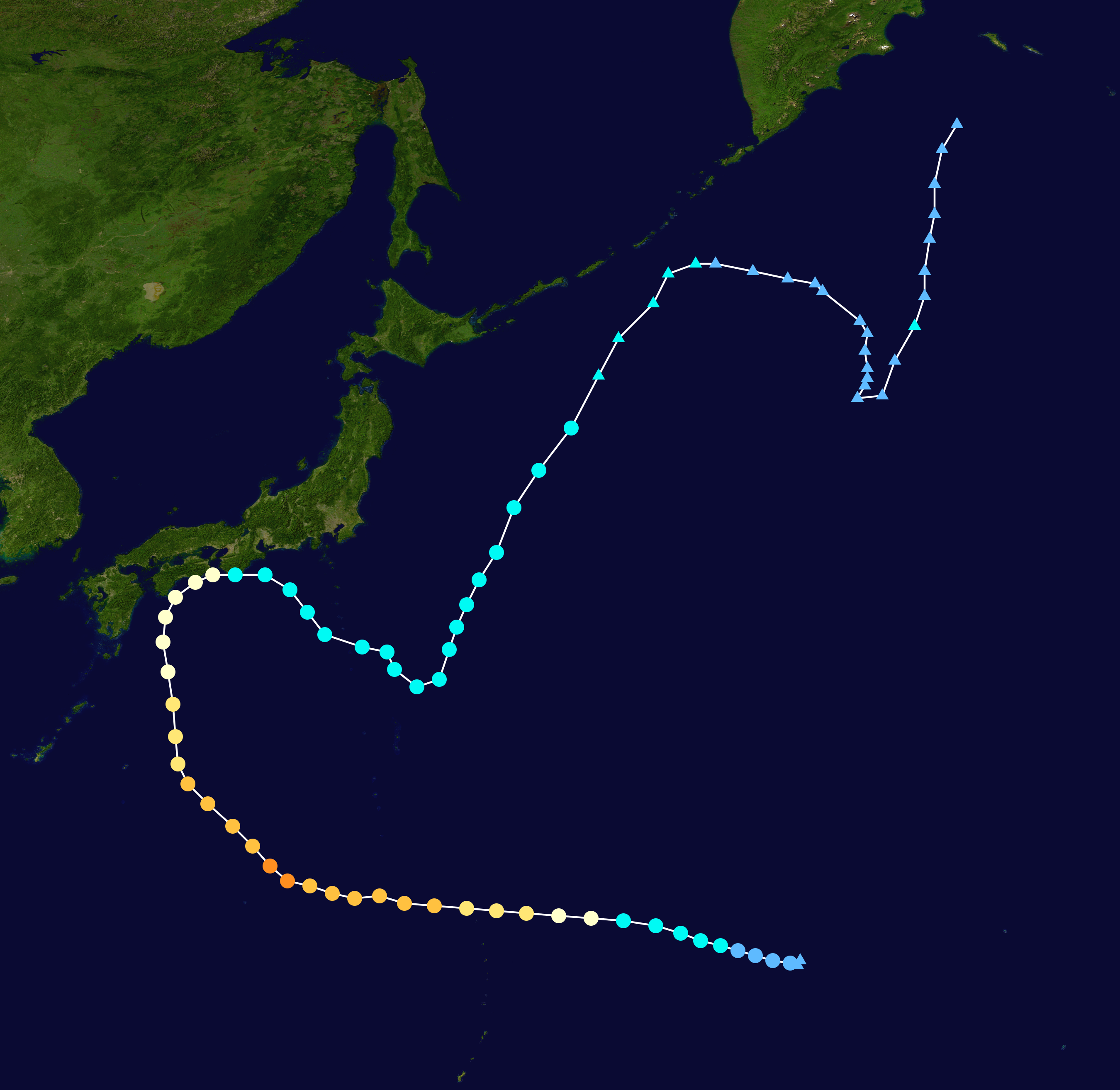
- Duration: July 11 – July 24
- Peak intensity: 175 km/h (110 mph) (10-min); 935 hPa (mbar)

An area of convection spawned a small area of low pressure on the morning of July 9. It became a tropical disturbance as it passed over the warm waters of the Pacific Ocean. On July 11, both the JMA and JTWC upgraded the tropical disturbance to a tropical depression which was located near Minamitorishima. On July 12, both the JMA and JTWC upgraded the system to a tropical storm and named it Ma-on. Early on July 13, the JMA upgraded Ma-on to a severe tropical storm and later that day strengthened into a typhoon. After absorbing Tokage, Ma-on reached its peak intensity on July 16. The PAGASA named it Ineng on July 17.

While Ma-on was affecting Japan, the JTWC downgraded it to a tropical storm in the evening on July 19, before making landfall on Tokushima later in the day. The JMA downgraded Ma-on to a severe tropical storm after it made landfall in Wakayama early on July 20. The JTWC downgraded Ma-on to a tropical depression on July 21, and discontinued advisories the following day. The JMA downgraded Ma-on to a tropical storm early on July 23 and transitioned into an extratropical cyclone east of the Tōhoku region the next day.

=== Tropical Storm Tokage (Hanna) ===
- Tropical storm (JMA)
- Tropical depression (SSHWS)
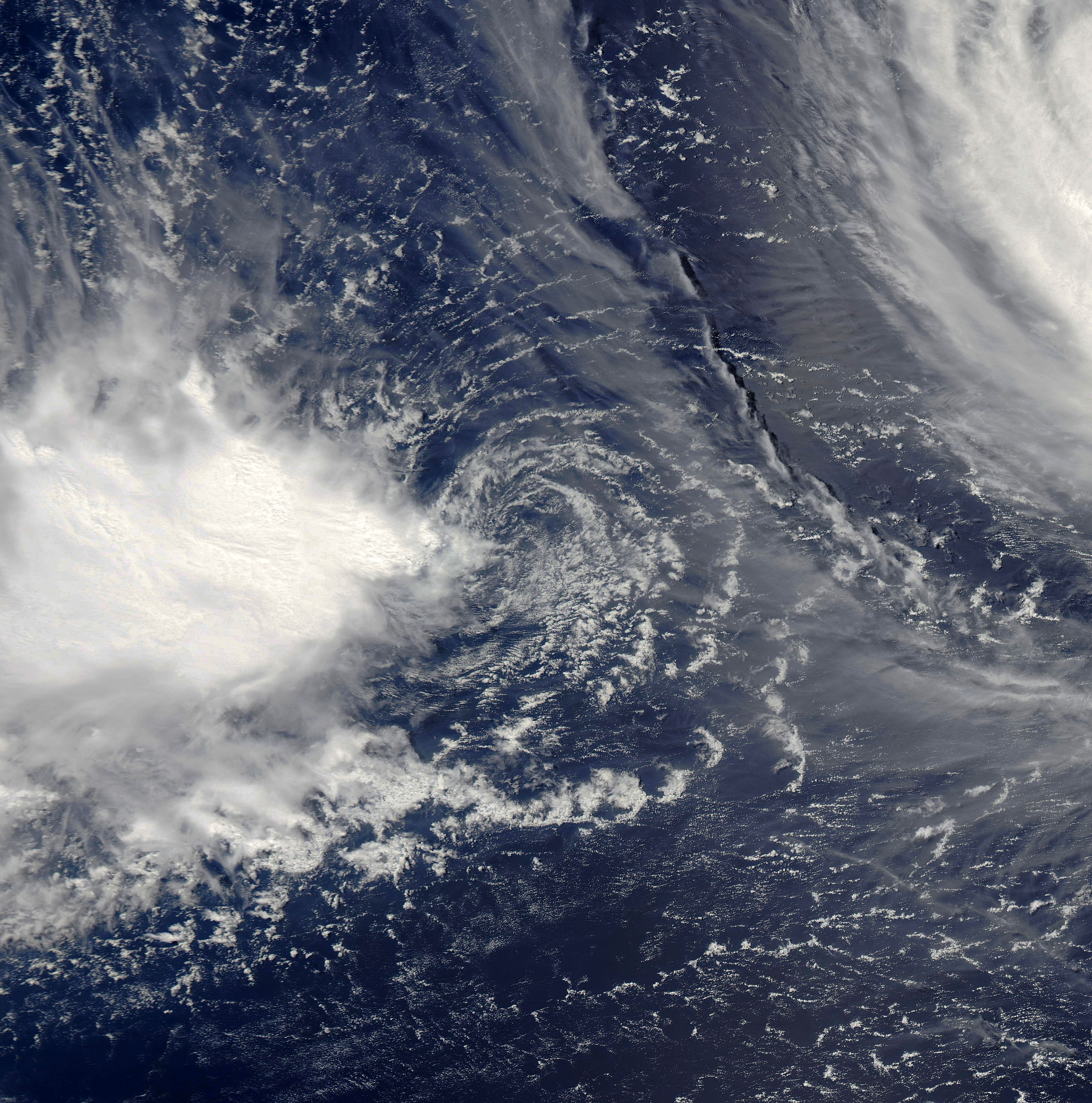
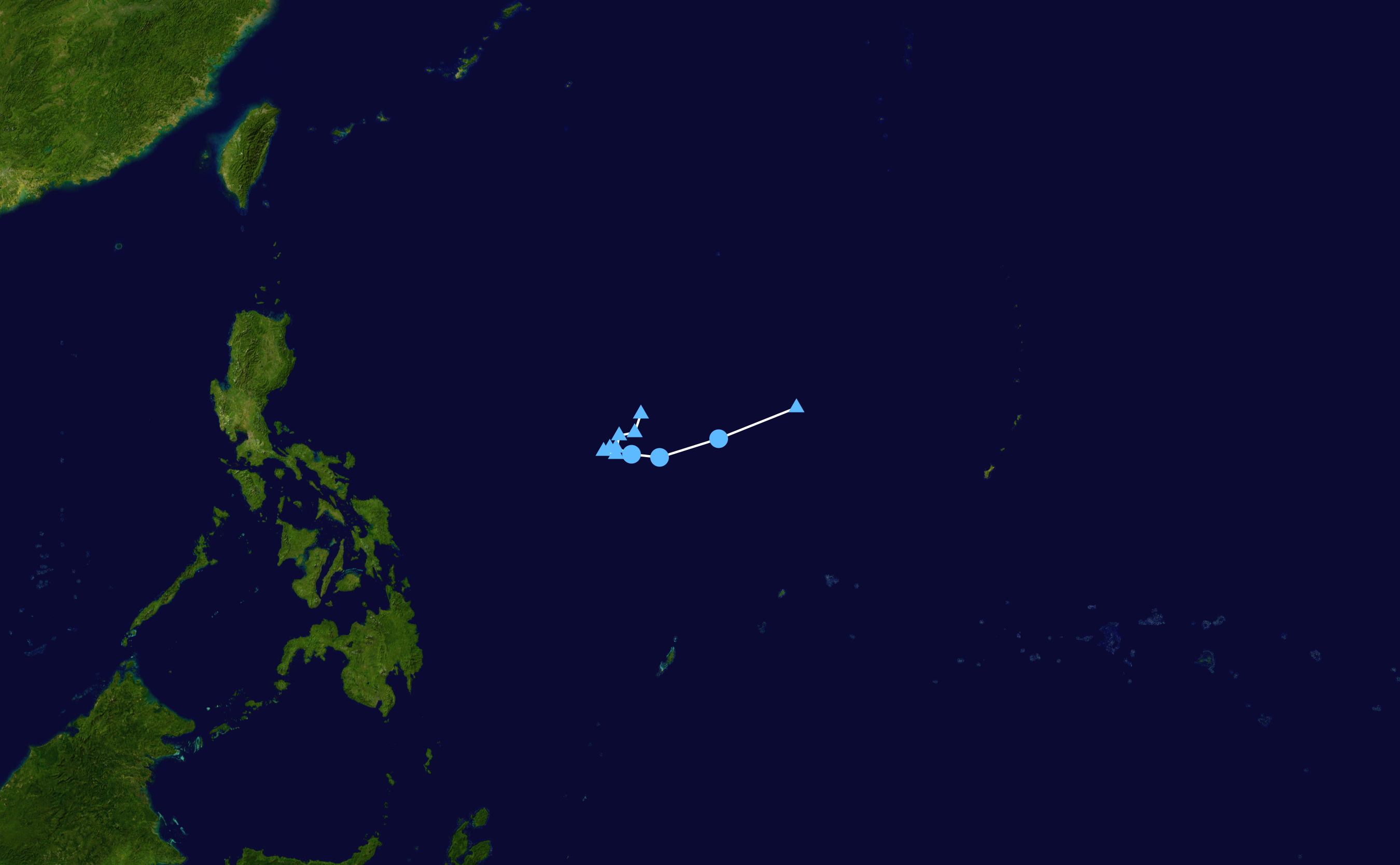
- Duration: July 13 – July 15
- Peak intensity: 65 km/h (40 mph) (10-min); 1000 hPa (mbar)

On July 11, the JTWC started to monitor a tropical disturbance that had developed within a poorly organized monsoon trough about 1,000 kilometers (620 mi) to the northwest of Hagatna, Guam. Over the next couple of days, the disturbance moved towards the west and despite the system being in an area of low vertical wind shear, deep convection surrounding the system struggled to organize around the disturbances low level circulation center. However, by 06:00 UTC on July 13, it had organized enough for the JMA to declare the disturbance a tropical depression. Over the next two days, the system continued to move towards the west and gradually consolidated further. The JMA then named the system as Tokage, as it had developed into a tropical storm and reached its 10-minute peak wind speeds of 65 km/h (40 mph). PAGASA then initiated advisories on the system and named it Hanna, before the JTWC designated the system as Tropical Depression 09W and initiated advisories on the system, while it was at its 1-minute peak wind speeds of 55 km/h (35 mph). However, by this time Tokage was already interacting with Typhoon Ma-on, with Ma-on's outflow exposing Tokage's low level circulation center, and displacing convection to the west. The JMA, PAGASA and the JTWC then issued their final advisories on the system later that day as the remnants of Tokage was absorbed into Ma-on, due to the Fujiwhara effect late on July 15.

=== Severe Tropical Storm Nock-ten (Juaning) ===
- Severe tropical storm (JMA)
- Category 1 typhoon (SSHWS)
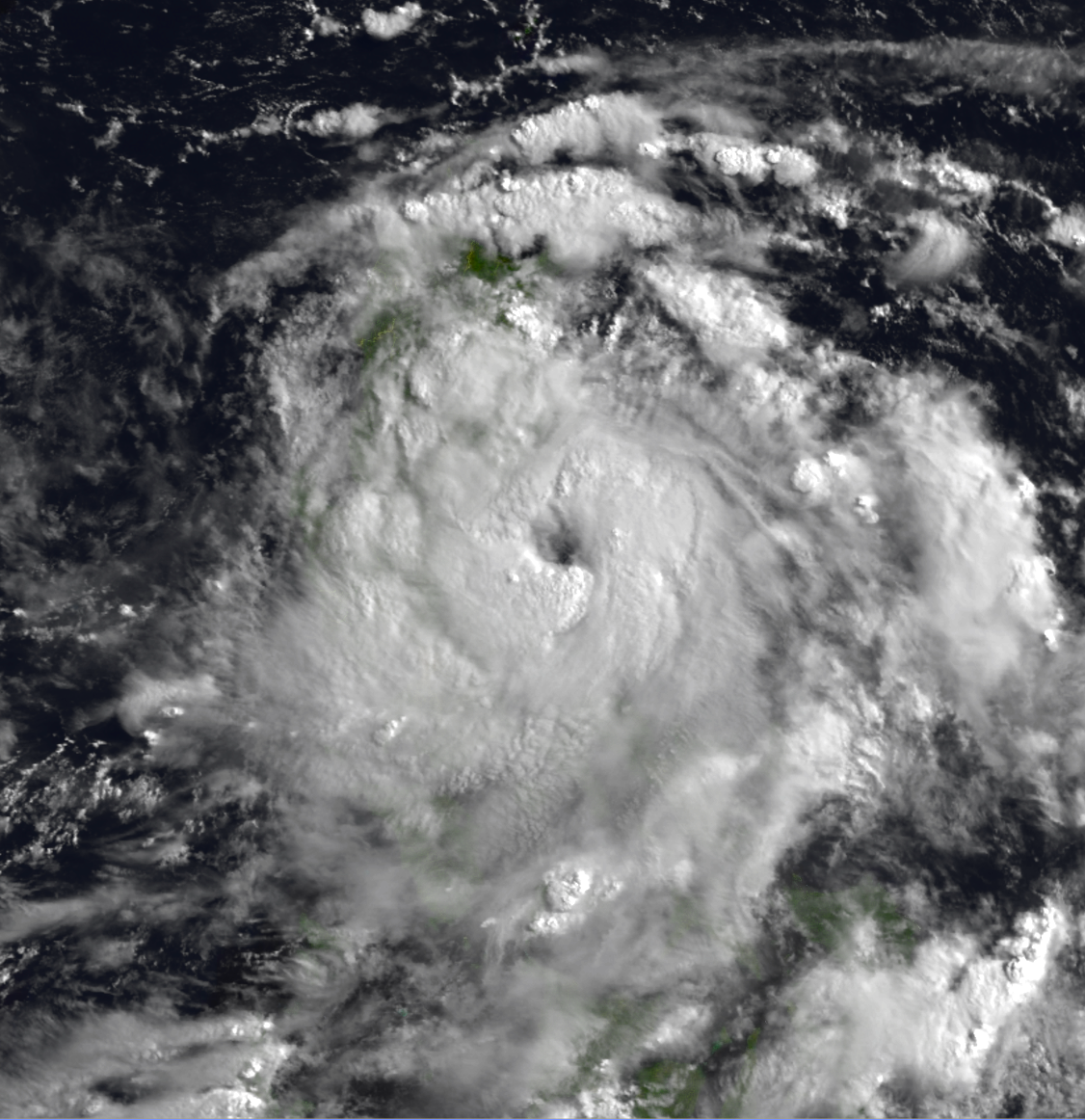
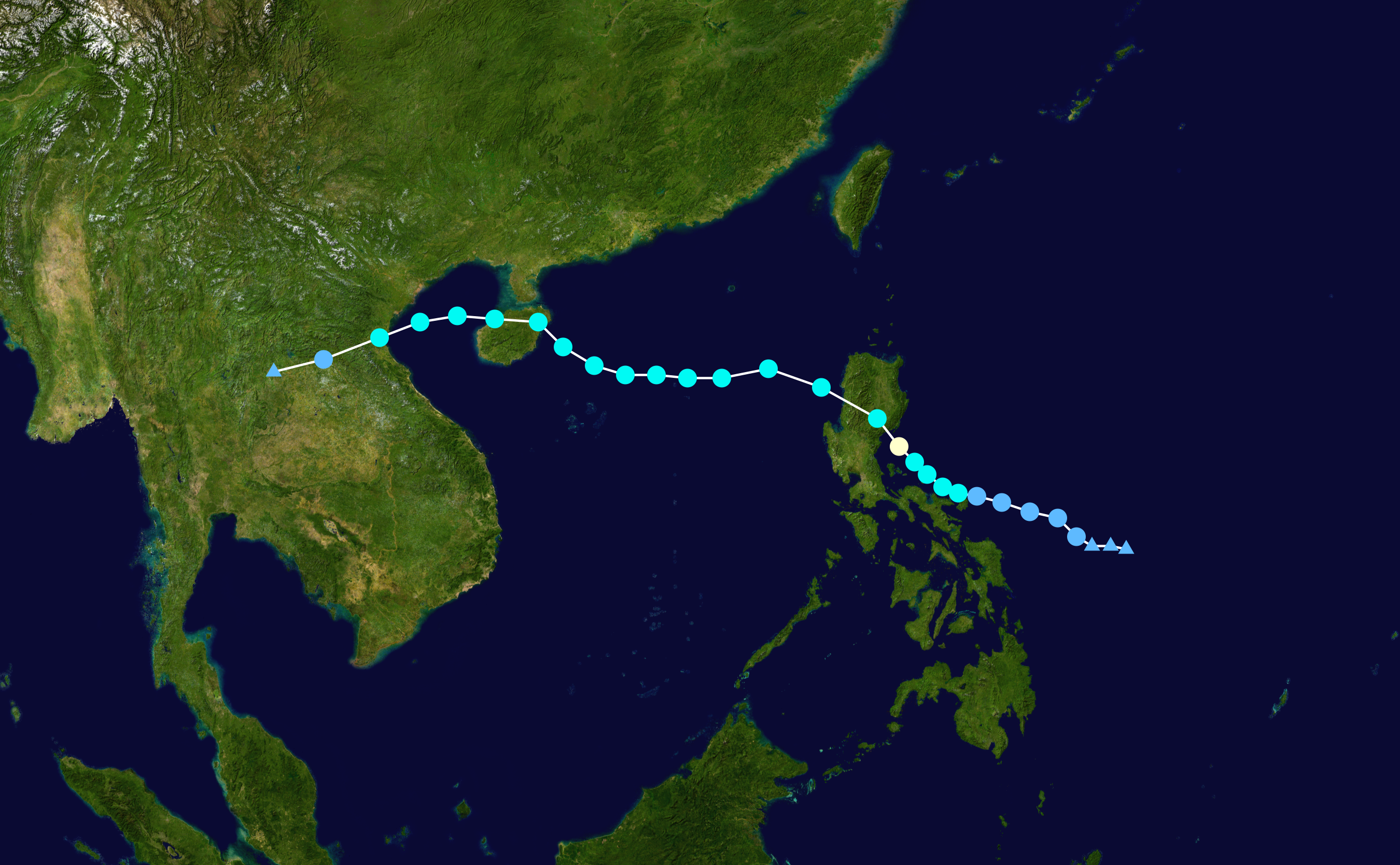
- Duration: July 24 – July 31
- Peak intensity: 95 km/h (60 mph) (10-min); 985 hPa (mbar)

Early on July 22, an area of low pressure formed to the east of Philippines. The system gradually drifted west over the next few days and late on July 24, the JTWC started monitoring the system as a Tropical Depression. Early the next day, the JMA upgraded the area of low pressure into a Tropical Depression. A few hours later, the PAGASA started monitoring the tropical depression and named it 'Juaning'. The system continued to drift westwards and strengthened rapidly, that on midnight, that day, the JMA further upgraded the system into a Tropical Storm, naming it Nock-Ten. Early on July 27, the JMA reported that Nock-ten continued to strengthen and upgraded it into a Severe Tropical Storm. A few hours later, the JTWC reported that Nock-ten rapidly intensified to a category 1 typhoon and made its landfall over northern Aurora (province) and started weakening. Later the same day, the JMA reported that Nock-ten has exited the Luzon island at Candon maintaining severe tropical storm strength. However, overnight, the storm rapidly weakened and the JMA downgraded it into a minor tropical storm the next day. However, on July 29, the storm gradually regained strength and approached south China coast at Qionghai, China. Later that day, the storm strengthened over land and headed north towards Hainan's provincial capital region Haikou. Over the next day, the storm drifted to the west and made landfall over Northern Vietnam. The lowest atmospheric pressure during the storm was 984.6 hPa (29.08 inHg), recorded at a weather station in Tĩnh Gia (Thanh Hoá). The storm weakened rapidly and at midnight that day, the JMA, issuing their final warning on the system, downgraded it into a tropical low.

The provinces of Albay and Camarines were reported to be completely flooded by the rain. Minor damage to rice crops was reported. Additional heavy rain was expected throughout the day while Nock-ten moved into the South China Sea. The number of missing was also pushed up to 31 after 25 crewmembers of a fishing boat were reported missing when their fishing boat was caught in the storm off Masbate. Nock-ten suspended all classes in Luzon from pre-school to college levels on July 26 and 27. In Northern Luzon, Nock-ten poured down heavy rainfall becoming widespread flooding in the area. The national roads were impassable and landslides were also reported. About 26 domestic flights were cancelled from July 26 to 27 due to heavy rains and strong winds.

=== Typhoon Muifa (Kabayan) ===
- Very strong typhoon (JMA)
- Category 5 super typhoon (SSHWS)
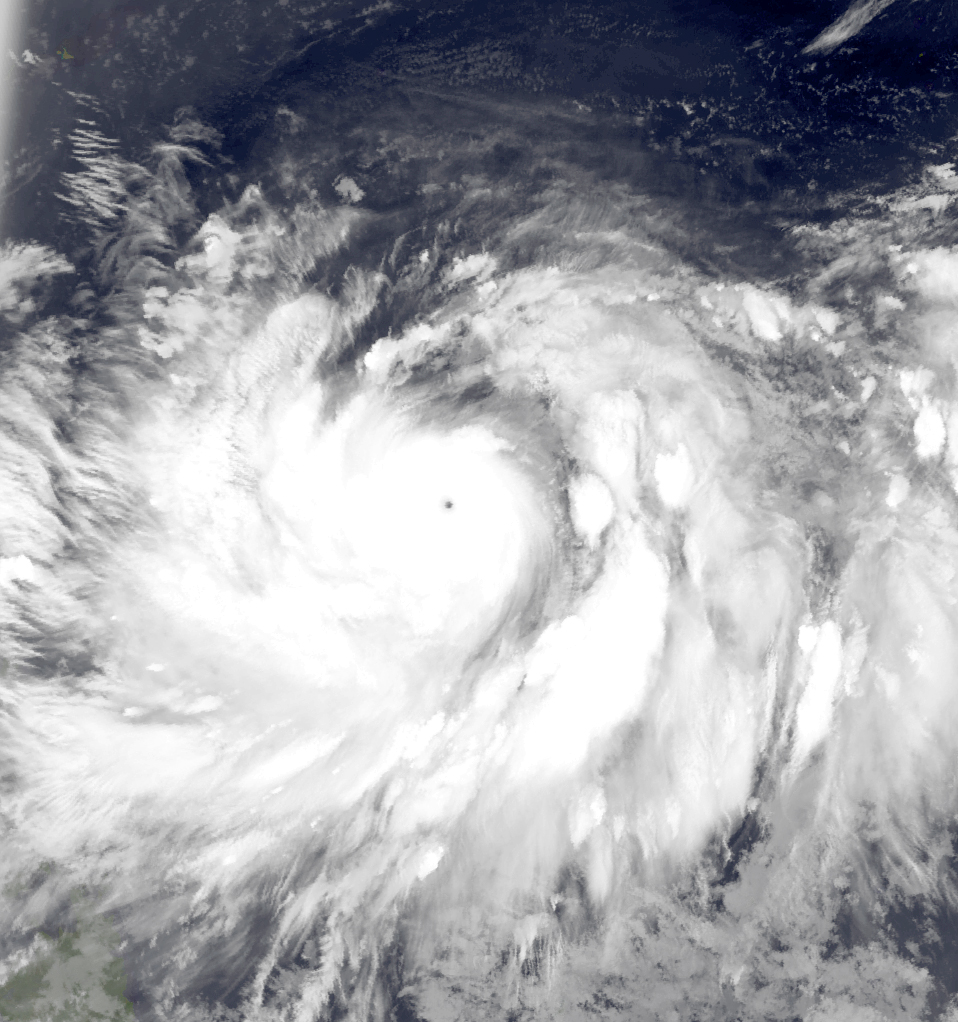
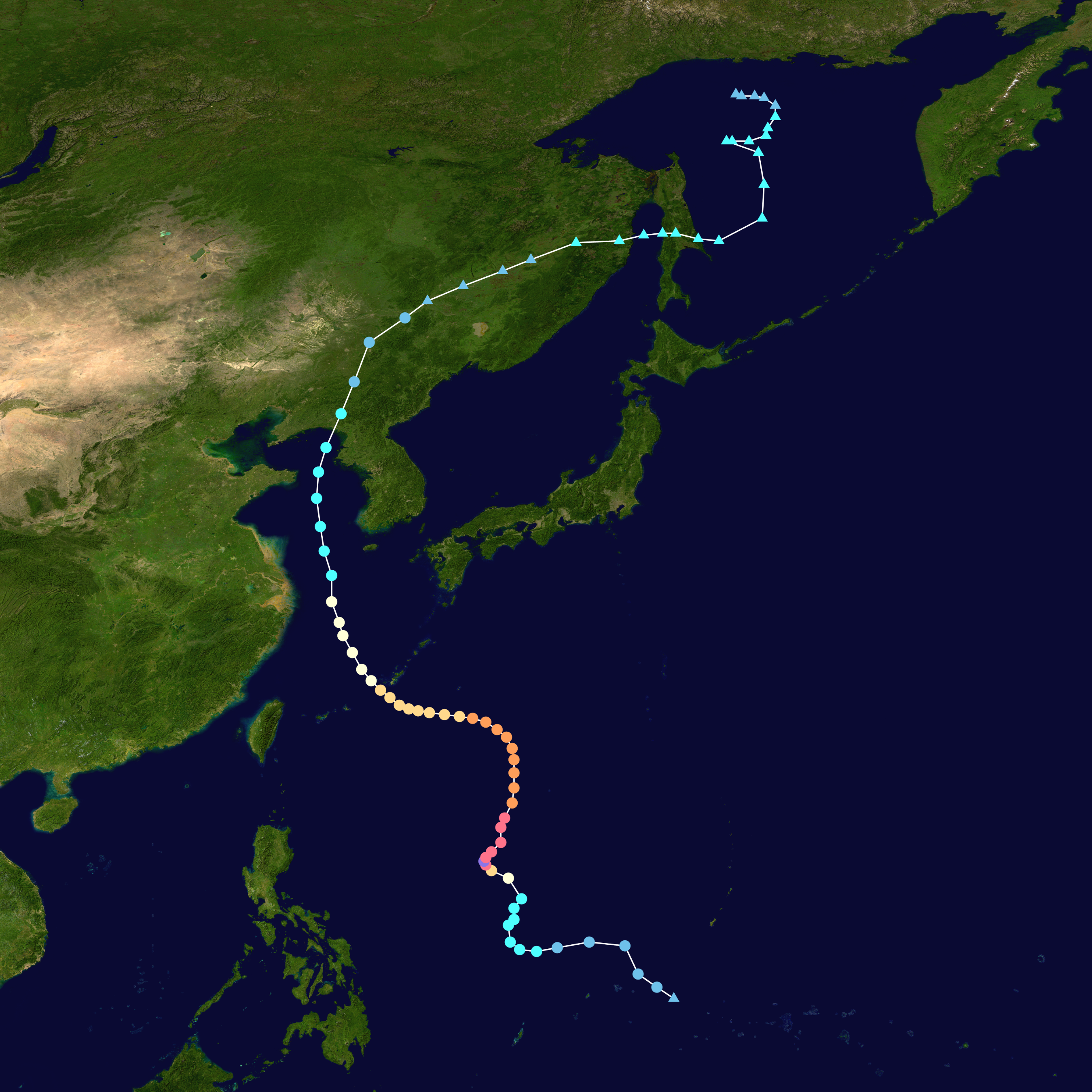
- Duration: July 27 – August 9
- Peak intensity: 175 km/h (110 mph) (10-min); 930 hPa (mbar)

Late on July 23, an area of low pressure formed to the southeast of Chuuk. the system gradually drifted to the west and on July 25, the JTWC upgraded the low-pressure area to a tropical depression. At that time, it was located approximately 505 nautical miles (935 km; 581 mi) to the west of Guam. At midnight, that day, the JMA started monitoring the system as a tropical depression. Early on July 28, the JTWC upgraded the system into a Tropical Storm. A few hours later, the JMA too upgraded the system to a tropical storm, naming it Muifa. Soon, the storm moved into the Philippine area of responsibility and the PAGASA named it Kabayan. The storm gradually drifted north over the next day maintaining strength. On the night of July 29, Muifa was upgraded into a severe tropical storm. Overnight, the storm strengthened rapidly and was upgraded into a typhoon the next morning. The storm strengthened so rapidly, and the JTWC reported that the storm's peak winds were reaching 140 knots (260 km/h; 160 mph) (1-min sustained), as it strengthened into a Category 5 Typhoon. However, the typhoon couldn't maintain Category 5 strength for a long time. According to the JTWC, On July 31, the typhoon interacted with an upper-level trough and weakened into a Category 4 typhoon. The system gradually moved north, then turned west and drifted towards Okinawa, before turning northwest again, when it was finally downgraded to a tropical storm by the JTWC. Soon afterwards, the JMA too downgraded Muifa to a Severe Tropical storm. After weakening to a tropical storm, Muifa made landfall at the estuary of the Yalu River on August 8, and the JTWC issued the final warning. Early on August 9, Muifa weakened to a tropical depression over northeast China and became a low-pressure area later.

Muifa killed 2 men, as their boat was capsized in the vicinity of Hagonoy, Bulacan and Pampanga Delta. Due to the southwest monsoon enhanced by Muifa, it caused heavy rains in several parts of Luzon including Metro Manila. Early on August 2, Malacañang Palace suspended government offices and pre-school to college level in NCR. Nearby provinces like Calabarzon (Region IV-A) also suspended their classes. In Marikina, 200 residents or 31 families living in communities along the Marikina River sought shelter in evacuation centers.

=== Tropical Depression Lando ===
- Tropical depression (JMA)
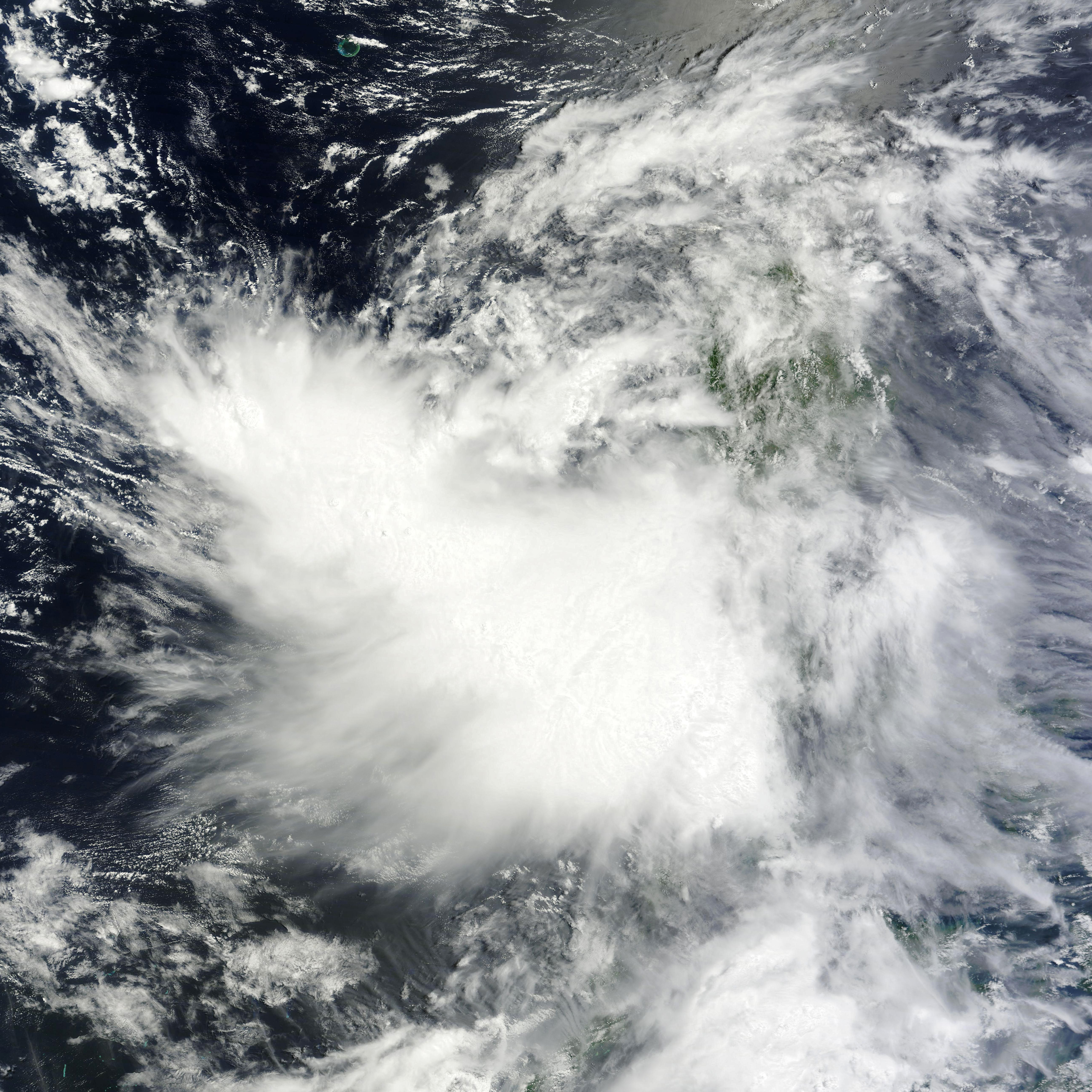
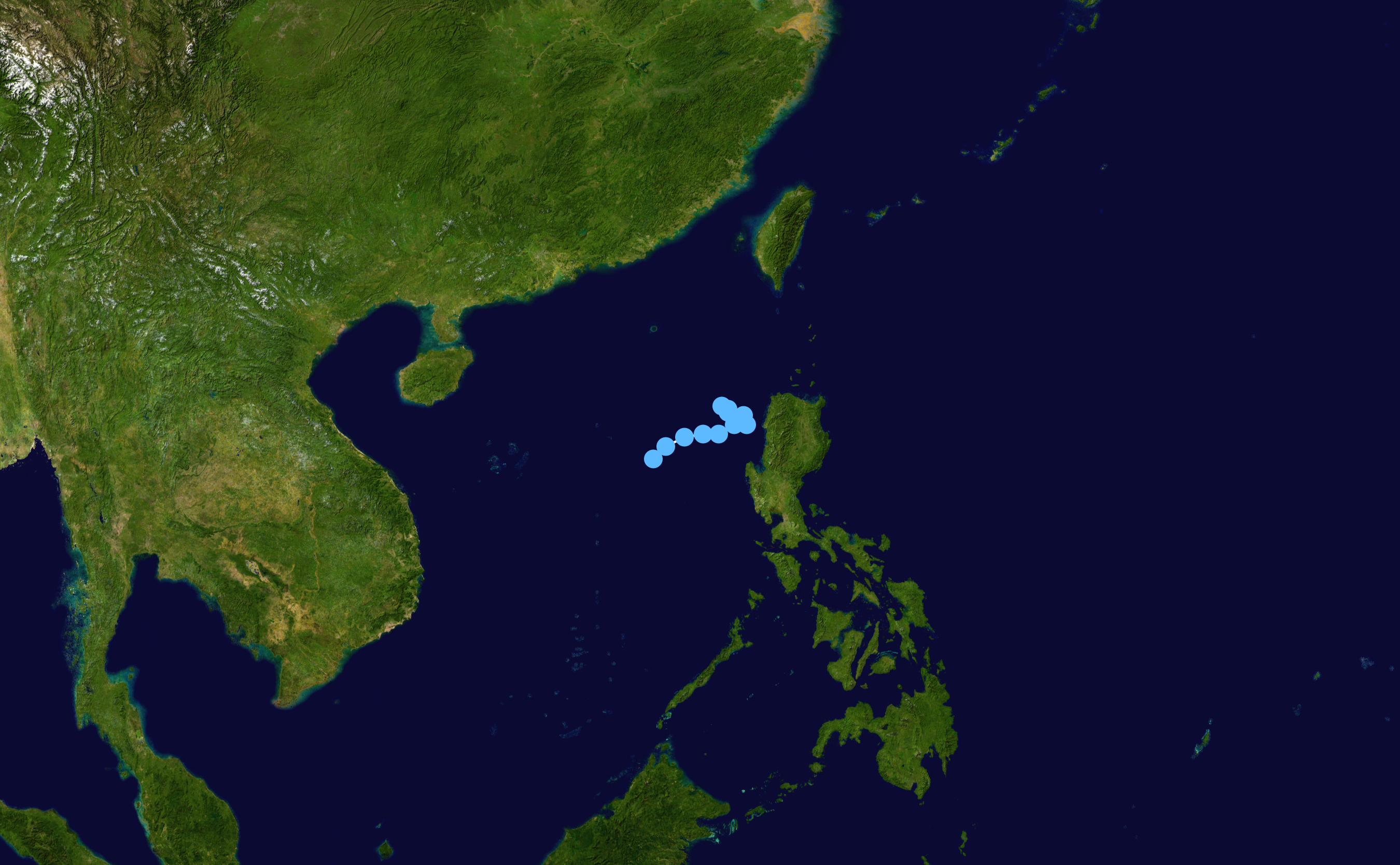
- Duration: July 31 – August 2
- Peak intensity: 45 km/h (30 mph) (10-min); 1002 hPa (mbar)

On July 31, the JMA reported that a tropical depression had developed about 500 km (310 mi) to the north west of Manila in the Philippines. However, because of the outflow from Typhoon Mufia, the deep convection that surrounded the system was being sheared off to the west of the systems low level circulation center. During that day the depression moved towards the north slowly, before PAGASA named it as Lando, however during the next day they reported that the depression had weakened into a low-pressure area and released their final advisory on it. After PAGASA issued their final advisory, the JMA continued to monitor the depression for another 24 hours before late on August 2, the JMA dropped the system from their advisories as it dissipated.

=== Severe Tropical Storm Merbok ===
- Severe tropical storm (JMA)
- Category 1 typhoon (SSHWS)
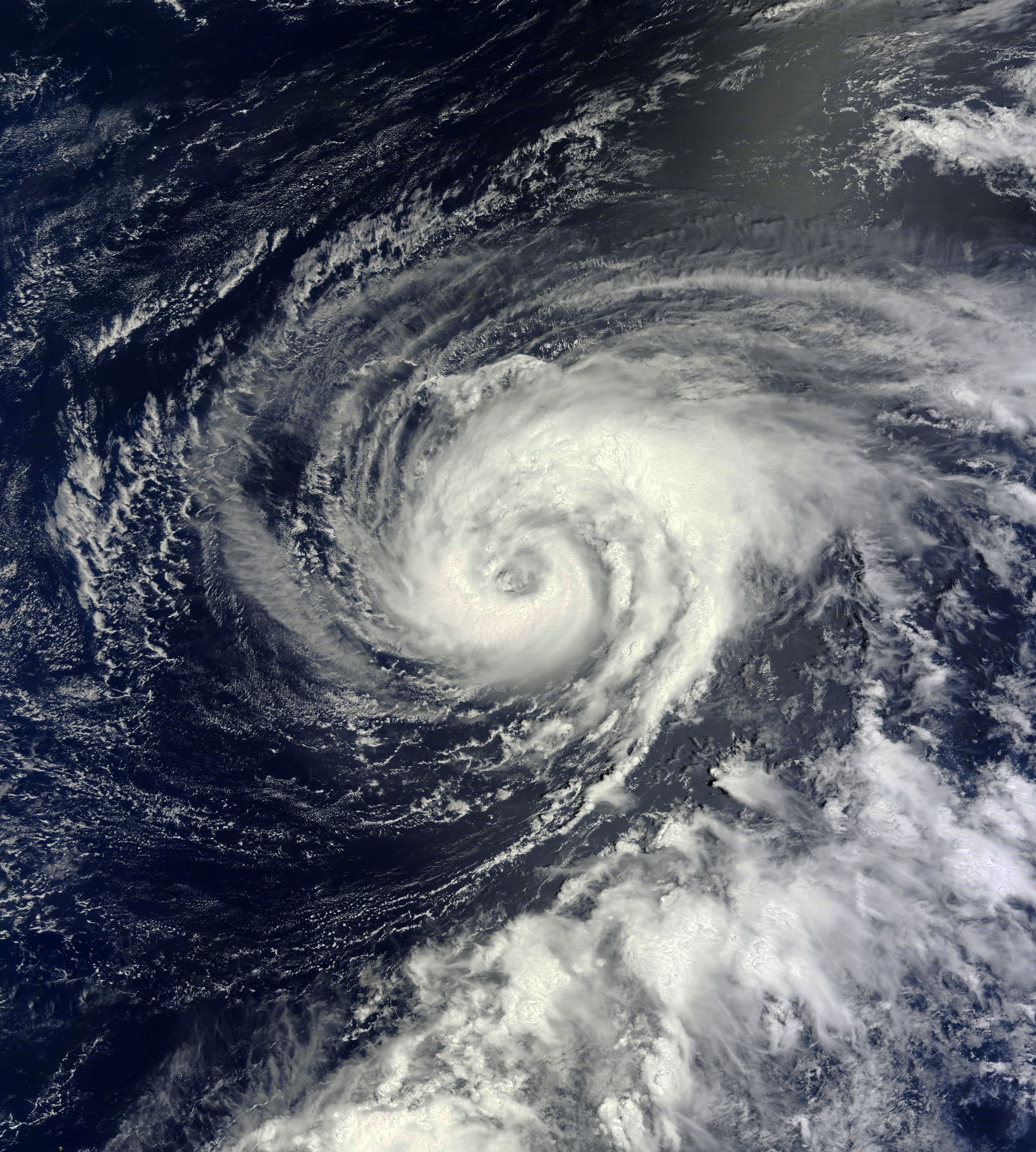
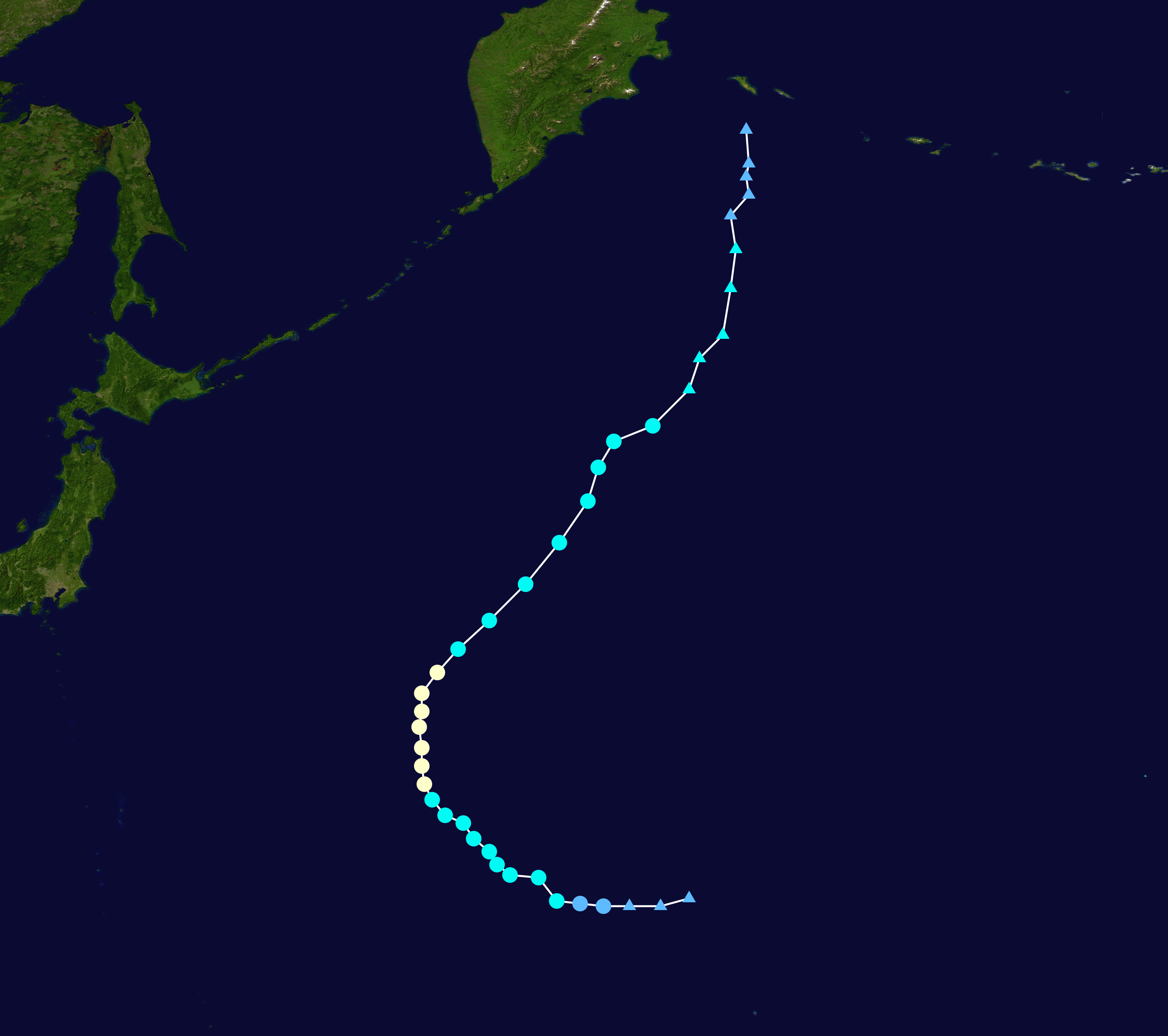
- Duration: August 2 – August 9
- Peak intensity: 95 km/h (60 mph) (10-min); 980 hPa (mbar)

Early on August 2, the JMA upgraded an area of low pressure near Wake Island to a tropical depression. The system intensified rapidly and just six hours later, the JMA upgraded the system to a tropical storm, naming it Merbok. Soon, the JTWC started monitoring the system as a tropical depression and upgraded it to a tropical storm later. Merbok began to move westward slowly, but soon afterwards, it turned northwest and gradually drifted in that direction. Late on August 5, the JMA upgraded Merbok into a severe tropical storm. Early on August 6, the JTWC upgraded Merbok into a Category 1 typhoon 960 mi (1,540 km) east-southeast of Tokyo, Japan. Early the next day, the storm's winds reached a peak of 90 mph (140 km/h) (1-min sustained). Later that day, the system was caught in moderate vertical wind shear and started weakening. On August 8, the system started accelerating northwards at a speed of 23 mph (37 km/h) and convection gradually diminished due to colder sea surface temperatures and unfavorable conditions. As a result, the JMA reported that Merbok had weakened into a tropical storm. Later on that day, the system started showing extratropical characteristics as the convection near the eye dissipated rapidly. Thus, the JTWC issued their final warning on the system reporting that the system was no longer tropical. Later, the JMA, also noting that Merbok had lost its tropical characteristics, issued their final advisory.

=== Tropical Depression 13W ===
- Tropical depression (JMA)
- Tropical depression (SSHWS)
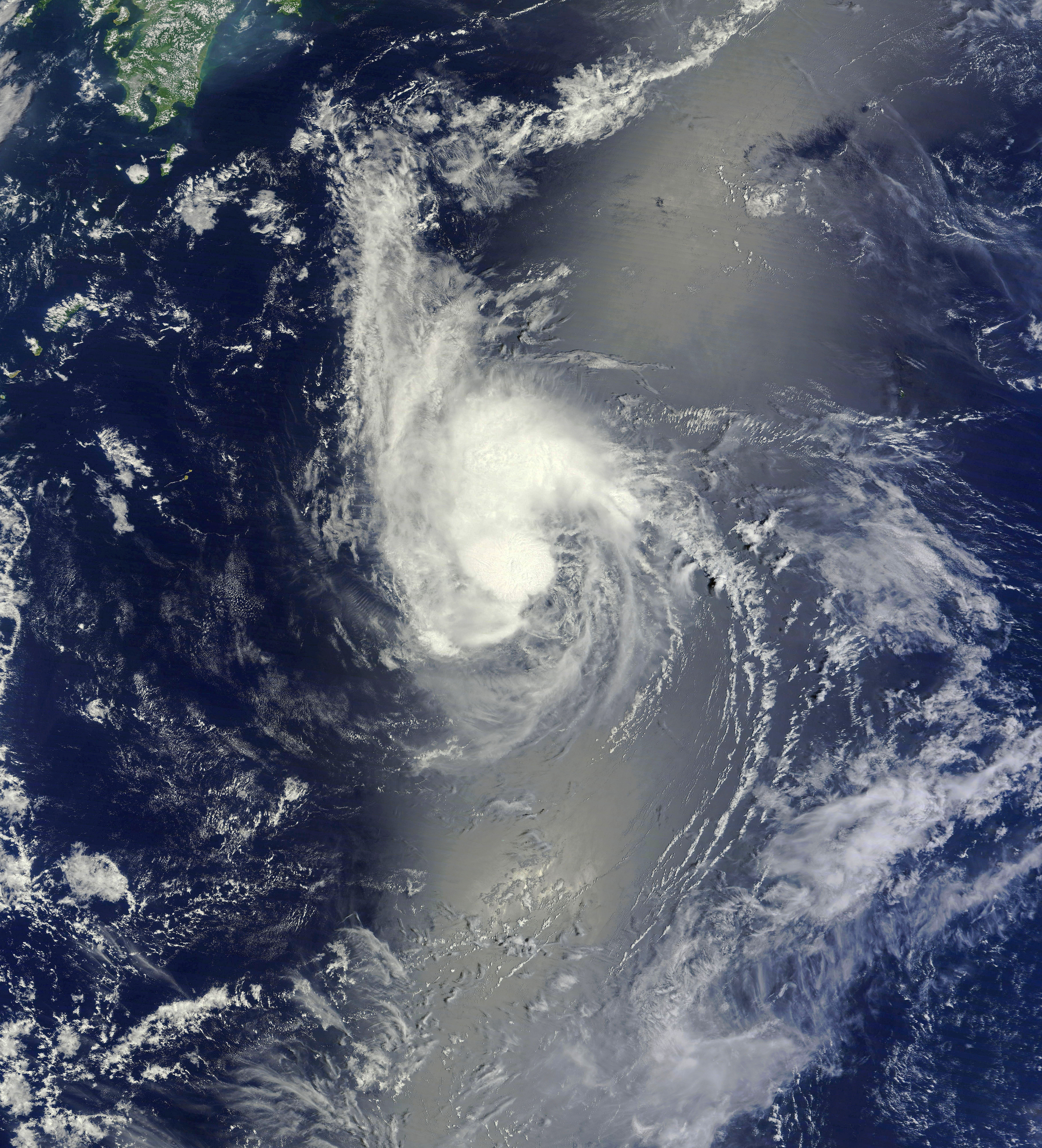
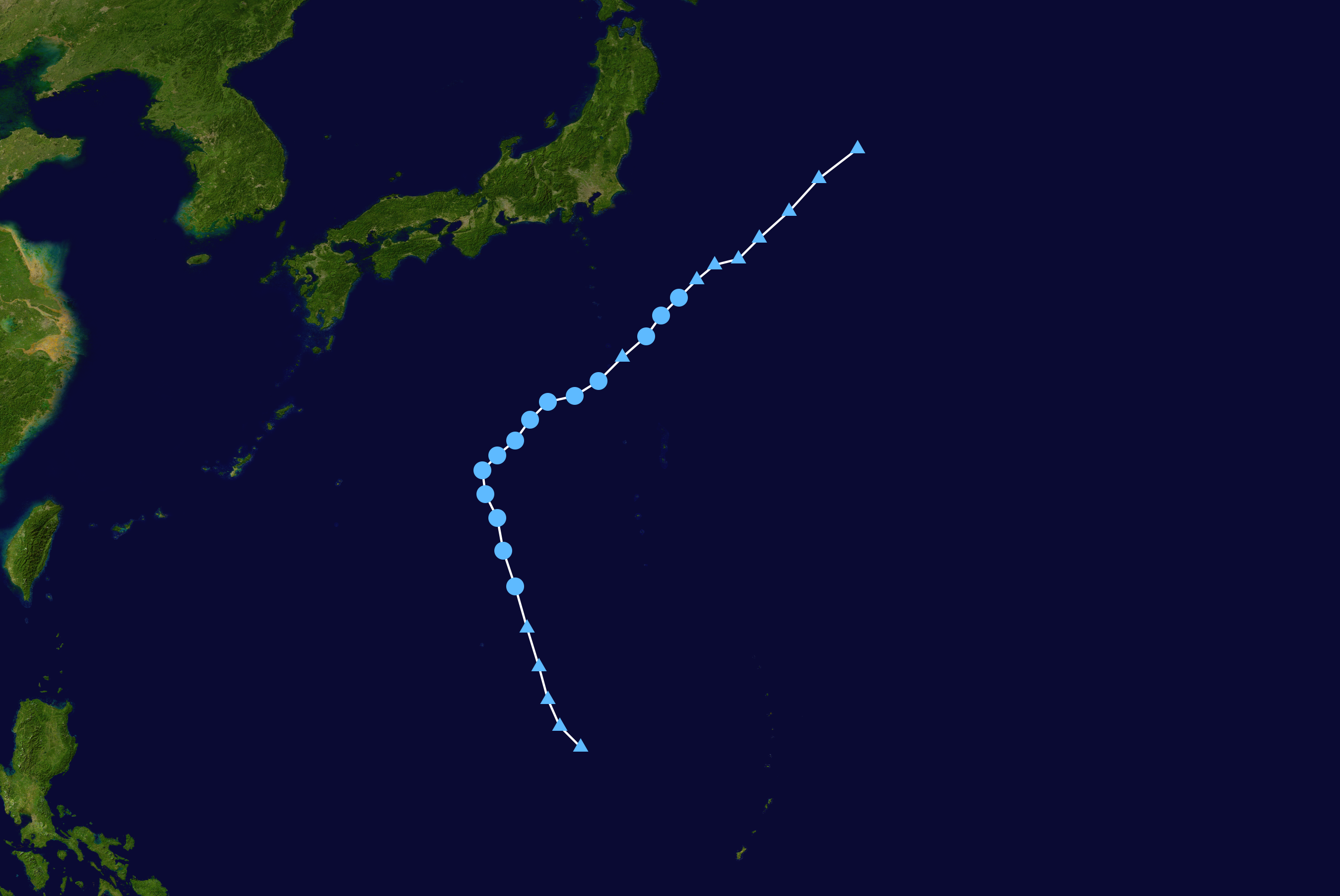
- Duration: August 8 – August 14
- Peak intensity: 55 km/h (35 mph) (10-min); 1002 hPa (mbar)

A tropical depression gradually drifted north and early on August 10, the JTWC started monitoring the system as a tropical depression and designated it 13W. Initially, the JMA predicted the system to strengthen into a tropical storm, but on August 11, as it moved further north into cool waters and unfavourable conditions, the JMA issued their final advisory. Later, the JTWC too issued their final warning on the system, reporting that it had moved into a subtropical ridge and was expected to dissipate into a remnant low. However, the JMA continued to track the remnants as a weak tropical depression over the next few days until the system dissipated on August 15.

=== Typhoon Nanmadol (Mina) ===
- Very strong typhoon (JMA)
- Category 5 super typhoon (SSHWS)
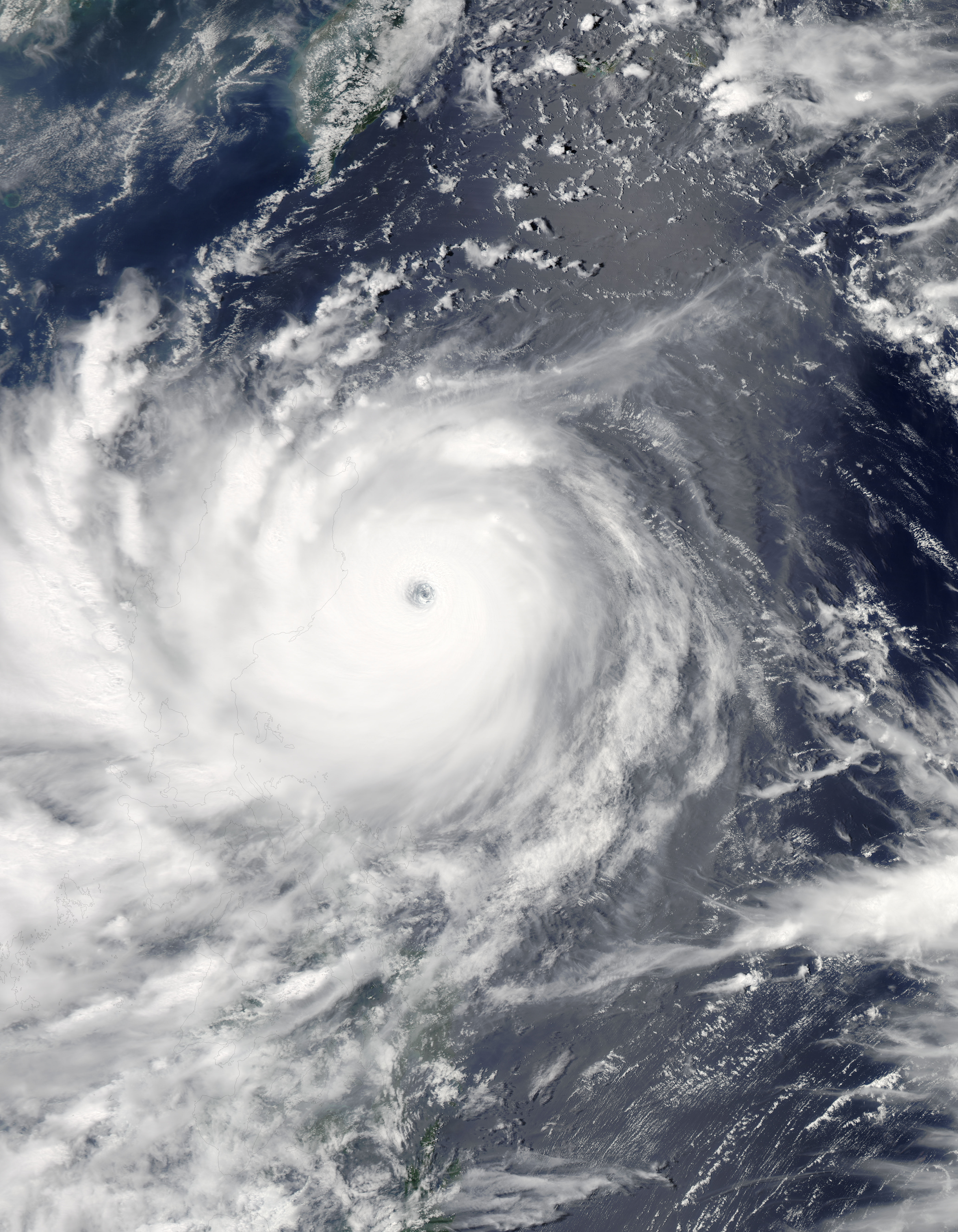
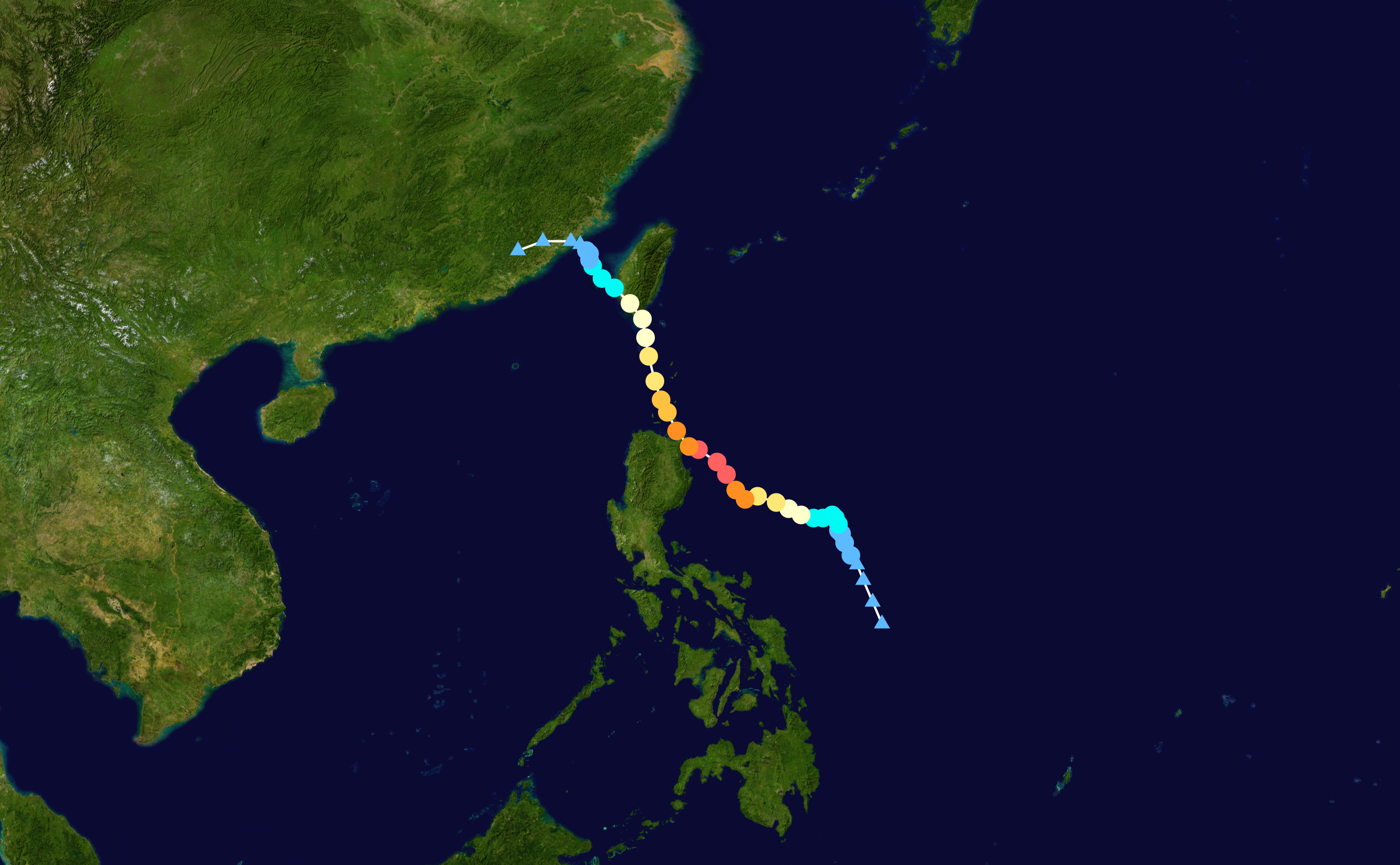
- Duration: August 21 – August 31
- Peak intensity: 185 km/h (115 mph) (10-min); 925 hPa (mbar)

Late on August 19, an area of low pressure developed north of Palau. Early on August 20, the system became better organized and developed a low-level circulation center (LLCC). The system then turned north and continued to drift north until August 21, when the JMA upgraded the low-pressure area to a tropical depression east of Philippines. The JTWC also issued a Tropical Cyclone Formation Alert (TCFA), reporting that the system was becoming better organized. Later that day, the PAGASA started monitoring the system as a tropical depression and named it Mina. Late on August 22, the system became more well organized prompting the JTWC to initiate advisories on the system, designating it 14W. On August 23, the JMA upgraded 14W to a tropical storm, naming it Nanmadol. Overnight, the system continued to intensify and early on August 24, the JMA upgraded Nanmadol to a severe tropical storm. Later that day, convective banding improved and Nanmadol developed an eye-like feature. As a result, Nanmadol continued to intensify rapidly and became a typhoon, by midnight. Nanmadol continued to drift north east and made landfall over Gonzaga, Cagayan, Philippines with strong winds of over 110 mph (180 km/h). Nanmadol weakened significantly after interacting with land and early on August 28, the JMA downgraded Nanmadol to a severe tropical storm. Late on August 28, Nanmadol made its second landfall over Taimali in the Taitung County of Taiwan and started weakening. Landfall weakened the system rapidly prompting the JMA to downgrade Nanmadol to a tropical storm with winds of under 50 mph (80 km/h). Soon, it started experiencing strong wind shear and continued weakening. The shear pushed convection approximately 70 km (43 mi) south of the LLCC. The system also accelerated towards China at 8 knots (15 km/h; 9.2 mph) and weakened to a minimal tropical storm. After its third landfall over Fujian, Nanmadol weakened rapidly prompting both the JTWC and the JMA to issue their final warnings on the system.

On August 27, five people died after Nanmadol caused landslides. At least two Filipino fishermen were reported to be missing after Nanmadol's strong winds whipped up large waves. In September 2011, the JTWC upgraded Nanmadol to a Category 5 super typhoon in post-analysis.

=== Severe Tropical Storm Talas ===
- Severe tropical storm (JMA)
- Tropical storm (SSHWS)
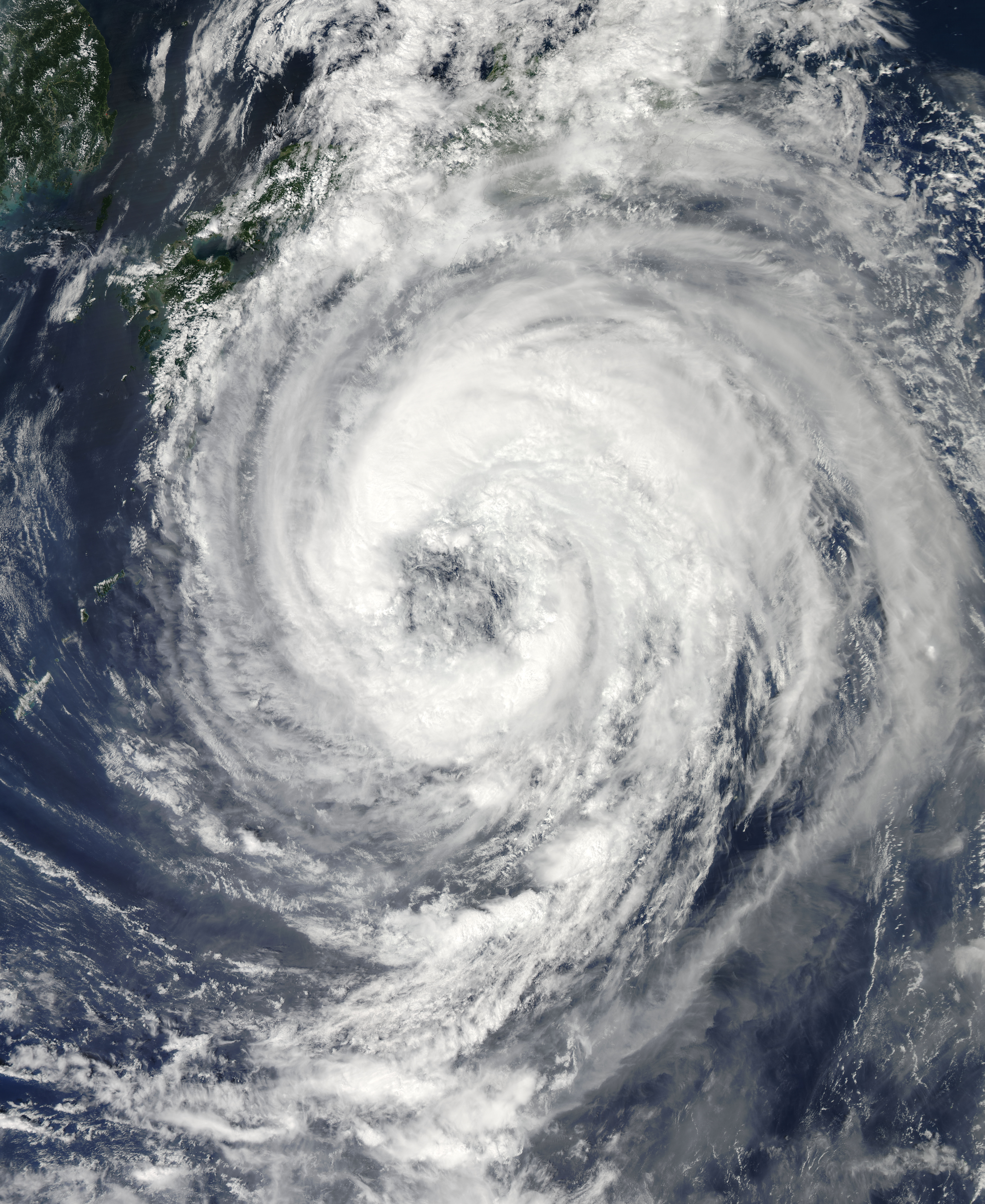
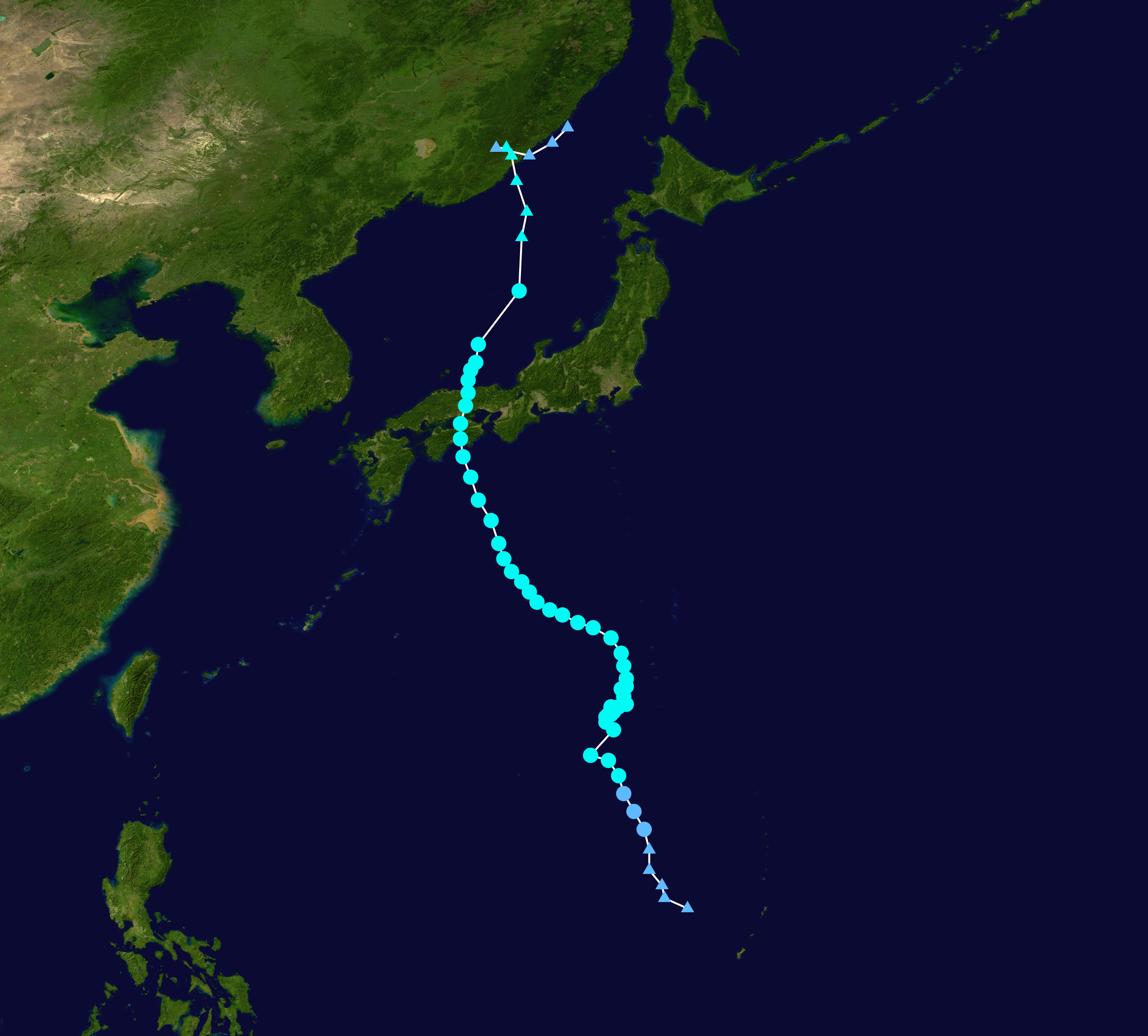
- Duration: August 23 – September 5
- Peak intensity: 95 km/h (60 mph) (10-min); 970 hPa (mbar)

Late on August 21, a low-pressure area developed to the west of Guam, which is associated from the remnants of a tropical depression. At midnight that day, the system became sufficiently well organized that the JMA started tracking it as a tropical depression. On August 23, the system moved into an environment of low wind shear and warm sea surface temperatures prompting the JTWC to issue a TCFA on it. By August 25, the system grew strong enough that the JMA upgraded it to a tropical storm, naming it Talas. Later that day, the JTWC followed suit and initiated advisories on Talas. Talas continued to strengthen and by midnight that day, it became a severe tropical storm. Over the next few days, Talas continued to drift north very slowly until late on August 29, when the JMA upgraded Talas to a typhoon. Soon, a subtropical ridge to the west of the storm weakened and the subtropical ridge to the east of the system pushed Talas to the west. As a result, Talas accelerated towards the west maintaining strength and outflow. An upper-level cyclone over the system suppressed the convection and kept it from reaching the center. Therefore, Talas remained weak and did not strengthen further. Convection never managed to consolidate the center and convective banding remained well away from the fully exposed low-level circulation center. The convective banding continued to expand more and more with the outer rainbands already brushing parts of Japan. Coastal areas in the nation have already reported gale-force winds several hours before landfall, while the Omega block continued to drive Talas towards the nation. Land interaction weakened Talas, prompting the JMA to downgrade Talas from a typhoon to a severe tropical storm with winds of under 60 knots (110 km/h; 69 mph). Early on September 3, Talas made landfall over Aki, Japan. After landfall, Talas accelerated north at over 13 knots (24 km/h; 15 mph) and its central convection became significantly eroded and was displaced to the north-east as Talas was exposed to a very strong wind shear of over 50 knots (93 km/h; 58 mph) that made the LLCC very distorted and difficult to pin-point. Talas was embedded in a baroclinic zone and the JTWC anticipated an extratropical transition, which prompted them to issue their final warning on the system. On September 5, the JMA issued their final warning on the system, reporting that Talas has become extratropical on the Sea of Japan.

In October 2011, the JMA upgraded Talas as a typhoon in post-analysis. But during 2014, the JMA downgraded Talas again to a severe tropical storm on another post-analysis.

=== Tropical Storm Noru ===
- Tropical storm (JMA)
- Tropical storm (SSHWS)
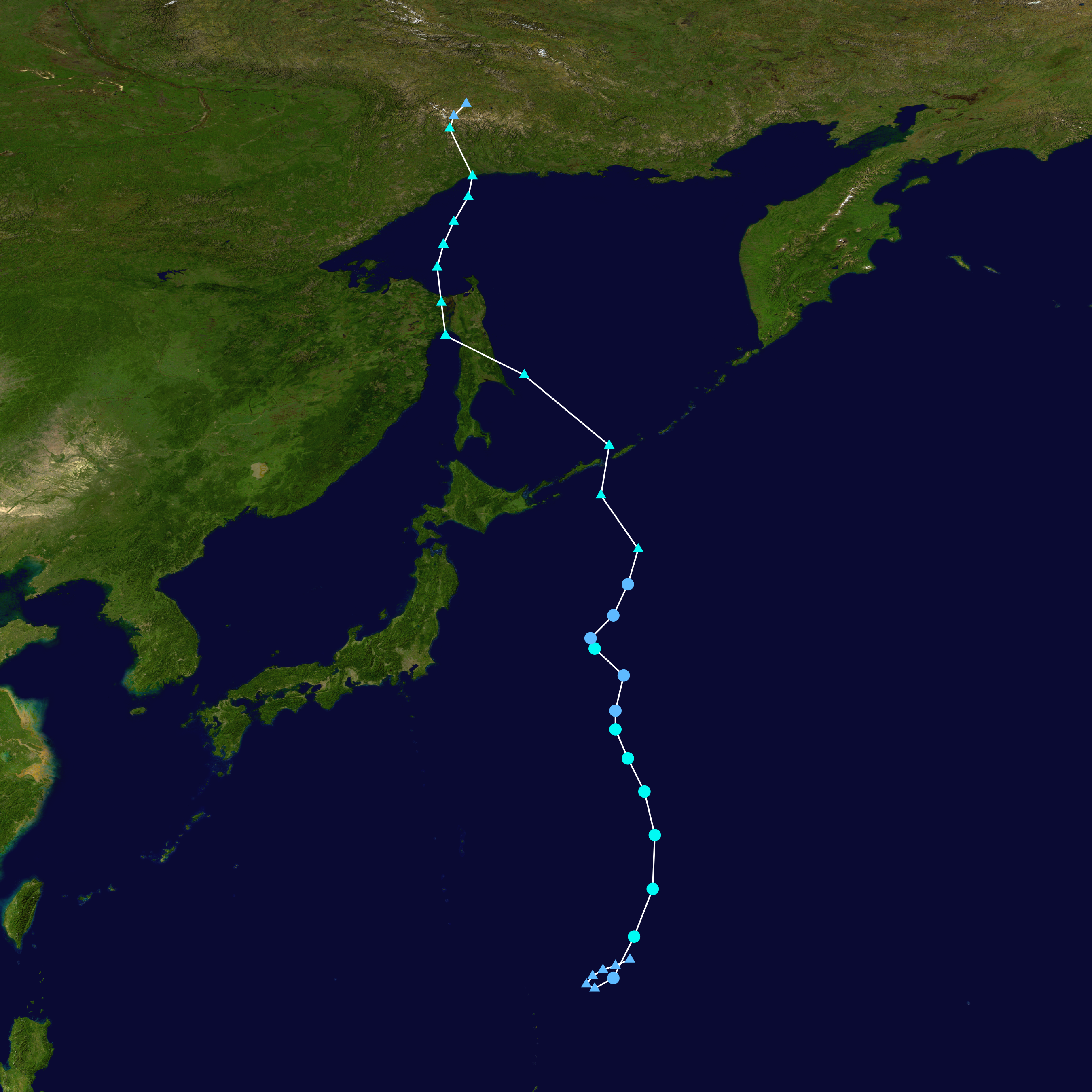
- Duration: September 2 – September 6
- Peak intensity: 75 km/h (45 mph) (10-min); 990 hPa (mbar)

During September 1, the JTWC reported that a tropical disturbance had developed within the outflow of Tropical Storm Talas, about 980 km (610 mi) to the northeast of Hagåtña, Guam. Deep convection surrounded the systems low-level circulation but it was not organising as it was impacted, by a moderate to strong amount of vertical wind shear, which was produced by Talas' outflow and a TUTT cell to the northeast of the system. However, during that day vertical wind shear surrounding the system relaxed and the system started to consolidate, while it moved towards the north-northwest around a subtropical ridge of high pressure. Early the next day, because the system continued to consolidate the JTWC issued a Tropical Cyclone Formation Alert, while the JMA reported that the system had become a tropical depression. Over the next 24 hours, the system continued to consolidate as it moved towards the north-northwest before the JTWC initiated advisories on the system as it intensified into Tropical Storm 16W, however the JMA did not name it as Noru until 06:00 UTC on September 4. As it was named, the JTWC reported that Noru had peaked with 1-minute windspeeds of 85 km/h (55 mph), while the JMA reported peak 10-minute sustained wind speeds of 75 km/h (45 mph). On September 5, after it had peaked in intensity, a fresh Tutt cell developed over the system and started to inhibit outflow and shear the convection away, which meant as a result that the system started to weaken. Over the next two days, Noru went through an extratropical transition before becoming an extratropical cyclone on September 6, about 1,150 km (710 mi) to the northeast of Tokyo, Japan. As an extratropical cyclone, Noru continued its movement towards the north-northwest and affected Sakhalin and the Kuril Islands, before it moved over Okhotsk on September 9, and dissipated.

=== Tropical Storm Kulap (Nonoy) ===
- Tropical storm (JMA)
- Tropical storm (SSHWS)
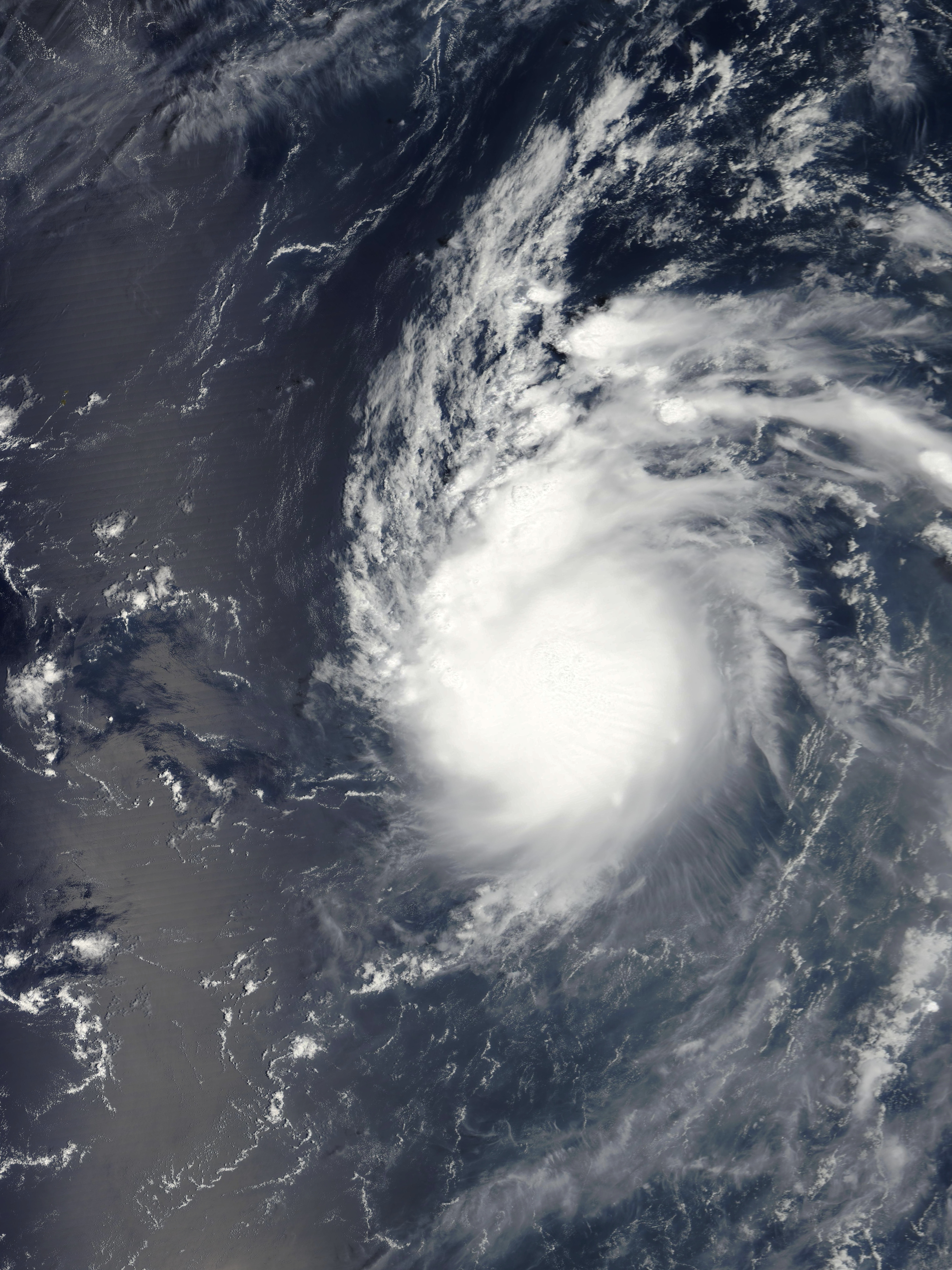
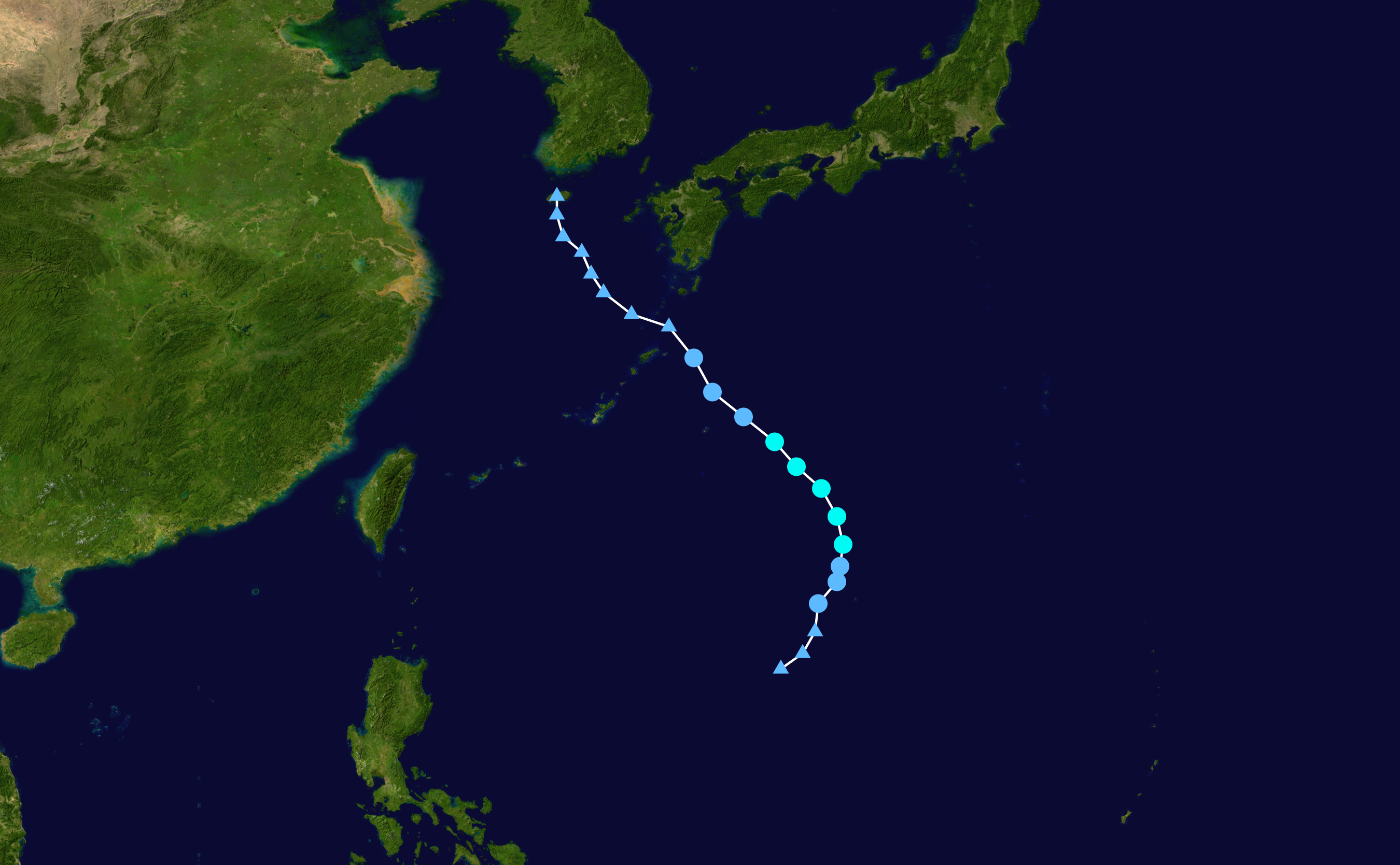
- Duration: September 6 – September 11
- Peak intensity: 65 km/h (40 mph) (10-min); 1000 hPa (mbar)

Late on September 4, an area of low pressure developed to the southeast of Okinawa, Japan. Over the next two days, the system drifted north and developed a well defined LLCC with organized convective banding, prompting the JMA to upgrade the low-pressure area to a tropical depression. On September 7, convection consolidated the low-level circulation center very well with tightly curved banding wrapped into it. Also, high sea-surface temperatures and very low wind shear caused the system to undergo rapid deepening, prior to which, the JMA upgraded the system to a tropical storm and named it Kulap. However, the system stopped strengthening soon after as the LLCC became partially exposed and the convection was displaced to the south. Kulap remained small in size and dry air entering from the western periphery kept it from strengthening further. Wind shear increased, pushing convection approximately 180 nautical miles (330 km; 210 mi) south of the LLCC. Also, Kulap was located beneath a tropical upper tropospheric trough (TUTT cell) that caused subsidence. A mid-level subtropical steering ridge caused Kulap to track in a northwestward direction. On September 8, Kulap moved into the east-northeast periphery of the Philippine Area of Responsibility (PAR) prompting the PAGASA to start issuing advisories on the system, naming it Nonoy. However, Kulap quickly accelerated north and exited the PAR on the same evening, prompting the PAGASA to issued their final advisory on the system. After increasing wind shear caused further weakening, the JTWC downgraded Kulap to a tropical depression late on September 8. Early on September 10, the JMA too downgraded Kulap to a tropical depression, and continued to track Kulap's remnants as a tropical depression until it was finally absorbed by the weather front early on September 11.

=== Typhoon Roke (Onyok) ===
- Very strong typhoon (JMA)
- Category 4 typhoon (SSHWS)
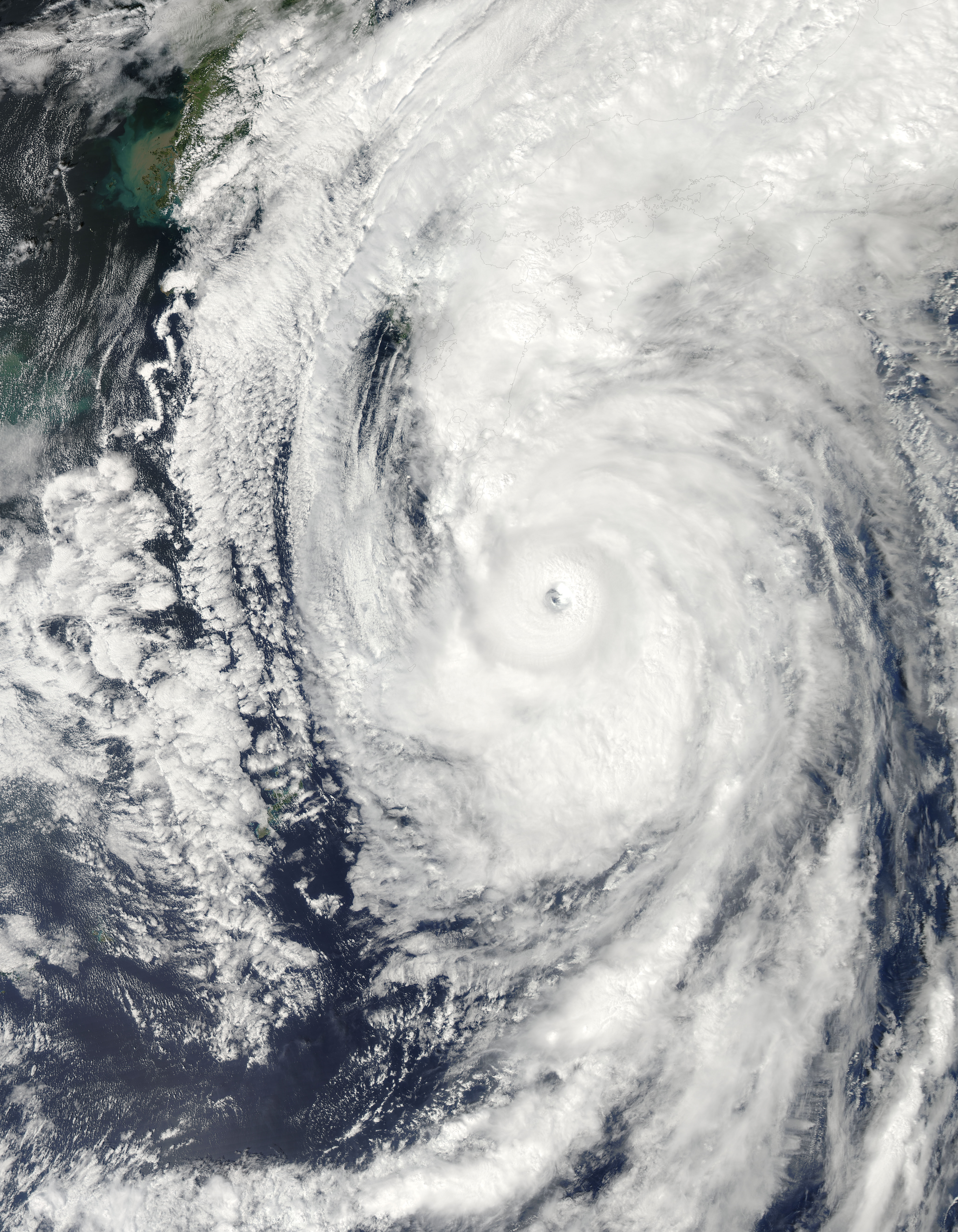
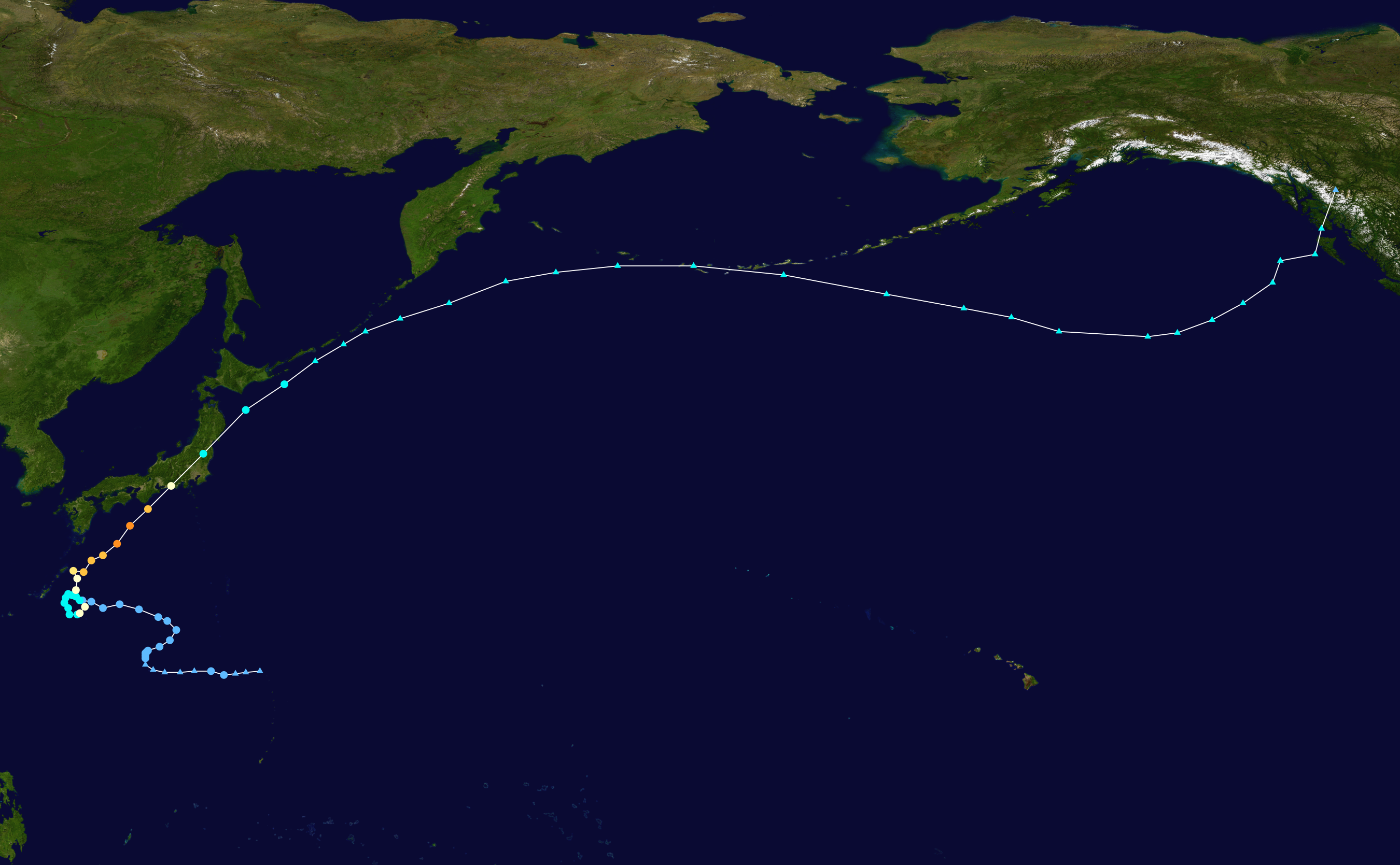
- Duration: September 9 – September 22
- Peak intensity: 155 km/h (100 mph) (10-min); 940 hPa (mbar)

Early on September 8, a cluster of thunderstorms came together as a low-pressure area with improving outflow and a developing low-level circulation center (LLCC). Later that day, the JMA upgraded the low-pressure area to a tropical depression north-northeast of the Northern Mariana Islands. Over the next two days, the system gradually drifted west and intensified slightly, prompting the JTWC to issue a Tropical Cyclone Formation Alert (TCFA) on it. Convection gradually consolidated the LLCC and the JTWC initiated advisories on the system on September 11, designating it with 18W. The next day, the depression drifted into the Philippine Area of Responsibility (PAR) and the PAGASA initiated advisories on the depression, naming it Onyok. However, just as similar to Kulap, Onyok also exited the PAR in 6 hours from entering the region. In an advisory, the JTWC reported that there were at least two more vortices associated with the system, that caused an abrupt, erratic movement. However, being located in an area of warm sea surface temperatures and low vertical wind shear, the depression continued to strengthen and on September 13, the JMA upgraded the depression to a tropical storm and named it Roke. On September 17, Roke developed a small, deep convective eye promoting the JMA to upgrade Roke to a severe tropical storm with winds of over 50 knots (93 km/h; 58 mph). Between September 19 and 20, Roke underwent explosive intensification, a more extreme case of rapid deepening that involves a tropical cyclone deepening at a rate of at least 2.5 mbar per hour for a minimum of 12 hours. Also, they added that Roke developed a 10 nautical miles (19 km; 12 mi) eye and a good poleward outflow channel. On September 21, Typhoon Roke made landfall over Hamamatsu, Japan at about 05:00 UTC (14:00 JST). Soon Roke started weakening as cloud tops started getting warmed up and eye diameter started to decrease. However, the system still maintained a near radial outflow and the convective structure continued to remain organized that kept Roke from dissipating rapidly. Although Roke entered a de-intensification phase, it still had plenty of strength that posed a great threat to regions of Japan. Being located approximately 330 nautical miles (610 km; 380 mi) southwest of Yokosuka, the typhoon accelerated north-northwestward at approximately 16 knots (30 km/h; 18 mph) with winds of over 100 knots (190 km/h; 120 mph) (1-min sustained) being a Category 3 typhoon on the SSHS. Being embedded in the baroclinic zone, Roke started its extratropical transition. Also, land interaction severely weakened the storm to a minimal Category 1 typhoon with winds of under 70 knots (130 km/h; 81 mph) (1-min sustained). Only six hours later, the storm further weakened and accelerated northeastward at approximately 31 knots (57 km/h; 36 mph) with rapidly dissipating deep convection completely sheared to the northeast of the LLCC. As a result, the JTWC ceased advisories on the storm, as it became fully extratropical.

=== Typhoon Sonca ===
- Typhoon (JMA)
- Category 2 typhoon (SSHWS)
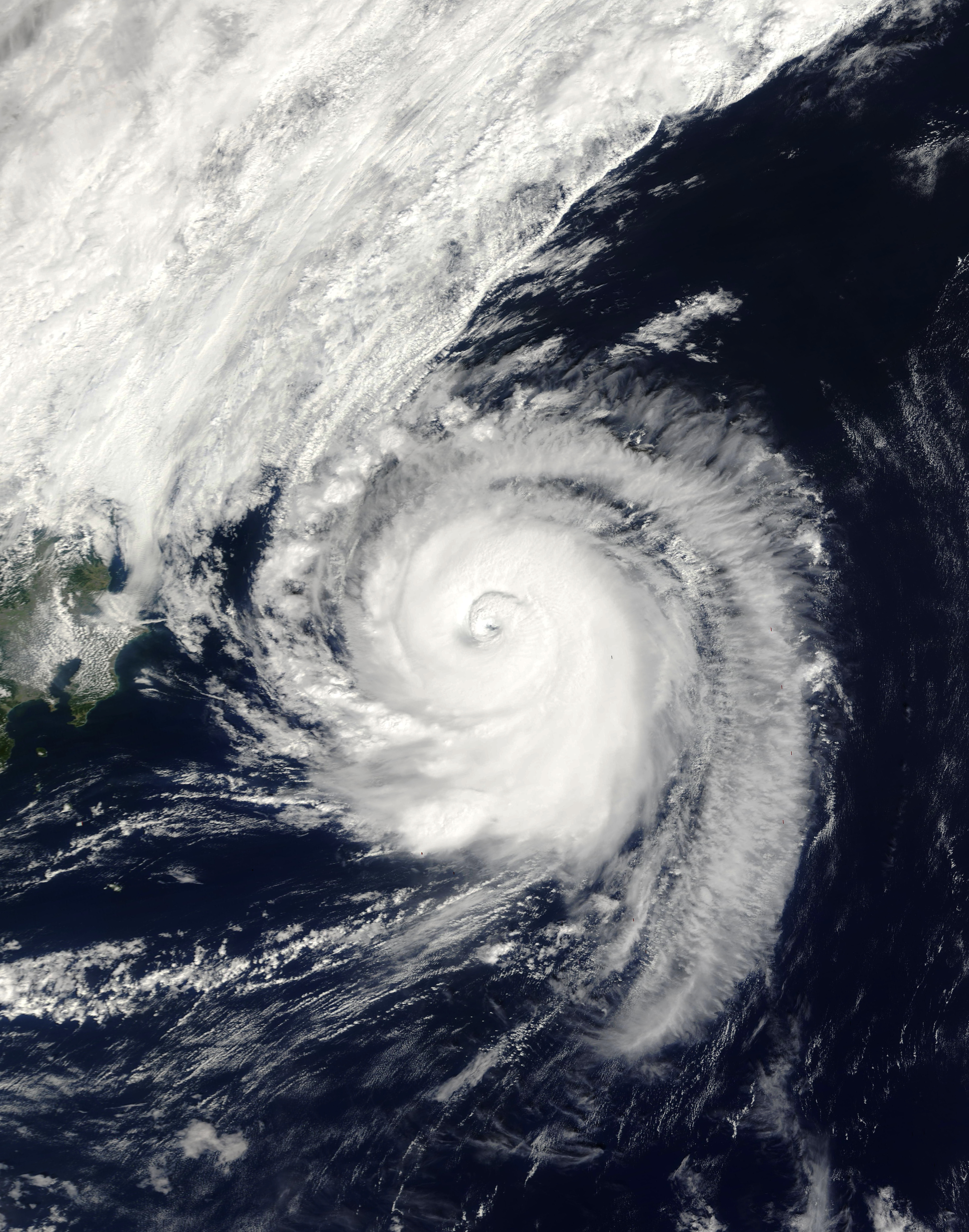
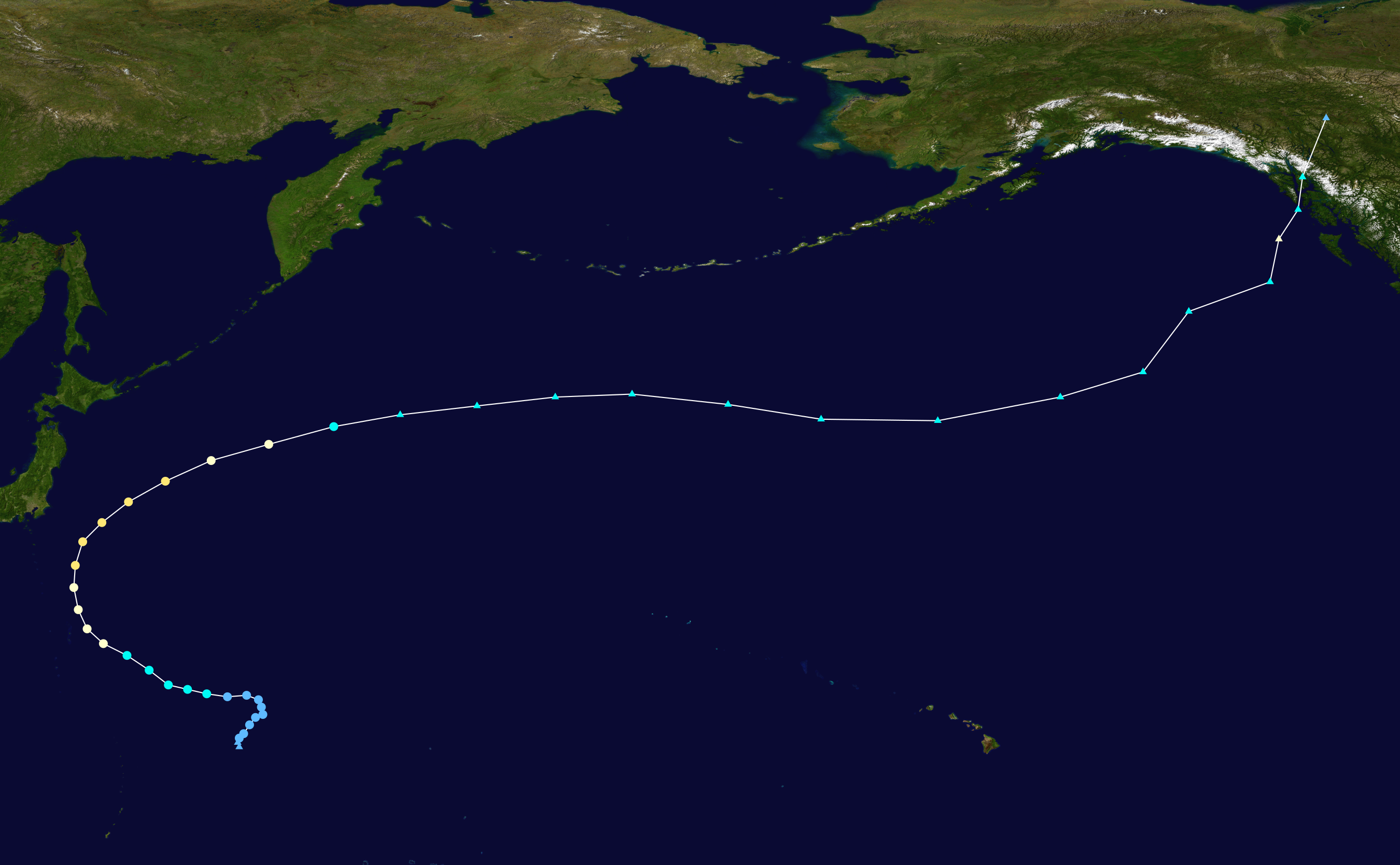
- Duration: September 14 – September 20
- Peak intensity: 130 km/h (80 mph) (10-min); 970 hPa (mbar)

Early on September 13, a low-pressure area formed northeast of the Northern Mariana Islands. The system gradually drifted north and steadily intensified until the next day when the JMA upgraded the system to a tropical depression. Later on September 14, the JTWC issued a Tropical Cyclone Formation Alert (TCFA) on the system reporting that the system could intensify into a tropical storm within 24 hours from then. Convection rapidly consolidated the center with persistent, deep convection around the north-eastern periphery, prompting the JTWC to initiate advisories on the system, designating it with 19W. Soon, the JMA also initiated advisories on the system, upgrading it to Tropical Storm Sonca. In the begging, Sonca seemed to have intensified rapidly since formation, however, soon the storm weakened back to a minimal tropical storm because of dry air entering the LLCC that caused it to elongate and weaken. However, that was not for too long as vigorous convection persisted over the well defined LLCC with tightly curved banding wrapped in, Sonca continued to strengthen gradually and the JTWC reported winds of at least 50 knots (93 km/h; 58 mph) near the center. As Sonca continued to strengthen, and the JMA upgraded it to a severe tropical storm on September 17. Later that day, Sonca developed a large 10 nautical miles (19 km; 12 mi) ragged eye with deep convective banding tightly wrapped into it. As a result, Sonca strengthened more rapidly and by early the next day, it became a typhoon. On September 19, Sonca reached a peak intensity of 85 knots (157 km/h; 98 mph) (1-min mean) and 70 knots (130 km/h; 81 mph) (10-min mean) and soon the convection around the northern periphery started weakening. Being embedded in a baroclinic zone with low sea surface temperatures, Sonca started its extratropical transition late on September 19.

The transition took place relatively fast because of a frontal boundary and the JTWC reported that Sonca became extratropical early on September 20, while the JMA did the same later in the evening.

=== Typhoon Nesat (Pedring) ===
- Typhoon (JMA)
- Category 4 typhoon (SSHWS)
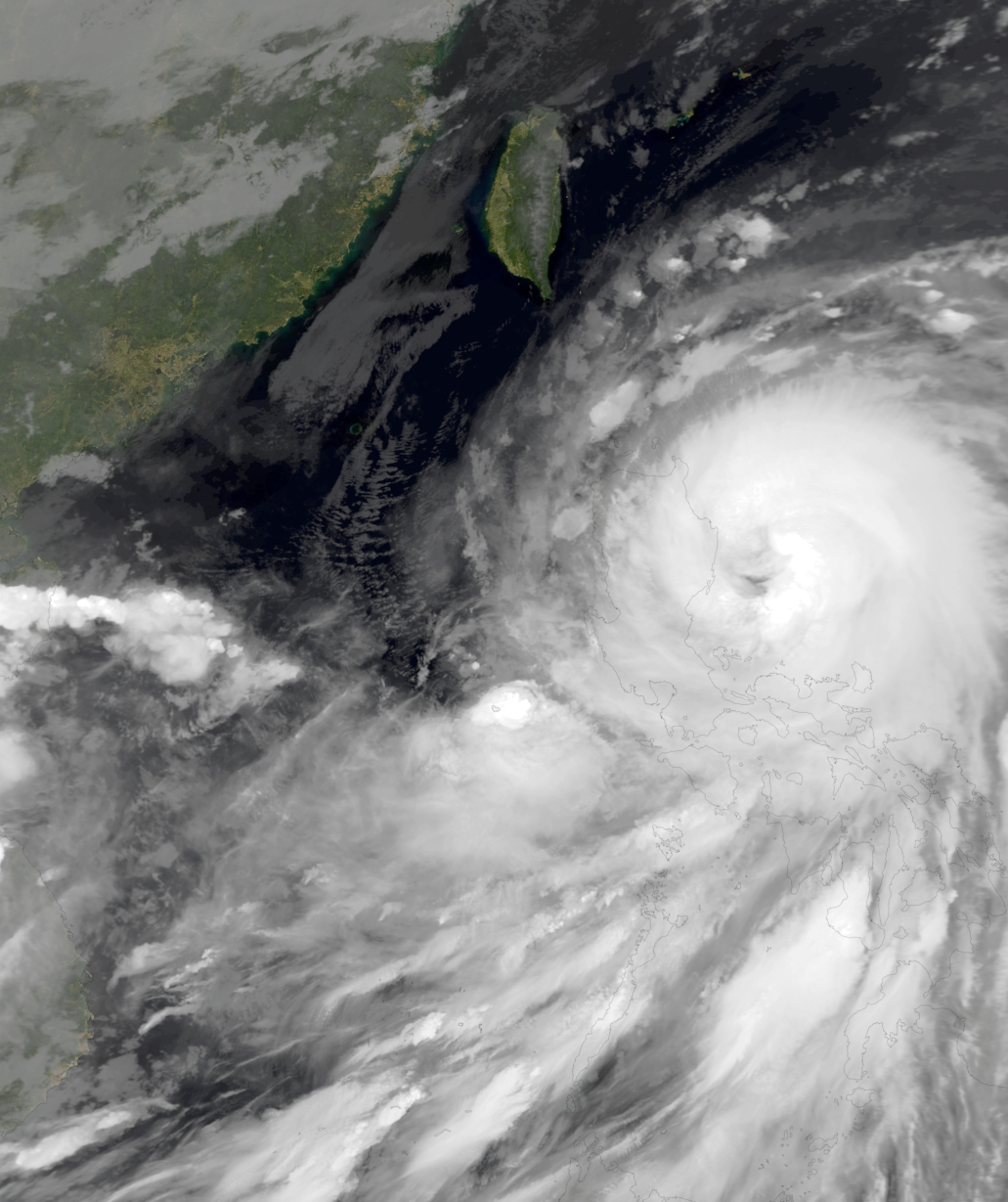
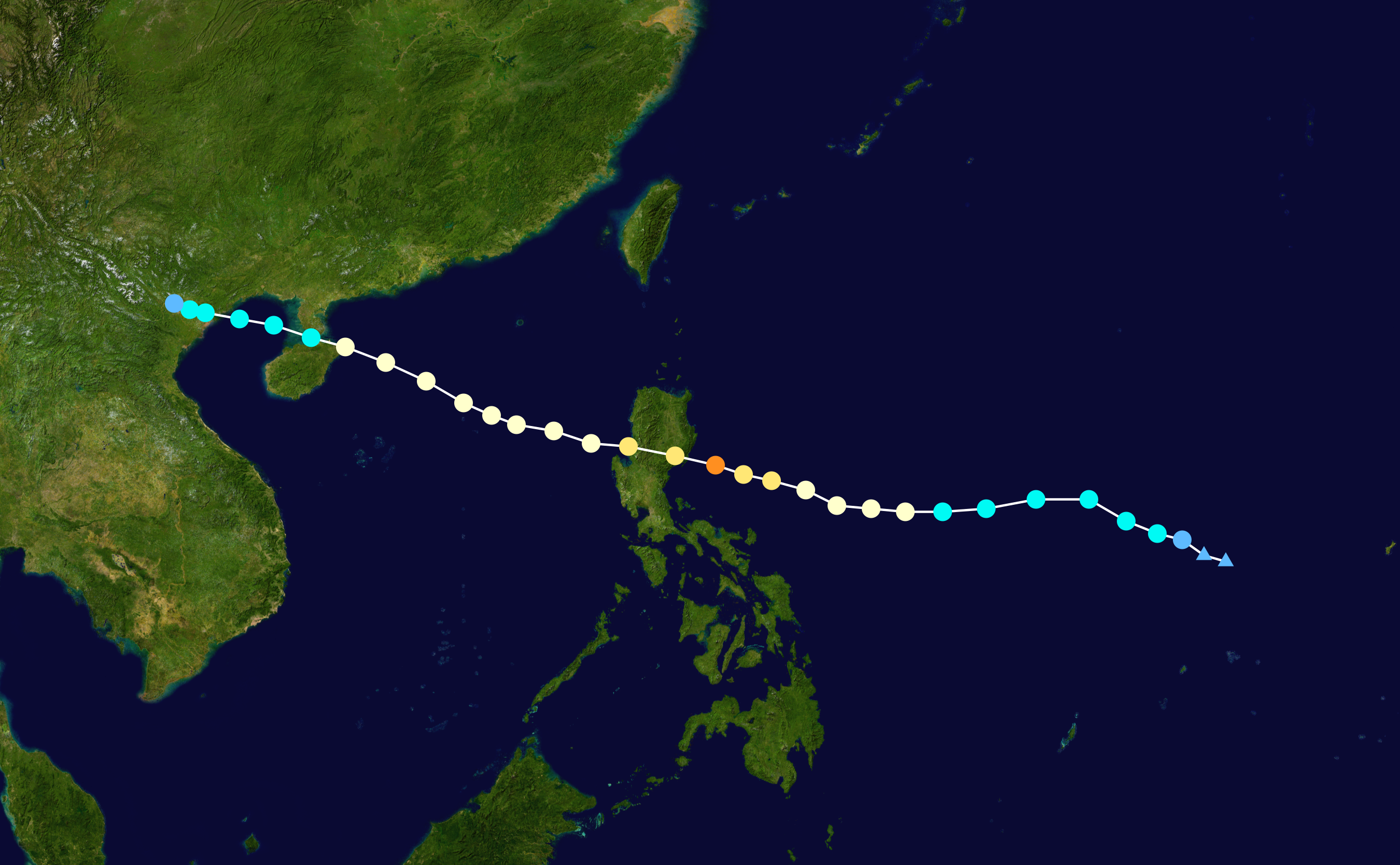
- Duration: September 23 – September 30
- Peak intensity: 150 km/h (90 mph) (10-min); 950 hPa (mbar)

On September 23, both the JMA and the JTWC reported that Tropical Depression 20W, had developed about 610 km (380 mi) to the southwest of Hagåtña, Guam. Early on September 24, the JMA further upgraded 20W to a tropical storm and named it Nesat. Nesat continued to drift west with expanding deep convection around the entire system and consolidating convection around the LLCC. The mid-level warm anomaly near the system continued to intensify and convective banding near the LLCC became more and more tighter. As a result, the JMA upgraded Nesat to a severe tropical storm on September 25. Late on the same day, the JMA further upgraded Nesat to a typhoon. The system rapidly deepened and quickly developed a 30 nautical miles (56 km; 35 mi) ragged eye and mesoscale anticyclone aloft generating an exceptionally excellent all-around outflow. Also, the system had a highly symmetric radial outflow. The JTWC originally anticipated Nesat to become a category 4 typhoon on the SSHS with winds exceeding 130 knots (240 km/h; 150 mph) (1-min sustained). However, because of a cold anomaly, the system only reached a maximum 1-min sustained wind speed of 115 knots (213 km/h; 132 mph).

Early on September 27, Nesat made landfall over the Luzon region of Philippines. As a result, the eyewall got eroded and the maximum 1-min sustained winds dropped to 95 knots (176 km/h; 109 mph). The system approached land at nearly 10 knots (19 km/h; 12 mph). However, later on that day, the LLCC started to get re-consolidated with convection as Nesat quickly moved west and re-emerged over water. At that time, it was located near the southern periphery of a deep layered subtropical steering ridge and moved towards the southwest and the winds further dropped to 85 knots (157 km/h; 98 mph) because of land interaction. Though the system has maintained overall central deep convection, subsidence persisted along the northwest quadrant which caused further drop in wind speed. Upper level analysis indicated that Nesat was to the south of a ridge axis in an area of moderate vertical wind shear. The system continued to weaken with convective banding loosely wrapped into the partially exposed LLCC. The winds continued to drop and eventually reached 65 knots (120 km/h; 75 mph) (1-min sustained) which made it a minimal typhoon on the SSHS. Though the weakening, Water vapour imagery showed that the typhoon was still maintaining excellent outflow towards the equator and improving outflow towards the pole. Nesat maintained a relatively large area of gale-force winds. Animated infrared satellite imagery depicted that the storm was expanding in size and convective banding continued to move further and further away from the LLCC. The LLCC was also relatively large, elongated and cloud free.

On September 29, by the time Nesat managed to re-develop ad 10 nautical miles (19 km; 12 mi) ragged eye, it made landfall over Wenchang in Hainan, China and started weakening again. Because of the poor shapre and disorganization at the LLCC, the typhoon could only maintain a maximum 1-min sustained windspeed of 65 knots (120 km/h; 75 mph). Even after the landfall, Nesat maintained vigorous convection all around the LLCC and did not weaken too much when compared to the reactions after the Philippine landfall. There was a sea-surface temperature of approximately 28 °C (82 °F) and a slight vertical wind shear of 10 knots (19 km/h; 12 mph) near the system's center at that time. The JTWC anticipated the storm to gradually drift over the Gulf of Tonkin and make landfall over Vietnam with a 1-min sustained wind speed of at-least 50 knots (93 km/h; 58 mph). Early on September 30, Nesat made its final landfall over northern Vietnam with a 1-mim sustained windspeed of 55 knots (102 km/h; 63 mph) and a well-defined, tightly wrapped LLCC, and soon it started weakening. The lowest air pressure recorded in Cô Tô during the typhoon was 981.4 hPa (28.98 inHg). Due to land interaction, the convection around the system started decaying rapidly. Due to the rapid weakening, the JTWC ceased advisories on the storm, soon afterwards. Later that evening, the JMA downgraded Nesat to a tropical low over land and issued their final warning on the system.

The residents of Manila had nothing to do but wading through waist-deep floodwaters, dodging branches and flying debris as the typhoon sent surging waves as tall as palm trees over seawalls completely submerging neighborhoods. By the evening of September 27, at-least 7 people were reported to be killed and most of them in metropolitan Manila, a place already battered by heavy monsoonal rains. Similar to the Tulane University during Hurricane Katrina, the Manila Hospital moved patients from its ground floor which was flooded with neck-deep waters. Hospital generators were flooded and the building had no power since the typhoon arrived. Soldiers and police in trucks moved thousands of residents, most importantly the women and the children away from the Baseco shanty after many houses were washed away in the storm surge and floodwaters brought by Nesat. The typhoon made landfall before dawn triggering instant response. Authorities ordered more than a hundred thousand people across the country to flee from Typhoon Nesat's rains and wind gusts. Several schools and offices were shut and thousands were stranded after flight and ferry services were completely disrupted by the fierce storm. Nearly thirty-seven percent of Manila Electric Company's service area was left without power after high winds and heavy rains toppled power lines. Also, in Malabon, Navotas and Valenzuela the Manila Electric power company shut down power to prevent any accidents.

During the period when Nesat affected Vietnam, the highest sustained wind speed recorded on land was 90 km/h (56 mph) at Cửa Ông (Quảng Ninh).

During late 2011, the JTWC instead upgraded Nesat from a category 3 to a category 4 typhoon as a post-analysis.

=== Tropical Storm Haitang ===
- Tropical storm (JMA)
- Tropical storm (SSHWS)
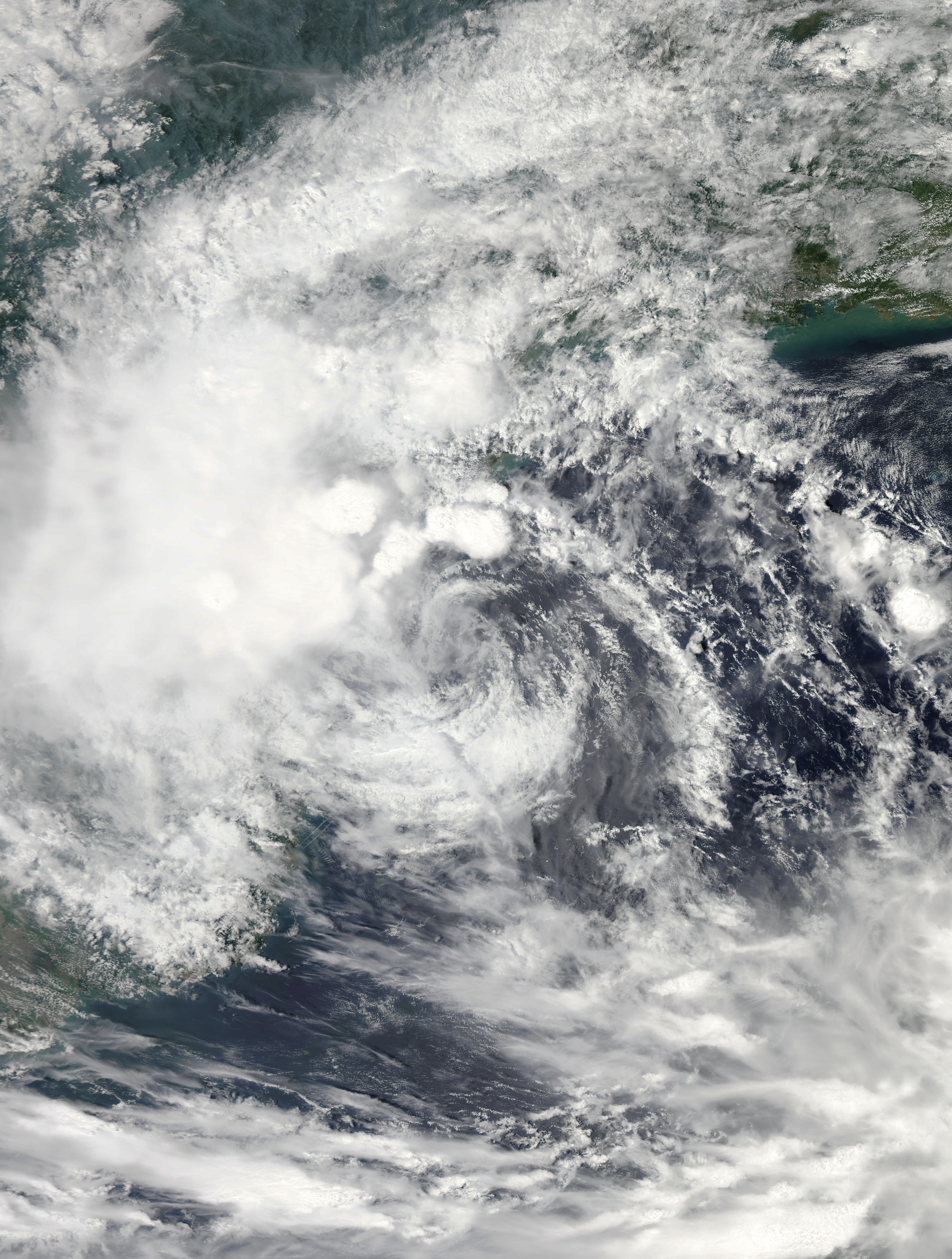
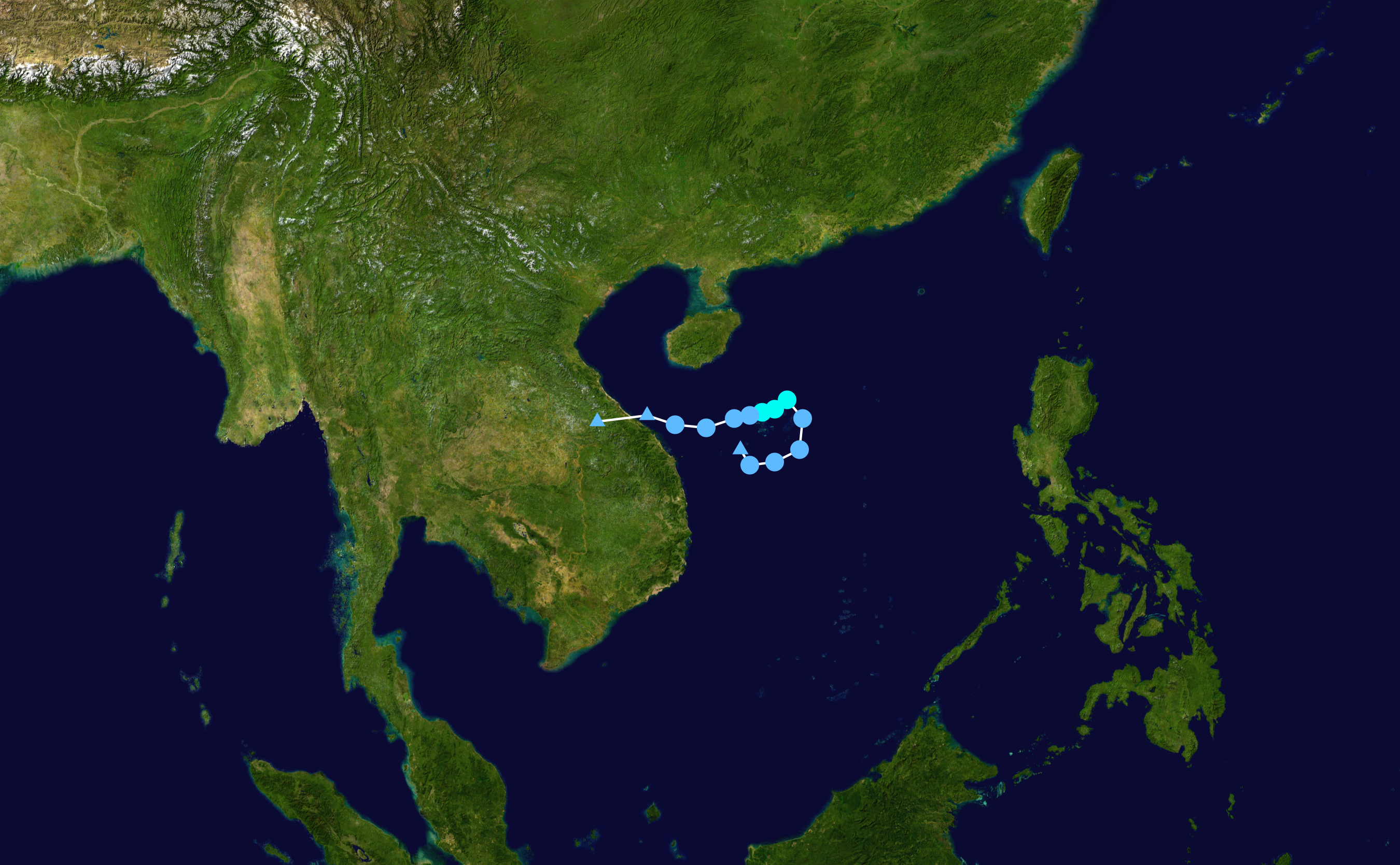
- Duration: September 24 – September 27
- Peak intensity: 65 km/h (40 mph) (10-min); 996 hPa (mbar)

On the evening of September 21, at almost the same time when Nesat was first seen, another low-pressure area persisted far south of Hong Kong. The low slowly drifted north and strengthened slowly until September 24, when the JMA upgraded the system to a tropical depression east of Vietnam. Later that day, the JTWC issued a Tropical Cyclone Formation Alert stating that the low could develop into a tropical cyclone. Only a few hours later, the JTWC initiated advisories on the system, designating it with 21W. Early the next day, the storm strengthened significantly that the JMA upgraded it to a tropical storm, naming it Haitang. Later that day, the storm developed a better organized; however, the system's low-level circulation center (LLCC) became fully exposed due to moderate vertical wind shear from the nearby system, Typhoon Nesat, which also caused the storm to remain very weak with winds of 35 knots (65 km/h; 40 mph). By that night, wind shear from Nesat, which was moving closer towards Haitang, strengthened and pushed all the convection to the west-southwest keeping the storm relatively weak. Though a ridge building over China impinged poleward outflow, the euquatoward outflow remained significantly excellent. Haitang was also a slow-mover, moving westward at only 3 knots (5.6 km/h; 3.5 mph). However, by the night of September 26, Haitang rapidly accelerated west at over 13 knots (24 km/h; 15 mph) and made landfall over Vietnam. Though there was a burst of convection at that time, both land interaction and vertical wind shear weakened the system into a tropical depression and the JTWC ceased their advisories. The JMA tracked Haitang as a tropical depression until it finally dissipated inland Vietnam early on September 27.

=== Typhoon Nalgae (Quiel) ===
- Very strong typhoon (JMA)
- Category 4 super typhoon (SSHWS)
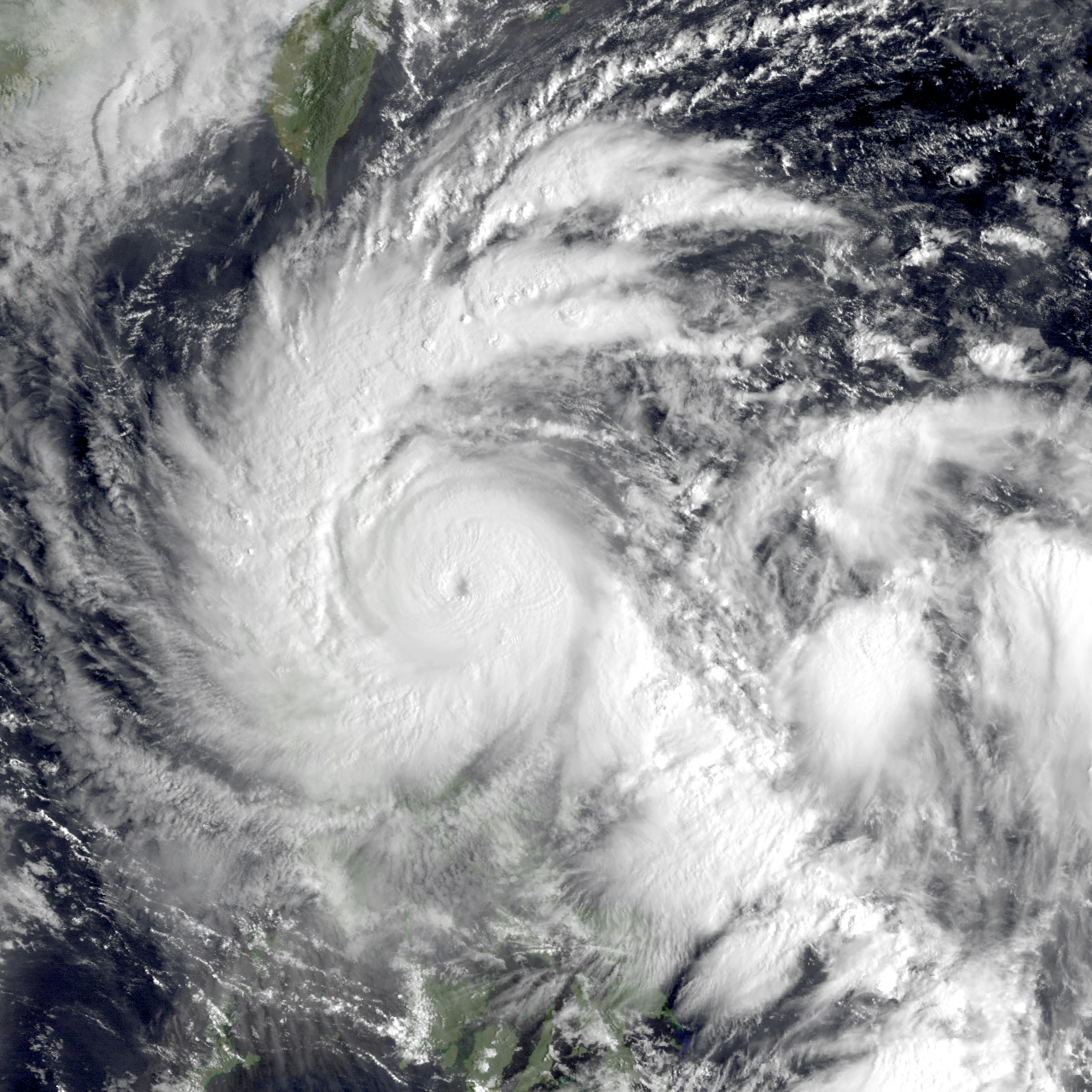
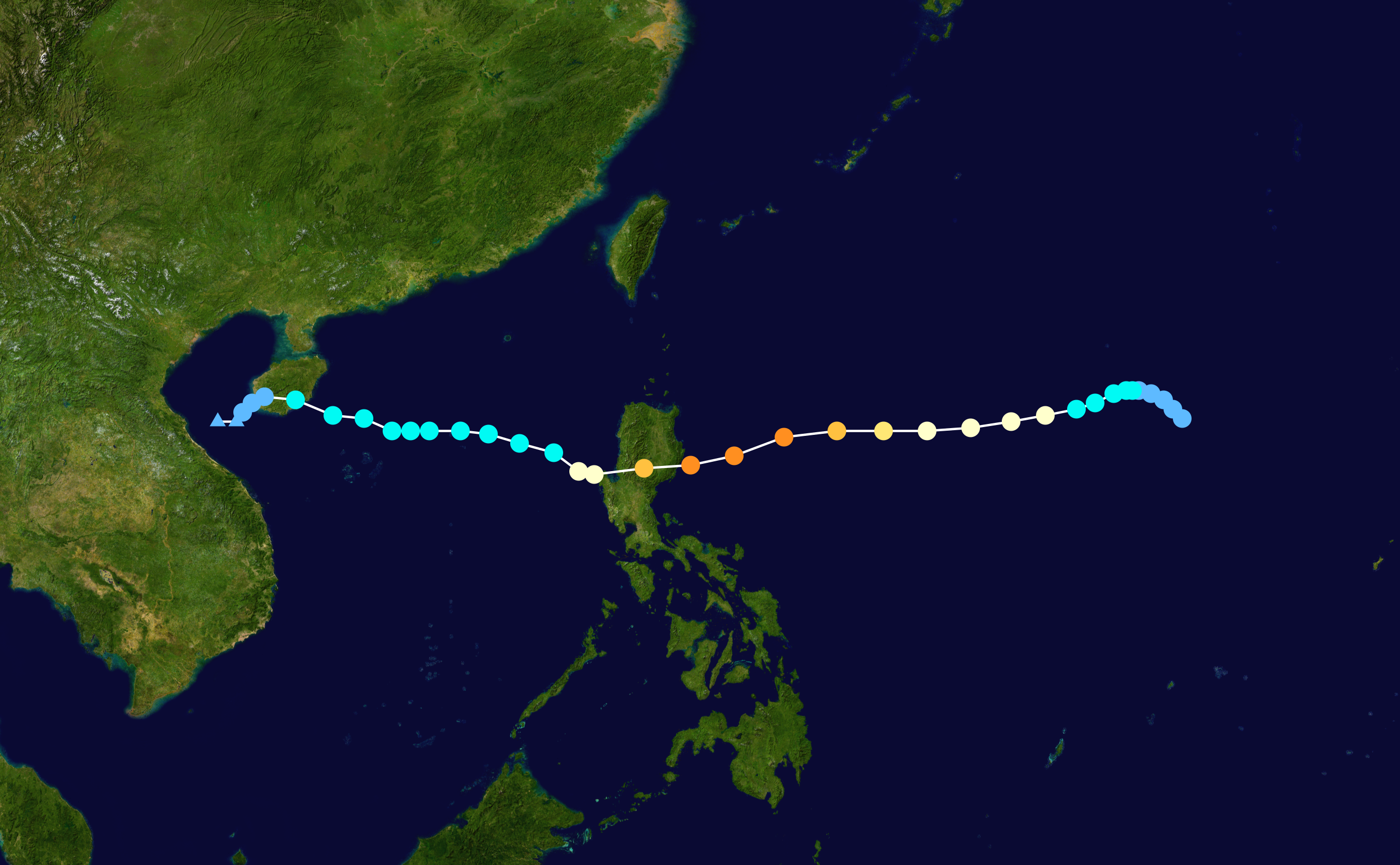
- Duration: September 26 – October 5
- Peak intensity: 175 km/h (110 mph) (10-min); 935 hPa (mbar)

On September 26, the Japan Meteorological Agency (JMA) started to monitor a weak tropical depression that had developed about 1,260 km (785 mi) to the northwest of Manila in the Philippines. During that day, while the depression moved towards the northwest its low level circulation centre rapidly consolidated in an area of favourable conditions for further development of the system. This prompted the JTWC to issue a Tropical Cyclone Formation Alert on the system early the next day. However less than 3 hours later, the JTWC decided to issue advisories on the system designating it as Tropical Depression 22W, before the JMA reported that the depression had become a tropical storm and named it Nalgae.

The storm slowly drifted to the west and kept on intensifying gradually. Nalgae developed a microwave eye like feature and well defined convective banding in all the quadrants. The system had a tiny radius of winds, though it was still strengthening significantly and was very well defined. On the evening of September 28, the JMA reported that Nalgae continued to intensify, as they upgraded it to a severe tropical storm with winds of over 55 knots (102 km/h; 63 mph). On that night, the PAGASA initiated advisories on Nalgae, giving it the local name Quiel, as it entered the Philippine Area of Responsibility (PAR). Late on September 29, the JMA upgraded Nalgae to a typhoon. Nalgae rapidly intensified on September 30, and attained category 4 super typhoon status early on October 1, just before making landfall over Luzon. Due to land interaction and colder sea surface temperature in the South China Sea, the JMA downgraded Nalgae to a severe tropical storm on October 2, and then a tropical storm late on October 3. The JTWC downgraded Nalgae to a tropical depression on October 4, and the JMA also did it on the next day. Later on October 5, the remnant low of Nalgae dissipated.

Striking the Philippines just days after Typhoon Nesat, Nalgae caused further damage across Luzon. Although first feared that Nalgae would cause much more damage to Luzon, which was severely affected by Typhoon Nesat, damage from the storm was not as anticipated to be lighter than Typhoon Nesat, which ironically is much weaker than Nalgae, but high winds and heavy rains from the storm caused widespread power outages and flooding that left many communities isolated. Nearly 2,900 homes were destroyed and approximately another 15,400 sustained damage. At least 18 people were killed by the storm and another 7 were reported as missing as of October 11. A total of 1,113,763 people were affected by the storm. Total losses in the country reached just over ₱115 million ($2.62 million).

=== Tropical Storm Banyan (Ramon) ===
- Tropical storm (JMA)
- Tropical depression (SSHWS)
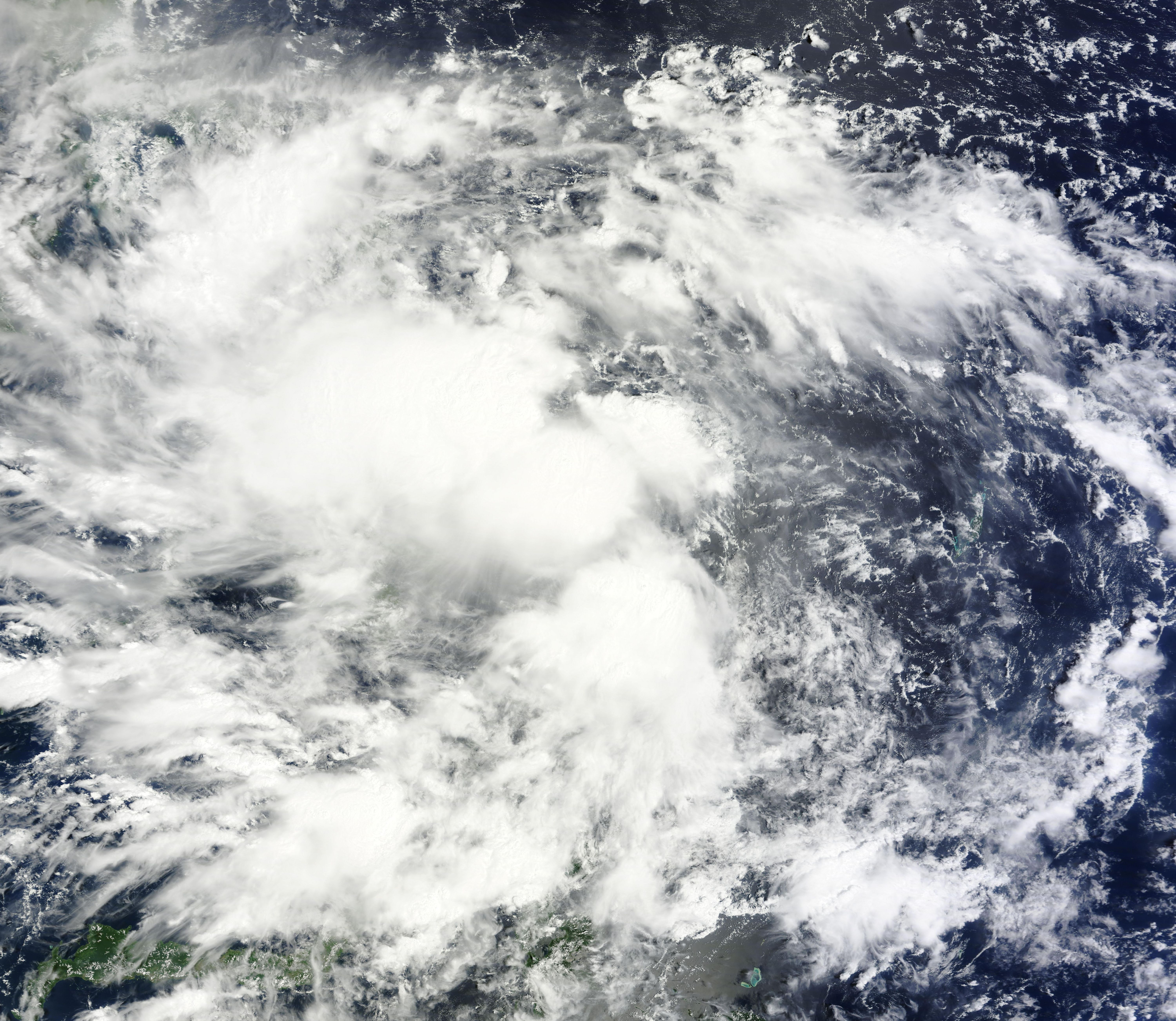
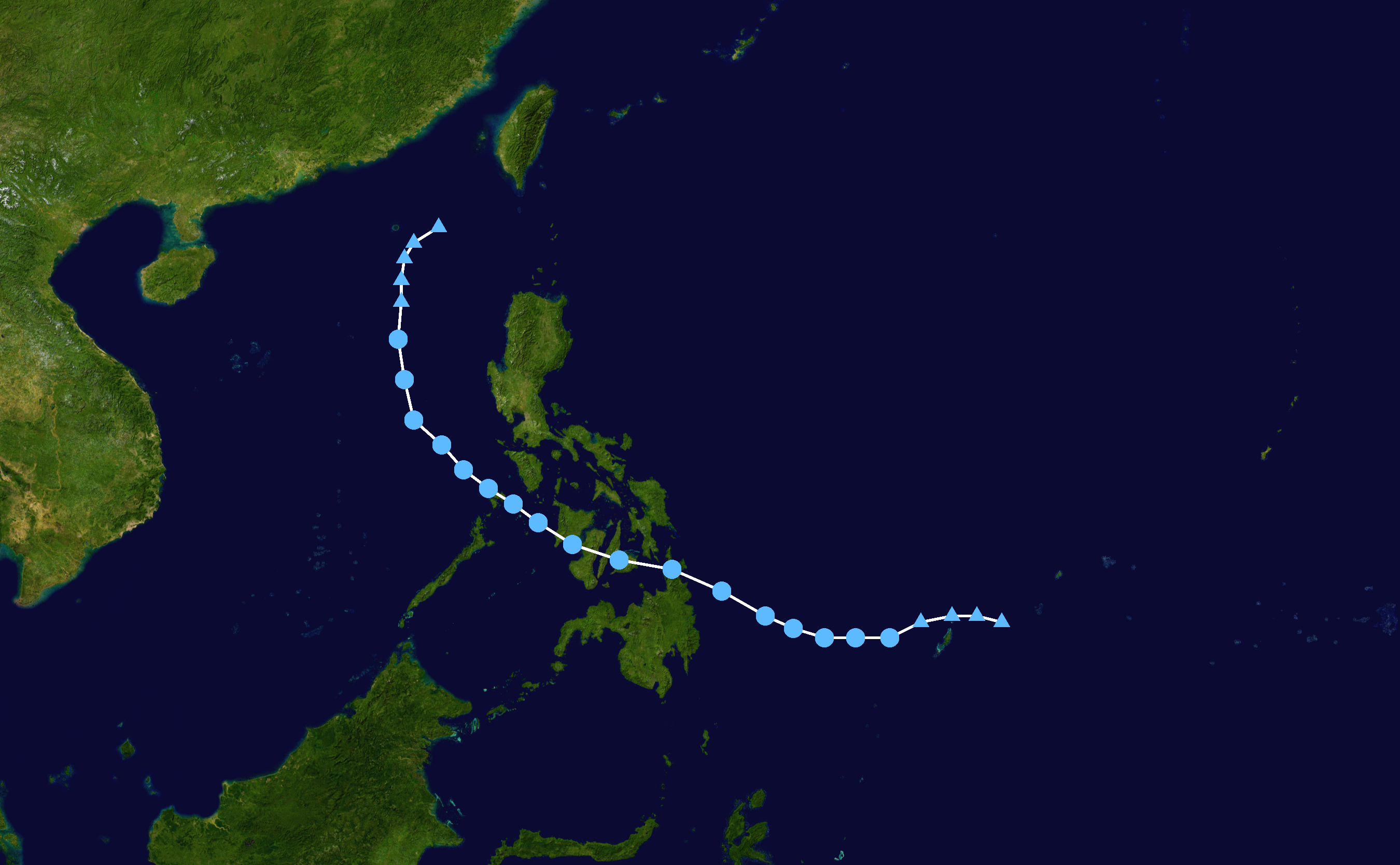
- Duration: October 9 – October 14
- Peak intensity: 65 km/h (40 mph) (10-min); 1002 hPa (mbar)

On October 7, the JTWC started monitoring a tropical disturbance that had developed in an area of low vertical windshear, about 750 km (470 mi) to the south of Hagåtña, Guam. Over the next couple of days the system gradually developed further while moving towards the west, before the JMA reported on October 9, that the disturbance had developed into a tropical depression. Early on October 10, the JTWC upgraded the system to a tropical depression designating as 23W, and the PAGASA also upgraded it to a tropical depression and named it Ramon. On October 11, the JMA and the JTWC upgraded the system to a tropical storm and named it Banyan. Early on October 12, Banyan made landfall over Leyte, Philippines, and the JTWC downgraded it to a tropical depression. A half day later, the JMA also downgraded Banyan to a tropical depression. The system dissipated in the South China Sea, on October 16,.

While tracking through the Philippines, Banyan produced heavy rains across much of the country, leading to widespread flooding. At least ten people were killed by the storm and another was reported missing. A total of 75,632 people were affected by the storm.

=== Tropical Depression 24W ===
- Tropical depression (JMA)
- Tropical depression (SSHWS)
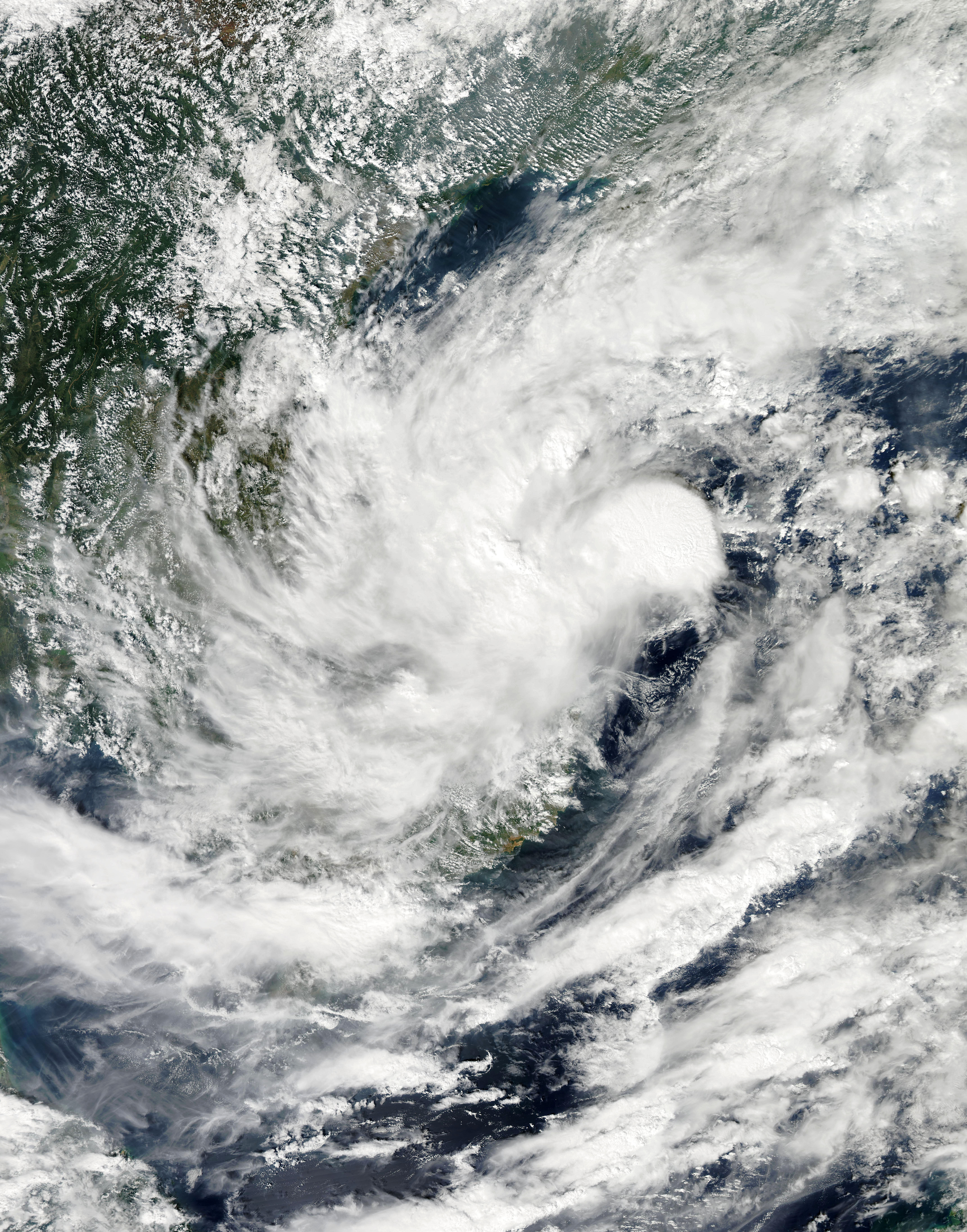
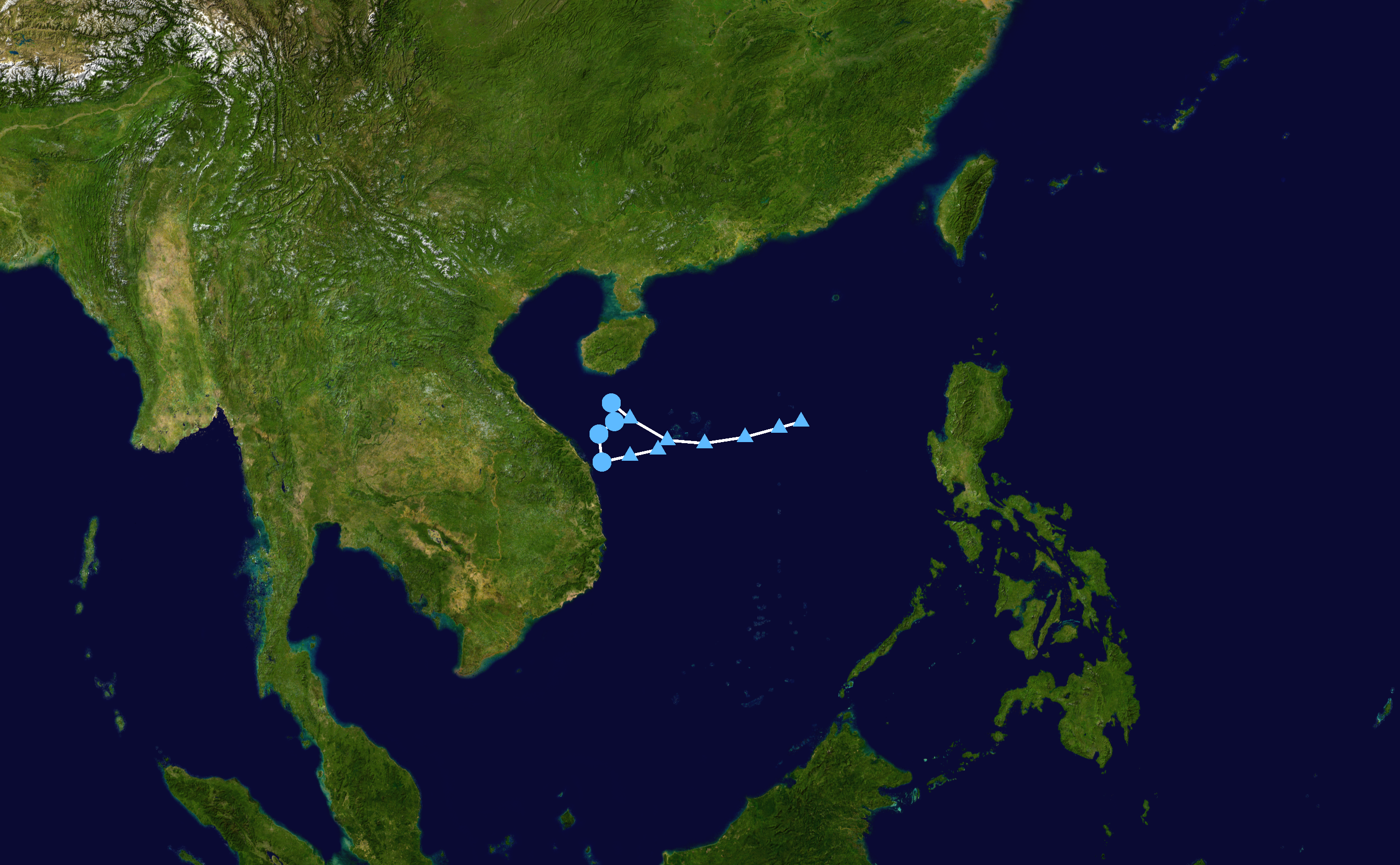
- Duration: November 7 – November 8
- Peak intensity: 45 km/h (30 mph) (10-min); 1004 hPa (mbar)

On November 5, the JTWC started to monitor a tropical disturbance that had developed within an area of low vertical windshear, about 640 km (400 mi) to the east-southeast of Ho Chi Minh City in Vietnam. Over the next couple of days the disturbance moved towards the north-northwest as atmospheric convection surrounding the system wrapped into the disturbances developing low-level circulation center. During November 7, the JMA and the JTWC reported that the disturbance had become a tropical depression and started to warn on it with the latter designating it as Tropical Depression 24W.

=== Tropical Depression 25W ===
- Tropical depression (SSHWS)
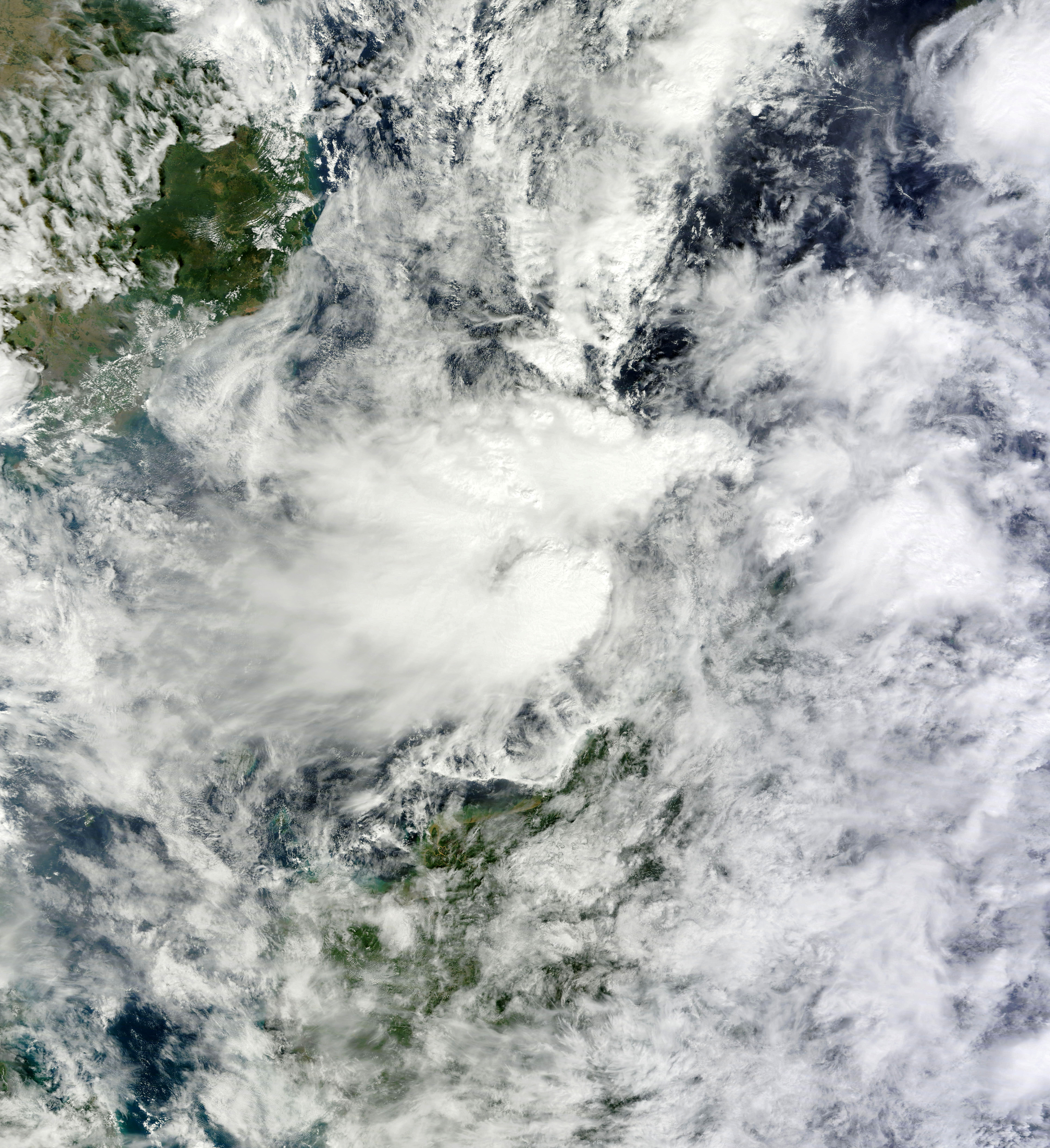
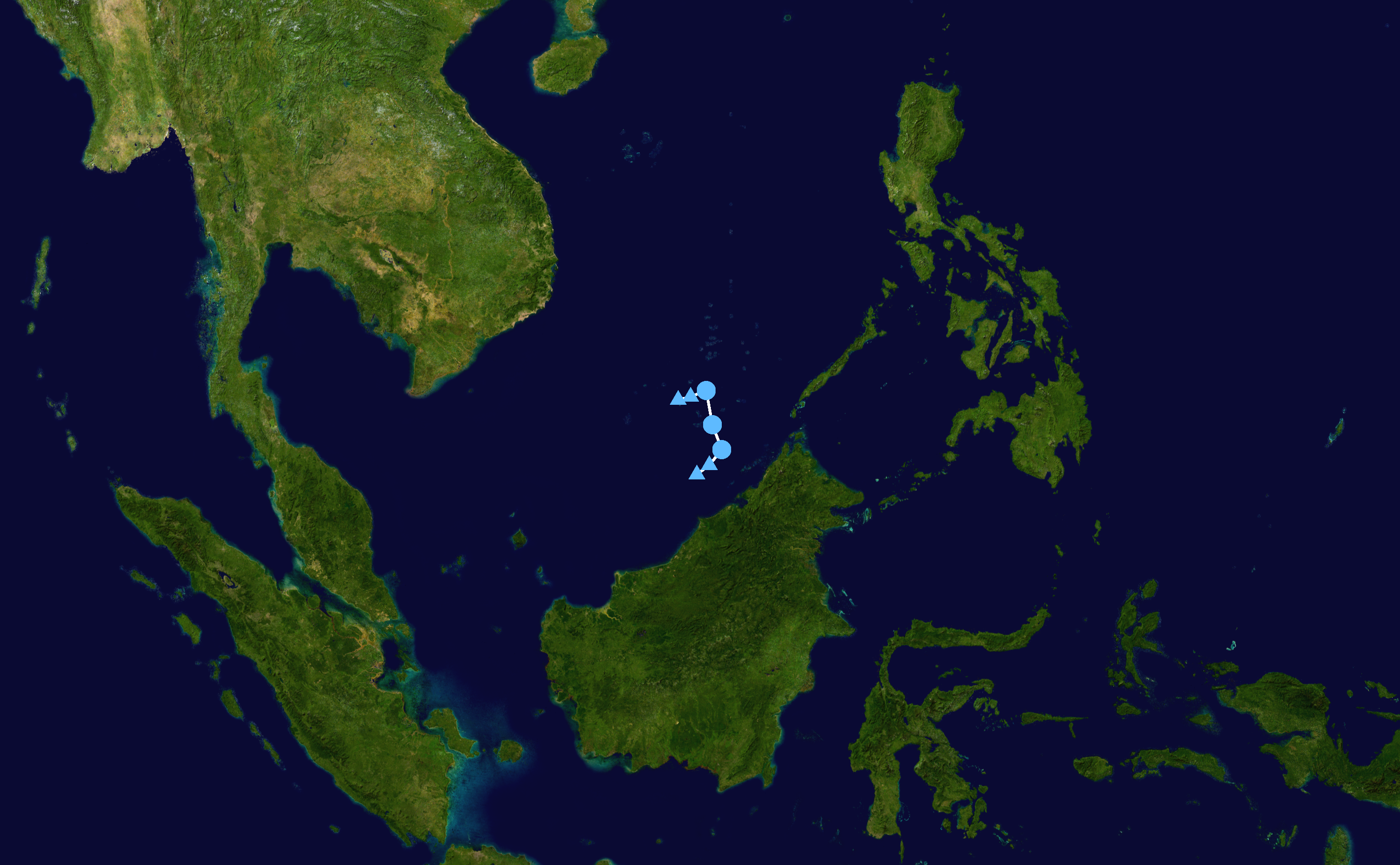
- Duration: December 3 – December 5
- Peak intensity: 45 km/h (30 mph) (1-min); 1006 hPa (mbar)

During December 3, the JTWC started to monitor a tropical disturbance, that had developed within an area of moderate vertical windshear, about 180 km (110 mi) to the northwest of Bandar Seri Begawan, Brunei. During that day deep atmospheric convection surrounding the system built over the disturbances low level circulation, before the JTWC reported during the next day, that the disturbance had developed into a tropical cyclone and designated it as Tropical Depression 25W. Despite being predicted to intensify into a tropical storm after being designated, the depression moved towards the northwest and rapidly deteriorated as it interacted with the cold and dry north-easterlies, as a result the JTWC issued their final warning on the system early on December 5.

=== Tropical Depression 26W ===
- Tropical depression (JMA)
- Tropical depression (SSHWS)
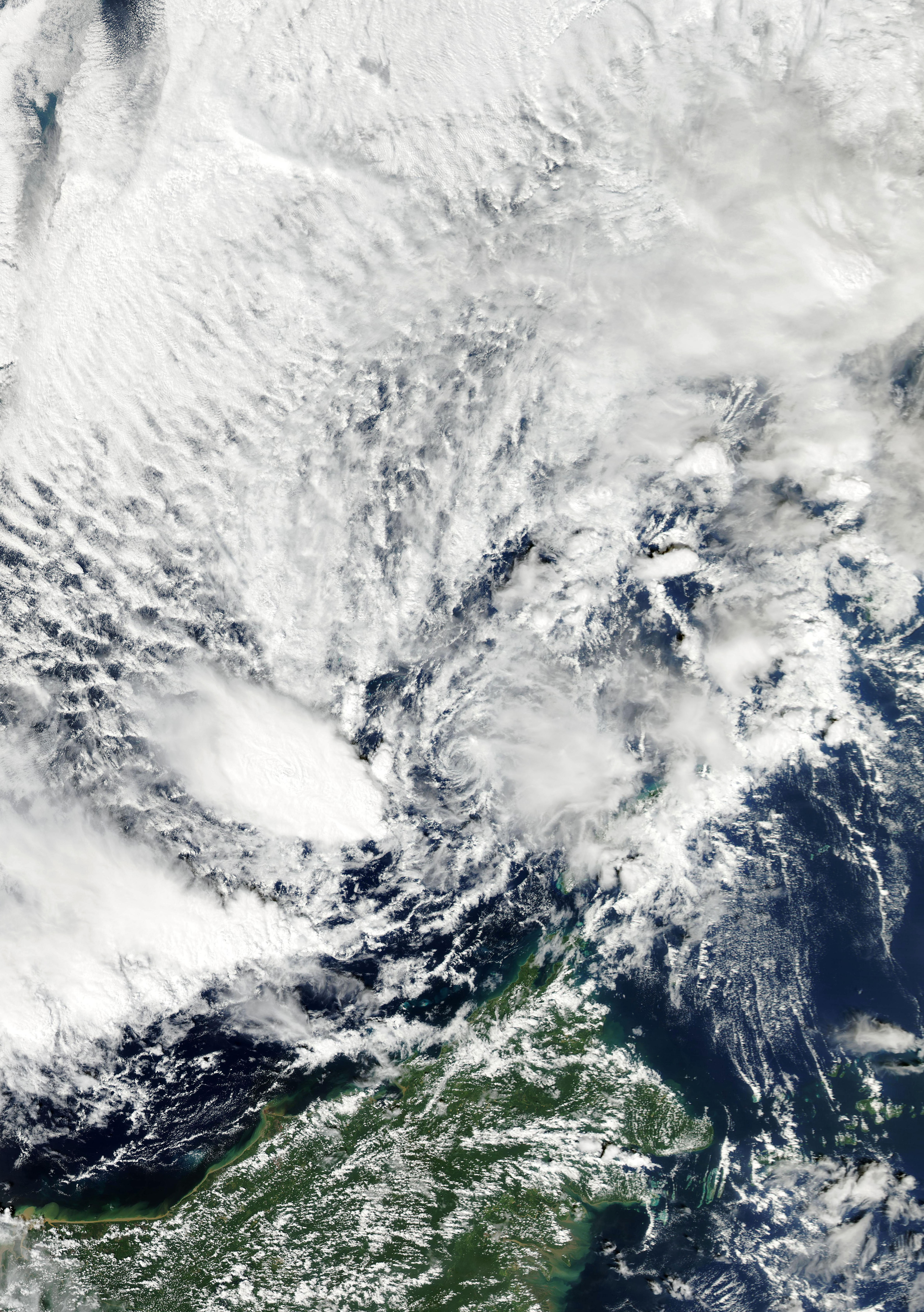
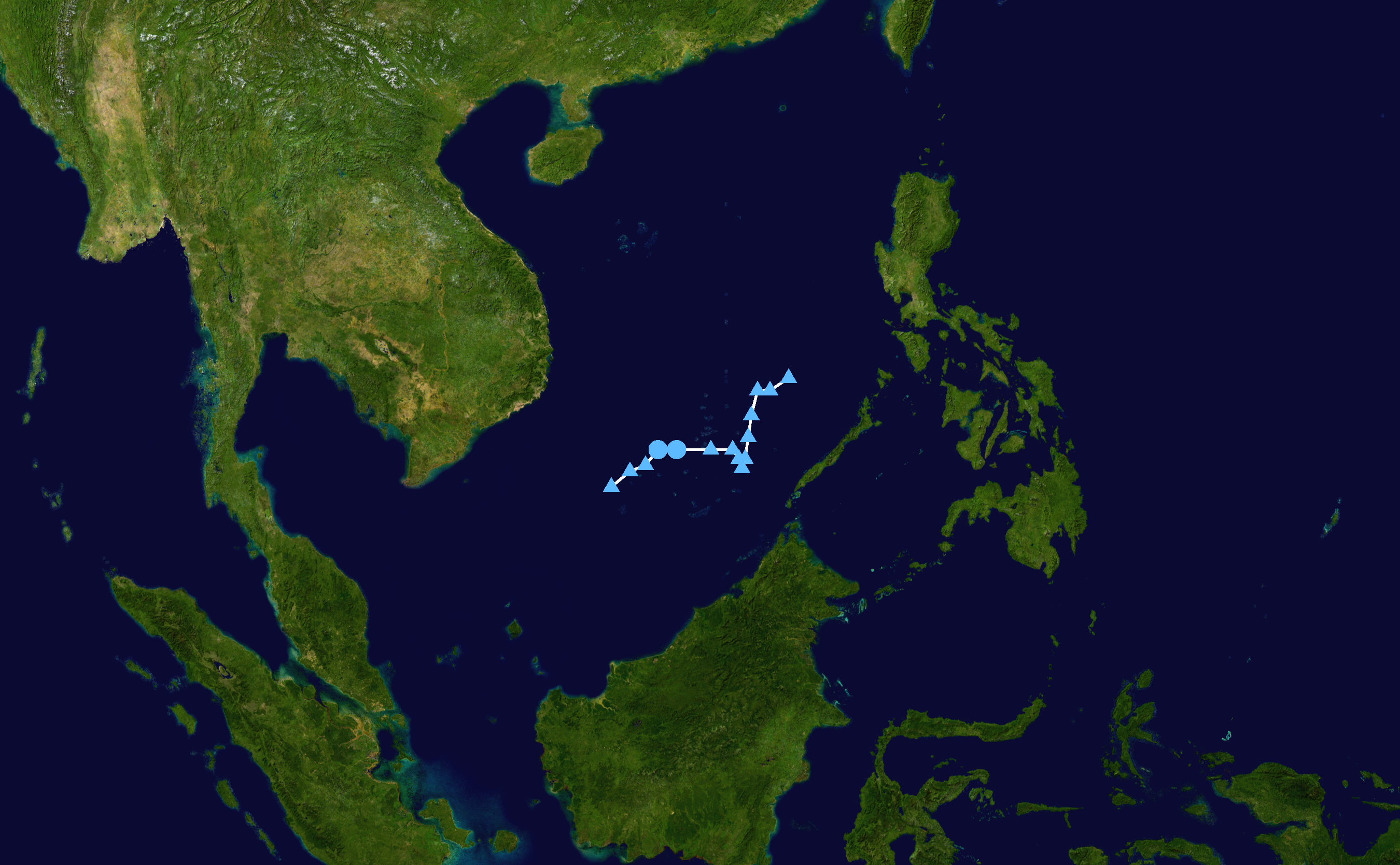
- Duration: December 10 – December 14
- Peak intensity: 55 km/h (35 mph) (10-min); 1004 hPa (mbar)

On December 9, the JTWC started to monitor a tropical disturbance that had developed about 550 km (340 mi) to the south-southeast of Manila on Luzon Island. On December 11, the JTWC cancelled the TCFA on the disturbance due to the interaction with the cold air coming from the north. The tropical depression reached peak intensity during midday, on December 11, as it was located over the center, of the South China Sea. But later that day, the depression began to weaken rapidly, as the storm moved southeastward. However, the JTWC issued a TCFA on the disturbance again early on December 12, because of a decrease in vertical wind shear. After a few hours, the JTWC upgraded it to a tropical depression and designated as 26W. After a couple of days drifting southwestwards in the South China Sea, on December 13, the JTWC issued their final advisories on the system as it started to weaken. Late on December 14, the tropical depression dissipated near Borneo.

=== Severe Tropical Storm Washi (Sendong) ===
- Severe tropical storm (JMA)
- Tropical storm (SSHWS)
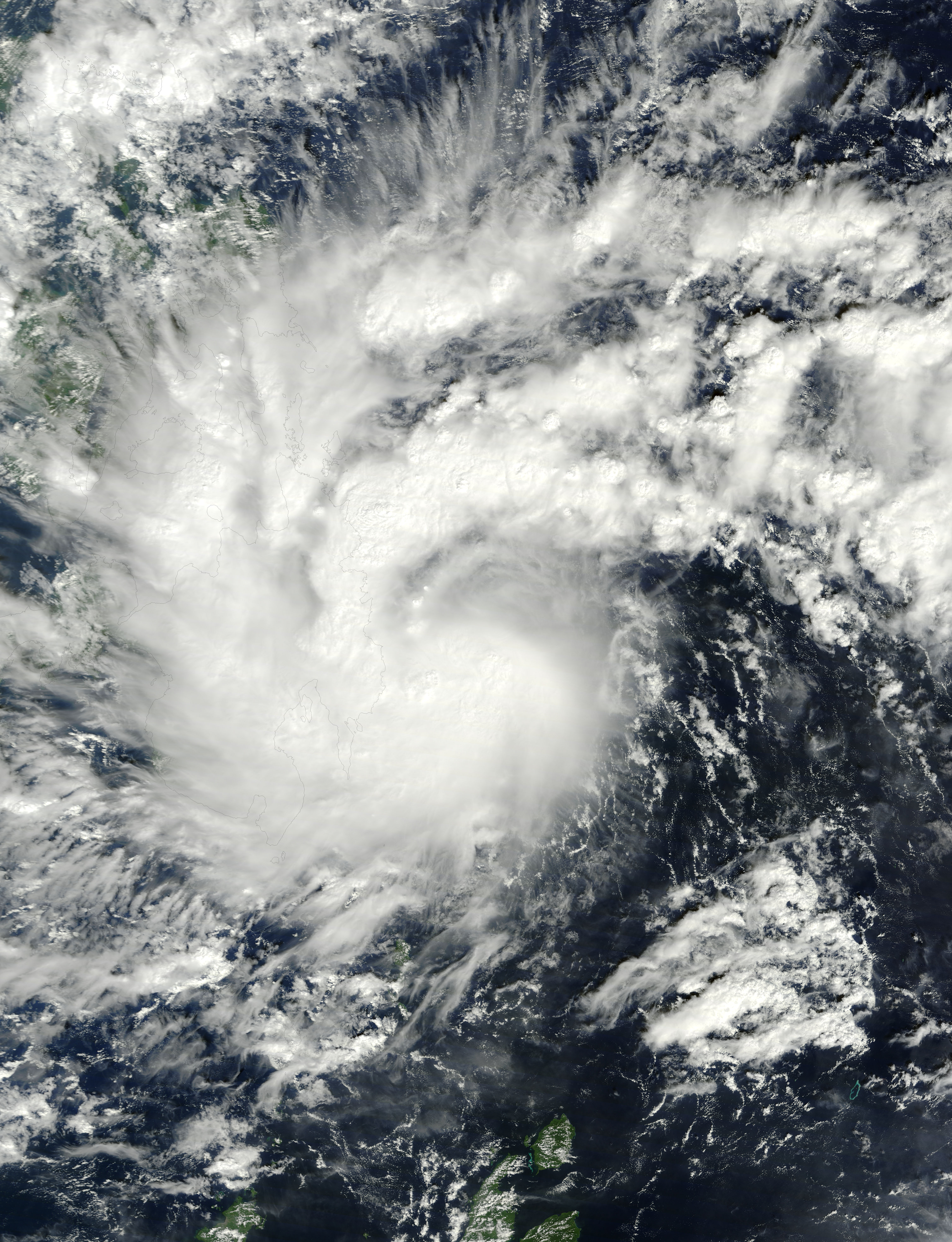
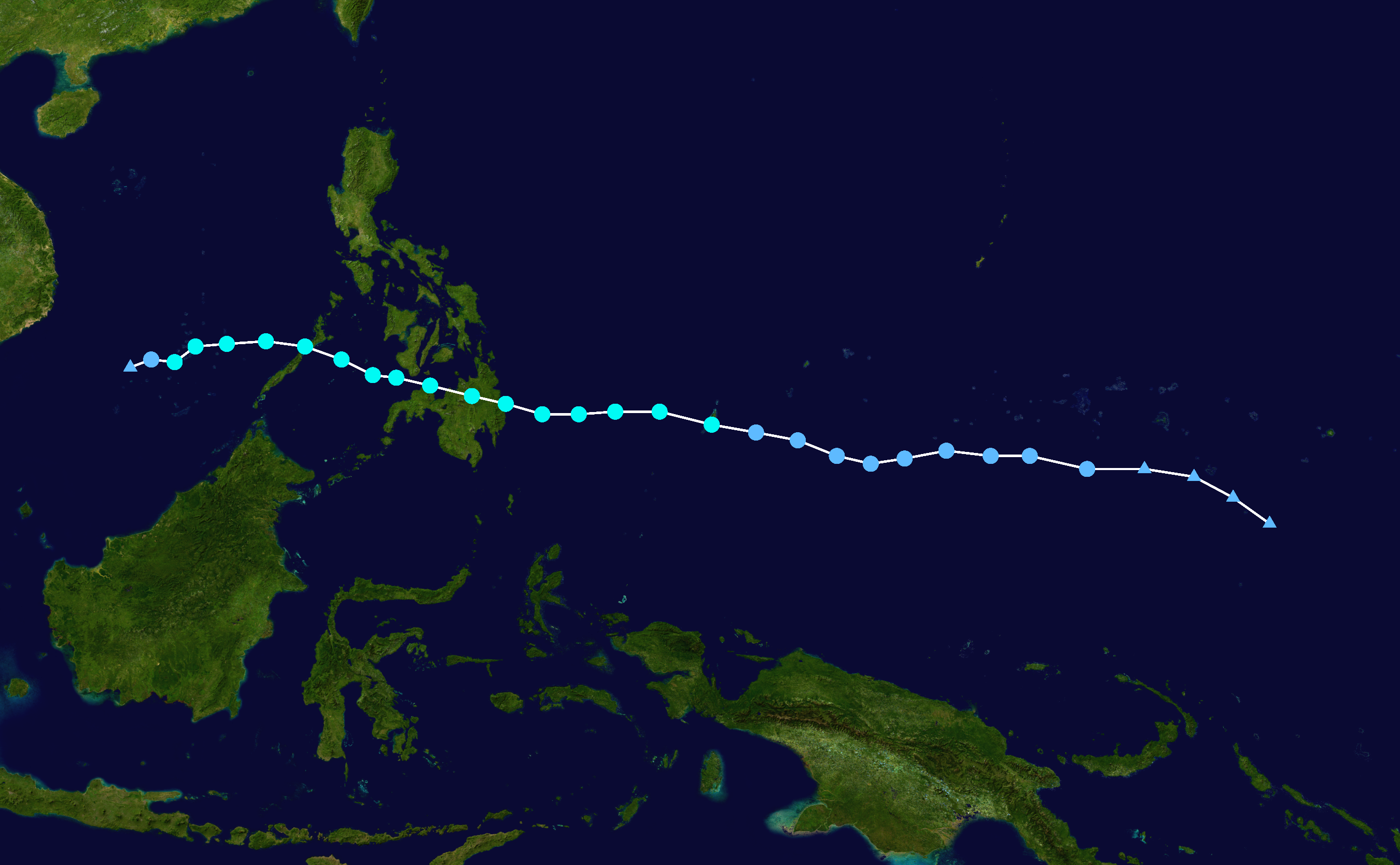
- Duration: December 13 – December 19
- Peak intensity: 95 km/h (60 mph) (10-min); 992 hPa (mbar)

On December 11, a disturbance formed and persisted near Chuuk. On December 13, the low-pressure area rapidly intensified prompting the JTWC to issue a TCFA. On the same day, the JTWC upgraded the low pressure to a tropical depression and designated as 27W; in addition, the JMA also upgraded it to a tropical depression. The JTWC upgraded the system to a tropical storm on December 14, but downgraded it to a tropical depression early on December 15, and the PAGASA designated it Sendong as it entered the Philippine Area of Responsibility. After passing Palau on December 15, both the JTWC and the JMA upgraded the system to a tropical storm and named it Washi. On December 16, Washi made landfall over Surigao del Sur, a province of the Philippines located in Mindanao. Several hours later, Washi arrived at the Sulu Sea and regained its strength quickly, due to slight land interaction with Mindanao. Late on December 17, Washi crossed Palawan, and arrived at the South China Sea. On December 19, Washi weakened into a tropical depression and dissipated.

In the Philippines, Washi has caused at least 1,268 fatalities, and 1,079 people are officially listed as missing. Washi had affected 102,899 families or 674,472 people in 766 villages in 52 towns and eight cities in 13 provinces. The majority of the deaths were in the cities of Iligan and Cagayan de Oro. Five people were killed in a landslide, but all others died in flash flooding. More than 2,000 have been rescued, according to the Armed Forces of the Philippines. Officials were also investigating reports that an entire village was swept away. The flash flooding occurred overnight, following 10 hours of rain, compounded by overflowing rivers and tributaries. In some areas, up to 20 centimeters of rain fell in 24 hours. At least 20,000 people were staying in 10 evacuation centers in Cagayan de Oro. Officials said that despite government warning, some people did not evacuate. At least 9,433 houses were destroyed while 18,616 were damaged.

=== Other systems ===
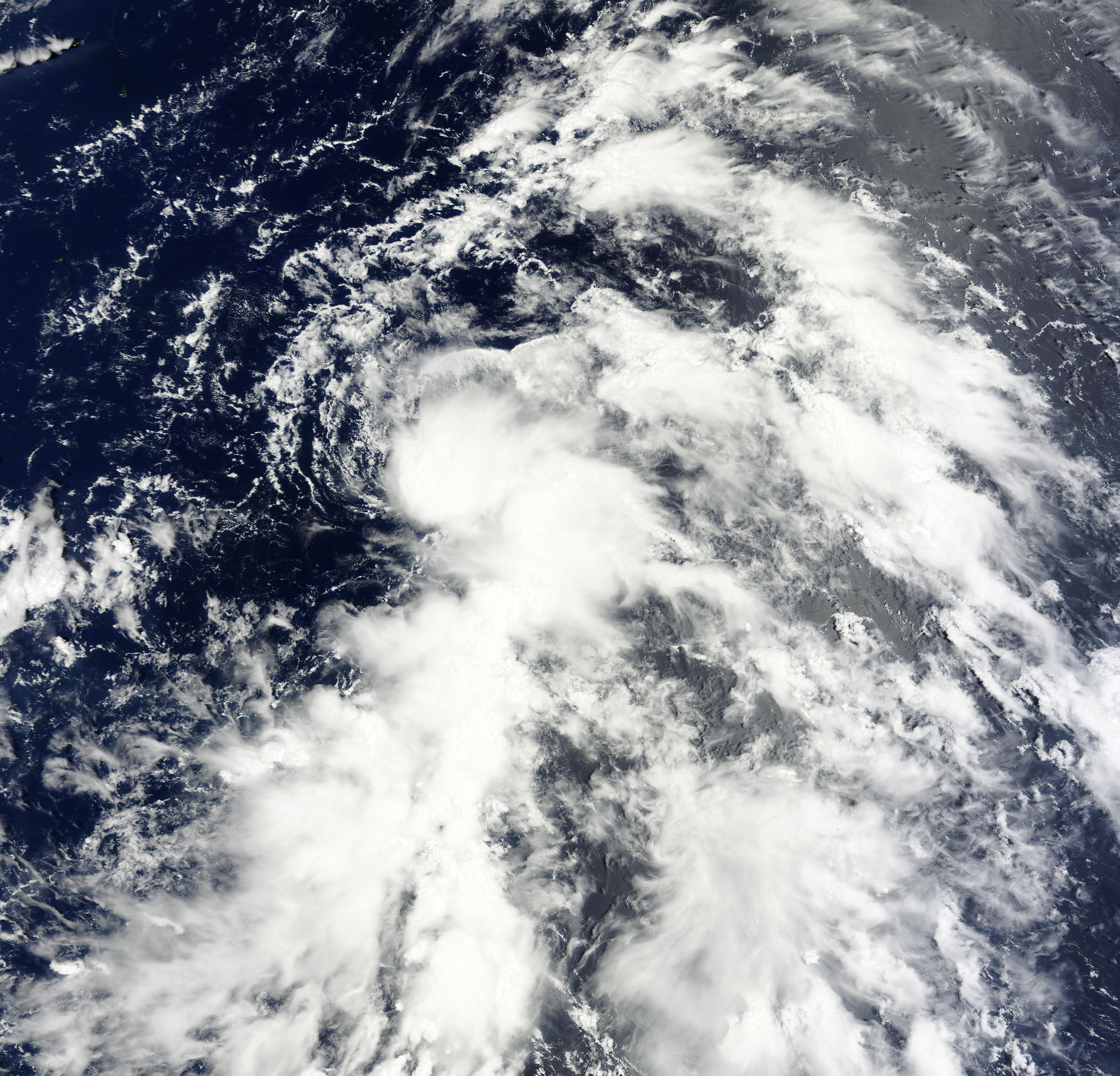
A developing tropical depression on August 20, which failed to be a tropical storm in its lifecycle

The following weak tropical depressions were also monitored by one or more of the warning centers, however they were either short lived or did not significantly develop further. On May 31, the JMA reported that a tropical depression had developed at the southern end of a shear line, about 420 km (260 mi) to the southeast of Hong Kong, China. During that day as the depression moved towards the north-northeast, a trough of low pressure located over Hainan island and dry cold air wrapping into the depression's circulation inhibited further development of the depression. The depression then degenerated into an area of low pressure during the next day, before it dissipated during June 2. On June 14, the JMA reported that a tropical depression had developed within an area of moderate vertical windshear, about 475 mi (764 km) to the southwest of Manila, Philippines. During that day the depression moved to the north-northwest, before the system dissipated during the next day. On July 16, the JMA reported that a tropical depression had developed about 225 km (140 mi) to the east of Hanoi in northern Vietnam, however it quickly weakened after interacting with land. In the morning of July 16, the Japan Meteorological Agency located in an area of low pressure on the land was upgraded to a tropical depression later on the same day. On July 17, the JMA downgraded the tropical depression to a low pressure. The Hong Kong Observatory only classified the tropical depression as a trough of low pressure is not to be ignored, while the Joint Typhoon Warning Center nor recognize this as a tropical disturbance. On August 19, a low-pressure area developed east-northeast of Guam. Early on August 20, the system developed a broad area of low level circulation center and a good divergence aloft becoming more well defined. Later that day, the JMA upgraded the system to a tropical depression southeast of the Bonin Islands. On August 22, the system started interacting with an anticyclone and was exposed to a strong vertical wind shear, prompting the JMA to stop monitoring the system as a tropical depression, as the system dissipated to a remnant low. However, at midnight, the same day, the remnants regenerated, and the JMA started tracking the system as a tropical depression again, until it last appeared near Okinawa, Japan on August 25, as the system dissipated completely. On September 14, the JMA started to monitor a tropical depression that had developed about 720 km (450 mi) to the southeast of Taipei in Taiwan. During that day, the depression remained near stationary, before becoming stationary, the JMA then last noted the depression late on September 15, as it was absorbed by Typhoon Roke.

On October 11, the JMA reported that a tropical depression had developed to the southeast of Hainan Island. Late on October 13, the system dissipated, just after making landfall over Vietnam. On December 24, the JMA reported that a tropical depression had developed about 1,768 km (1,099 mi) to the southeast of Manila, in the Philippines. During that day, the depression moved towards the northwest before the JMA issued their final advisory on the system. The final tropical depression of the year then developed on December 31, about 340 km (210 mi) to the northeast of Kuala Lumpur, Malaysia. During that day the system moved slowly towards the northwest before it was last noted early the next day on January 1, 2012.

== Storm names ==
Within the North-western Pacific Ocean, both the Japan Meteorological Agency (JMA) and the Philippine Atmospheric, Geophysical and Astronomical Services Administration assign names to tropical cyclones that develop in the Western Pacific, which can result in a tropical cyclone having two names. The Japan Meteorological Agency's RSMC Tokyo — Typhoon Center assigns international names to tropical cyclones on behalf of the World Meteorological Organization's Typhoon Committee, should they be judged to have 10-minute sustained windspeeds of 65 km/h (40 mph). While the Philippine Atmospheric, Geophysical and Astronomical Services Administration assigns names to tropical cyclones which move into or form as a tropical depression in their area of responsibility located between 135°E and 115°E and between 5°N-25°N even if the cyclone has had an international name assigned to it. The names of significant tropical cyclones are retired, by both PAGASA and the Typhoon Committee. Should the list of names for the Philippine region be exhausted then names will be taken from an auxiliary list of which the first ten are published each season. Unused names are marked in gray.

=== International names ===
During the season 21 tropical storms developed in the Western Pacific and each one was named by the JMA, when the system was judged to have 10-minute sustained windspeeds of 65 km/h (40 mph). The JMA selected the names from a list of 140 names, that had been developed by the 14 members nations and territories of the ESCAP/WMO Typhoon Committee.

Aere	Songda	Sarika	Haima	Meari	Ma-on	Tokage	Nock-ten	Muifa	Merbok	Nanmadol
Talas	Noru	Kulap	Roke	Sonca	Nesat	Haitang	Nalgae	Banyan	Washi	

==== Retirement ====
After the season the ESCAP/WMO Typhoon Committee announced the name Washi was removed from the naming lists, and in February 2012, it was subsequently replaced with Hato for future seasons.

=== Philippines ===
Amang	Bebeng	Chedeng	Dodong	Egay
Falcon	Goring	Hanna	Ineng	Juaning
Kabayan	Lando	Mina	Nonoy	Onyok
Pedring	Quiel	Ramon	Sendong	Tisoy (unused)
Ursula (unused)	Viring (unused)	Weng (unused)	Yoyoy (unused)	Zigzag (unused)
Auxiliary list
Abe (unused)	Berto (unused)	Charo (unused)	Dado (unused)	Estoy (unused)
Felion (unused)	Gening (unused)	Herman (unused)	Irma (unused)	Jaime (unused)

During the season PAGASA used its own naming scheme for the 19 tropical cyclones, that either developed within or moved into their self-defined area of responsibility. The names were taken from a list of names, that had been last used during 2007 and were used again during 2015. The names Pedring, Quiel, Ramon and Sendong were used for the first (and only, in the cases of Pedring and Sendong) time during the year. PAGASA also retired the name Nonoy because it sounded similar to the name of President “Noynoy” Aquino at that time to avoid confusion.

==== Retirement ====
After this season, the Typhoon Committee retired the name Washi from its naming lists, and in February 2012, it was subsequently replaced with Hato for future seasons.

Meanwhile, the names Bebeng, Juaning, Mina, Pedring and Sendong were retired by PAGASA, as they had caused over ₱1 billion in damages, and in Sendong's case, over 300 deaths. They were subsequently replaced on the list with Betty, Jenny, Marilyn, Perla, and Sarah.

== Season effects ==
This table lists all of the tropical cyclones that were monitored during the 2011 Pacific typhoon season. Information on their intensity, duration, name, areas affected, primarily comes from the warning centres while death and damage reports come from either press reports or the relevant national disaster management agency and include any impact that was associated with the system.

Name	Dates	Peak intensity			Areas affected	Damage (USD)	Deaths	Ref(s).
Name	Dates	Category	Wind speed	Pressure	Areas affected	Damage (USD)	Deaths	Ref(s).
01W	April 1–4	Tropical depression	55 km/h (34 mph)	1,004 hPa (29.65 inHg)	None	None	None	
02W (Amang)	April 3–6	Tropical depression	55 km/h (34 mph)	1,000 hPa (29.53 inHg)	Mariana Islands	None	None	
Aere (Bebeng)	May 5–12	Tropical storm	75 km/h (47 mph)	992 hPa (29.29 inHg)	Philippines, Japan	$34.4 million	48	
Songda (Chedeng)	May 19–29	Violent typhoon	195 km/h (121 mph)	920 hPa (27.17 inHg)	Micronesia, Philippines, Japan, British Columbia	$65.2 million	17	
TD	May 31 – June 1	Tropical depression	Not specified	1,004 hPa (29.65 inHg)	None	None	None	
Sarika (Dodong)	June 8–11	Tropical storm	75 km/h (47 mph)	996 hPa (29.41 inHg)	Philippines, China	$248 million	28	
TD	June 14–15	Tropical depression	Not specified	1,004 hPa (29.65 inHg)	China	None	None	
Haima (Egay)	June 16–25	Tropical storm	75 km/h (47 mph)	985 hPa (29.09 inHg)	Philippines, China, Vietnam, Laos, Thailand	$167 million	18	
Meari (Falcon)	June 20–27	Severe tropical storm	110 km/h (68 mph)	975 hPa (28.79 inHg)	Philippines, China, Japan, Korea	$47 million	11	
Goring	July 8–10	Tropical depression	45 km/h (28 mph)	1,000 hPa (29.53 inHg)	Japan, Taiwan	None	None	
Ma-on (Ineng)	July 11–24	Very strong typhoon	175 km/h (109 mph)	935 hPa (27.61 inHg)	Mariana Islands, Japan	$50 million	5	
Tokage (Hanna)	July 13–15	Tropical storm	65 km/h (40 mph)	1,000 hPa (29.53 inHg)	None	None	None	
TD	July 16–17	Tropical depression	Not specified	1,000 hPa (29.53 inHg)	China	None		
Nock-ten (Juaning)	July 24–31	Severe tropical storm	95 km/h (59 mph)	985 hPa (29.09 inHg)	Philippines, China, Vietnam, Laos, Thailand	$126 million	128	
Muifa (Kabayan)	July 25 – August 9	Very strong typhoon	175 km/h (109 mph)	930 hPa (27.46 inHg)	Caroline Islands, Philippines, Japan, China, Korea	$480 million	22	
Lando	July 31 – August 2	Tropical depression	Not specified	1,002 hPa (29.59 inHg)	Philippines	None	None	
Merbok	August 2–9	Severe tropical storm	95 km/h (59 mph)	980 hPa (28.94 inHg)	None	None	None	
TD	August 2–4	Tropical depression	55 km/h (34 mph)	1,008 hPa (29.77 inHg)	Japan	None	None	
13W	August 8–14	Tropical depression	55 km/h (34 mph)	1,004 hPa (29.65 inHg)	None	None	None	
TD	August 8–10	Tropical depression	55 km/h (34 mph)	1,008 hPa (29.77 inHg)	None	None	None	
TD	August 20–25	Tropical depression	55 km/h (35 mph)	1,004 hPa (29.65 inHg)	None	None	None	
Nanmadol (Mina)	August 21–31	Very strong typhoon	185 km/h (115 mph)	925 hPa (27.32 inHg)	Philippines, Taiwan, China	$1.49 billion	38	
Talas	August 23 – September 5	Severe tropical storm	95 km/h (59 mph)	970 hPa (28.64 inHg)	Japan	$600 million	82	
Noru	September 2–6	Tropical storm	75 km/h (47 mph)	990 hPa (29.23 inHg)	None	None	None	
Kulap (Nonoy)	September 6–11	Tropical storm	65 km/h (40 mph)	1,000 hPa (29.53 inHg)	Japan, Korea	None	None	
Roke (Onyok)	September 8–22	Very strong typhoon	155 km/h (96 mph)	940 hPa (27.76 inHg)	Japan	$1.7 billion	13	
TD	September 13–15	Tropical depression	Not specified	1,002 hPa (29.59 inHg)	Taiwan	None	None	
Sonca	September 14–20	Strong typhoon	130 km/h (81 mph)	970 hPa (28.64 inHg)	None	None	None	
Nesat (Pedring)	September 23–30	Strong typhoon	150 km/h (93 mph)	950 hPa (28.05 inHg)	Philippines, China, Vietnam	$2.12 billion	98	
Haitang	September 24–27	Tropical storm	65 km/h (40 mph)	996 hPa (29.41 inHg)	China, Vietnam, Laos	$20 million	25	
Nalgae (Quiel)	September 26 – October 5	Very strong typhoon	175 km/h (109 mph)	935 hPa (27.61 inHg)	Philippines, China, Vietnam	$250 million	18	
Banyan (Ramon)	October 9–14	Tropical storm	65 km/h (40 mph)	1,002 hPa (29.59 inHg)	Palau, Philippines	$2.1 million	10	
TD	October 10–13	Tropical depression	Not specified	1,006 hPa (29.71 inHg)	China, Vietnam	None	None	
24W	November 7–10	Tropical depression	45 km/h (28 mph)	1,004 hPa (29.65 inHg)	None	None	None	
25W	December 4–5	Tropical depression	45 km/h (28 mph)	1,006 hPa (29.71 inHg)	None	None	None	
26W	December 10–14	Tropical depression	55 km/h (34 mph)	1,004 hPa (29.65 inHg)	Philippines	None	4	
Washi (Sendong)	December 13–19	Severe tropical storm	95 km/h (59 mph)	992 hPa (29.29 inHg)	Caroline Islands, Philippines	$97.8 million	2,546	
TD	December 24	Tropical depression	Not specified	1,002 hPa (29.59 inHg)	None	None	None	
TD	December 31, 2011 – January 1, 2012	Tropical depression	Not specified	1,008 hPa (29.77 inHg)	Malaysia	None	None	
Season aggregates
39 systems	April 1, 2011 – January 1, 2012		195 km/h (121 mph)	920 hPa (27.17 inHg)		$7.48 billion	3,111	

== See also ==
- Tropical cyclones in 2011
- List of Pacific typhoon seasons
- 2011 Pacific hurricane season
- 2011 Atlantic hurricane season
- 2011 North Indian Ocean cyclone season
- South-West Indian Ocean cyclone seasons: 2010–11, 2011–12
- Australian region cyclone seasons: 2010–11, 2011–12
- South Pacific cyclone seasons: 2010–11, 2011–12
- South Atlantic tropical cyclone
