= Weather of 2011 =

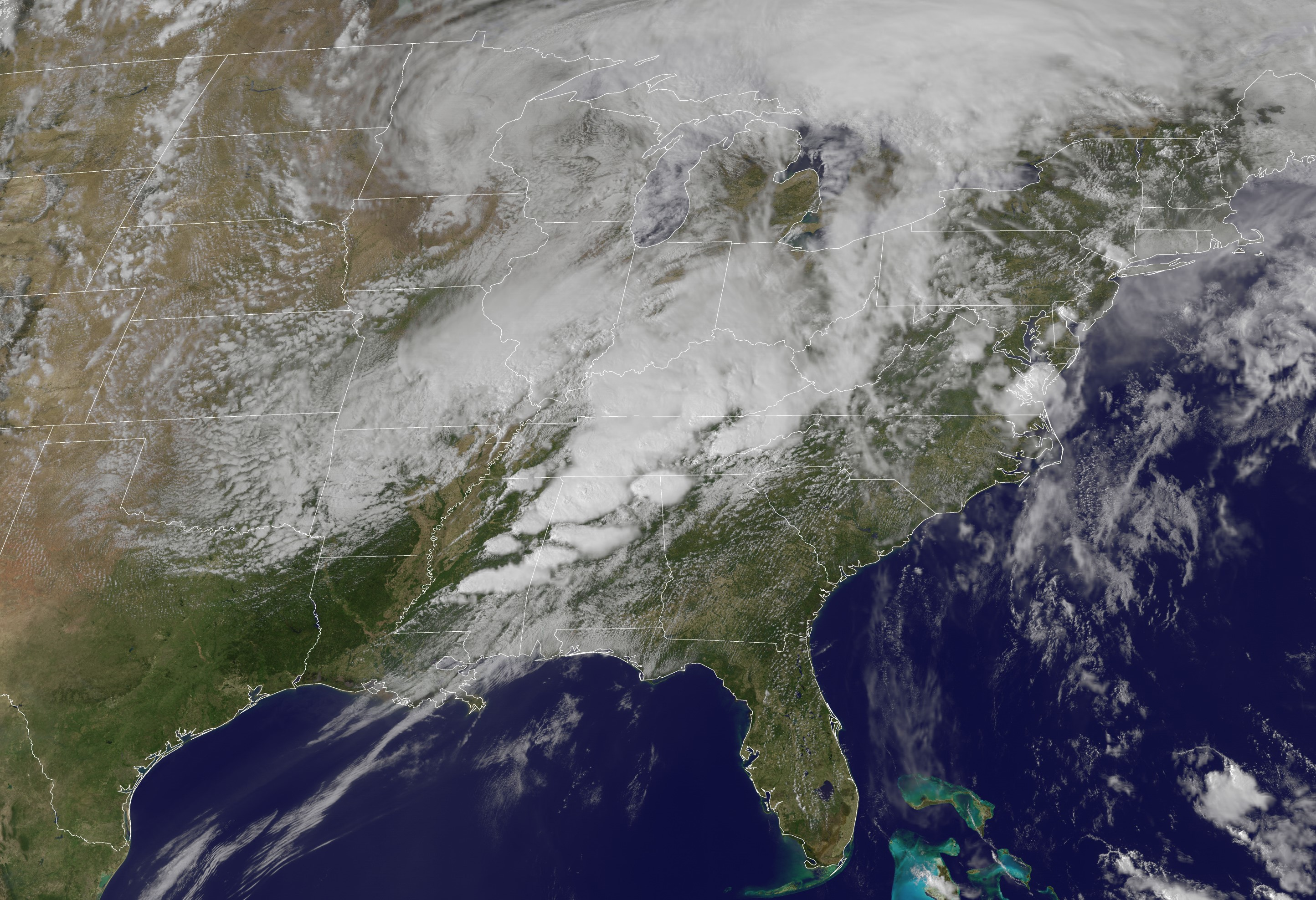
The extratropical cyclone that produced the 2011 Super Outbreak, the largest and deadliest tornado outbreak of 2011.

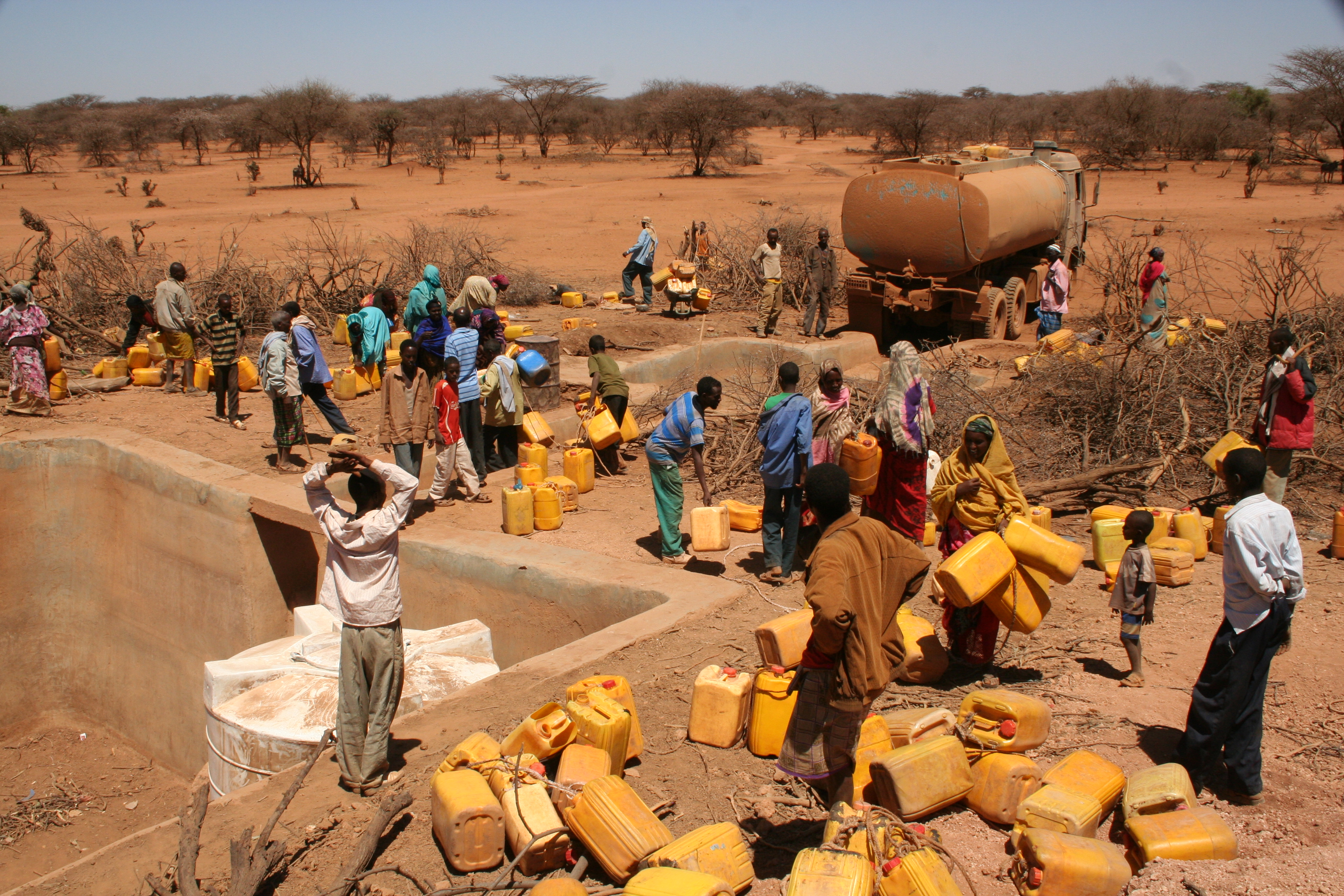
Water distribution in southern Ethiopia, amid the East Africa drought that killed over 50,000 people

The following is a list of weather events that occurred in 2011. The year began with La Niña conditions. There were several natural disasters around the world from various types of weather, including blizzards, cold waves, droughts, heat waves, tornadoes, and tropical cyclones.

== Global conditions ==
There was a strong La Niña event that began in 2010, and continued into 2012, which affected global weather conditions. The year was the second-wettest on record, only behind 2010, although some areas, such as the Horn of Africa, were drier than normal. The increased precipitation caused global sea level to drop by 5 mm (0.20 in). The global land temperature was the 8th warmest on record at the time, 0.8 °C (1.49 °F) above the 20th century average, and was also the warmest ever during a La Niña event.

== Deadliest events ==
Deadliest meteorological events during 2011
Rank	Event	Date(s)	Deaths (+Missing)	Refs
1	East Africa drought	July 2011 – 2012	50,000+	
2	Tropical Storm Washi	December 13–19	1,257	
3	2011 Super Outbreak	April 25–28	324	
4	Deep Depression BOB 04	October 19–20	215	
5	Tornado outbreak sequence of May 21–26, 2011	May 21–26	178	
6				
7				
8				
9				
10				

== Types ==
The following listed different types of special weather conditions worldwide.

=== Droughts and heat waves ===
The deadliest weather event of the year was the East African drought, with the resulting food shortages and famine killing more than 50,000 people, many of them children. From March to August, a heat wave and drought persisted across much of the central United States, causing US$12 billion in damage and 95 deaths.

=== Tornadoes ===
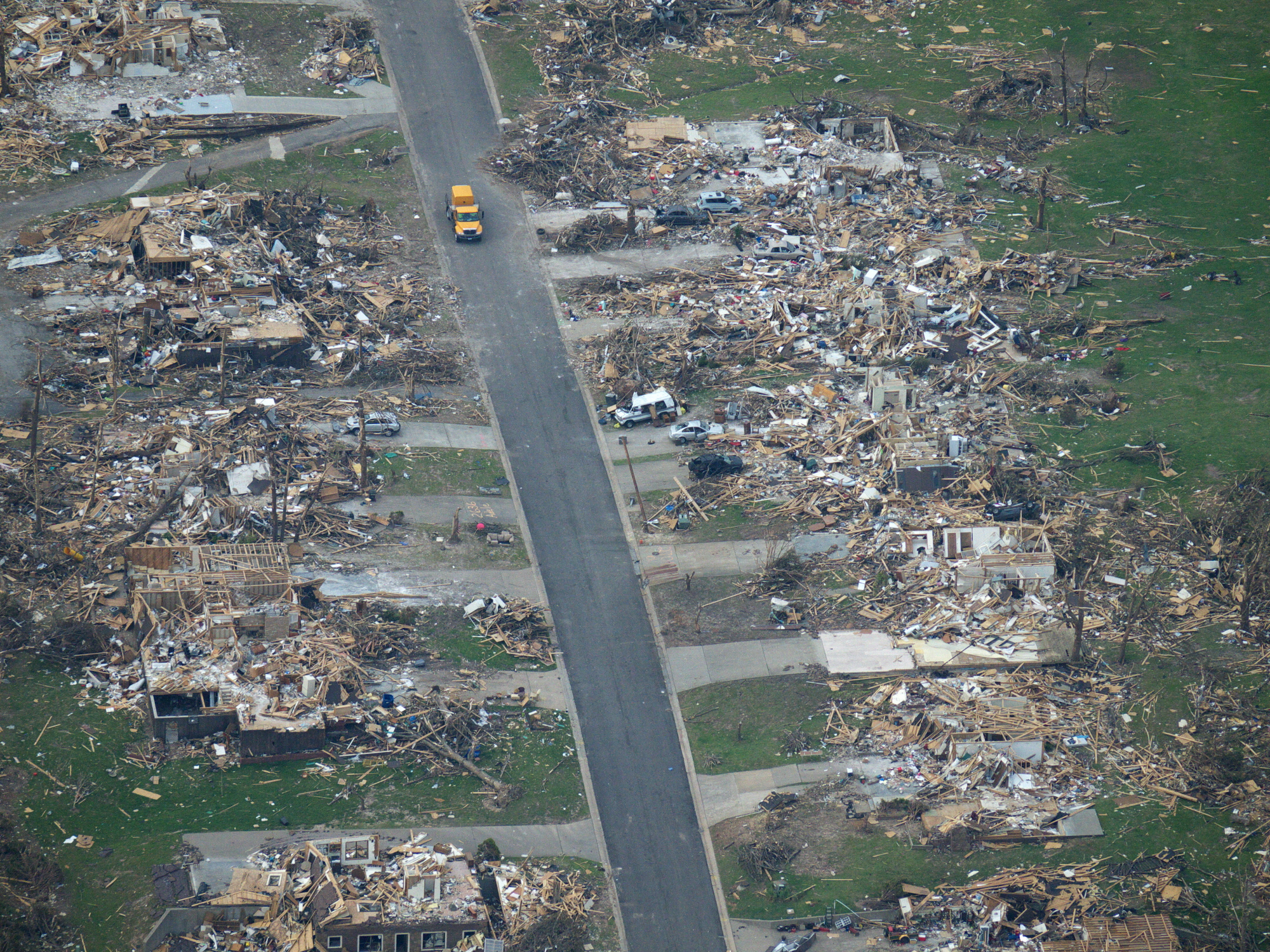
Aerial footage after the EF5 Joplin, Missouri tornado, which became the deadliest single tornado in more than 61 years

Throughout the year, there were 1,706 tornadoes in the United States, the third-highest on record. There were 553 deaths from tornadoes, making it the deadliest year for tornadoes in the country since modern records began in 1950. In late April, the U.S. experienced its most substantial tornado outbreak on record, with 360 confirmed tornadoes, including four EF5 tornadoes. The event resulted in 324 fatalities and US$10.2 billion in damage. A month later, an EF5 tornado hit Joplin, Missouri, killing 158 people, making it the deadliest tornado since 1950.

=== Tropical and subtropical cyclones ===
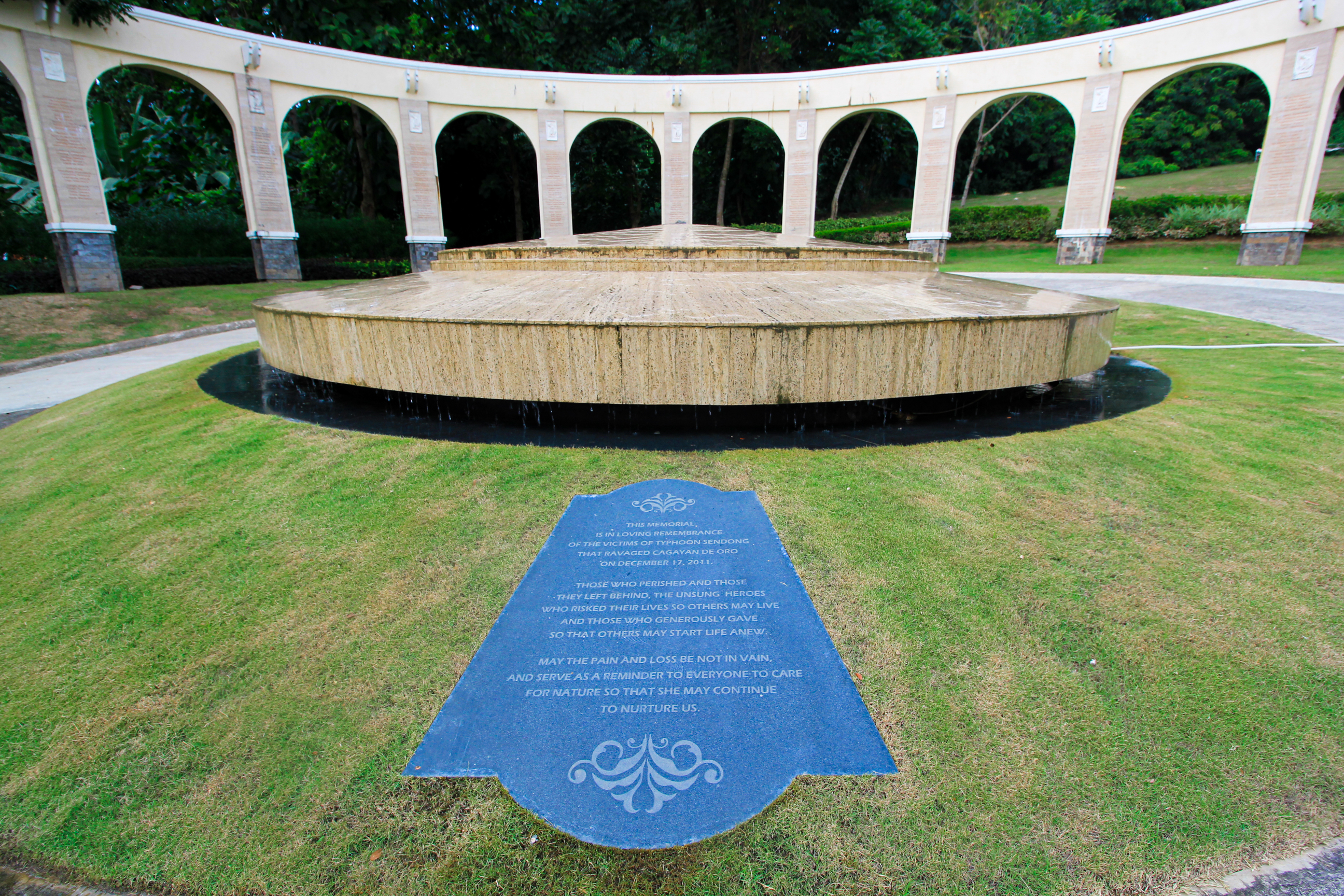
A memorial in the Philippines to commemorate the deadly flooding from Tropical Storm Washi, known locally as Sendong

The Japan Meteorological Agency tracked 21 tropical storms in the western Pacific during the year, making it the fourth-quietest season since accurate records began in 1951. Of these, eight attained typhoon status, the strongest of which, Songda, attained 10 minute sustained winds of 195 km/h (120 mph) and a minimum pressure of 920 hectopascals (27 inHg). The first named storm, Aere, was named on May 7, while the final, Tropical Storm Washi, dissipated on December 19, days after causing damaging and deadly floods in the Philippines. Washi, known locally as Sendong, killed at least 1,257 people in the Philippines. The National Hurricane Center followed 19 tropical storms in the Atlantic Ocean, 10 becoming hurricanes, as well as 11 tropical storms in the eastern Pacific Ocean, 7 becoming hurricanes. In July, Hurricane Dora became the year's strongest tropical cyclone in the western hemisphere, with 1 minute sustained winds of 250 km/h (155 mph). Hurricane Irene was the year's costliest and deadliest for the Atlantic Ocean, killing 48 people and leaving US$13.5 billion in damage as it moved from the Caribbean up the East Coast of the United States. In October, the North Indian Ocean spawned its first cyclonic storm, Keila offshore Oman. The only other cyclonic storm, Thane, struck southeastern India in December. Outside of the official tropical cyclone basins, there was also an unusual system in the Mediterranean, Tropical Storm Rolf, which struck southern France.

=== Wildfires ===
Amid widespread drought conditions, there were widespread wildfires across the southern and southwestern United States from June to November, causing US$1.8 billion in damage and five deaths.

== Timeline ==
This is a timeline of deadly weather events during 2011.

=== February ===
- February 1–3 – The Groundhog Day blizzard killed 36 people across the central and northeastern United States, with damage estimated at US$1.8 billion.
- February 9–19 – Cyclone Bingiza struck Madagascar in three different locations, dropping heavy rainfall across the island which caused 34 fatailties.

=== April ===
- April–May – Floods along the Mississippi River killed nine people and left US$3 billion in damage.
- April 4–5 – A derecho and tornado outbreak across the southeastern United States killed nine people and left US$2.8 billion in damage.
- April 14–16 – A tornado outbreak swept across the central United States, with 178 confirmed tornadoes; there were 38 deaths and US$2.1 billion related to the event.
- April 25–28 – A widespread and deadly tornado outbreak affected much of the eastern United States, with more than 343 tornadoes confirmed, resulting in 324 fatalities and US$10.2 billion in damage. It was the largest tornado outbreak on record in the United States.

=== May ===
- May–June – Floods along the Missouri River, related to melted snowpack, killed five people and left US$2 billion in damage.
- May 5–12 – Tropical Storm Aere dropped heavy rainfall in the eastern Philippines, killing 35 people.
- May 19–29 – Typhoon Songda brushed the eastern Philippines, causing four fatalities.
- May 22–27 – A tornado outbreak across the central United States spawned 180 tornadoes, resulting in US$9.1 billion in damage and 178 deaths. Among the tornadoes was an EF5 tornado that struck Joplin, Missouri, which killed 158 people, making it the deadliest tornado in the country since 1947, as well as the costliest single tornado in the country.

=== June ===
- June 1 – A rare tornado outbreak impacted New England, particularly in Massachusetts where an intense and long track tornado killed 3.
- June 8–11 – Tropical Storm Sarika developed west of the Philippines and moved into southeastern China, killing nine people.
- June 16–22 – A deep depression hit eastern India, causing 12 fatalities, with hundreds of houses collapsed due to heavy rains.
- June 18–22 – A tornado outbreak across the central United States resulted in US$1.5 billion in damage and three deaths.
- June 19–22 – Hurricane Beatriz killed four people when it hit southern Mexico.
- June 20–27 – Tropical Storm Meari moved from the Philippine Sea to the East China Sea, with 12 fatalities in the Philippines.
- June 28–July 1 – Tropical Storm Arlene struck the gulf coast of Mexico, killing 22 people.

=== July ===
- July 10–11 – A derecho moved across the central United States, killing two people and leaving US$1.2 billion in damage.
- July 24–31 – Tropical Storm Nock-ten hit the Philippines, China, and later Vietnam, resulting in at least 77 fatalities along its path.
- July 27–August 9 – Typhoon Muifa moved across the western Pacific, eventually striking near the border of China and North Korea; it killed eight people in the Philippines.

=== August ===
- August 2–7 – While Tropical Storm Emily moved through the Caribbean, a man died from electrocution related to a downed wire.
- August 19–22 – Tropical Storm Harvey struck Belize and Mexico, killing five people in the latter country.
- August 21–28 – Hurricane Irene moved through the Caribbean and up the East Coast of the United States, killing 48 people and leaving US$13.5 billion in damage.
- August 21–31 – Typhoon Nanmadol brushed the northern Philippines before striking Taiwan and mainland China. There were 36 fatalities in the Philippines.
- August 29–September 10 – Hurricane Katia killed four people as it moved around the Atlantic Ocean through the British Isles.

=== September ===
- September 2–7 – Tropical Storm Lee struck Louisiana and later produced widespread flooding across the northeastern United States. The storm killed 21 people and damaged more than 5,000 houses, incurring about $2.5 billion in damage.
- September 7–12 – Hurricane Nate struck the Mexican state of Veracruz, killing five people.
- September 22–23 – A depression dropped heavy rainfall across eastern India, killing 38 people.
- September 24–30 – Typhoon Nesat moved through the Philippines and later struck China. In the Philippines, the typhoon killed 85 people and left ₱15.6 billion (US$356 million) in damage.
- September 26–October 5 – Typhoon Nalgae followed Nesat just days later, striking the Philippines and southern China, killing 17 people.

=== October ===
- October 6–12 – Hurricane Jova moved ashore southwestern Mexico, leading to nine fatalities.
- October 9–14 – Tropical Storm Banyan moved through the Philippines, killing ten people.
- October 12 – Tropical Depression Twelve-E made landfall in southeastern Mexico, producing heavy rainfall across Central America as part of a broader monsoonal system. The floods killed at least 36 people across the region.
- October 19–20 – A deep depression struck Bangladesh, with its heavy rains causing floods in Myanmar that killed at least 215 people.
- October 29–November 4 – Cyclone Keila developed and looped just off the coast of Oman, causing flash floods that killed 14 people, as well as another five deaths due to a shipwreck.

=== November ===
- November 7–10 – An unusual Mediterranean tropical-like cyclone, named Tropical Storm Rolf, struck France, killing 12 people.
- November 8–11 – Rip currents from Tropical Storm Sean killed a swimmer along the east coast of Florida.
- November 26–December 1 – A developing deep depression in the Arabian Sea produced gusty winds and heavy rainfall over Sri Lanka, killing 20 people.

=== December ===
- December 13–19 – Tropical Storm Washi moved through the southern Philippines, killing 1,257 people and wrecking 13,337 houses.
- December 20–22 – Rains from a subtropical depression in the Mozambique Channel caused floods in Tanzania, resulting in 43 fatalities.
- December 25–31 – Cyclone Thane struck southeastern India, wrecking thousands of boats and houses, resulting in 46 deaths and damage estimated at over ₹1.3 billion (US$235 million).

Global weather by year
Preceded by 2010	Weather of 2011	Succeeded by 2012
