= 2011 North Indian Ocean cyclone season =

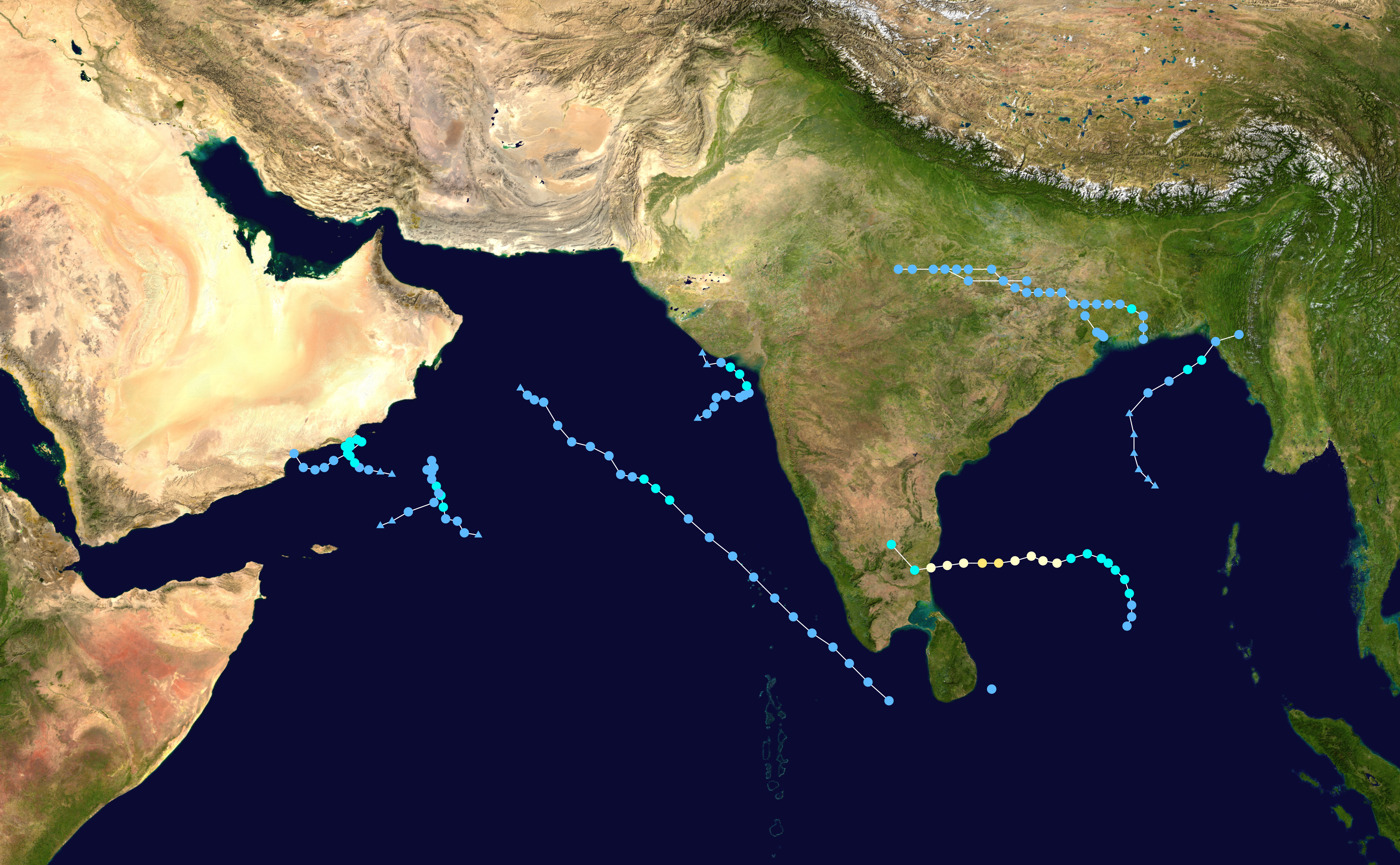
- Season summary map

Seasonal boundaries
- First system formed: February 2, 2011
- Last system dissipated: December 31, 2011

Strongest storm
- Name: Thane
  - Maximum winds: 140 km/h (85 mph) (3-minute sustained)
  - Lowest pressure: 969 hPa (mbar)

Seasonal statistics
- Depressions: 10
- Deep depressions: 6
- Cyclonic storms: 2
- Severe cyclonic storms: 1
- Very severe cyclonic storms: 1
- Total fatalities: 367 total
- Total damage: $603 million (2011 USD)

Related articles
- 2011 Atlantic hurricane season; 2011 Pacific hurricane season; 2011 Pacific typhoon season

The 2011 North Indian Ocean cyclone season was the least active tropical cyclone season in the North Indian Ocean since 1993. Only two cyclonic storms formed, below the average of four to six. The North Indian Ocean cyclone season has no official bounds, but cyclones tend to form between April and December, with peaks in May and November. These dates conventionally delimit the period of each year when most tropical cyclones form in the northern Indian Ocean. The scope of this article is limited to the Indian Ocean in the Northern Hemisphere, east of the Horn of Africa and west of the Malay Peninsula. There are two main seas in the North Indian Ocean — the Arabian Sea to the west of the Indian subcontinent, abbreviated ARB by the India Meteorological Department (IMD); and the Bay of Bengal to the east, abbreviated BOB by the IMD. The systems that form over land are abbreviated as LAND.

This season was the first season since 1993 where only two named storms formed. However, the systems that formed would cause damages of greater than $1.64 million USD and cause approximately 360 fatalities. It is believed that La Niña, a quasiperiodic climate pattern which causes a rise in surface pressure over the Indian Ocean, making the region drier, was the main cause for the below-active activity in the basin.

== Season summary ==
This season, 9 depressions developed from low-pressure areas, with six intensifying into deep depressions. Out of the deep depressions, two would develop into cyclonic storms. One of the cyclonic storms would later intensify into a severe cyclonic storm.

The first depression of the season developed on February 2 about 300 km (190 mi) to the east of Colombo, Sri Lanka. The depression brought isolated rainfall to parts of Sri Lanka, while remaining near stationary before weakening into an area of low pressure early the next day.

Depression ARB 01 formed in early June near India, before Deep Depression BOB 02 formed a few days later. Land Depression 01 formed on July 22, and dissipated a day later. Depression BOB 03 formed on September 22, and soon made landfall on India. Depression BOB 03 dissipated the next day, on September 23. October was a much more active month, as Deep Depression BOB 04 and Deep Depression ARB 02 both formed, during this period of time. Then Cyclonic Storm Keila formed in November and came ashore in Oman, before Depression ARB03 formed and dissipated near the Oman coast.

== Systems ==
=== Depression BOB 01 ===
- Depression (IMD)
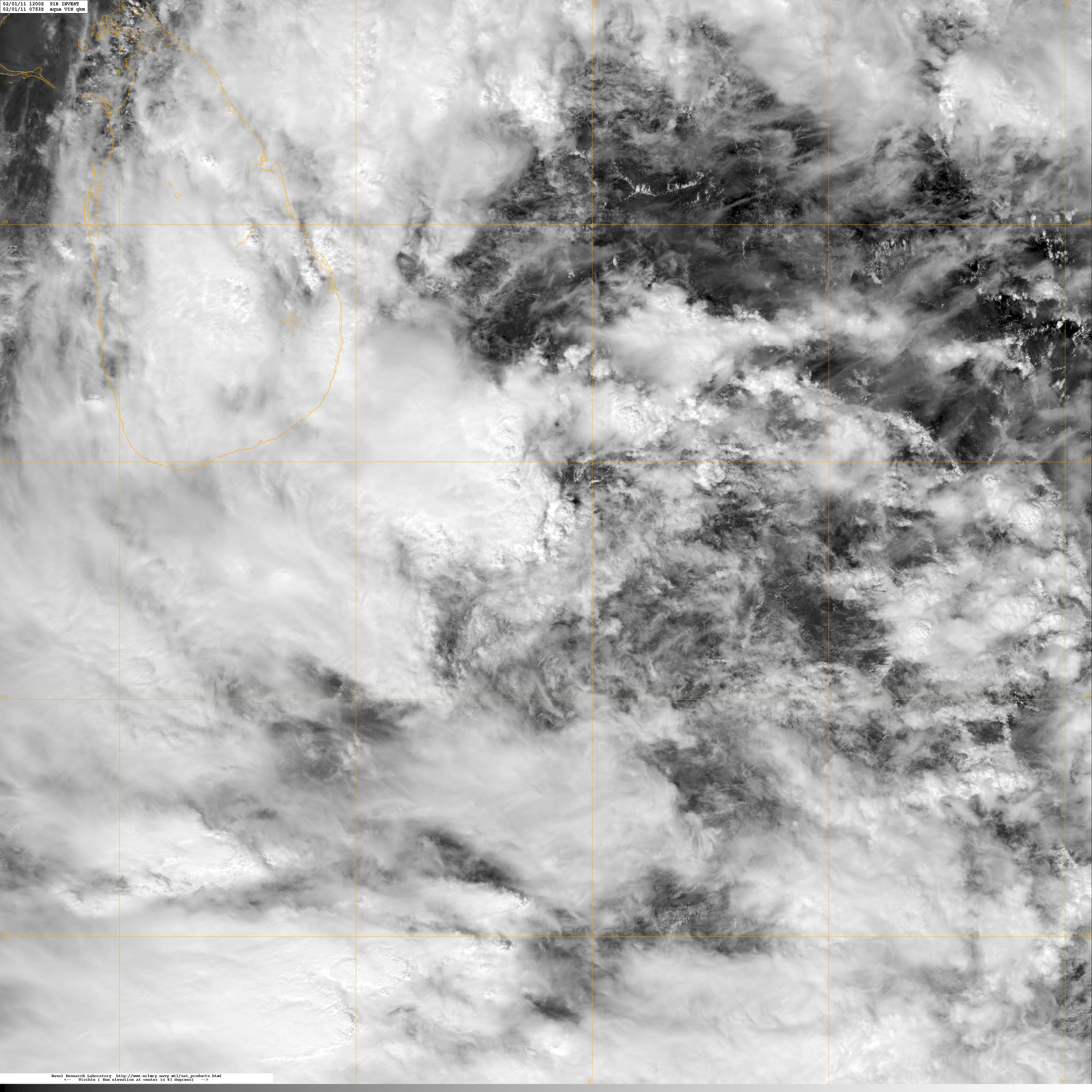
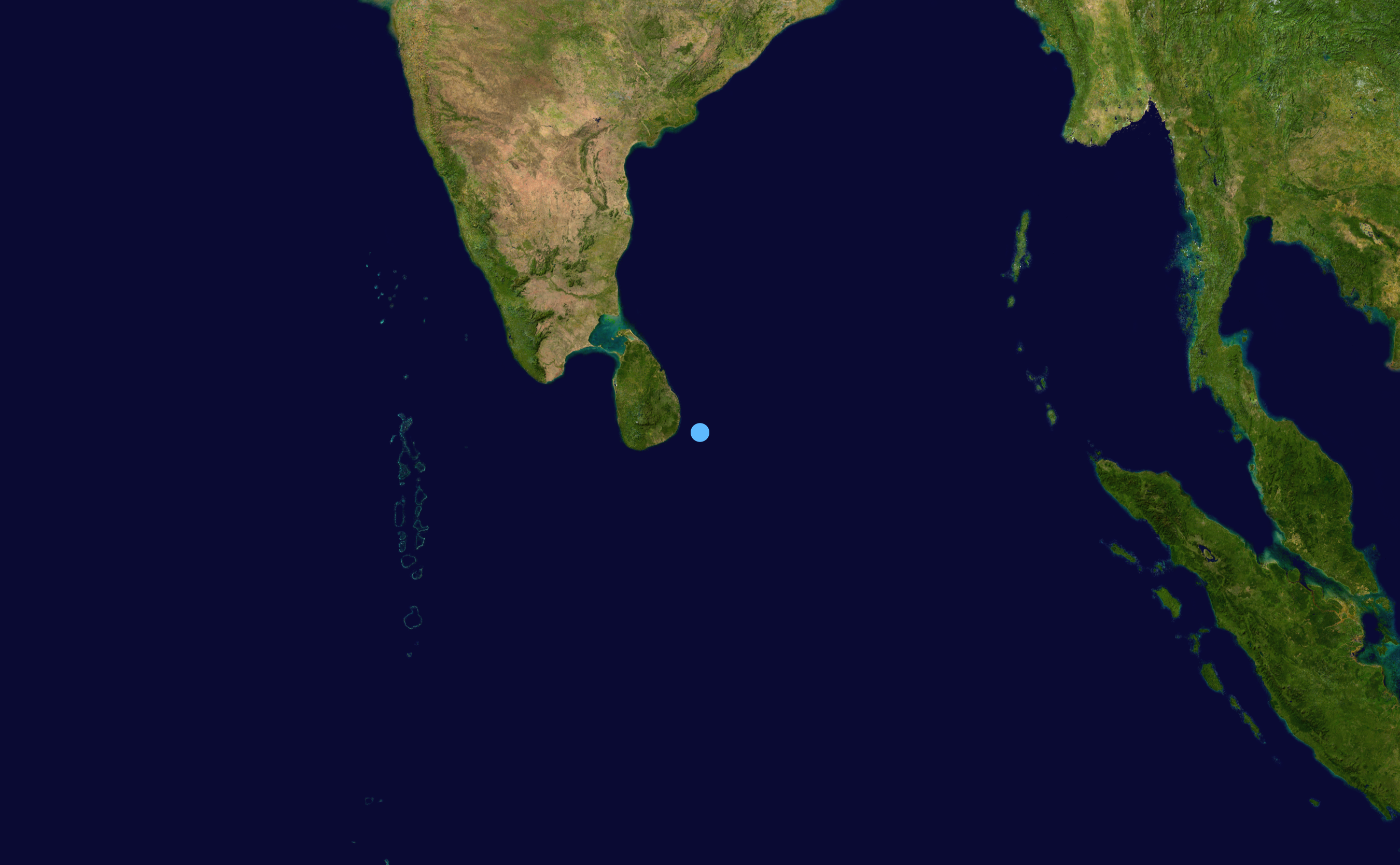
- Duration: February 2 – February 3
- Peak intensity: 45 km/h (30 mph) (3-min); 1002 hPa (mbar)

On February 2, the IMD upgraded an area of low pressure, located approximately 100 km southeast of Pottuvil, Sri Lanka, to a depression, giving it the designation "BOB 01." The convection in the system gradually increased and the system drifted towards land. Early on the next day, the IMD downgraded the system into a remnant low because of its proximity to land and weakened.

Following catastrophic floods in December 2010 and January 2011, the depression brought additional rainfall to Sri Lanka. The subsequent floods and mudslides killed 18 people and affected nearly 1.2 million. Numerous roads were washed away as reservoirs across the island overflowed their banks and inundated surrounding communities. In the wake of the floods, the Government of Sri Lanka allocated 33 billion Sri Lankan rupee ($287 million US$) for rehabilitation.

=== Depression ARB 01 ===
- Depression (IMD)
- Tropical storm (SSHWS)
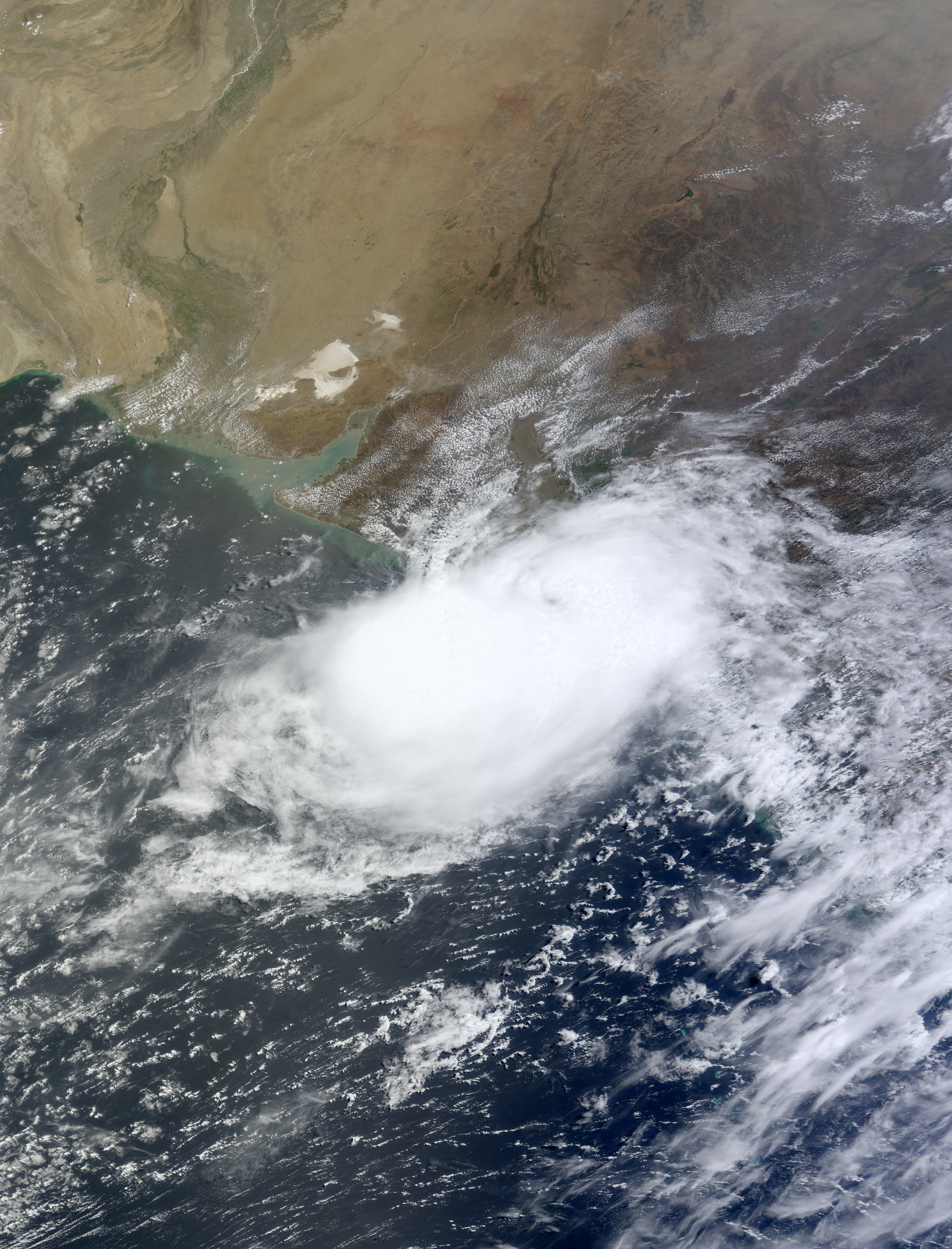
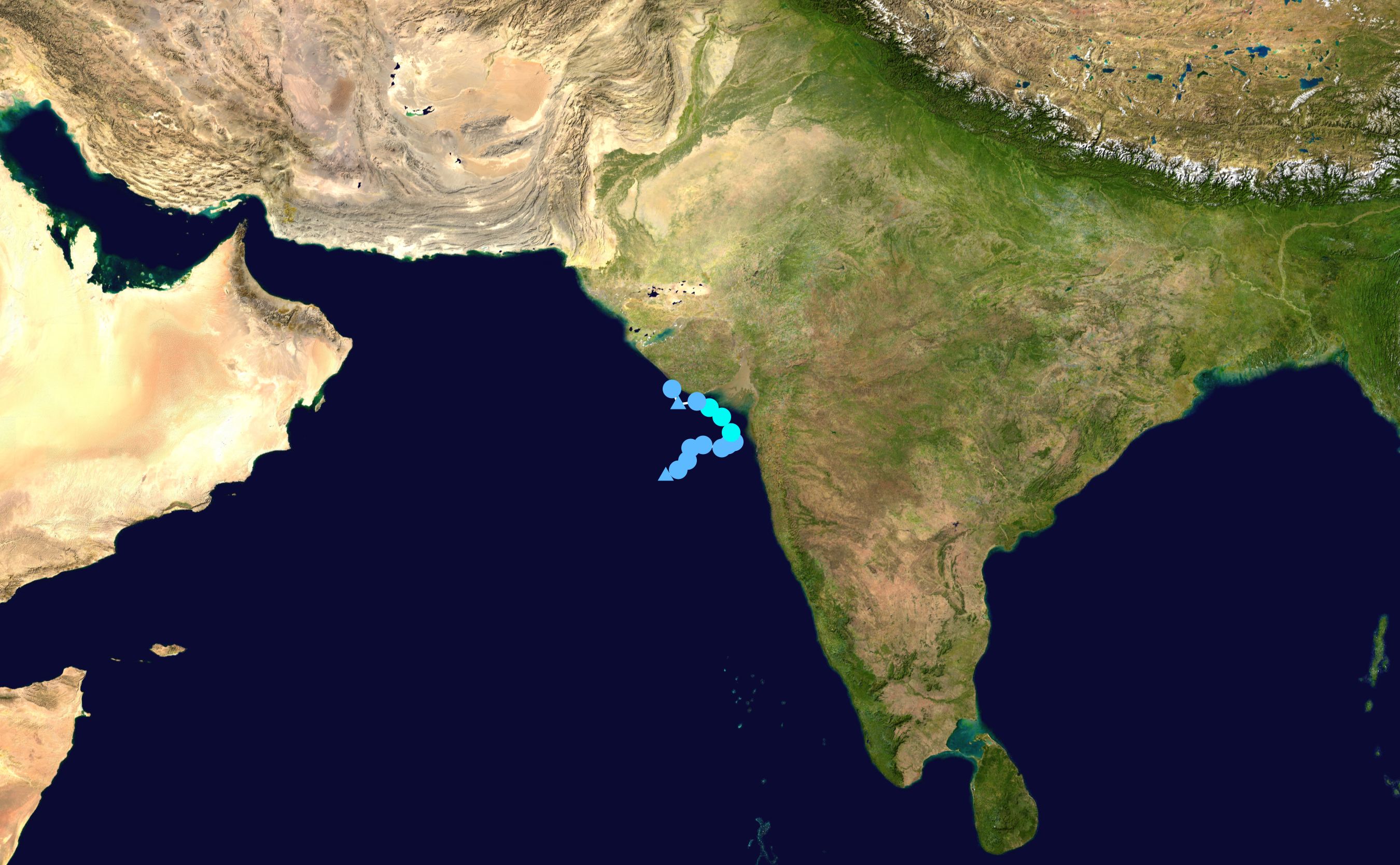
- Duration: June 11 – June 12
- Peak intensity: 45 km/h (30 mph) (3-min); 996 hPa (mbar)

In early June, a low-pressure area formed over the Arabian Sea. The low-pressure area remained stationary and became more well marked. On June 11, the IMD upgraded the area of low pressure to a depression giving it the designation "ARB 01". The same day, the JTWC designated the system as Tropical Cyclone 01A. At that time it was located approximately 180 kilometres (110 mi) northwest of Mumbai, India and 150 kilometres (93 mi) southeast of Veraval, Gujarat. Later, on June 12, IMD reported that the depression had crossed the Saurashtra coast of India about 25 km east of Diu. Later on the same day, the IMD reported that the depression had weakened into a well-marked low-pressure area in their last bulletin for the system.

=== Deep Depression BOB 02 ===
- Deep depression (IMD)
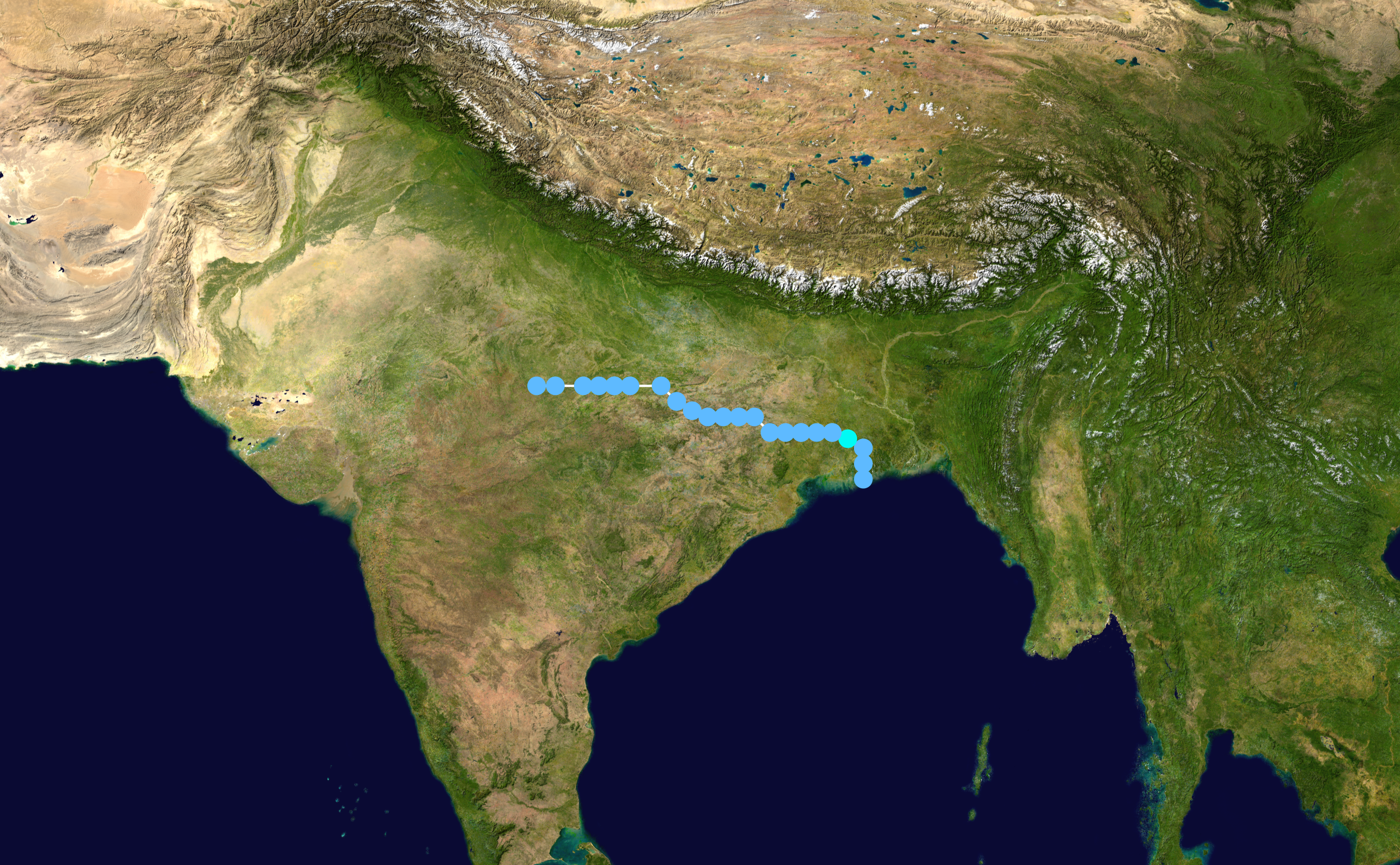
- Duration: June 16 – June 23
- Peak intensity: 65 km/h (40 mph) (3-min); 978 hPa (mbar)

On June 16, the IMD upgraded a well marked low-pressure area (WML), located about 100 km east-southeast of Sagar Island, 150 km southeast of Kolkata and 150 km west-southwest of Khepupara (Bangladesh), to a depression, giving it the designation "BOB 02". On June 16, the depression intensified into a deep depression and crossed the West Bengal coast about 100 km east of Sagar Island. On the same day, at 1900 hrs UTC, the JTWC issued a Tropical Cyclone Formation Alert (TCFA). The system drifted further inland and the JTWC cancelled their TCFA the next day. The system weakened into a depression by June 18 and laid centered over Jharkhand. The depression gradually drifted westwards and moved onto northern Madhya Pradesh by June 21. and slowly dissipated into a well marked low-pressure area on June 23.

Heavy rains across West Bengal triggered widespread flooding and landslides that killed at least six people.

=== Depression LAND 01 ===
- Depression (IMD)
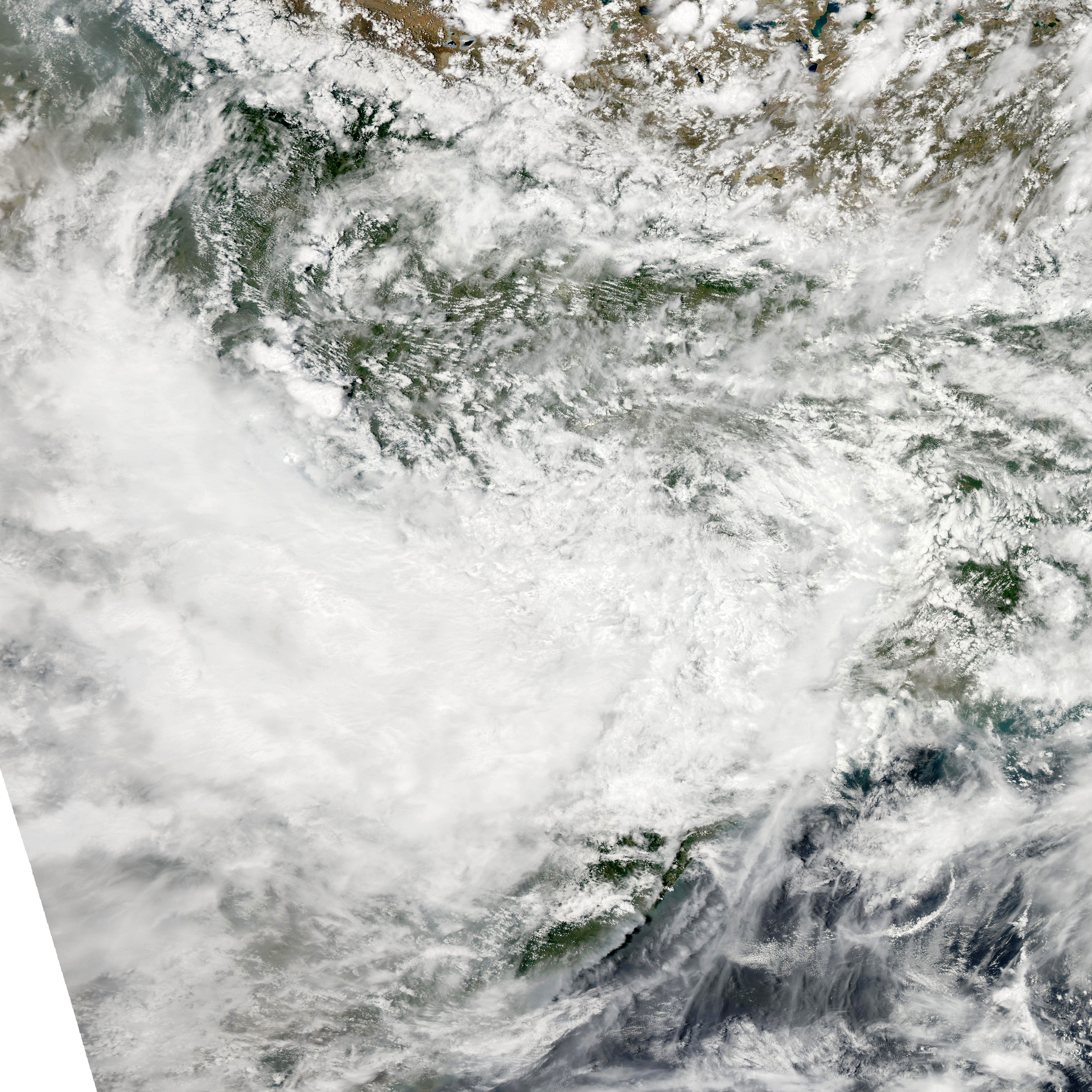
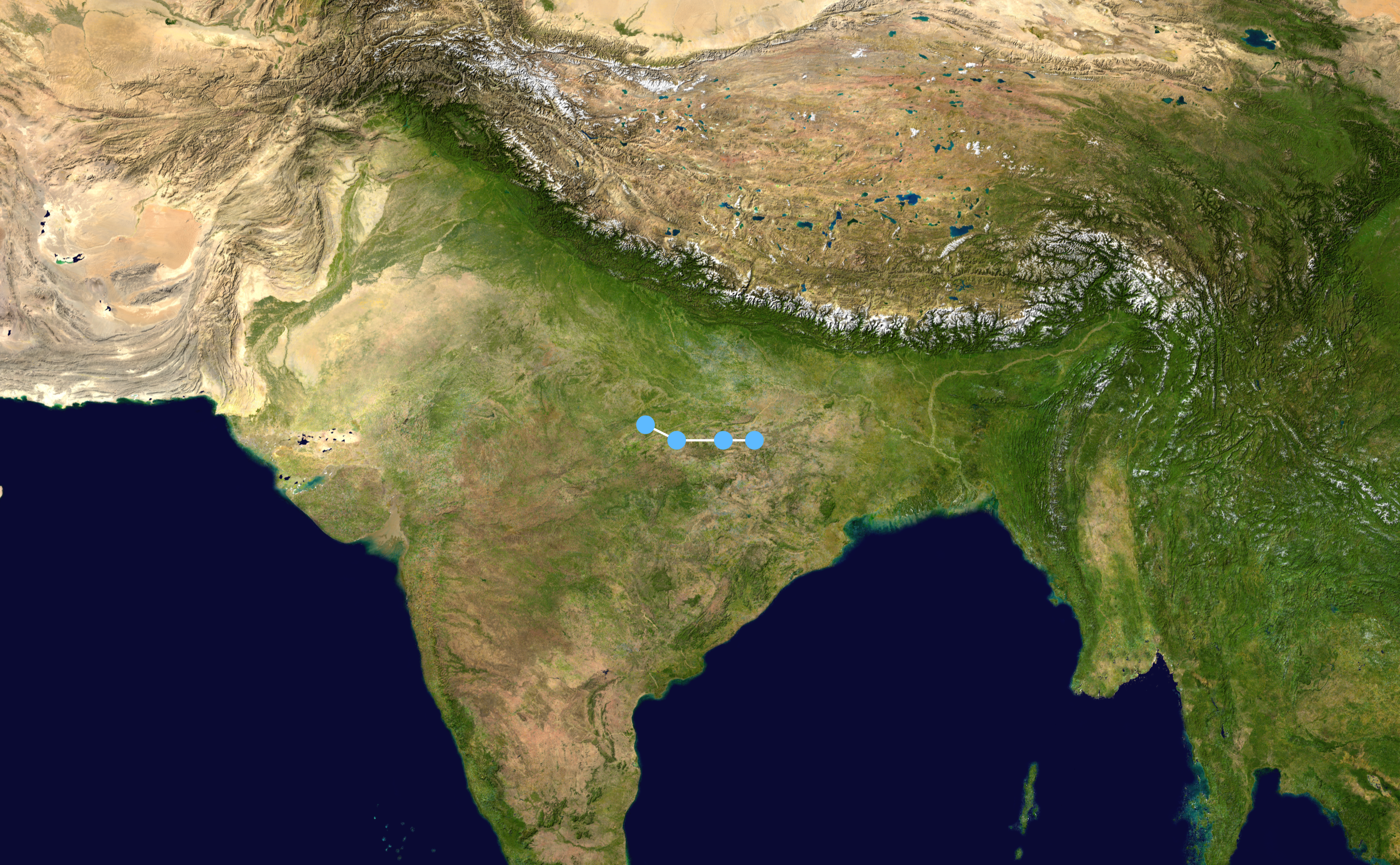
- Duration: July 22 – July 23
- Peak intensity: 35 km/h (25 mph) (3-min); 990 hPa (mbar)

On July 21 as the Madden–Julian oscillation entered its fifth phase, the Bay of Bengal became favourable for tropical cyclogenesis. As a result of this and an upper tropospheric cyclonic vortex, an area of low pressure developed on July 21, over the Gangetic West Bengal about 50 km (30 mi) to the southeast of Daltonganj. During the next day the IMD reported that the low-pressure area had intensified into a land depression, with peak 3-minute sustained windspeeds of 35 km/h (20 mph). During that day, the depression moved towards the northwest under the influence of a monsoon trough before it weakened into a low-pressure area during July 23. Under the influence of the system, the Indian states of Madhya Pradesh, Rajasthan, Gujarat, Chhattisgarh and Vidarbha saw widespread heavy rainfall, however, no economic damage was reported.

=== Depression BOB 03 ===
- Depression (IMD)
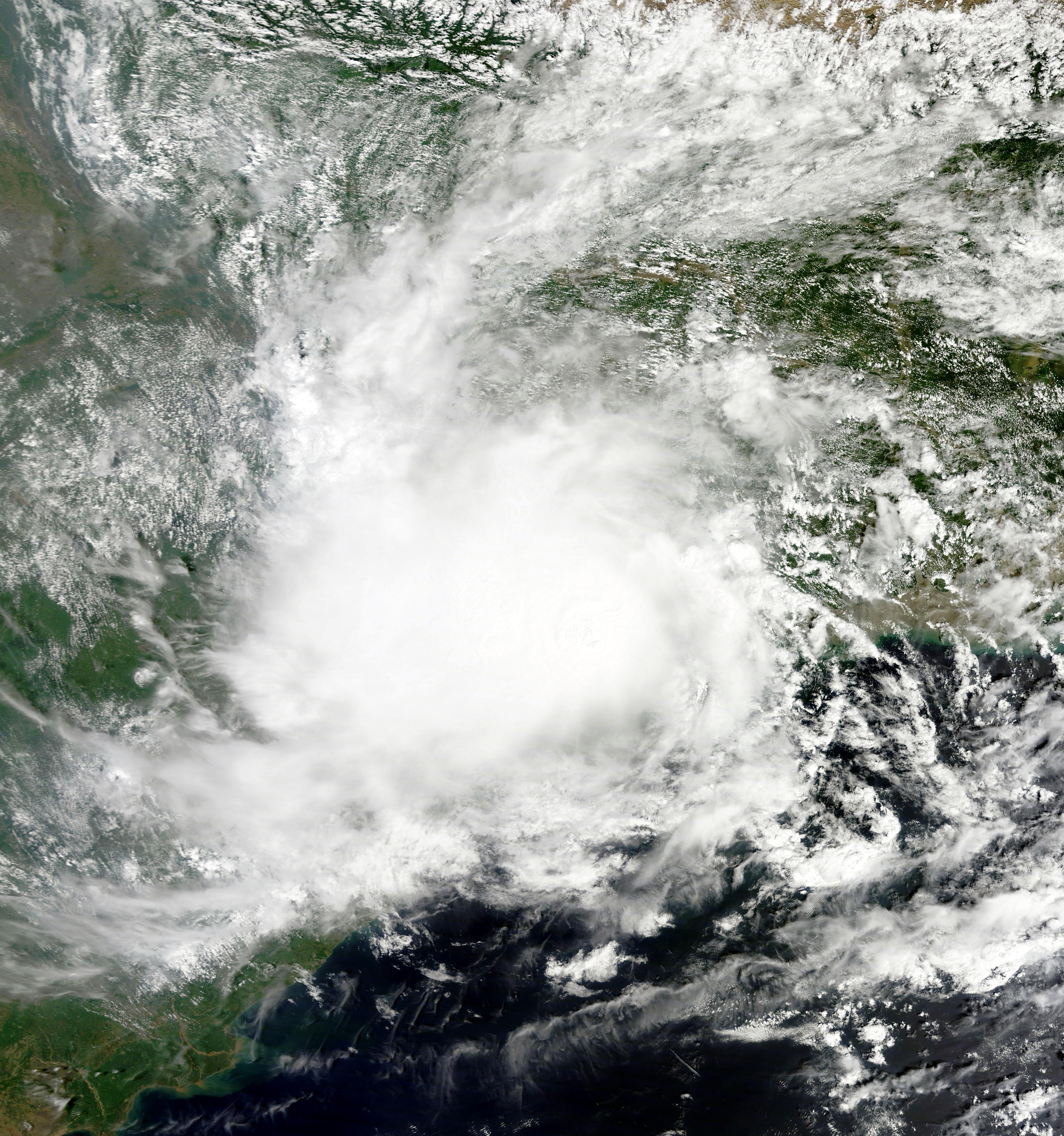
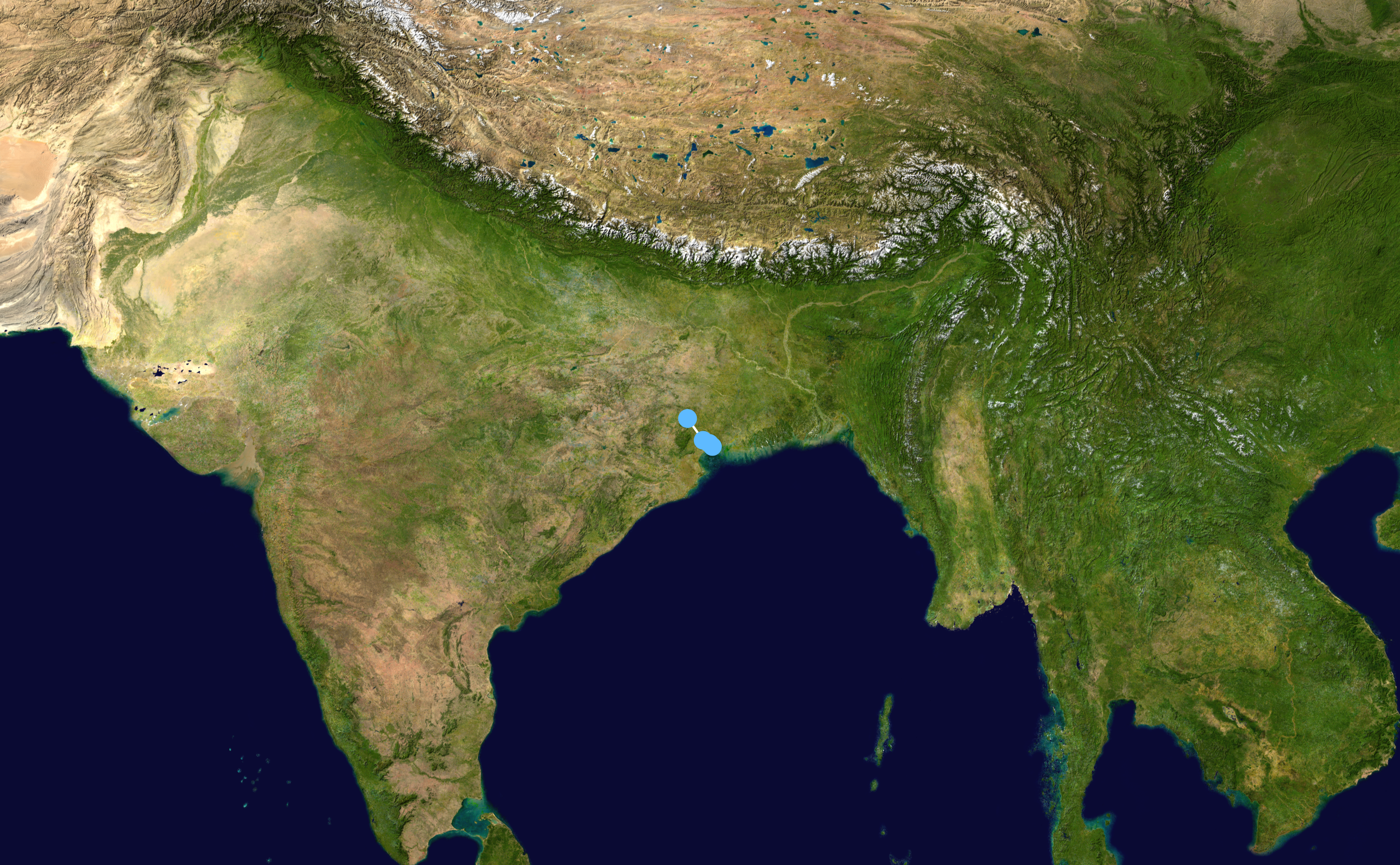
- Duration: September 22 – September 23
- Peak intensity: 45 km/h (30 mph) (3-min); 995 hPa (mbar)

Late on September 20, an area of low pressure developed approximately 200 nautical miles (370 km; 230 mi) south of Chittagong, Bangladesh. Under the influence of strong vertical wind shear and monsoonal activity in the Bay of Bengal, the system was unable to strengthen and the JTWC later reported that the system had dissipated. However, on September 22, the IMD started monitoring the system as a Depression and initiated bulletins on the system, designating it BOB 03. Late on that day, BOB 03 drifted northwest and made landfall over north Orissa close to Balasore. After moving further northwestwards, the depression remained practically stationary over Jharkhand. By the evening of September 23, IMD reported that the depression had weakened into a well-marked low-pressure area in their final bulletin for the system, as the storm dissipated to a remnant low.

As the depression made landfall, heavy rains threatened to cause floods for the second time within two weeks in the Bramhani and Baitarani rivers. By the evening of September 22, 90 villages in Jajpur were displaced due to the sudden swelling of the Baitarani River. At least 38 people were killed in flood-related incidents across Orissa. The worst flooding took place in the districts of Jajpur and Bhadrak where at least 18 people perished.

=== Deep Depression BOB 04 ===
- Deep depression (IMD)
- Tropical storm (SSHWS)
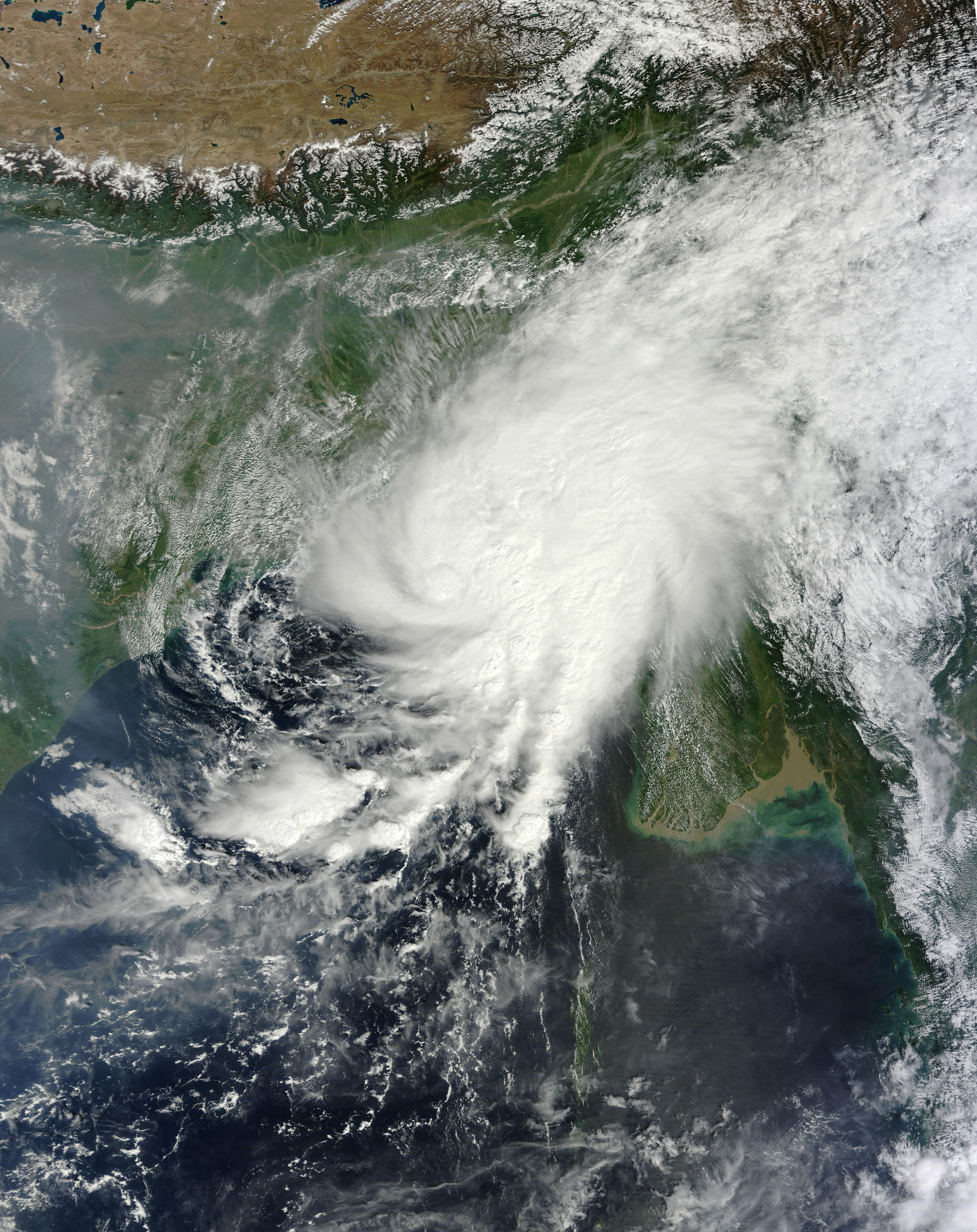
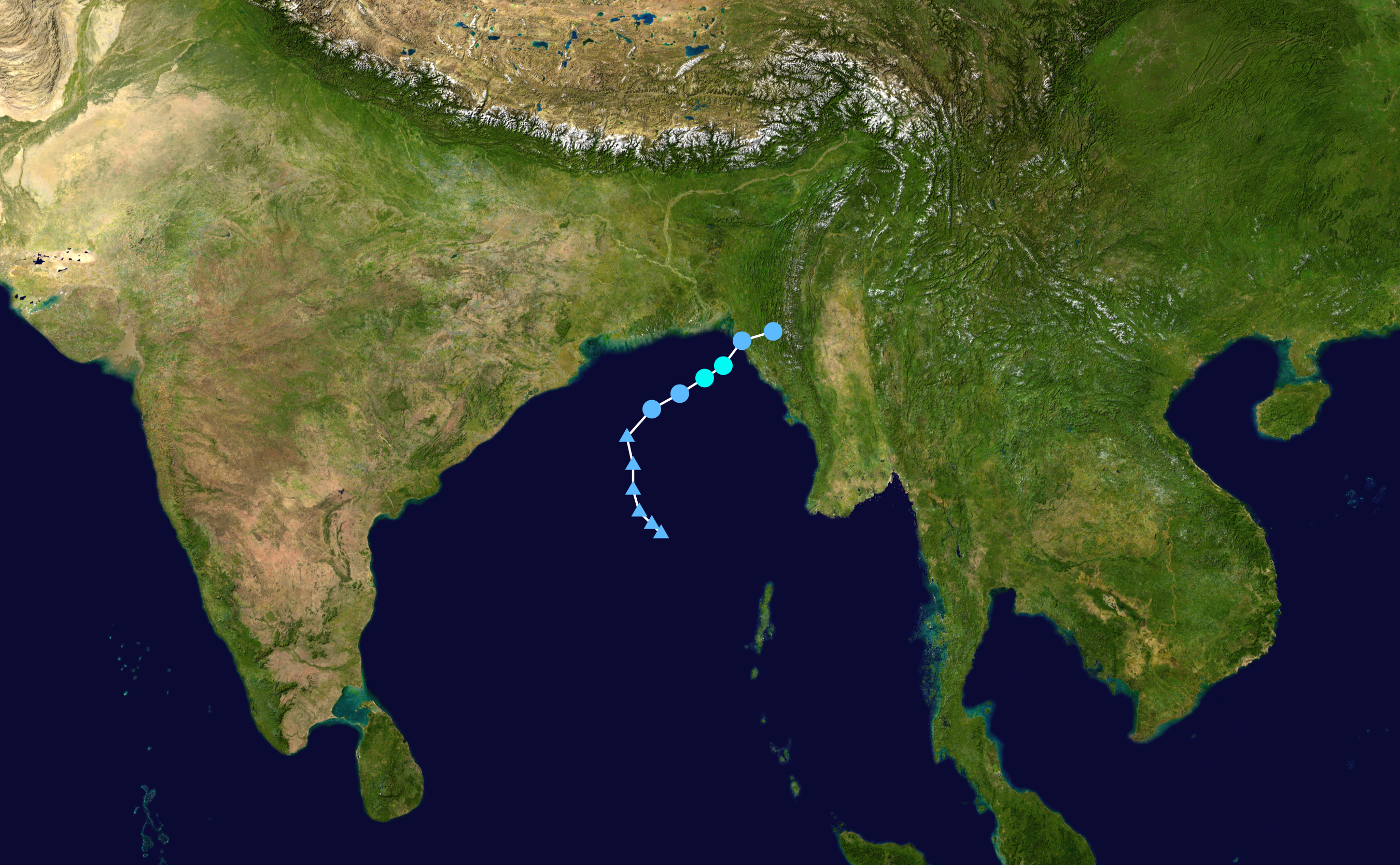
- Duration: October 19 – October 20
- Peak intensity: 55 km/h (35 mph) (3-min); 996 hPa (mbar)

A low-pressure area over the Bay of Bengal intensified, and was upgraded to Depression BOB 04 on October 19, 2011. The depression intensified slightly and the IMD upgraded the storm into a Deep Depression the same day. Later on the same day, the JTWC upgraded the system into a Tropical Storm. The system moved inland and weakened into a depression. The weakening process took place gradually as the storm moved more inland and dissipated into a remnant low.

Along the border between Myanmar and Bangladesh, torrential rains produced devastating flash floods. In the Magway region, roughly 2,000 homes were washed away by a "mass of water" and more than 6,000 remained flooded for days. Initial estimates placed damage from the storm at $1.64 million. At least 215 people were confirmed to have been killed with many more missing. Officials in the hard-hit town of Pakokku believed that the death toll would exceed 300 as residents searched for missing relatives days after the floods. Similar to what took place in the wake of Cyclone Nargis in 2008, journalists were warned by the Government not to take pictures of the disaster. Overall, it is the deadliest tropical cyclone in the North Indian Ocean since Cyclone Aila in 2009.

=== Cyclonic Storm Keila ===
- Cyclonic storm (IMD)
- Tropical storm (SSHWS)
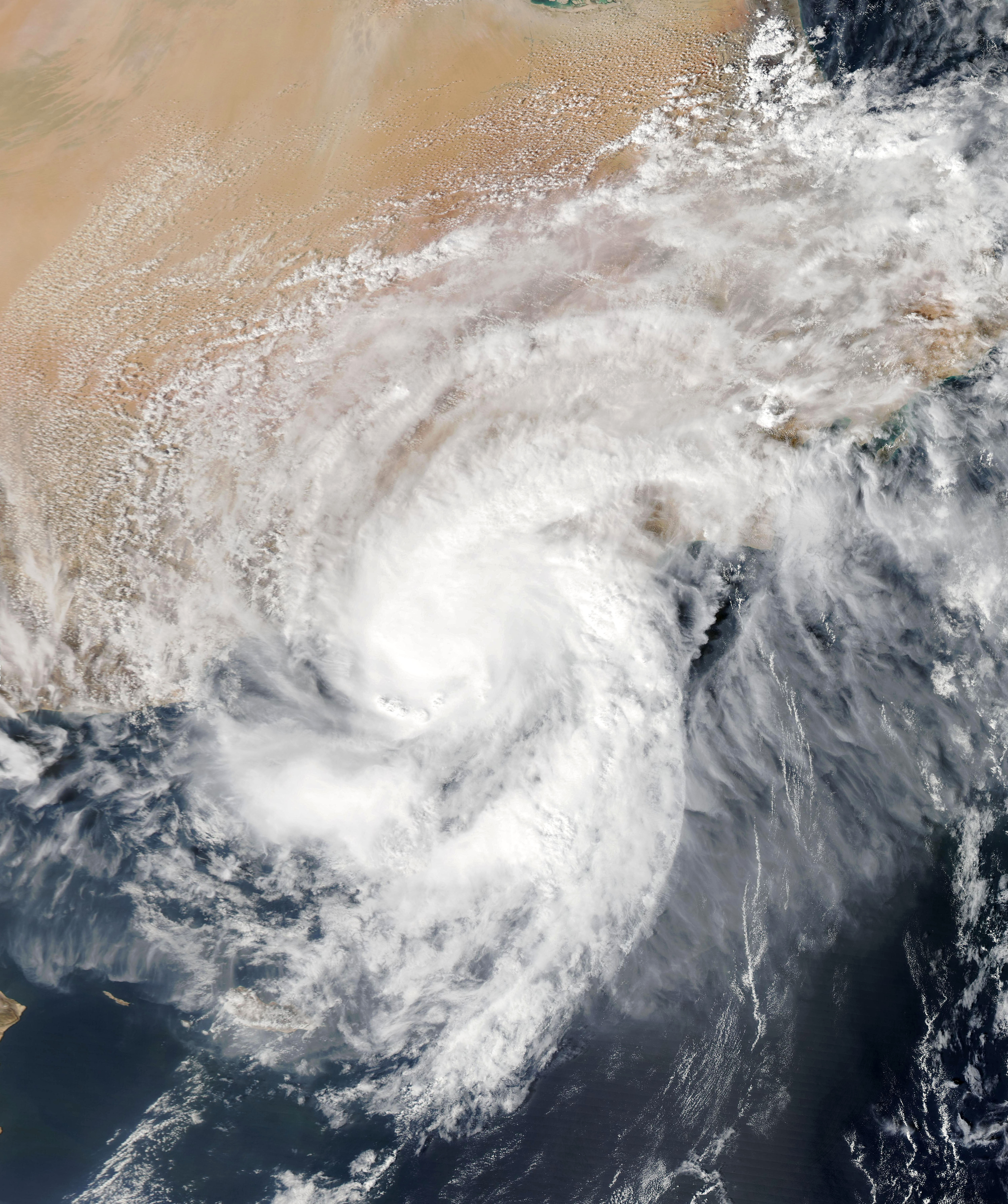
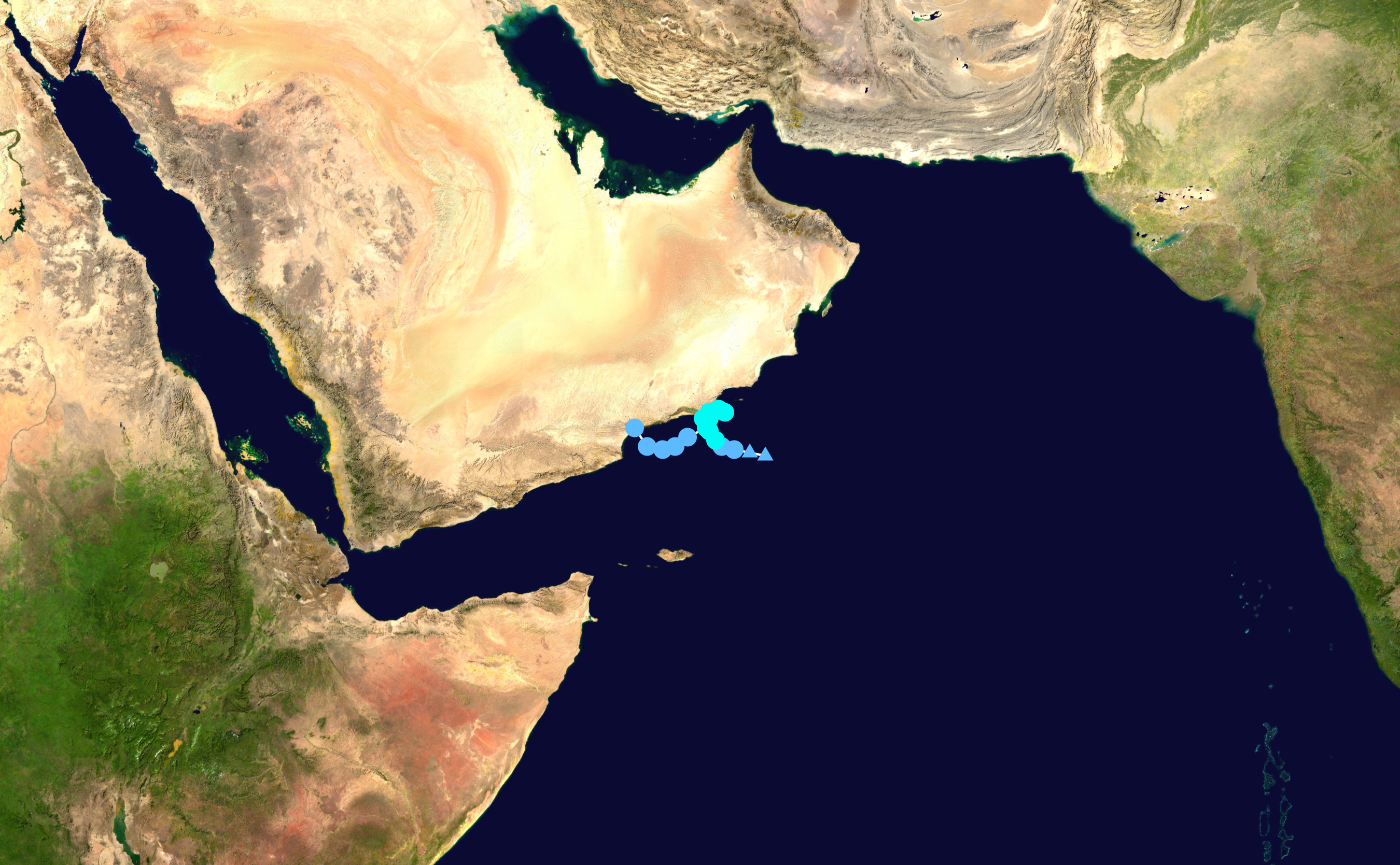
- Duration: October 29 – November 4
- Peak intensity: 65 km/h (40 mph) (3-min); 996 hPa (mbar)

Under the influence of a low-level trough, a low-pressure area formed over the Arabian Sea in late October. The system organized and the IMD designated the system Depression "ARB 02". The depression moved toward the Middle East during the next few days and intensified into a Deep Depression on November 1. In the morning of November 2, IMD upgraded the deep depression into a cyclonic storm and assigned it the name Keila. (Note: The name Keila (Dhivehi: ކޭލަ, [keːla]) was contributed by the Maldives and refers to the six-finger threadfin (Polydactylus sexfilis) in Dhivehi.)

Heavy rains from the storm in Oman were blamed on at least 14 deaths and 200 people are injured. High flood waters prompted the evacuation of hospitals in the capital city of Muscat. On November 3, JTWC downgraded the storm into a tropical depression. On the same day, JTWC issued their final advisories on this system. In the evening, IMD downgraded the storm into a deep depression. On November 4, IMD downgraded the depression into an area of low pressure, issuing its final advisory on the system.

=== Deep Depression ARB 03 ===
- Deep depression (IMD)
- Tropical storm (SSHWS)
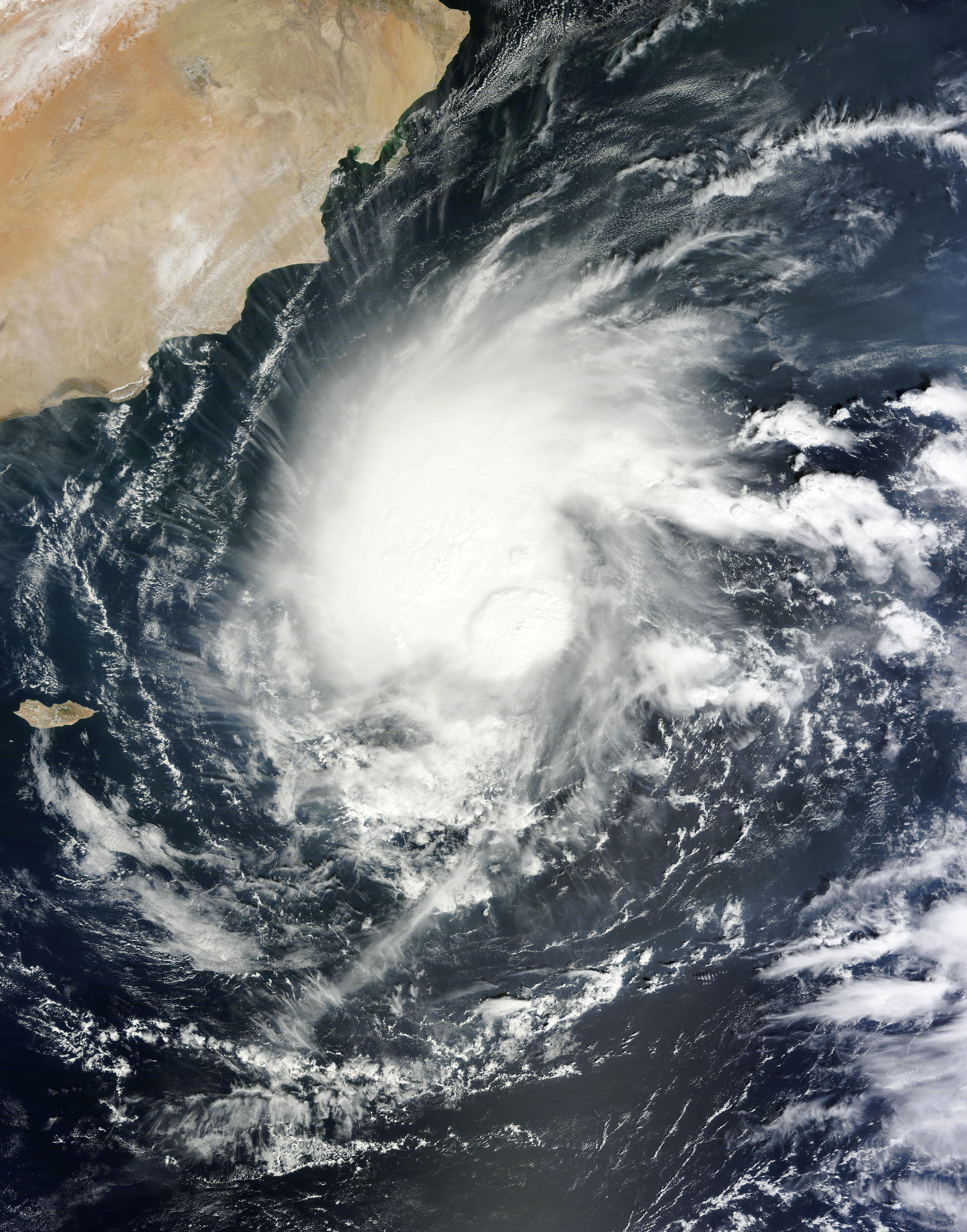
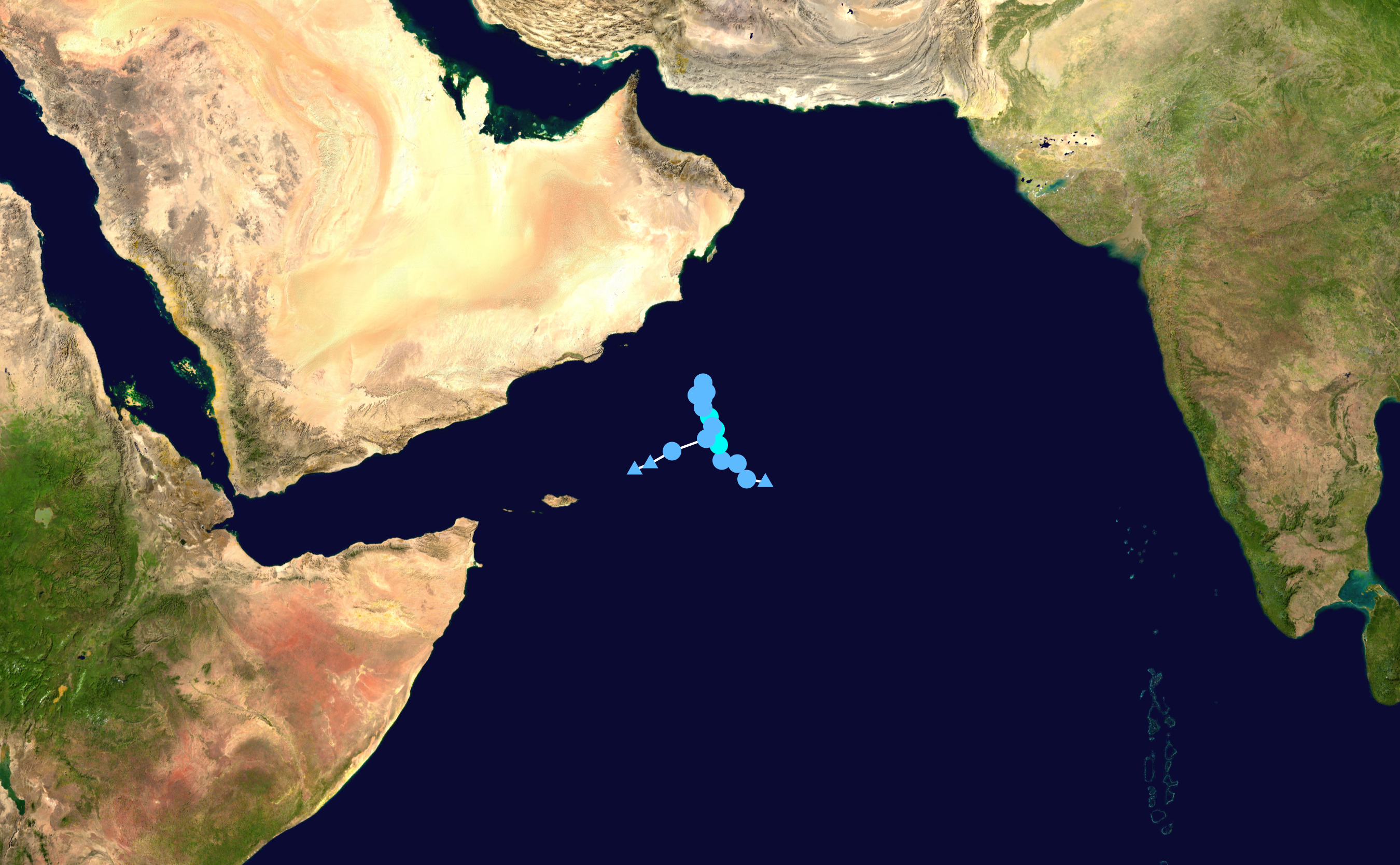
- Duration: November 6 – November 10
- Peak intensity: 55 km/h (35 mph) (3-min); 1000 hPa (mbar)

On November 6, the IMD upgraded a low-pressure area into a Depression, designating it ARB 03. The system was forecasted to intensify into a deep depression and move towards the Gulf of Aden in the next 72 hours. On the same day a TCFA was issued by the JTWC. The IMD upgraded the storm into a deep depression on November 8, and forecasted that it would intensify into a cyclonic storm within the next 24 hours which was followed by an upgrade to a tropical storm by JTWC. Under the influence of unfavorable conditions and proximity to land, the system weakened and JTWC issued its final warning. Soon the IMD downgraded the storm into a depression. On November 10, the storm dissipated into a low-pressure area.

=== Deep Depression ARB 04 ===
- Deep depression (IMD)
- Tropical storm (SSHWS)
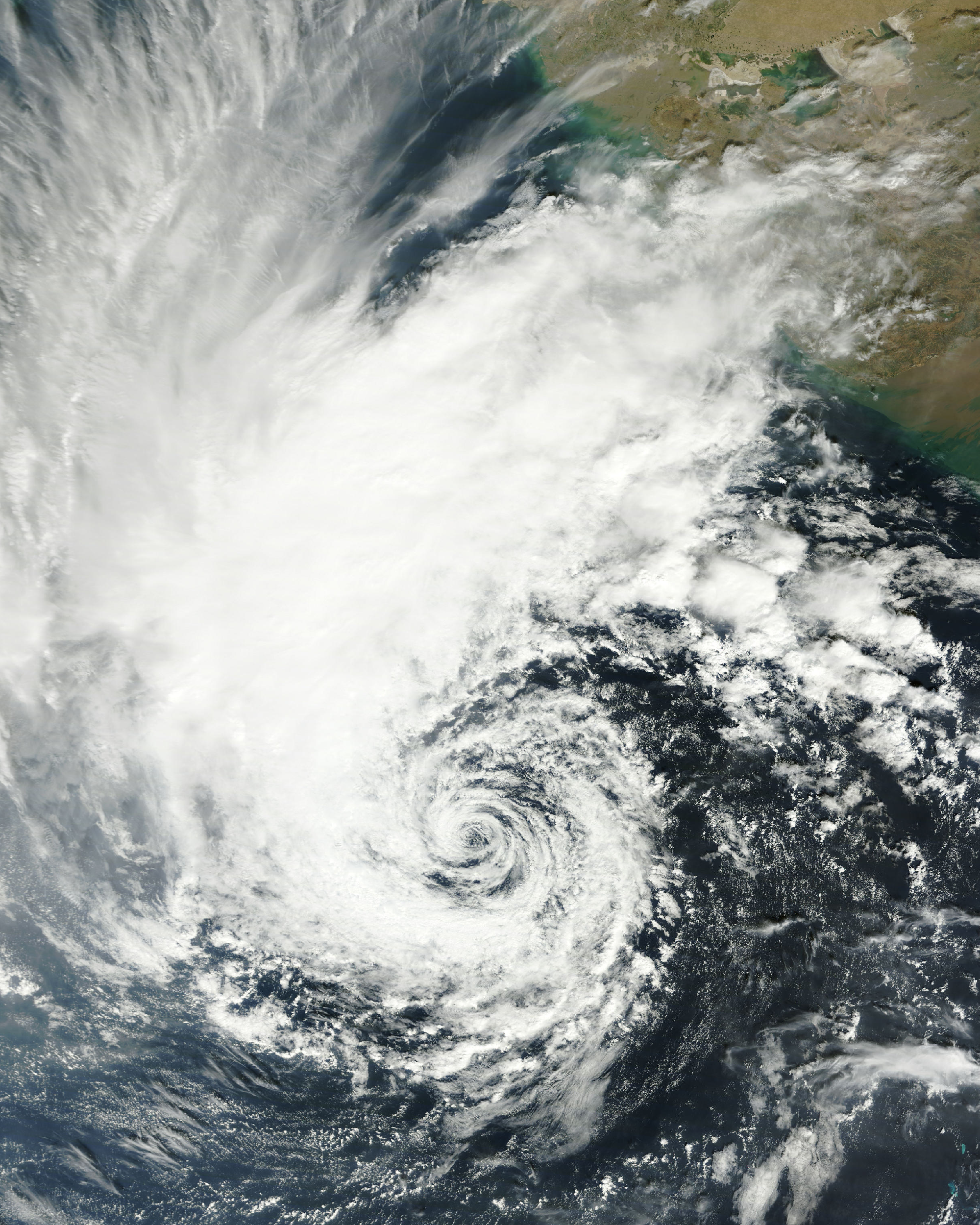
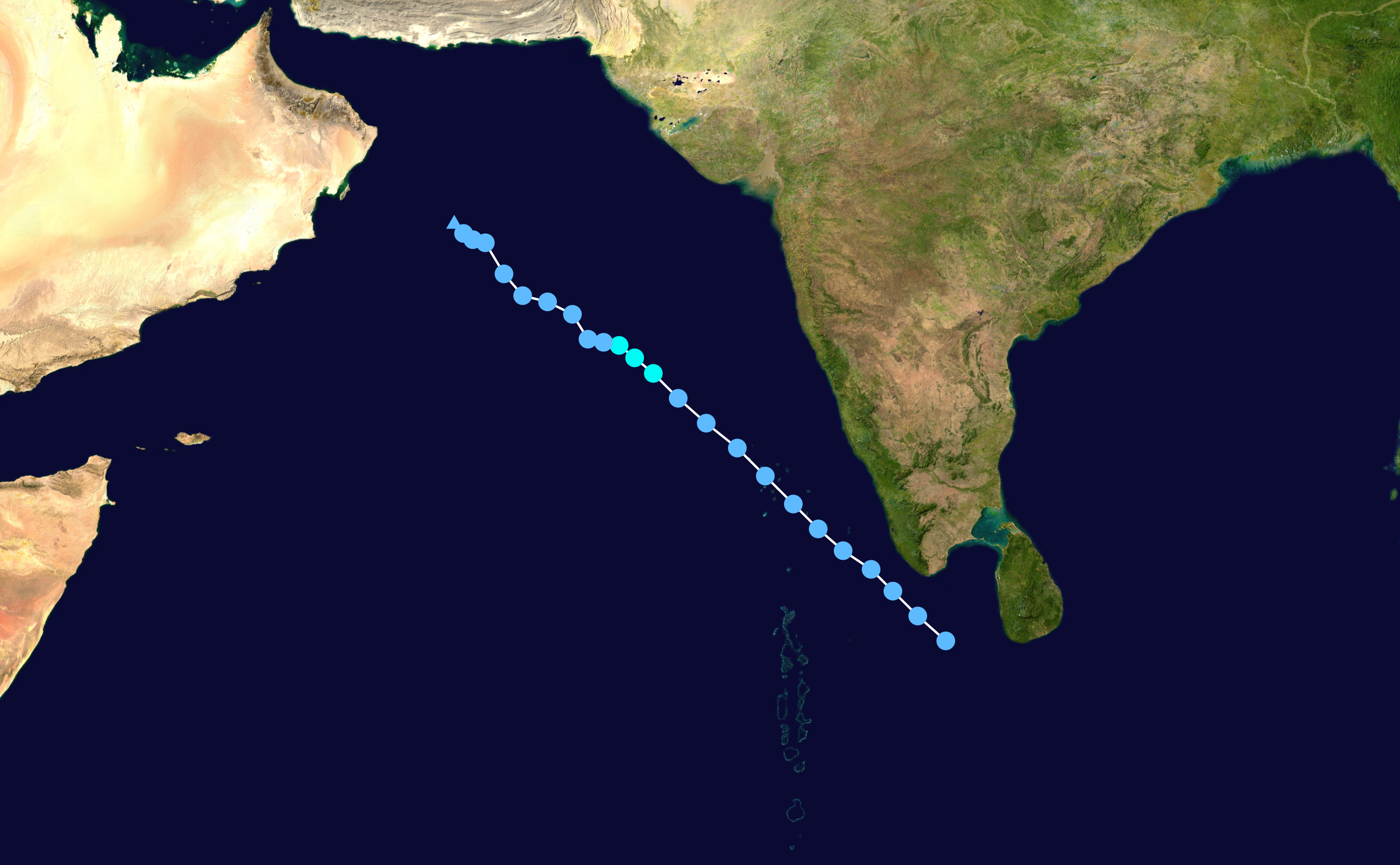
- Duration: November 26 – December 1
- Peak intensity: 55 km/h (35 mph) (3-min); 998 hPa (mbar)

On November 26, at 11:30 am IST, the IMD upgraded a low-pressure area south of India near Cape Comorin into a depression, giving it the designation ARB 04. The same day, the JTWC upgraded the storm from a tropical depression to a Tropical Storm and named it 05A. Extensive damage and loss of life was reported in Sri Lanka, where the storm was linked with heavy rains which caused 19 deaths and damage to 5,700 homes. The IMD upgraded the storm to a Deep Depression on November 28. Later on November 29 the IMD downgraded the storm into a depression. Following the downgrading of the storm by IMD, the JTWC on November 30 issued their final warning on 05A. The IMD reported on December 1 that the storm had weakened into a well-marked low-pressure area, and issued the final bulletin for the system.

=== Very Severe Cyclonic Storm Thane ===
- Very severe cyclonic storm (IMD)
- Category 2 tropical cyclone (SSHWS)
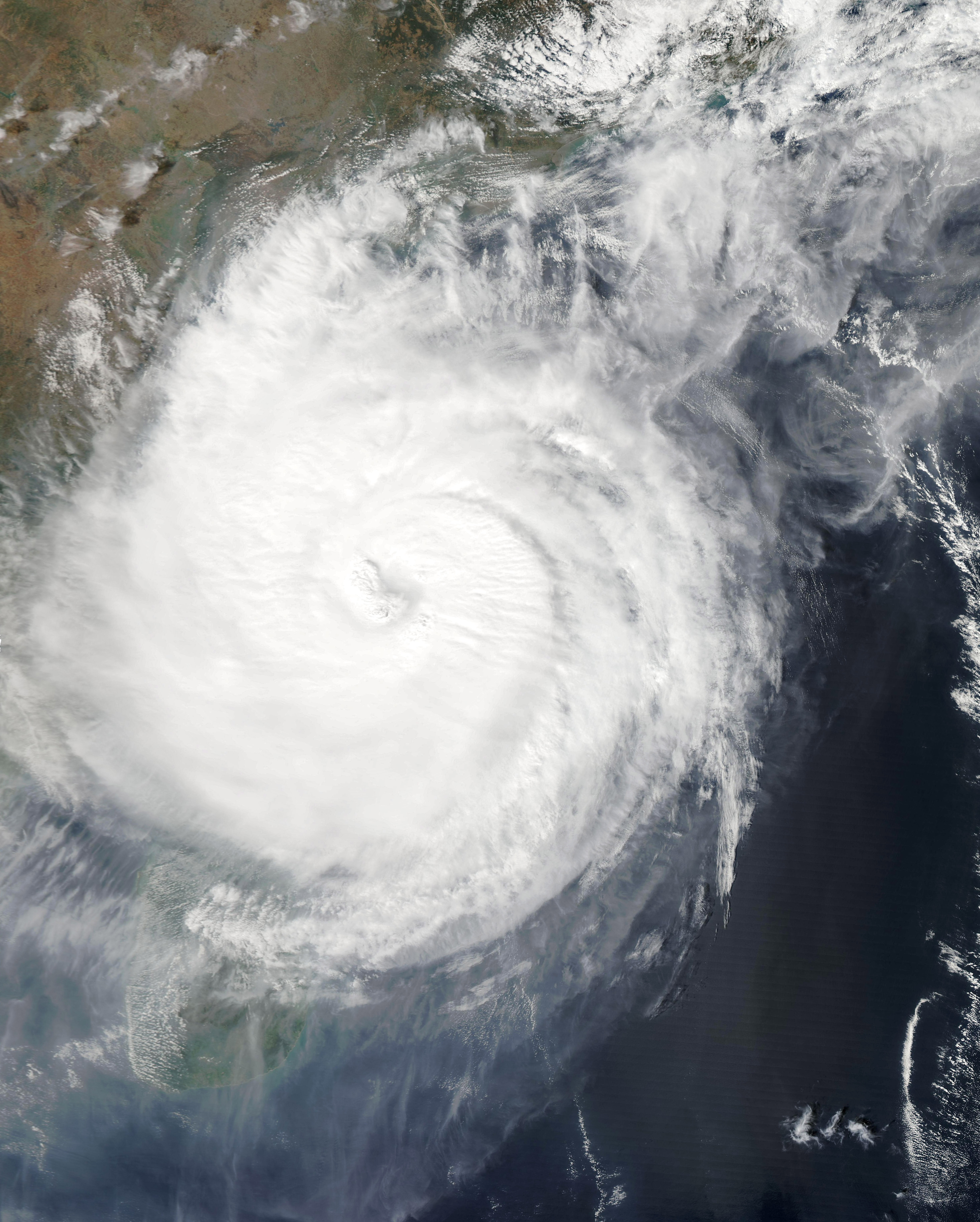
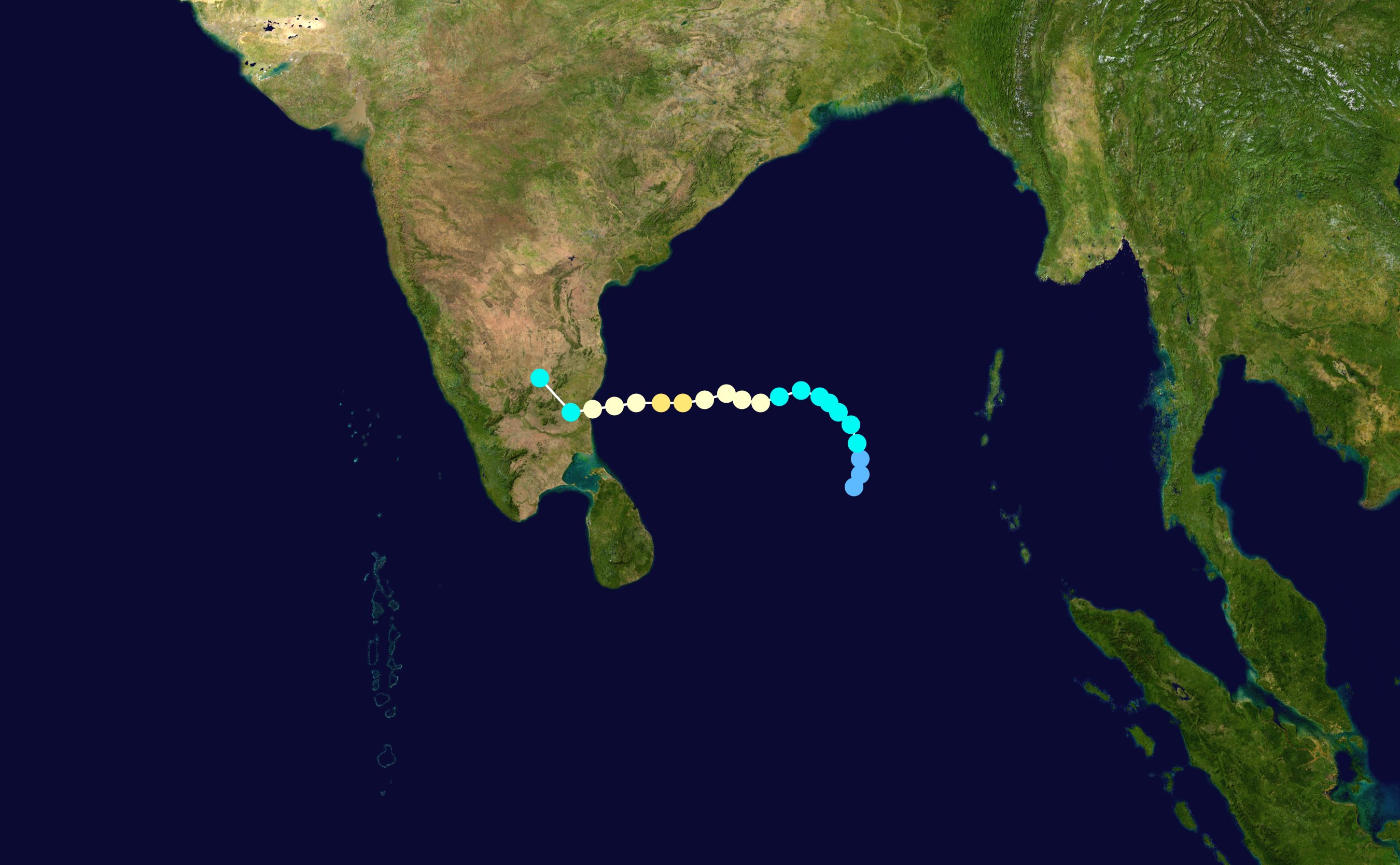
- Duration: December 25 – December 31
- Peak intensity: 140 km/h (85 mph) (3-min); 969 hPa (mbar)

On December 23, the JTWC reported that a tropical disturbance had developed within the monsoon trough about 1,545 km (960 mi) to the east of Medan in Indonesia. Convection surrounding the system had started to consolidate over a weak low level circulation centre, that was being fed by an enhanced westerly flow associated with the precursor system to Tropical Cyclone Benilde. Over the next couple of days the disturbance gradually developed further while moving towards the northwest, before the JTWC issued a TCFA on the system during December 25 before designating as Tropical Cyclone 06B later that day. The IMD also reported during December 25, that the disturbance had organised sufficiently to be declared Depression BOB 05, while it was located about 1,000 km (620 mi) to the southeast of Chennai, India. During the next day, the IMD reported that the depression had intensified into a Deep Depression, before later that day reporting that it had intensified into Cyclonic Storm Thane. (Note: The name Thane (Burmese: သိမ်း, [θèɪɰ̃]) was contributed by Myanmar and refers to the Eurasian sparrowhawk (Accipiter nisus) in Burmese.) As it was named, Thane started to turn towards the west under the influence of a subtropical ridge of high pressure before its development slowed as strong outflow and marginally favourable sea surface temperatures fought with persistent easterly vertical wind shear.

Early on December 28, the JTWC reported that Thane had become the equivalent to a category one hurricane on the SSHS before later that day the IMD reported that Thane had become the first Very Severe Cyclonic Storm of the season. During December 28, Thane continued to intensify, and developed a small pinhole eye, before the JTWC reported that Thane had attained its peak intensity early on December 29 with 1-minute sustained wind speeds of 165 km/h (105 mph). The IMD then followed suit and reported that the system had peaked as a Very Severe Cyclonic Storm with 3-minute sustained windspeeds of 140 km/h (85 mph). During the rest of that day, the system continued to move westwards and weakened slightly as it started to interact with land. Thane then made landfall as a very severe cyclonic storm early on December 30 on the north Tamil Nadu coast between Cuddalore and Pondicherry. After making landfall, Thane rapidly weaken into a depression before the JTWC issued their final advisory during December 30, while the IMD continued to monitor the remnants of Thane until the depression weakened into a well marked low-pressure area on December 31.

Overall, Thane was responsible for the deaths of 46 people with total damage to India, estimated at between 13 – 15 billion rupees (235 – 275 million USD). (Note: The damage total was originally reported in crore of rupees and was converted via the Oanda Corporation website using the rates for January 1, 2012.)

== Season effects ==
Name	Dates	Peak intensity			Areas affected	Damage (USD)	Deaths	Ref(s).
Name	Dates	Category	Wind speed	Pressure	Areas affected	Damage (USD)	Deaths	Ref(s).
BOB 01	February 2–3	Depression	45 km/h (30 mph)	1002	Sri Lanka	297 million	18	
ARB 01	June 11–12	Depression	45 km/h (30 mph)	996	India		None	
BOB 02	June 16–23	Deep Depression	65 km/h (40 mph)	978	India		6	
LAND 01	July 22–23	Depression	35 km/h (20 mph)	990	India		0	
BOB 03	September 22–23	Depression	45 km/h (30 mph)	995	India		42	
BOB 04	October 19–20	Deep Depression	55 km/h (35 mph)	1002	Bangladesh, Myanmar	1.64 million	215	
Keila	October 29 – November 4	Cyclonic Storm	65 km/h (40 mph)	996	Oman, Yemen	$80 million	14	
ARB 03	November 6 – November 10	Deep Depression	55 km/h (35 mph)	1000	No land areas affected.			
ARB 04	November 26 – December 1	Deep Depression	55 km/h (35 mph)	998	Lakshadweep, India, Sri Lanka	None	19	
Thane	December 25 – December 31	Very Severe Cyclonic Storm	140 km/h (85 mph)	969	India	235 million	46	
Season aggregates
10 systems	February 2 – December 30		140 km/h (85 mph)	969 hPa (28.61 inHg)		>$604 million	>360	

== See also ==
- List of North Indian cyclone seasons
- Tropical cyclones in 2011
- 2011 Atlantic hurricane season
- 2011 Pacific hurricane season
- 2011 Pacific typhoon season
- South-West Indian Ocean cyclone seasons: 2010–11 2011–12
- Australian region cyclone seasons: 2010–11 2011–12
- South Pacific cyclone seasons: 2010–11 2011–12
- South Atlantic tropical cyclone
