= Cyclone Thane =

North Indian cyclone in 2011

Very Severe Cyclonic Storm Thane
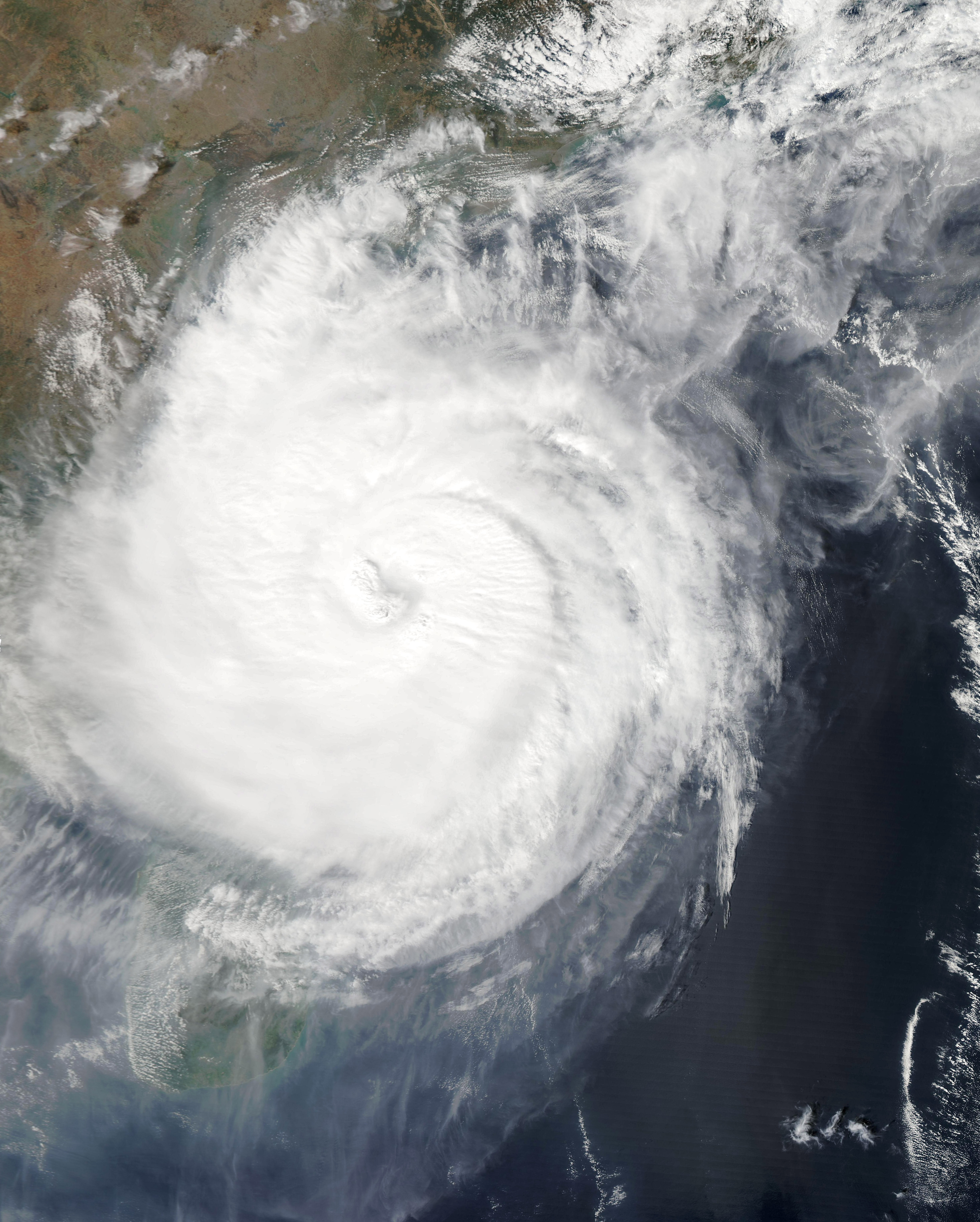
- Cyclone Thane near peak intensity on 29 December

Meteorological history
- Formed: 25 December 2011
- Dissipated: 31 December 2011

Very severe cyclonic storm
- 3-minute sustained (IMD)
- Highest winds: 140 km/h (85 mph)
- Lowest pressure: 969 hPa (mbar); 28.61 inHg

Category 2-equivalent tropical cyclone
- 1-minute sustained (SSHWS/JTWC)
- Highest winds: 165 km/h (105 mph)
- Lowest pressure: 956 hPa (mbar); 28.23 inHg

Overall effects
- Fatalities: 48
- Damage: $235 million (2011 USD)
- Areas affected: Southern India, Sri Lanka
- IBTrACS /
- Part of the 2011 North Indian Ocean cyclone season

Very Severe Cyclonic Storm Thane (Note: The name Thane (Burmese: သိမ်း, [θèɪɰ̃]) was contributed by Myanmar and refers to the Eurasian sparrowhawk (Accipiter nisus) in Burmese.) was the strongest tropical cyclone of 2011 within the Bay of Bengal. Thane initially developed as a tropical disturbance within the monsoon trough to the west of Indonesia. Over the next couple of days the disturbance gradually developed further while moving towards the northwest, and was declared a Depression during 25 December, before being named Cyclonic Storm Thane the next day. Thane started to turn towards the west under the influence of a subtropical ridge of high pressure before its development slowed during 27 December, as a strong outflow and marginally favourable sea surface temperatures fought with persistent vertical wind shear. After its development had slowed during 27 December, Thane became a Very Severe Cyclonic Storm during 28 December, before as it approached the Indian states of Tamil Nadu, it weakened slightly. Thane then made landfall early on 30 December, on the north Tamil Nadu coast between Cuddalore and Puducherry and rapidly weakened into a depression.

== Meteorological history ==
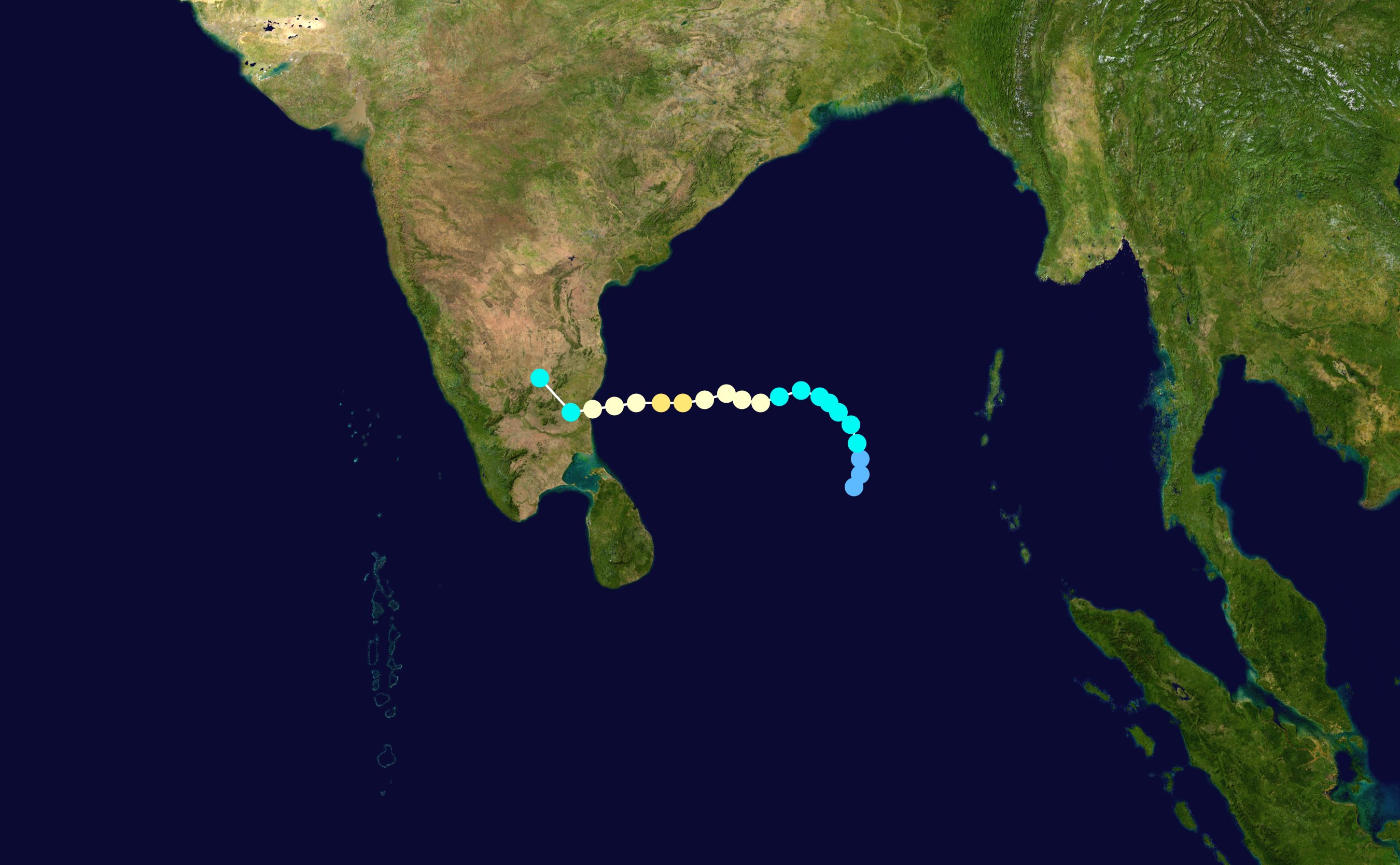
Map plotting the storm's track and intensity, according to the Saffir–Simpson scale Map key Saffir–Simpson scale Tropical depression (≤38 mph, ≤62 km/h) Tropical storm (39–73 mph, 63–118 km/h) Category 1 (74–95 mph, 119–153 km/h) Category 2 (96–110 mph, 154–177 km/h) Category 3 (111–129 mph, 178–208 km/h) Category 4 (130–156 mph, 209–251 km/h) Category 5 (≥157 mph, ≥252 km/h) Unknown Storm type Tropical cyclone Subtropical cyclone Extratropical cyclone, remnant low, tropical disturbance, or monsoon depression

On 23 December, the Joint Typhoon Warning Center (JTWC) reported that a tropical disturbance had developed within the monsoon trough about 1540 km (960 mi) to the east of Medan in Indonesia. Convection surrounding the system had started to consolidate over a weak low level circulation centre, that was being fed by an enhanced westerly flow associated with the precursor system to Tropical Cyclone Benilde. Over the next couple of days the disturbance gradually developed further while moving towards the northwest, with a Madden–Julian oscillation increasing the system boundary layers rotation. The JTWC then issued a Tropical Cyclone Formation Alert on the system during 25 December before designating as Tropical Cyclone 06B later that day as 1-minute wind speeds near the centre reached 65 km/h (40 mph) which is equivalent to a tropical storm. The India Meteorological Department (IMD) also reported during 25 December that the disturbance had organised sufficiently to be declared Depression BOB 05, while it was located about 1,000 km (620 mi) to the southeast of Chennai, India.

Early on 26 December, the IMD reported that the depression had intensified into a Deep Depression, before later that day reporting that it had intensified into a cyclonic storm and named it Thane. As it was named, Thane started to turn towards the west under the influence of a subtropical ridge of high pressure before its development slowed as strong outflow and marginally favourable sea surface temperatures fought with persistent easterly vertical wind shear. Early on 28 December, the JTWC reported that Thane had become equivalent to a category one hurricane on the Saffir–Simpson hurricane wind scale with 1-minute sustained windspeeds of 120 km/h (75 mph), while an eye feature had become visible on microwave imagery. Later that day the IMD reported that Thane had become the first Very Severe Cyclonic Storm of the season, with 3-minute sustained windspeeds of 120 km/h (75 mph). During 28 December, Thane continued to intensify, and developed a small pinhole eye of about 20 km (10 mi), before the JTWC reported that Thane had peaked early on 29 December with 1-minute sustained wind speeds of 165 km/h (105 mph). The IMD then followed suit and reported that the system had peaked as a Very Severe Cyclonic Storm with 3-minute sustained windspeeds of 140 km/h (85 mph). During the rest of that day, the system continued to move westwards and weakened slightly as it started to interact with land. Thane then made landfall as a borderline very severe cyclonic storm during 30 December on the north Tamil Nadu coast between Cuddalore and Puducherry. After it had made landfall, frictional forces made Thane rapidly weaken into a depression. As a result, the JTWC issued their final advisory during 30 December, while the IMD continued to monitor the remnants of Thane until the depression weakened into a well-marked low-pressure area early on 31 December.

== Preparations and impact ==
=== Tamil Nadu and Puducherry ===
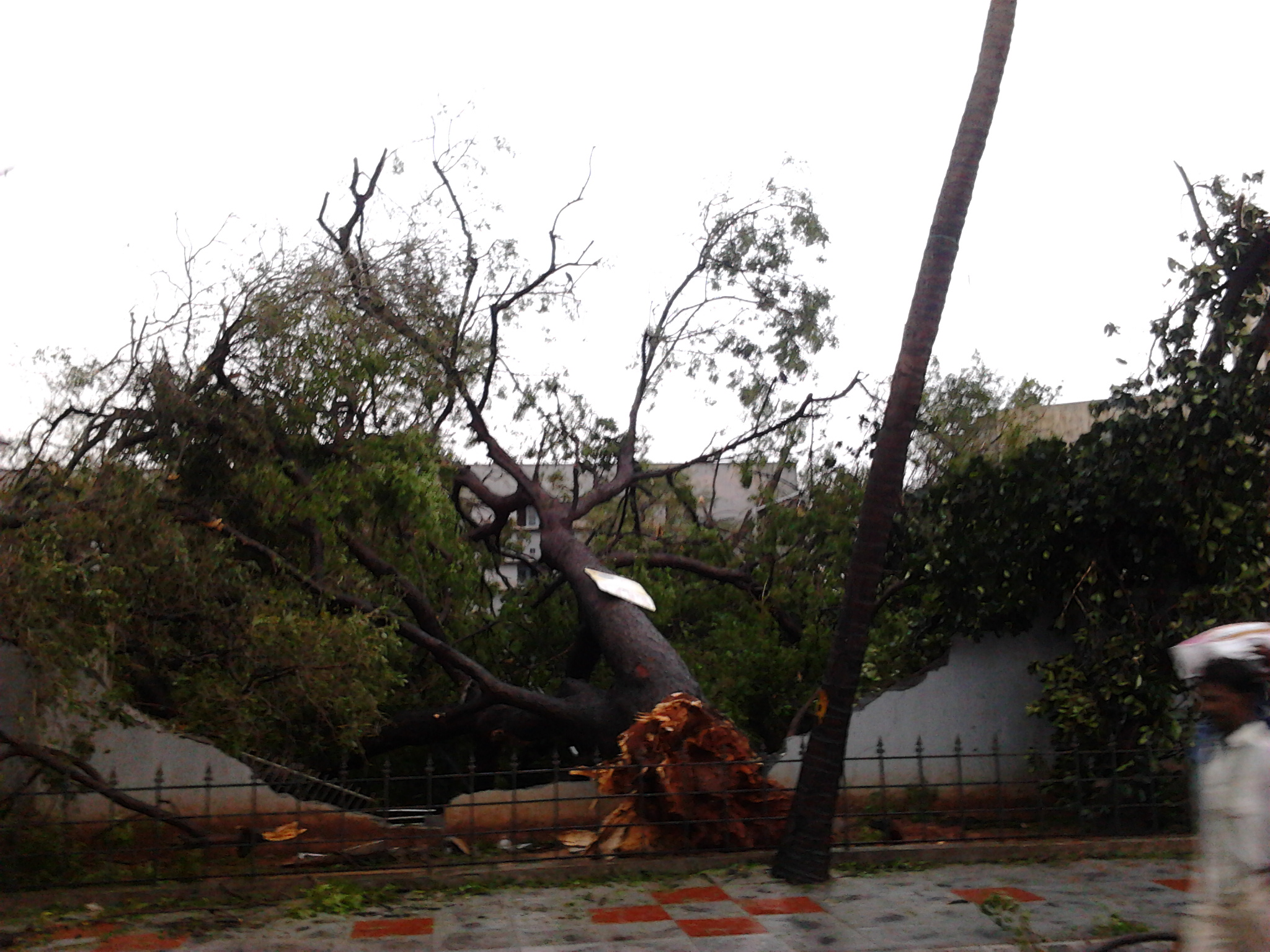
A tree uprooted by Thane in Puducherry

Forty eight people were killed by Cyclone Thane. About 9 deaths were reported in Puducherry and 39 people were reported dead in Cuddalore. Cuddalore and Puducherry were the worst affected by Thane. The storm made Cuddalore inaccessible by damaging road network and the National Disaster Response Force and fire and rescue services had difficulty in reaching the cyclone affected fishing hamlets.

Fishing activities had come to a complete halt in the cities of Chennai, Tiruvallur and Kanchipuram in the wake of the storm after the warnings by the weather department were received. About 10,000 fishing boats were moved to safer locations in all fishing hamlets in these areas. Chennai Corporation kept its four permanent relief centers (Basin Bridge, Chintadripet, Gopalapuram and Perambur Barracks Road) ready to accommodate people in case of evacuation due to torrential rains. People from low-lying areas were shifted to community centers with adequate arrangements of food and medical round the clock.

Tamil Nadu Chief Minister Jayalalithaa ordered the immediate release of ₹ 150 crore towards relief and restoration of infrastructure damaged by the Cyclone Thane. She also directed the District Collectors, Deputy Collectors and department Secretaries to assess the extent of the damage caused by Cyclone Thane.

=== Andhra Pradesh ===
700 fishermen were reported to be stranded near the Nizampatnam Bay area due to the rough sea conditions near the coast due to the cyclone. Owners had asked the government as well as the National Coast Guard for the fishermen's search and rescue after they could not communicate with them.

The former chief minister of Andhra Pradesh, Nallari Kiran Kumar Reddy instructed all the district collectors of the concerned districts of the state, mainly Nellore and Prakasam districts to take all precautionary measures in anticipation of the approaching storm. APSRTC was asked to keep sufficient buses in reserve in case of evacuation of the people. Officials reported that food stocks, drinking water, emergency power etc. were kept ready in reserves.

== See also ==
- Cyclone Vardah
- Cyclone Jal
- Cyclone Laila
