= Typhoon Songda (2011) =

Pacific typhoon in 2011

Typhoon Songda (Chedeng)
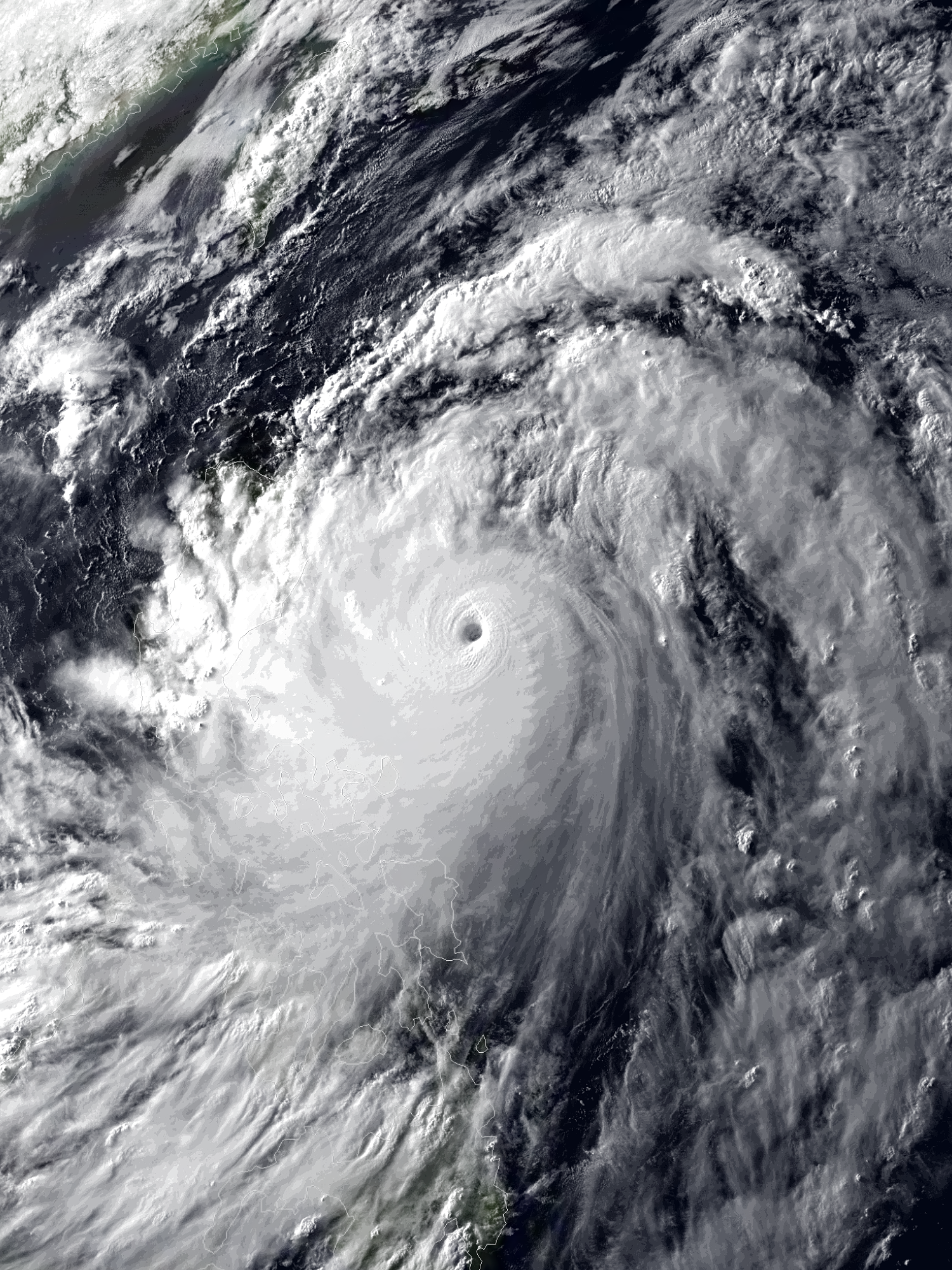
- Typhoon Songda at its peak intensity, nearing the northeastern Philippines on May 26

Meteorological history
- Formed: May 19, 2011
- Extratropical: May 29, 2011
- Dissipated: June 4, 2011

Violent typhoon
- 10-minute sustained (JMA)
- Highest winds: 195 km/h (120 mph)
- Lowest pressure: 920 hPa (mbar); 27.17 inHg

Category 5-equivalent super typhoon
- 1-minute sustained (SSHWS/JTWC)
- Highest winds: 260 km/h (160 mph)
- Lowest pressure: 918 hPa (mbar); 27.11 inHg

Overall effects
- Fatalities: 17
- Damage: $65.2 million
- Areas affected: Micronesia, Philippines, Ryukyu Islands, Taiwan, Japan
- IBTrACS
- Part of the 2011 Pacific typhoon season

Typhoon Songda, (Note: The name Songda (Vietnamese: Sông Đà, [səwŋ͡m˧˧ ʔɗaː˨˩]) was contributed by Vietnam and refers to the Black River in northwestern Vietnam.) known in the Philippines as Typhoon Chedeng, was the strongest tropical cyclone worldwide in 2011. It caused moderate damage in the Philippines when it paralleled the country to the east as a Category 5–equivalent super typhoon; it later affected Taiwan and Japan as a weakening system. The fourth tropical depression, second named storm and the first super typhoon of the 2011 Pacific typhoon season, Songda formed from a non-tropical low that was embedded from the Intertropical Convergence Zone on May 17. An area of low-pressure subsequently formed and became organized for the JTWC to issue a TCFA on the system and the JMA to issue advisories, before both agencies declared it a tropical storm, earning the name Songda. Under favorable conditions, Songda slowly intensified as it entered the Philippine Area of Responsibility, with the PAGASA naming it Chedeng on May 23. On the next day, the three agencies declared the system a typhoon before rapidly intensifying to a super typhoon over the Philippine Sea. As it entered an unfavorable environment for further strengthening, Songda slowly weakened as it passed near Taiwan, before becoming extratropical near Japan. The remnants of the system slowly moved to the northeast, before absorbing to another extratropical cyclone to the south of Alaska.

As Songda skirted the eastern Philippines, the typhoon caused four deaths and caused flash floods and significant landslides across the affected part of the country; however, the total damages in the country are unknown. Despite the storm becoming extratropical as it passed Japan, it caused heavy rains which led to flash floods and there were also reports of landslides. Thirteen individuals were killed for unknown reasons. In total, Songda was blamed for 17 deaths and caused over ¥7.06 billion ($65.156 million) worth of damages across its path.

== Meteorological history ==
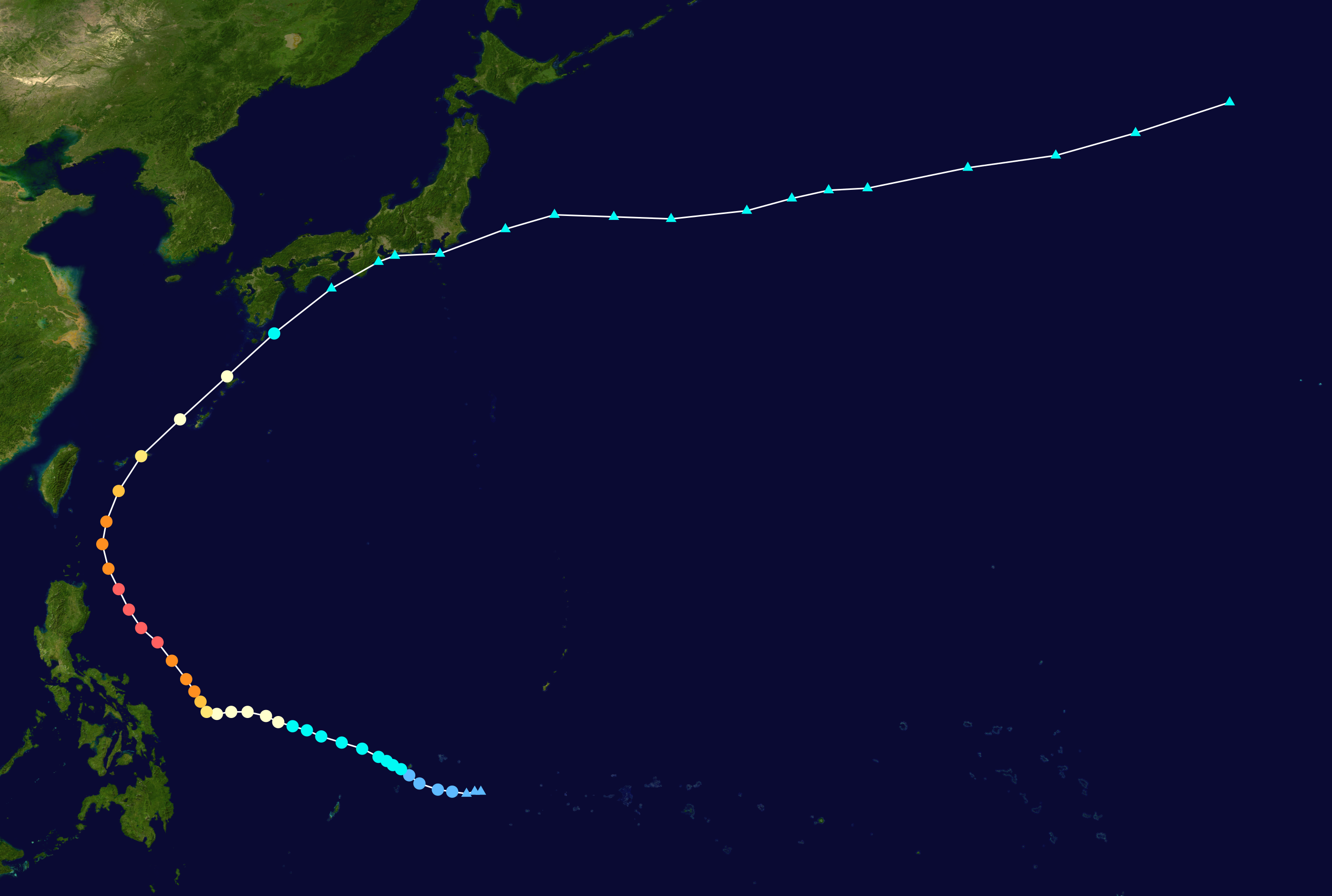
Map plotting the storm's track and intensity, according to the Saffir–Simpson scale Map key Saffir–Simpson scale Tropical depression (≤38 mph, ≤62 km/h) Tropical storm (39–73 mph, 63–118 km/h) Category 1 (74–95 mph, 119–153 km/h) Category 2 (96–110 mph, 154–177 km/h) Category 3 (111–129 mph, 178–208 km/h) Category 4 (130–156 mph, 209–251 km/h) Category 5 (≥157 mph, ≥252 km/h) Unknown Storm type Tropical cyclone Subtropical cyclone Extratropical cyclone, remnant low, tropical disturbance, or monsoon depression

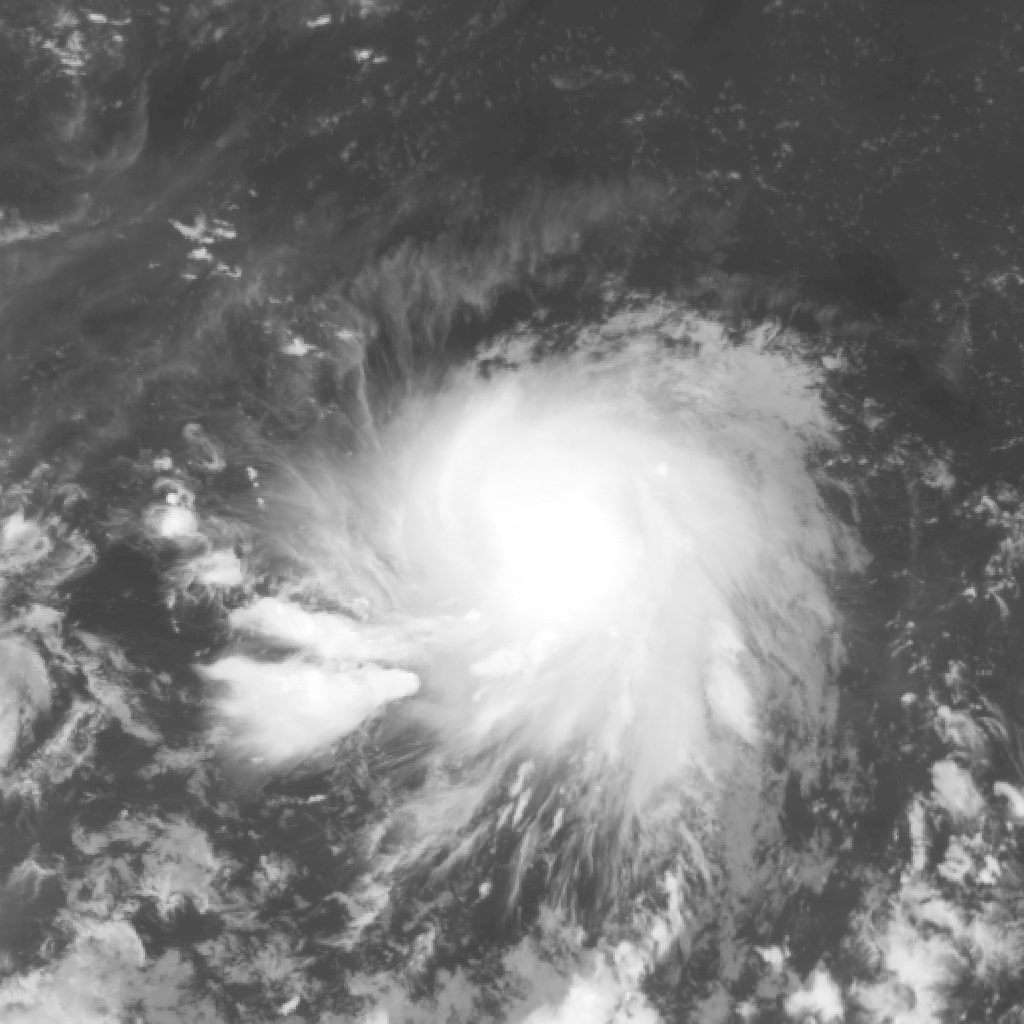
Tropical Storm Songda on May 22

On May 17, a weak non-tropical system formed within the Intertropical Convergence Zone (ITCZ), to the east of Palau. Two days later, the system coalesced to an area of low pressure, while located to the southeast of Yap. Under the influence of a subtropical ridge, the small system rapidly became organized, with the JMA issuing its first advisory as a minor tropical depression on the same day. The JTWC followed suit, issuing its first bulletin on the system as Tropical Depression 04W, the next day. At this time, the depression was located in a favorable environment for further development. Later that day, the JTWC announced that the depression became a tropical storm; however, this was underestimated that the agency downgraded the system to a tropical depression, based from the observations from Yap Island. On the morning of May 21, both the JMA and the JTWC reported in their bulletins that the depression finally strengthened to a tropical storm, with the former naming it Songda. On May 23, the storm entered the Philippine Area of Responsibility (PAR), with the PAGASA issuing their first bulletin as Tropical Storm Chedeng, while located, approximately 880 km to the east of Guiuan, Eastern Samar. At 12:00 UTC on the next day, the JTWC reported that Songda became a typhoon, which was followed by the JMA, 12 hours later. On the same day, the PAGASA stated that Chedeng became a typhoon, to the east of Eastern Samar. Due to the warm waters around the storm, the typhoon underwent rapid intensification, becoming a super typhoon on the next day.

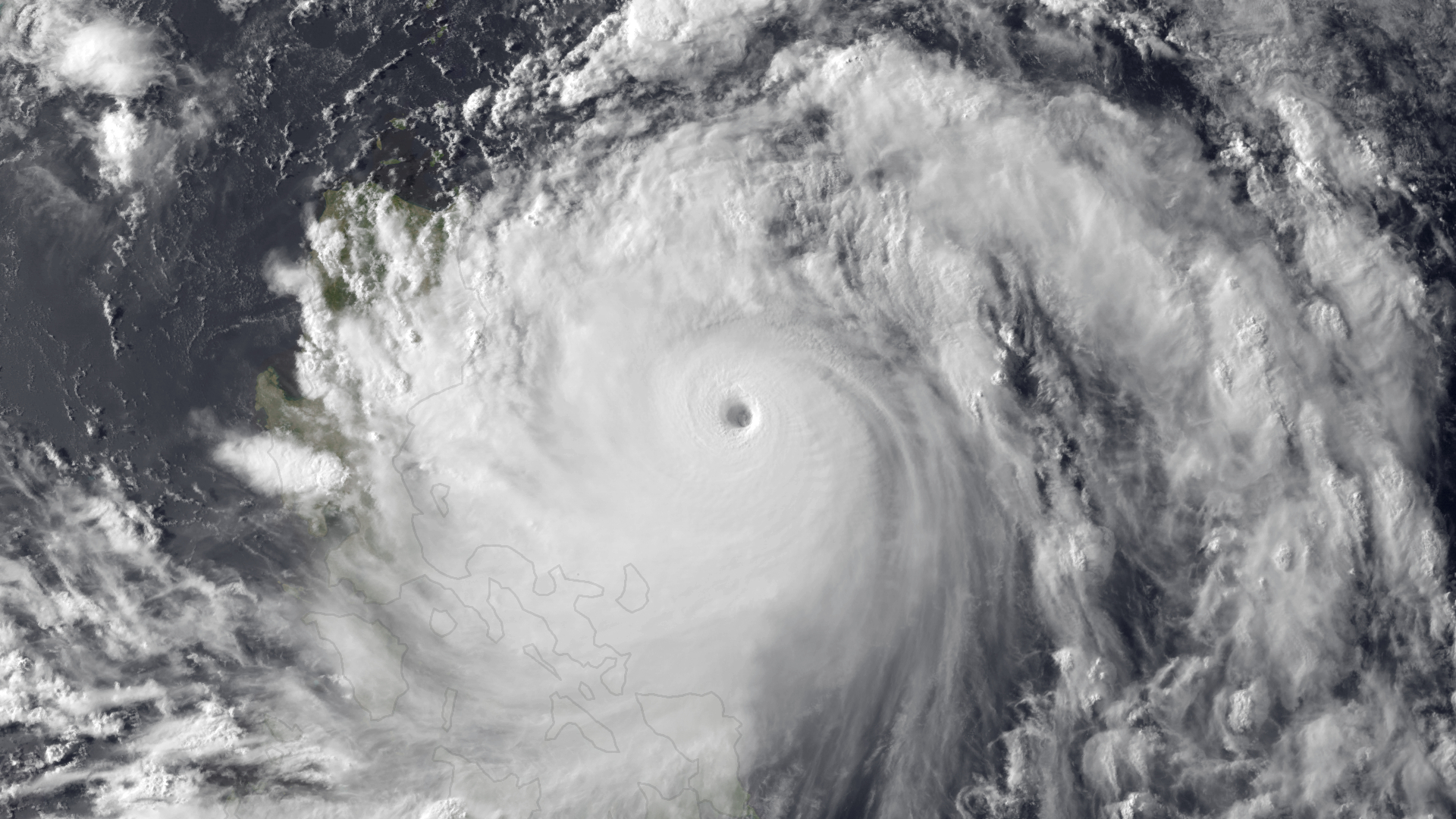
Super Typhoon Songda near its peak intensity on May 26

It further strengthened, peaking with 1-minute sustained winds of 195 km/h (120 mph) and with a minimum central pressure of 920 hPa (mbar; 27.17 inHg) on the next day, May 27. Afterwards, the violent super typhoon began to weaken, possibly due to the eyewall replacement cycle; however, it continued to weaken as it passed to the east of Taiwan, before exiting the PAR on May 28, shortly before striking the southern tip of Japan on May 29. It soon became extratropical, with the JMA and JTWC issuing their final advisories on the same day. The extratropical remnants of Songda were last noted on June 4, as it was absorbed by another extratropical cyclone to the south of Alaska.

== Preparations and impact ==
Songda caused 17 deaths across the Philippine archipelago and Japan, and caused ¥7.06 billion ($ 65.156 million) worth of damages.

=== Philippines ===
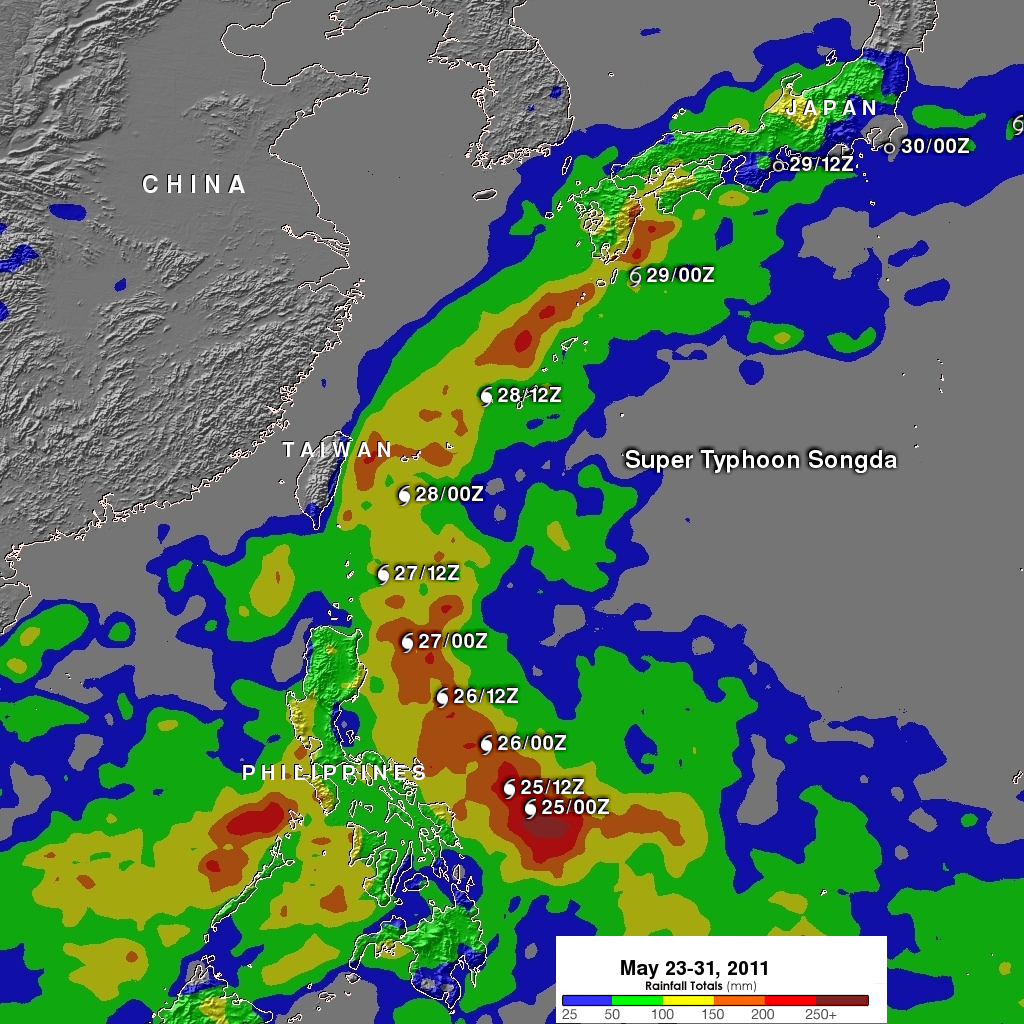
TMPA rainfall totals from May 23 to 31, 2011

As the tropical storm entered the area of responsibility of the country, the NDRRMC issued an advisory for the low-lying areas of the country to be aware of the flash floods and possible landslides as the storm influences the southwest monsoon. As Chedeng nears the country, they raised a Public Storm Warning Signal, early on May 24 over the eastern portion of Visayas, which would later be expanded to Bicol Region, some parts of Calabarzon, eastern Central Luzon and the eastern portion of the Northern Luzon, including Batanes and the Babuyan Group of Islands.

As forecasted, Songda brought widespread floods and various landslides across the region, forcing over 313,000 people to flee temporarily. A gold mine tunnel was washed away by a landslide, killing three miners. The NDRRMC reported that two more individuals are killed due to drowning. However, the total damages in the country are unknown.

=== Taiwan and eastern China ===
The country of Taiwan issued a warning for ships for gales due to Songda. They also warned the people, to be ready in case of heavy flooding as the typhoon passes to the east of the island country. However, the data after the typhoon in the country are unknown.

On Thursday, Chinese meteorological authorities issued a warning for the super typhoon, which is moving close to the southern coast of the country, causing powerful winds and waves. The damages and fatalities, if any, are unknown.

=== Japan ===
The East Japan Railway Co. stopped the train services on the Tohoku line, causing long queues for taxis outside of the train stations. The 11th Regional Coast Guard Headquarters in Okinawa Prefecture was deployed, in case of marine emergencies due to the storm approaching the country. Over 400,000 individuals were also evacuated in safe areas for the extratropical storm. The individuals from the Tokyo Electric Power Company, assessing the damages from the Fukushima Daiichi Nuclear Power Station Accident were halted due to the storm.

A total of 67 people were injured due to Songda, despite the system being extratropical. The extratropical system also caused heavy flooding and some landslides across southern Japan. A person was killed in Ehime Prefecture due to drowning. Strong waves were shown in TV footages in Miyako, and some roads were turned into large rivers. In the areas affected by the recent Tohoku earthquake and tsunami on March of the same year, it caused the largest inundation and flooding, before Typhoon Roke in mid-September of the same year. The extratropical storm set some records on the country; including the highest maximum instantaneous wind speed, which was recorded at Okinawa Prefecture, and the record heavy rain at the northern part of Yakushima in Kagoshima Prefecture, and the 24-hour precipitation on Yakushima, with 120 mm and 457.7 mm, respectively. Some anxieties were also caused by higher radioactive water levels. Tepco said it would carefully track the water levels in reactors to ensure that rainwater does not leak in. Tepco said that water rose by almost 8 inches in 24 hours in the basement of one of the six reactor constructions—almost 20 feet.
