= Tropical cyclones in 2011 =

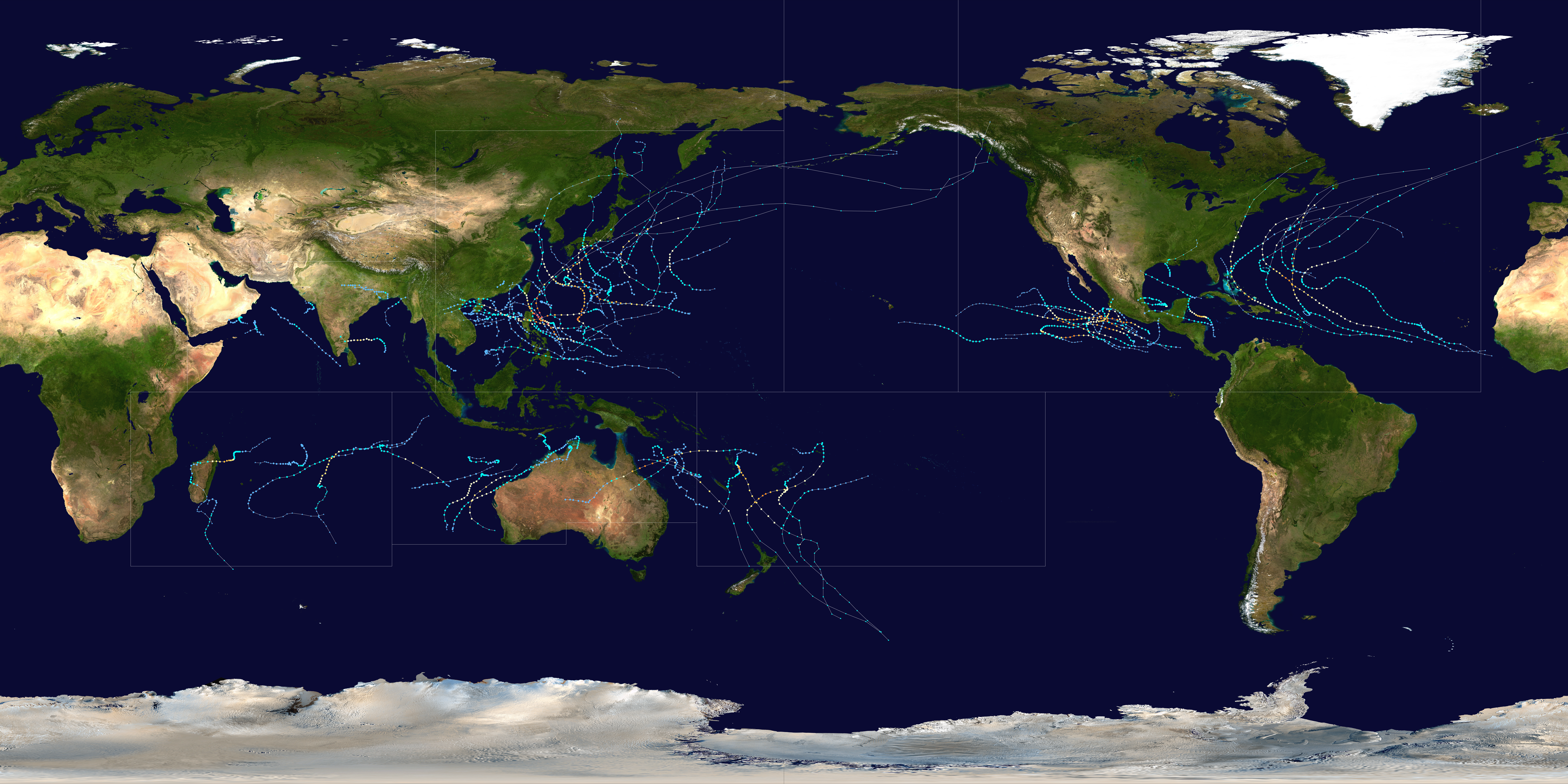
- Year summary map

Year boundaries
- First system: 03
- Formed: January 2, 2011
- Last system: Benilde
- Dissipated: January 4, 2012

Strongest system
- Name: Songda
- Lowest pressure: 920 mbar (hPa); 27.17 inHg

Longest lasting system
- Name: Philippe
- Duration: 14 days

Year statistics
- Total systems: 130
- Named systems: 75
- Total fatalities: 3,686 total
- Total damage: $30.57 billion (2011 USD)
Related articles
- 2011 Atlantic hurricane season
- 2011 Pacific hurricane season
- 2011 Pacific typhoon season
- 2011 North Indian Ocean cyclone season
- 2010–11 South-West Indian Ocean cyclone season
- 2011–12 South-West Indian Ocean cyclone season
- 2010–11 Australian region cyclone season
- 2011–12 Australian region cyclone season
- 2010–11 South Pacific cyclone season
- 2011–12 South Pacific cyclone season

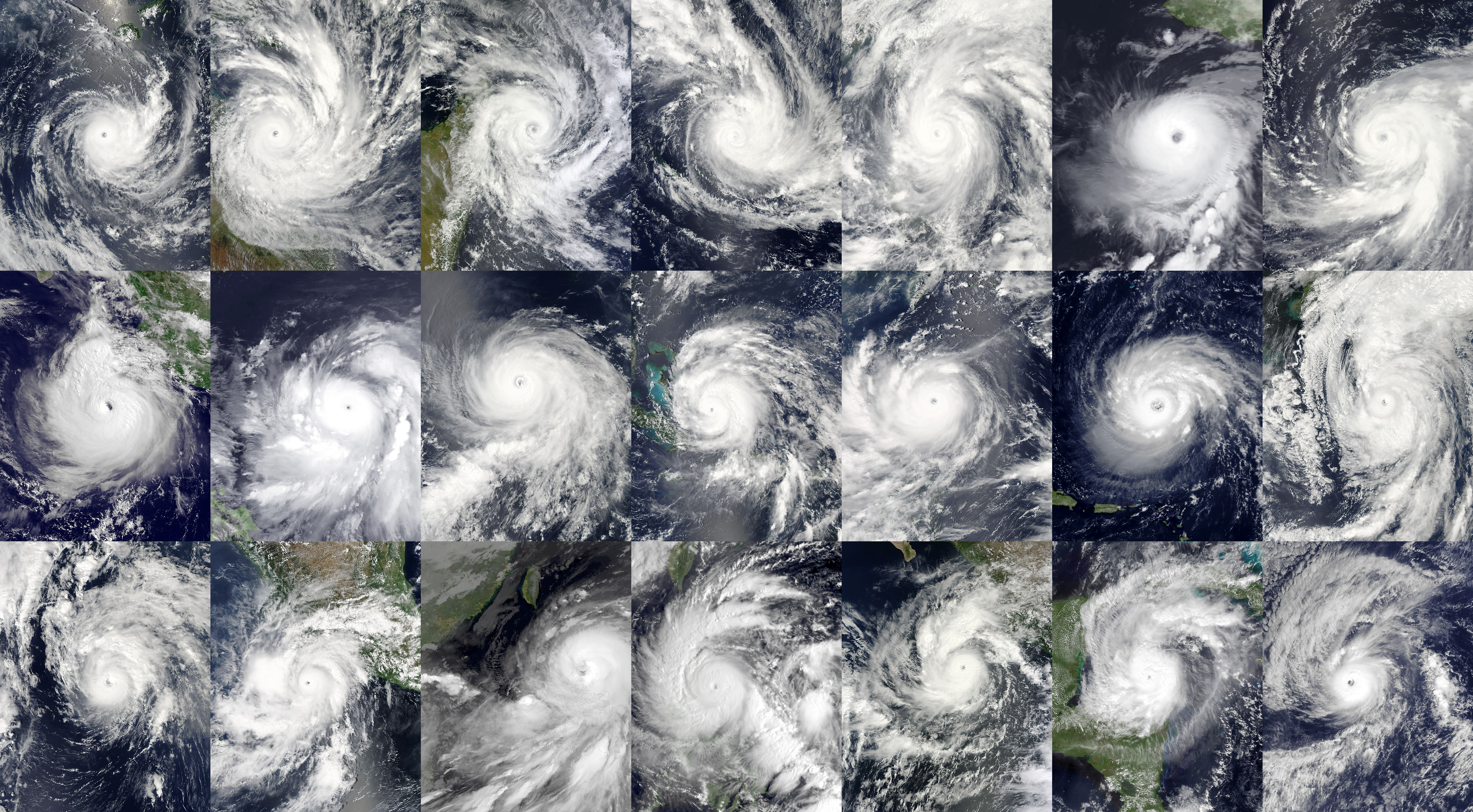
Satellite photos of the 21 tropical cyclones worldwide that reached at least Category 3 on the Saffir–Simpson scale during 2011, from Wilma in January to Kenneth in November. Among them, Songda (third-to-last image in the first row) was the most intense, with a minimum central pressure of 920 hPa.

During 2011, tropical cyclones formed within seven different tropical cyclone basins, located within various parts of the Atlantic, Pacific and Indian Oceans. The strongest tropical cyclone of the year was Typhoon Songda, with a minimum central pressure of 920 hPa (mbar). The costliest tropical cyclone of the year was Hurricane Irene, which caused $14.2 billion worth of damage. The deadliest tropical cyclone of the year was Severe Tropical Storm Washi, which killed 2,546 people. During the year, a total of 130 tropical cyclones had formed this year to date. 75 tropical cyclones had been named by either a Regional Specialized Meteorological Center (RSMC) or a Tropical Cyclone Warning Center (TCWC). Thirty-nine of these named systems eventually intensified into hurricane-equivalent tropical cyclones.

The most active basin in the year was the Western Pacific, which documented 21 named storms. North Atlantic basin documented 19 named storms, continuing the consecutive third-most active season trends from the previous year, due to the 2010–12 La Niña event. Conversely, the Eastern Pacific basin featured slightly more activity than the previous season, with 11 named storms. The least active basin in the year was the North Indian Ocean basin which documented only 2 named storms, the lowest since the 1993 season. Activity across the Southern Hemisphere were almost evenly spread, with the South-West Indian Ocean basin recording 10 tropical cyclones, the Australian region recording 17 tropical cyclones, and the South Pacific basin also recording 10 tropical cyclones, respectively. Twenty-one Category 3 tropical cyclones formed in the year, including three Category 5 tropical cyclones. The accumulated cyclone energy (ACE) index for the 2011 (seven basins combined), as calculated by Colorado State University was 573.8 units.

Tropical cyclones are primarily monitored by a group of ten warning centers, which have been designated as a Regional Specialized Meteorological Centre (RSMC) or a Tropical Cyclone Warning Center (TCWC) by the World Meteorological Organization. These are the United States National Hurricane Center (NHC) and Central Pacific Hurricane Center, the Japan Meteorological Agency (JMA), the Indian Meteorological Department (IMD), Météo-France (MFR), Indonesia's Badan Meteorologi, Klimatologi, dan Geofisika, the Australian Bureau of Meteorology (BOM), Papua New Guinea's National Weather Service, the Fiji Meteorological Service (FMS) as well as New Zealand's MetService. Other notable warning centers include the Philippine Atmospheric, Geophysical, and Astronomical Services Administration (PAGASA), the United States Joint Typhoon Warning Center (JTWC), and the Brazilian Navy Hydrographic Center(BNHC).

== Global atmospheric and hydrological conditions ==
The strong La Niña from the previous year continued into 2011, whereby it peaked in January. Afterwards, it began weakening considerably, to the point where in May it was determined that a transition to neutral conditions took place. By the end of Summer, this neutral state continued to persist, although there were still remnants of the La Niña evident. Due to continued cooling of the Pacific, it was determined that the La Niña redeveloped, albeit in a weak state, which would then continue into the next year.

== Systems ==
=== January ===
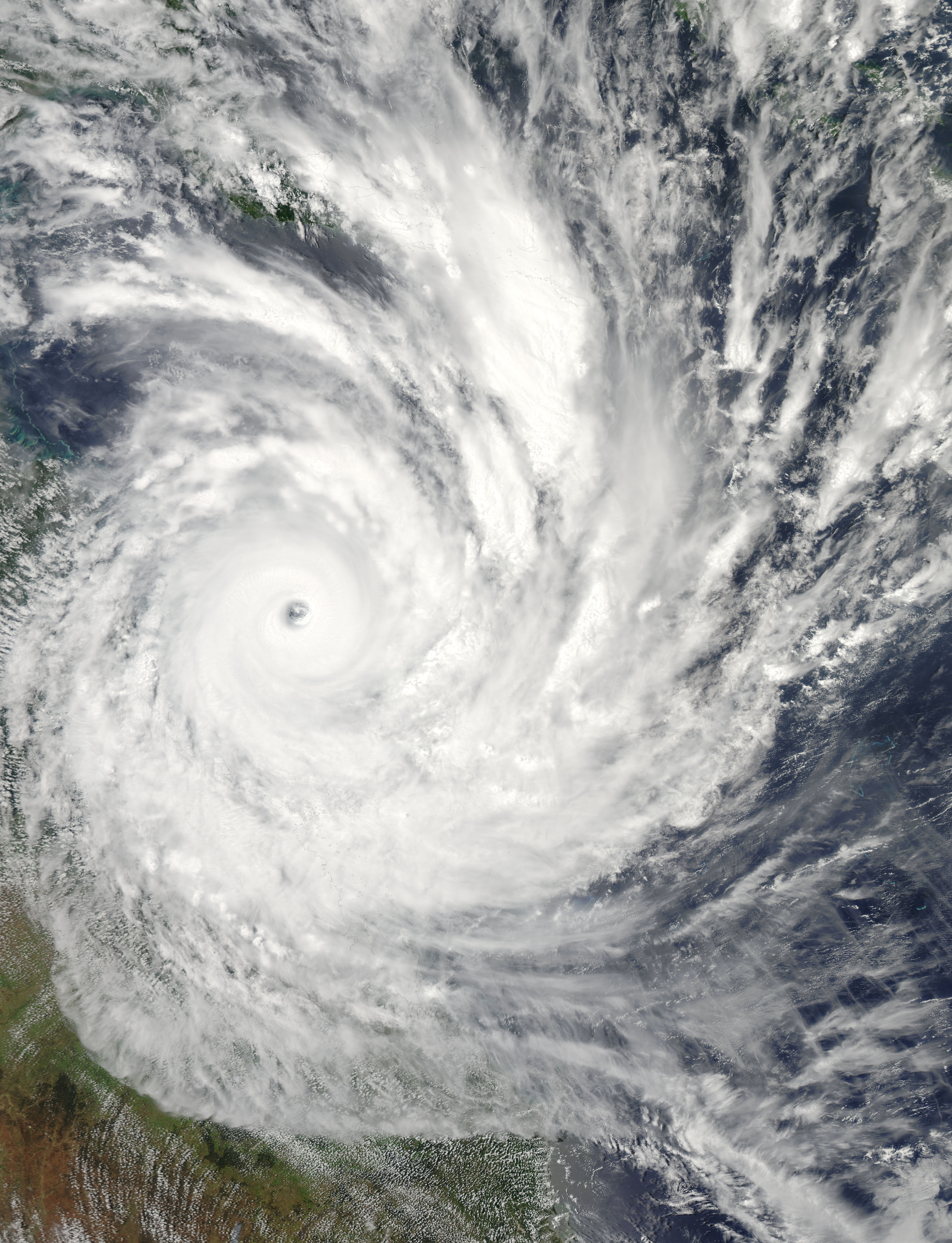
Cyclone Yasi

During January 2011, a total of 12 tropical cyclones, all of them, formed within the southern hemisphere. No tropical cyclone was observed in the northern hemisphere. Of the systems, 7 further intensified to become named. Out of the systems, Wilma was the most intense tropical cyclone, with a minimum barometric pressure of 935 mbar/hPa.

Tropical cyclones formed in January 2011
Storm name	Dates active	Max wind km/h (mph)	Pressure (hPa)	Areas affected	Damage (USD)	Deaths	Refs
03	January 2–3	55 (35)	996	Madagascar	None	None	
Vania	January 5–15	100 (65)	973	Vanuatu, Fiji, New Caledonia, New Zealand	unknown	unknown	
04F	January 5–7	185 (115)	1002	New Caledonia	$25 million	3 direct, 1 indirect	
Vince	January 10—15	75 (45)	986	None	None	None	
Zelia	January 12—17	185 (115)	943	New Caledonia, Norfolk Island, New Zealand	None	None	
Wilma	January 19–29	185 (115)	935	Samoan Islands, Tonga, New Zealand	$22 million	3	
07F	January 20–22	65 (40)	996	New Caledonia	None	None	
Anthony	January 22–31	95 (60)	989	Queensland	Minor	None	
Bianca	January 23–30	175 (110)	949	Northern Territory, Western Australia	Unknown	2	
Yasi	January 26–February 3	205 (125)	929	Tuvalu, Fiji, Solomon Islands, Vanuatu, Papua New Guinea, Australia	$3.6 billion	1	
04	January 30–31	45 (30)	998	Réunion	None	None	
13U	January 31	Not Specified	Not Specified	None	None	None	

=== February ===
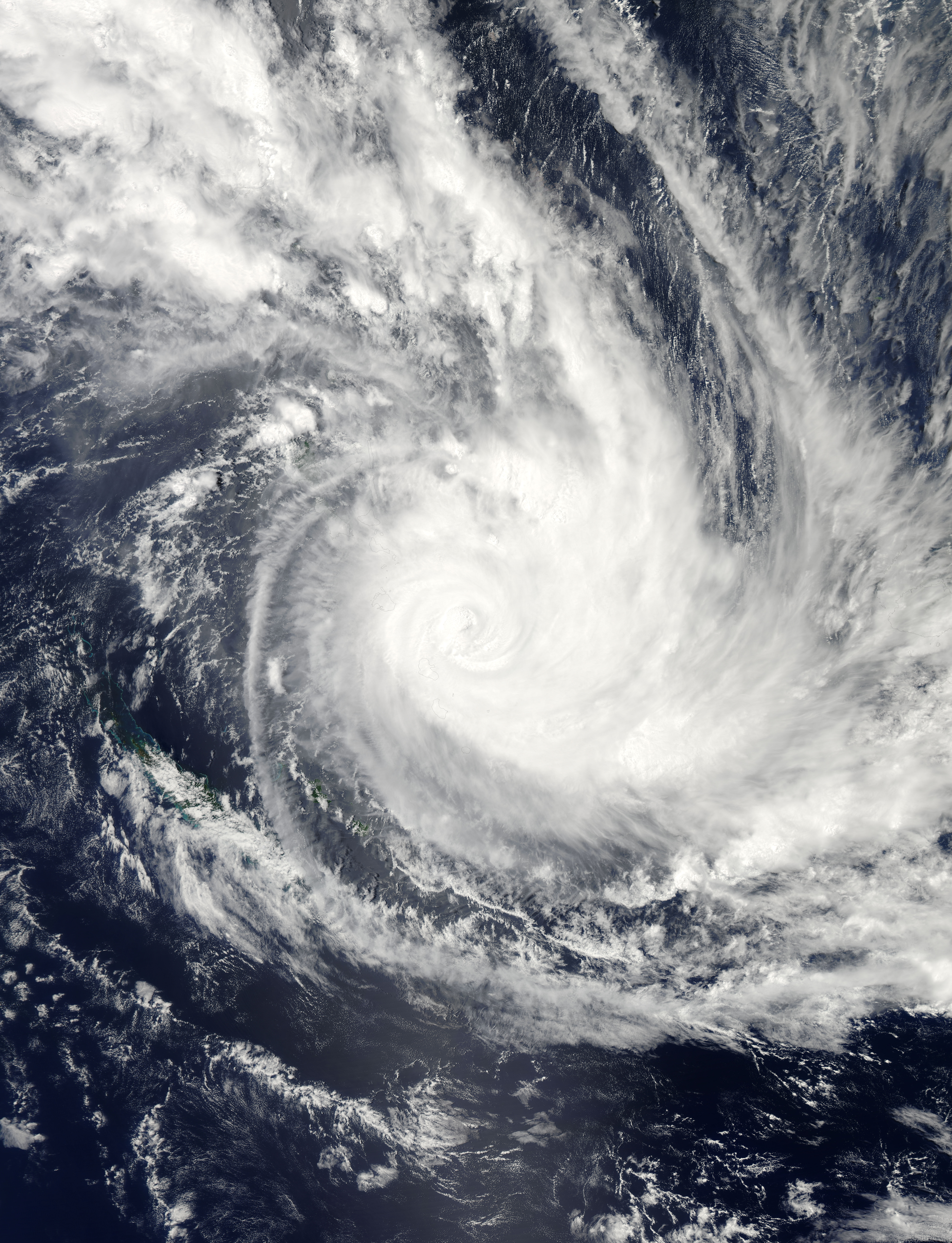
Cyclone Atu

10 systems formed and 5 named storms during February.

Tropical cyclones formed in February 2011
Storm name	Dates active	Max wind km/h (mph)	Pressure (hPa)	Areas affected	Damage (USD)	Deaths	Refs
BOB 01	February 2–3	45 (30)	1002	Sri Lanka	297 million	18	
Zaka	February 5–7	95 (60)	985	None	None	None	
15U	February 8–13	55 (35)	996	None	None	None	
Bingiza	February 9–17	155 (100)	957	Comoros, Madagascar	Unknown	34	
Atu	February 13–24	165 (105)	940	Vanuatu	Unknown	None	
Dianne	February 14–22	140 (85)	960	Western Australia	Minimal	None	
Carlos	February 14–27	120 (75)	969	Northern Territory, Western Australia	$12.3 million	None	
06	February 15–18	45 (30)	1000	None	None	None	
18U	February 23–28	55 (35)	992	None	None	None	
19U	February 26–March 1	Not Specified	1000	Northern Territory	None	None	

=== March ===
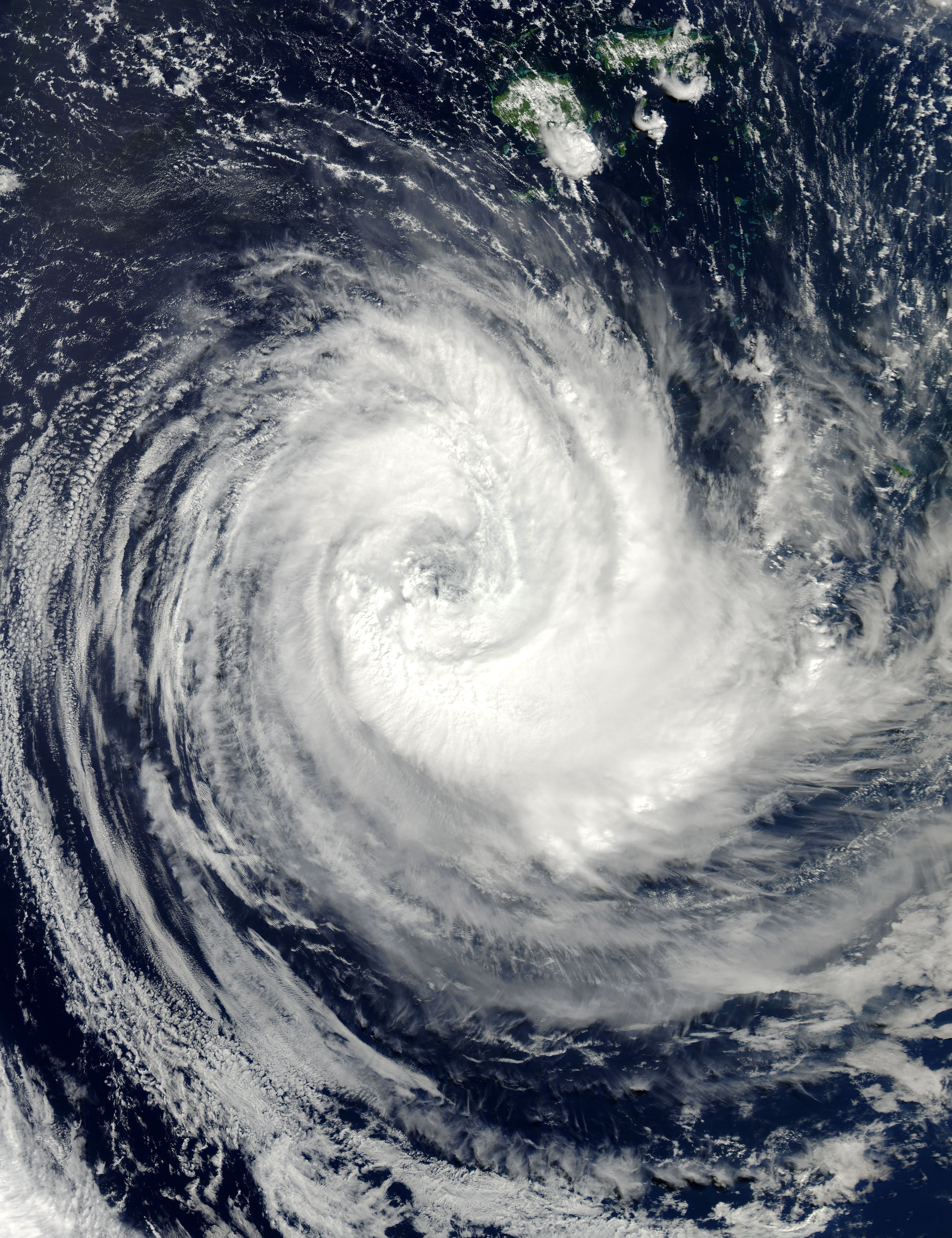
Cyclone Bune

March was a relatively inactive month in which 11 systems formed, and only 3 received names.

Tropical cyclones formed in March 2011
Storm name	Dates active	Max wind km/h (mph)	Pressure (hPa)	Areas affected	Damage (USD)	Deaths	Refs
20U	March 5	Not Specified	Not Specified	None	None	None	
21U	March 7–8	45 (30)	1004	None	None	None	
12F	March 7–9	45 (30)	1002	Vanuatu	None	None	
22U	March 10–15	Not Specified	Not Specified	None	None	None	
Cherono	March 10–23	75 (45)	993	Rodrigues Island	None	None	
Arani	March 14–16	85 (50)	989	Brazil	None	None	
Bune	March 22 – 29	130 (80)	967	Fiji	None	None	
25U	March 26–April 6	55 (35)	994	None	None	None	
08	March 29–31	45 (30)	1004	None	None	None	
26U	March 30–April 1	Not Specified	1006	None	None	None	
27U	March 30–April 1	Not Specified	1006	None	None	None	

=== April ===
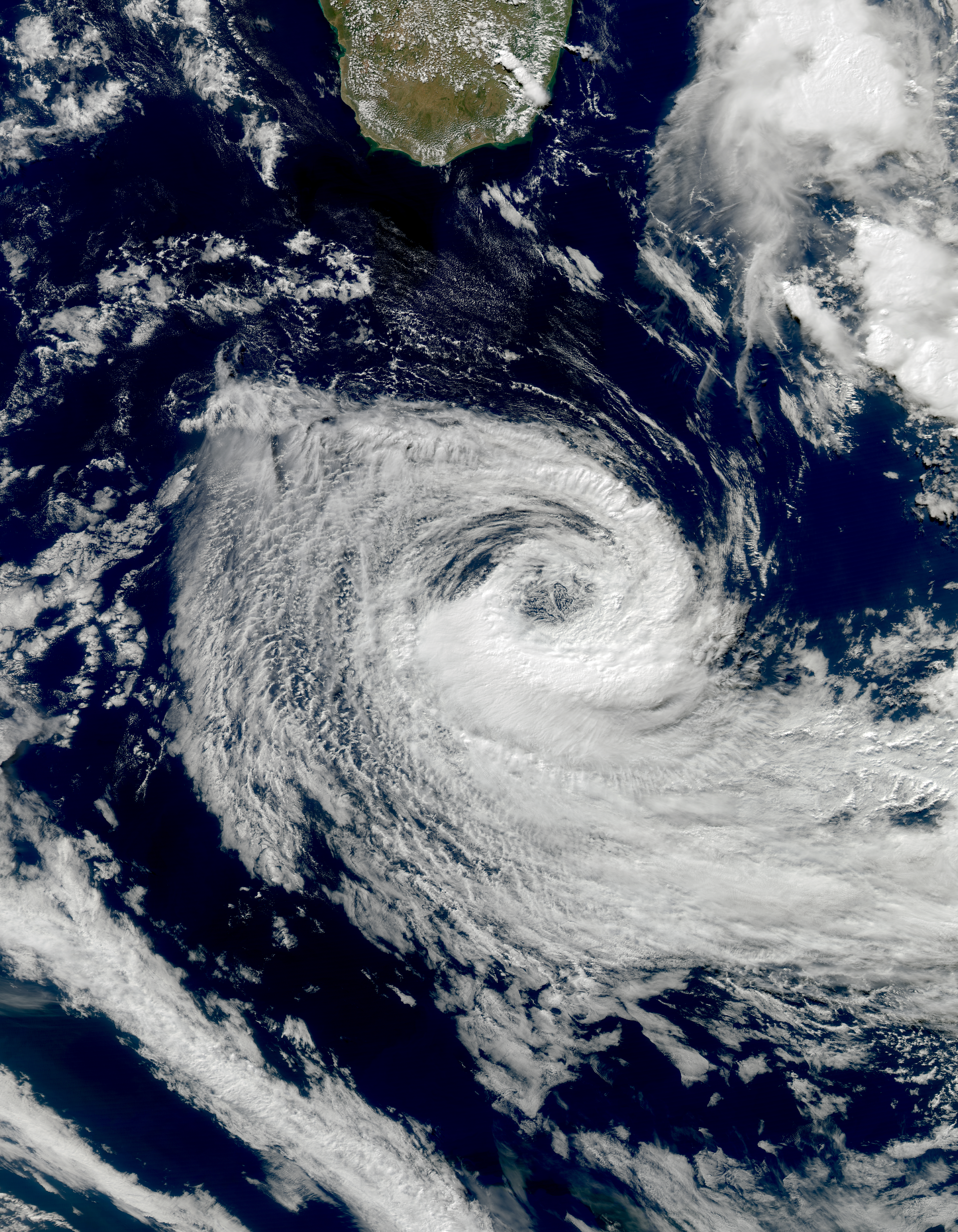
Subtropical Depression 09

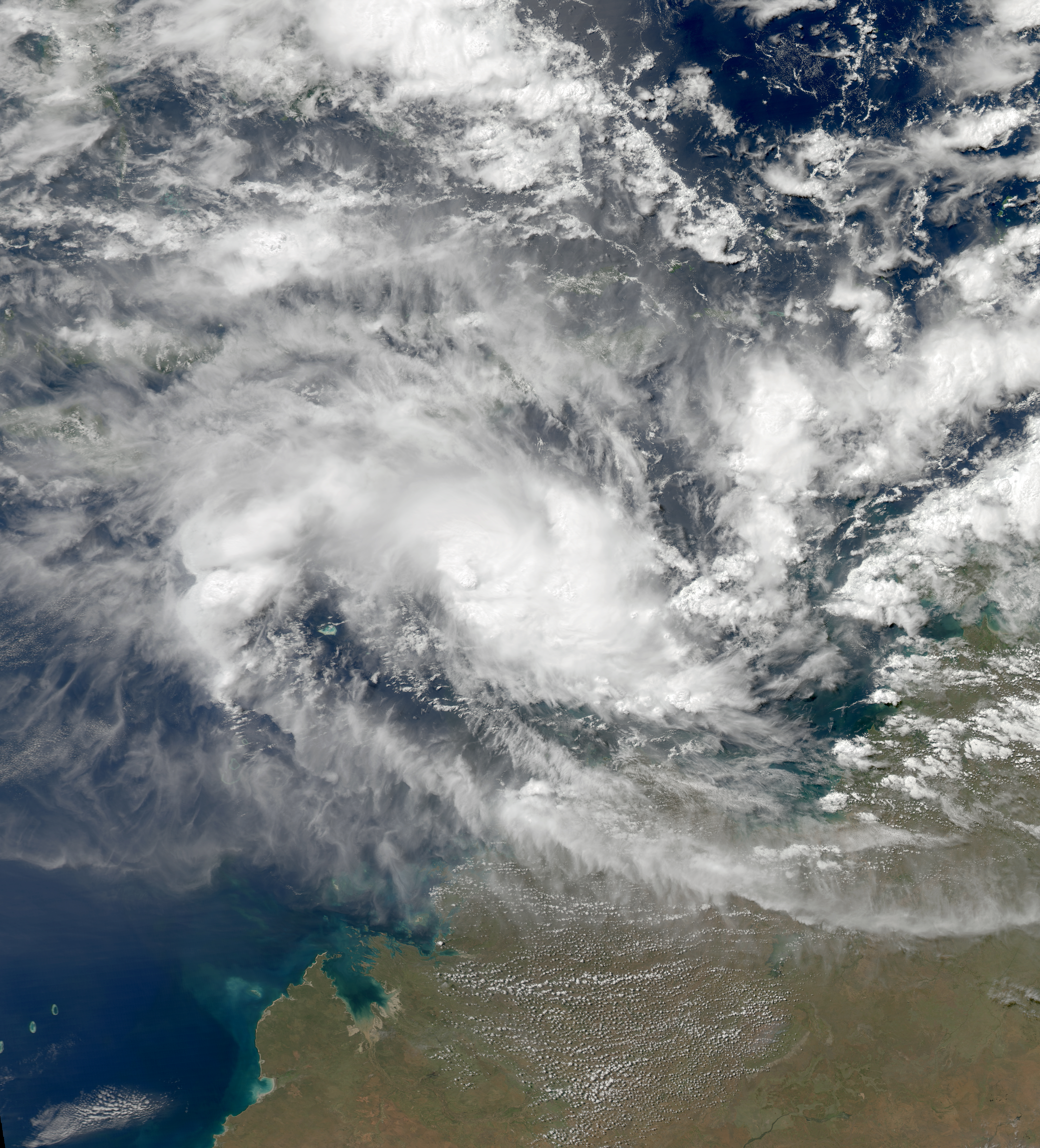
Cyclone Errol

Tropical cyclones formed in April 2011
Storm name	Dates active	Max wind km/h (mph)	Pressure (hPa)	Areas affected	Damage (USD)	Deaths	Refs
01W	April 1–4	55 (35)	1004	None	None	None	
02W (Amang)	April 3–6	55 (35)	1000	Mariana Islands	None	None	
14F	April 10–11	Not Specified	1005	Vanuatu	None	None	
09	April 11–16	95 (60)	985	None	None	None	
28U	April 14–15	Not Specified	Not Specified	None	None	None	
Errol	April 14–20	100 (65)	986	Indonesia, Western Australia, Northern Territory	None	None	
15F	April 15–17	55 (35)	999	None	None	None	
16F	April 28–30	Not Specified	1002	None	None	None	

=== May ===
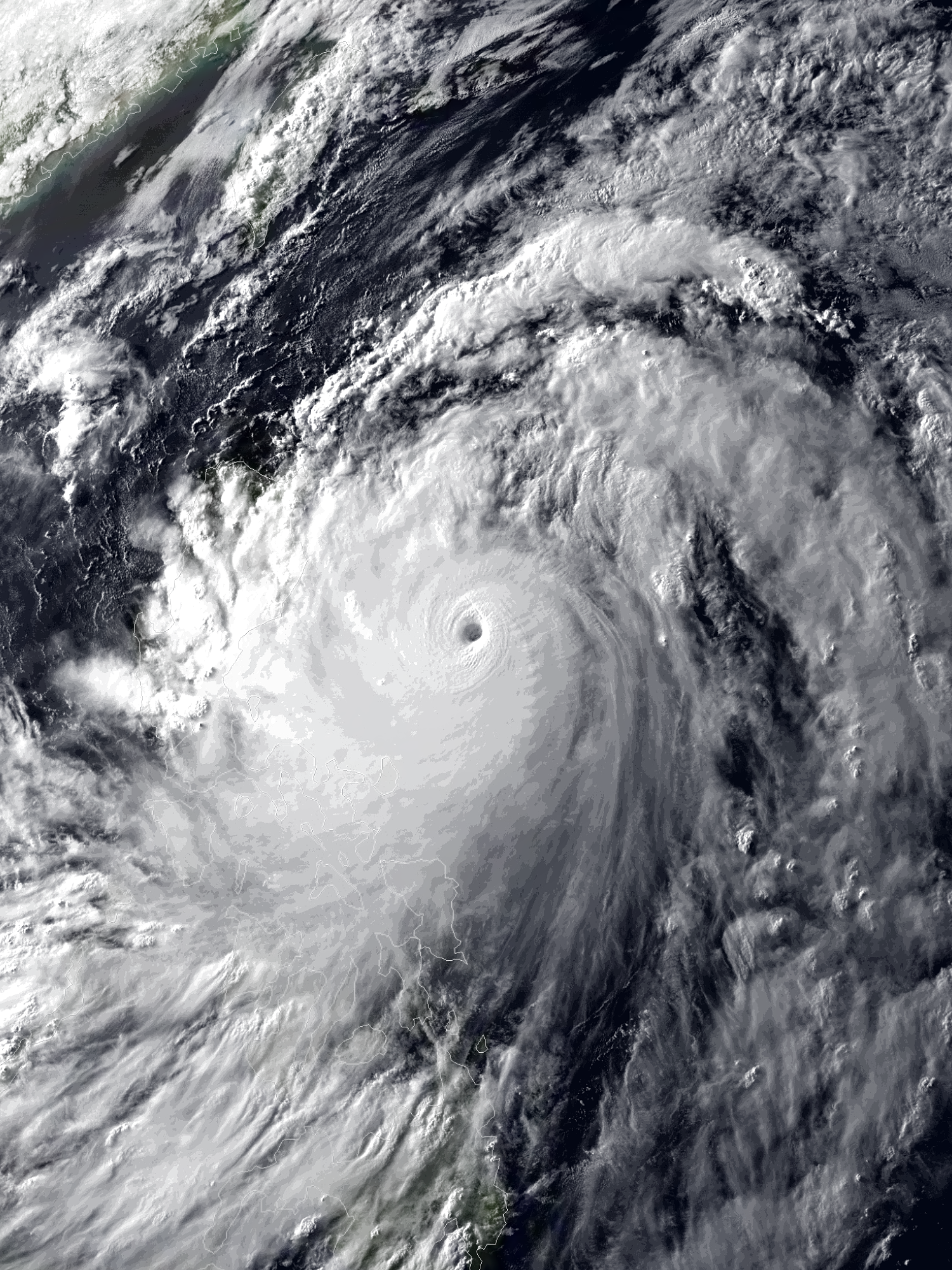
Typhoon Songda

May was a mostly inactive month in which only 4 tropical cyclones formed, in which 2 received names.

Tropical cyclones formed in May 2011
Storm name	Dates active	Max wind km/h (mph)	Pressure (hPa)	Areas affected	Damage (USD)	Deaths	Refs
Aere (Bebeng)	May 5–12	75 (45)	992	Philippines, Japan	$34.4 million	48	
17F	May 10–11	55 (35)	1000	None	None	None	
Songda (Chedeng)	May 19–29	195 (120)	920	Micronesia, Philippines, Japan	$287 million	17	
TD	May 31–June 1	Not specified	1004	None	None	None	

=== June ===
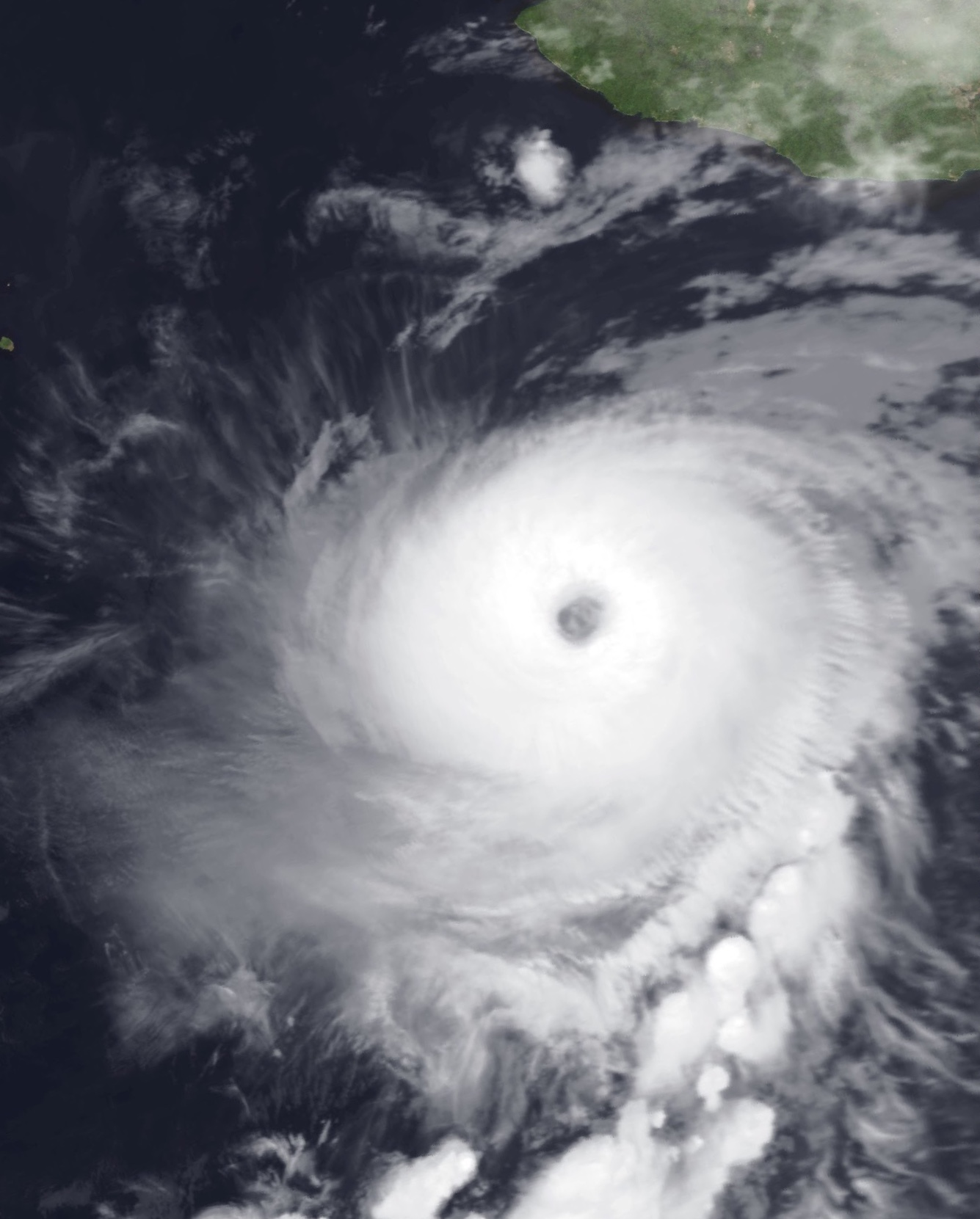
Hurricane Adrian

Tropical cyclones formed in June 2011
Storm name	Dates active	Max wind km/h (mph)	Pressure (hPa)	Areas affected	Damage (USD)	Deaths	Refs
Adrian	June 7–12	220 (140)	944	Southwestern Mexico	None	None	
Sarika (Dodong)	June 8–11	75 (45)	996	Philippines, China	$248 million	28	
ARB 01	June 11–12	45 (30)	996	India	None	None	
TD	June 14–15	Not specified	1004	China	None	None	
Haima (Egay)	June 16–25	75 (45)	985	Philippines, China, Vietnam, Laos, Thailand	$167 million	18	
BOB 02	June 16–23	65 (40)	978	India	None	6	
Beatriz	June 19–22	150 (90)	977	Southwestern and Western Mexico	None	4	
Meari (Falcon)	June 20–27	110 (70)	970	Philippines, China, Japan, Korea	$1.24 million	11	
Arlene	June 28–July 1	100 (65)	993	Central America, Mexico, Texas, Florida	$223.4 million	22	

=== July ===
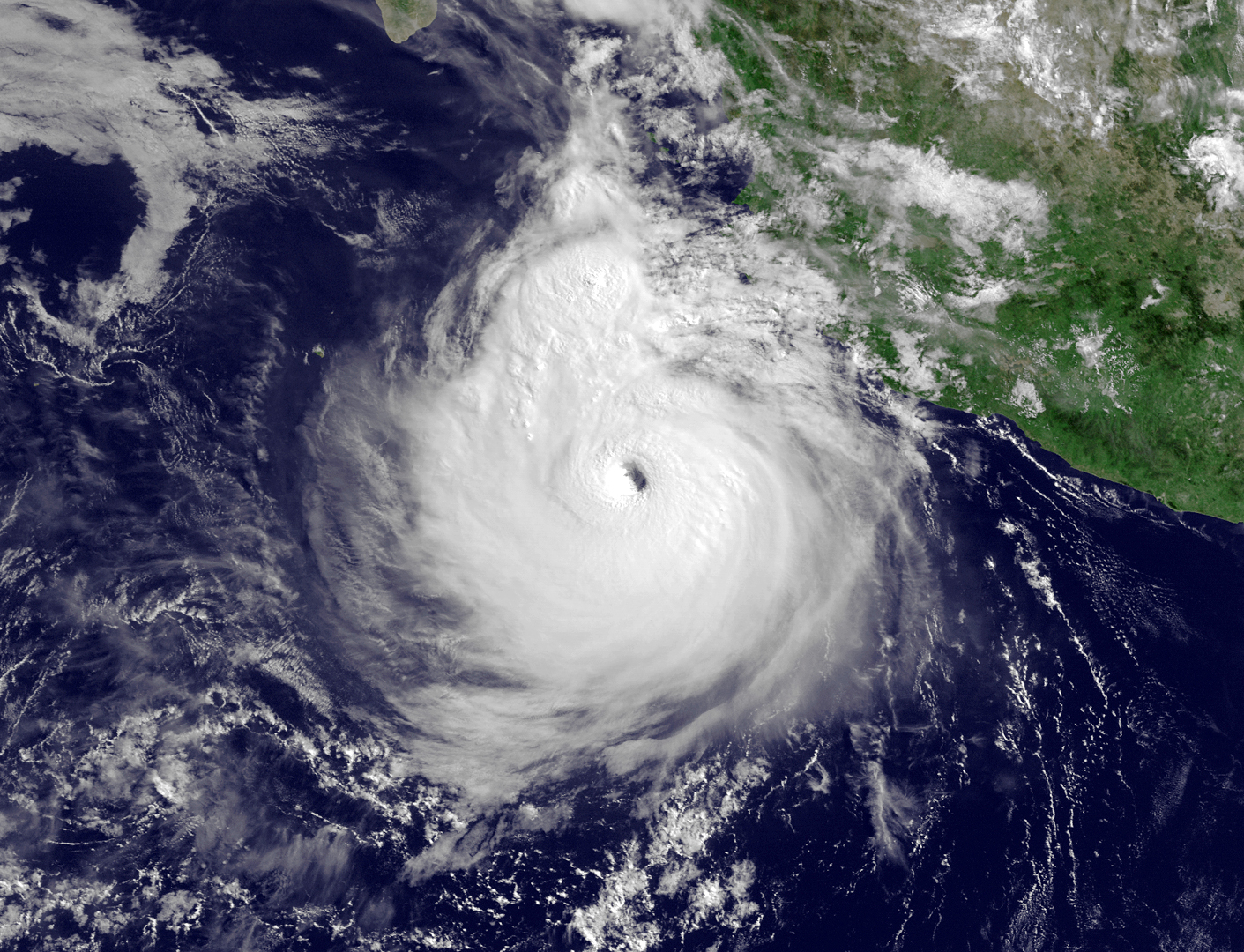
Hurricane Dora

Tropical cyclones formed in July 2011
Storm name	Dates active	Max wind km/h (mph)	Pressure (hPa)	Areas affected	Damage (USD)	Deaths	Refs
Calvin	July 7–10	130 (80)	984	None	None	None	
Goring	July 8–10	45 (30)	1000	Taiwan, China	None	None	
Ma-on (Ineng)	July 11–24	175 (110)	935	Northern Mariana Islands, Japan	$50 million	5	
Tokage (Hanna)	July 13–15	65 (40)	1000	None	None	None	
TD	July 16–17	Not specified	1000	China	None	None	
Bret	July 17–22	110 (70)	995	Bahamas, Bermuda, East Coast of the United States	None	None	
Dora	July 18–24	250 (155)	929	Southwestern Mexico, Western Mexico, Baja California Peninsula, Southwestern United States	Minimal	None	
Cindy	July 20–22	110 (70)	994	Bermuda	None	None	
LAND 01	July 22–23	35 (25)	990	India	None	None	
Nock-ten (Juaning)	July 24–31	95 (60)	985	Philippines, China, Vietnam, Laos, Thailand	$126 million	128	
Muifa (Kabayan)	July 25–August 9	175 (110)	930	Micronesia, Caroline Islands, Philippines, Japan, China, Korea, Russia	$480 million	22	
Don	July 27–30	85 (50)	997	Cuba, Yucatán Peninsula, Northeastern Mexico, Texas	None	None	
Lando	July 31–August 2	Not specified	1002	Philippines	None	None	
Eugene	July 31–August 6	220 (140)	942	None	None	None	

=== August ===
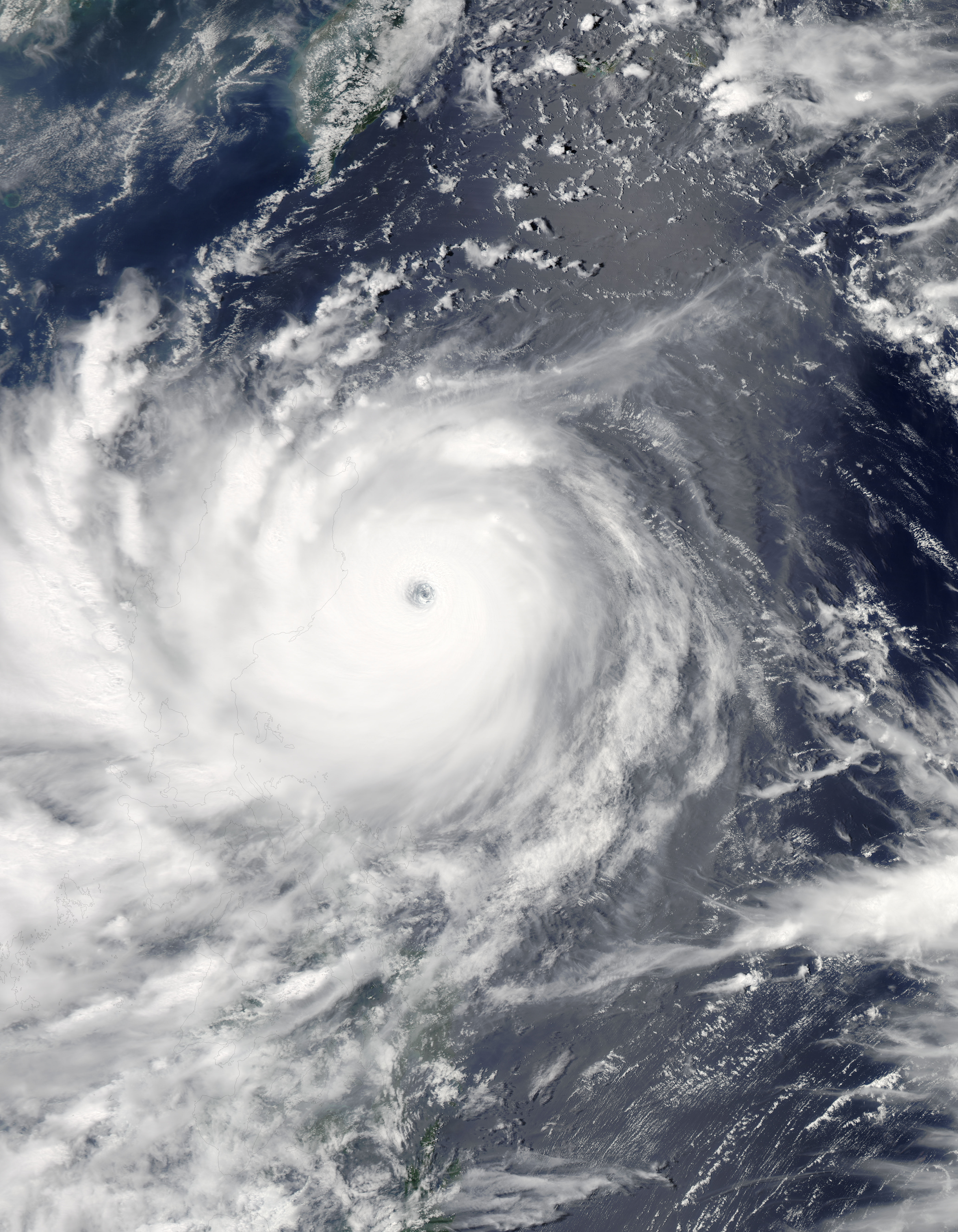
Typhoon Nanmadol

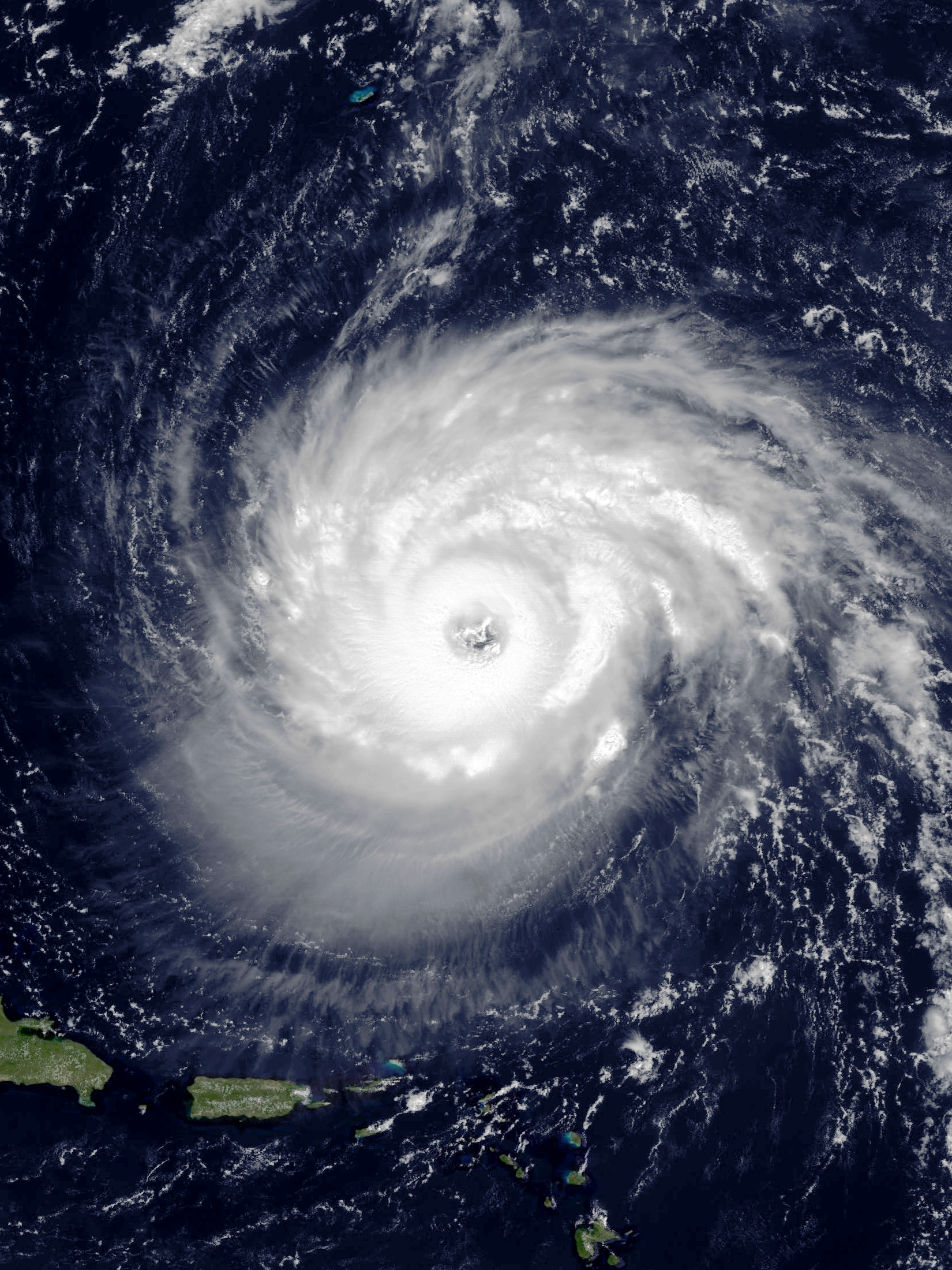
Hurricane Katia

August was the most active month of 2011, with 18 systems forming in the month.

Tropical cyclones formed in August 2011
Storm name	Dates active	Max wind km/h (mph)	Pressure (hPa)	Areas affected	Damage (USD)	Deaths	Refs
Emily	August 2–7	85 (50)	1003	Antilles, Florida, Bahamas	$5 million	5	
Merbok	August 2–9	95 (60)	980	None	None	None	
TD	August 2–4	55 (35)	1008	Japan	None	None	
13W	August 8–14	55 (35)	1004	None	None	None	
TD	August 8–10	55 (35)	1008	None	None	None	
Franklin	August 12–13	75 (45)	1004	Bermuda	None	None	
Gert	August 13–16	100 (65)	1000	Bermuda	None	None	
Fernanda	August 15–19	110 (70)	992	None	None	None	
Greg	August 16–21	140 (85)	979	None	None	None	
Harvey	August 19–22	100 (65)	994	Lesser Antilles, Hispaniola, Central America, Mexico	Minimal	5	
TD	August 20–25	55 (35)	1004	None	None	None	
Irene	August 21–28	195 (120)	942	Lesser Antilles, Greater Antilles, Turks and Caicos, Bahamas, East Coast of the United States, Vermont, Atlantic Canada	$14.2 billion	58	
Nanmadol (Mina)	August 21–31	185 (115)	925	Philippines, Taiwan, China	$1.49 billion	38	
Talas	August 23–September 5	95 (60)	970	Japan	$600 million	82	
Ten	August 25–26	55 (35)	1006	None	None	None	
Jose	August 26–29	75 (45)	1006	Bermuda	None	None	
Katia	August 29–September 10	220 (140)	942	Lesser Antilles, East Coast of the United States, Canada, United Kingdom	$157 million	4	
Eight-E	August 31–September 1	55 (35)	1002	Southwestern Mexico, Western Mexico	None	None	

=== September ===
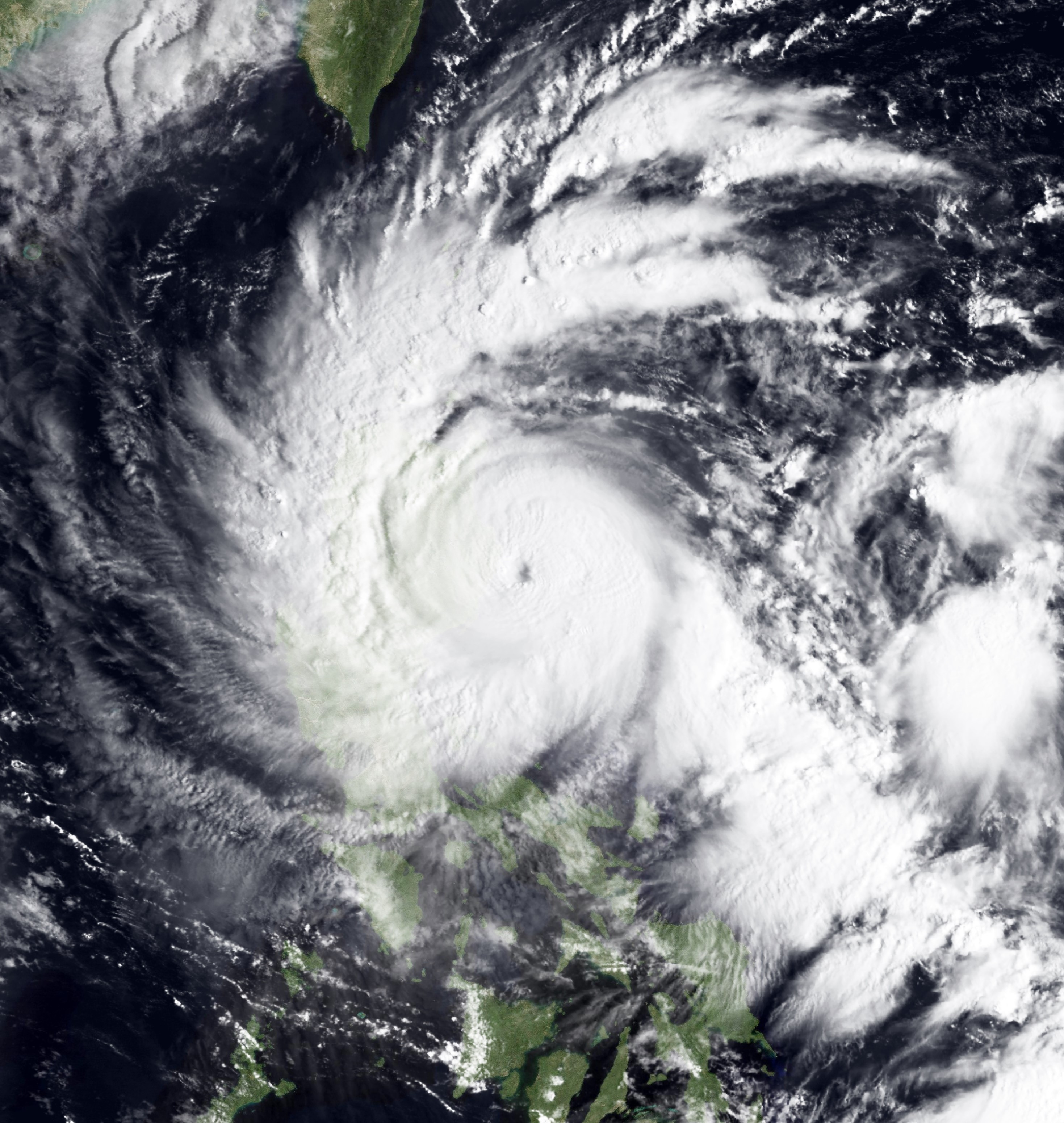
Typhoon Nalgae

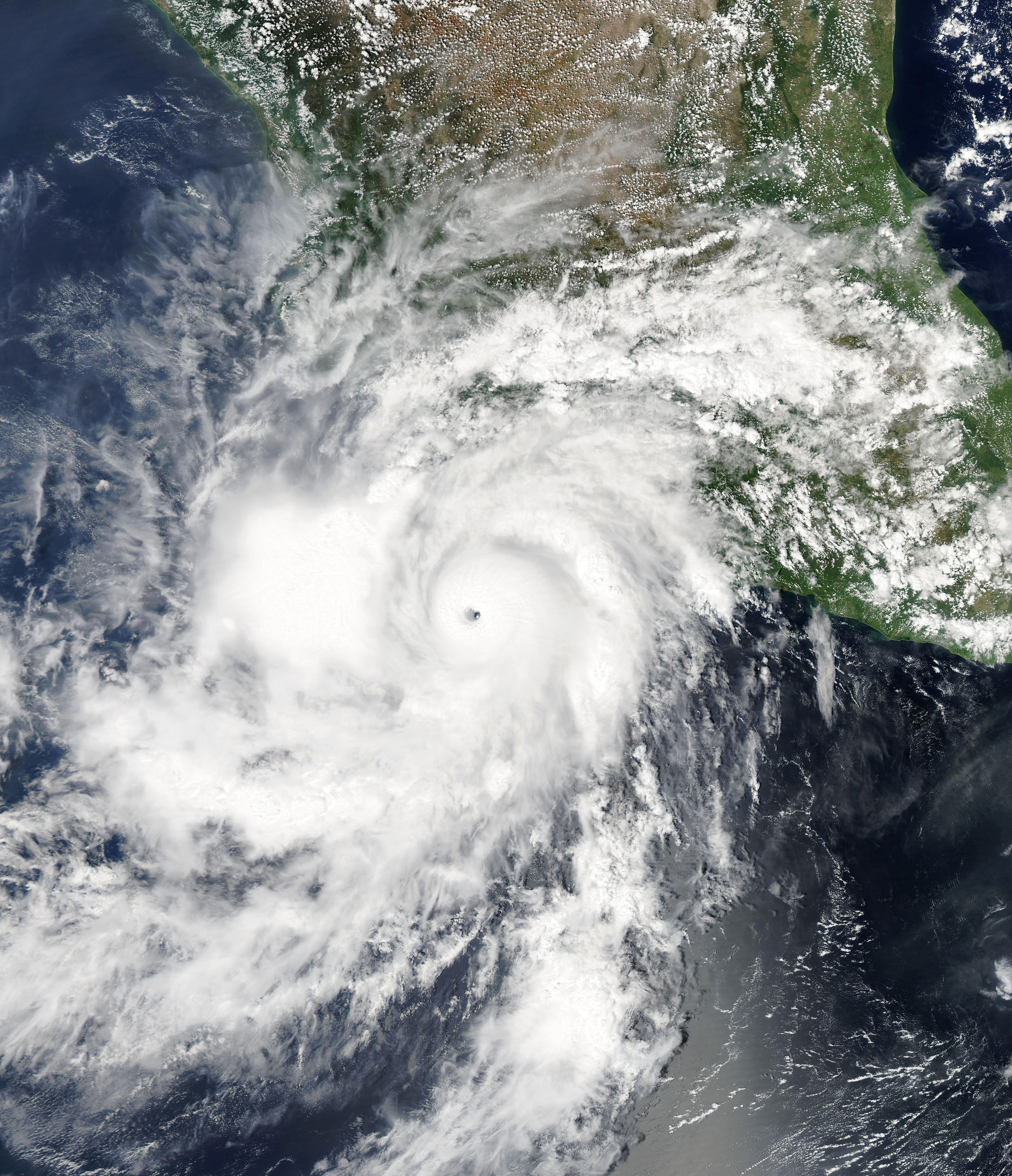
Hurricane Hilary

September was a below-average month, with only 16 tropical cyclones forming in that month.

Tropical cyclones formed in September 2011
Storm name	Dates active	Max wind km/h (mph)	Pressure (hPa)	Areas affected	Damage (USD)	Deaths	Refs
Unnamed	September 1–3	75 (45)	1002	None	None	None	
Lee	September 2–5	95 (60)	986	Gulf Coast of the United States, Eastern United States	$2.8 billion	18	
Noru	September 2–6	75 (45)	990	None	None	None	
Kulap (Nonoy)	September 6–11	65 (40)	1000	Japan, Korea	None	None	
Maria	September 6–16	130 (80)	983	Lesser Antilles, Bermuda, Newfoundland, Europe	$1.3 million	None	
Nate	September 7–11	120 (75)	994	Mexico	Minimal	5	
Roke (Onyok)	September 8–22	155 (100)	940	Japan, Russia, Alaska	$1.2 billion	13	
TD	September 13–15	Not specified	1002	Taiwan	None	None	
Sonca	September 14–20	130 (80)	970	None	None	None	
Ophelia	September 20–October 3	220 (140)	940	Leeward Islands, Bermuda, Newfoundland	Minimal	None	
Hilary	September 21–30	230 (145)	942	Southwestern Mexico	Minimal	None	
BOB 03	September 22–23	45 (30)	995	India	Unknown	42	
Nesat (Pedring)	September 23–30	150 (90)	950	Philippines, China, Vietnam	$2.12 billion	98	
Haitang	September 24–27	65 (40)	996	China, Vietnam, Laos	$20 million	25	
Philippe	September 24–October 8	150 (90)	976	Cape Verde	None	None	
Nalgae (Quiel)	September 26–October 5	175 (110)	935	Philippines, China, Vietnam	$250 million	18	

=== October ===
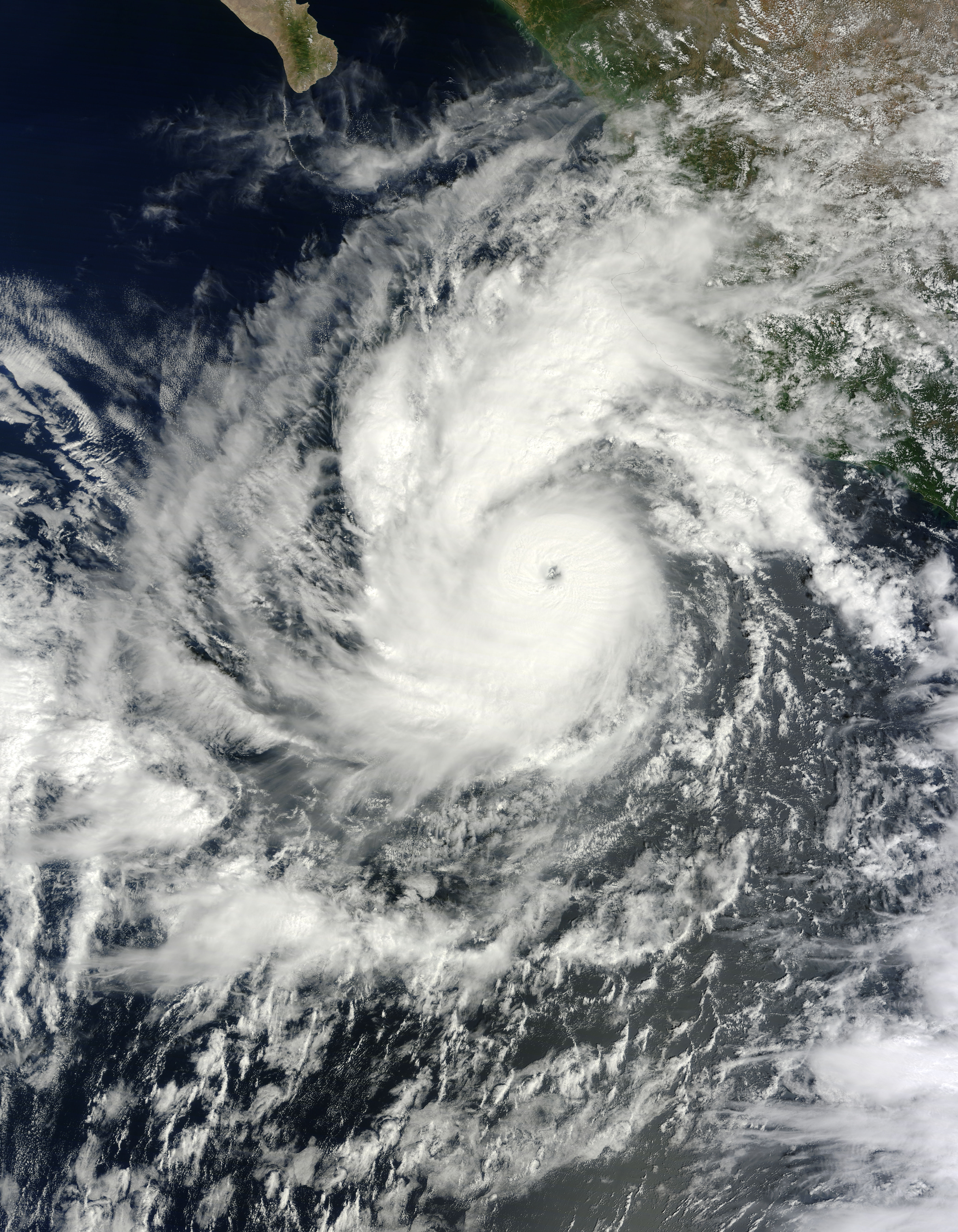
Hurricane Jova

Tropical cyclones formed in October 2011
Storm name	Dates active	Max wind km/h (mph)	Pressure (hPa)	Areas affected	Damage (USD)	Deaths	Refs
Jova	October 6–13	205 (125)	955	Southwestern Mexico, Western Mexico	≥$204 million	9	
Irwin	October 6–16	155 (100)	976	Western Mexico	None	None	
Banyan (Ramon)	October 9–14	65 (40)	1002	Palau, Philippines	$2.1 million	10	
TD	October 10–13	Not specified	1006	China, Vietnam	None	None	
Twelve-E	October 12	35 (55)	1004	Southwestern Mexico, Central America	Unknown	30	
BOB 04	October 19–20	55 (35)	1002	Bangladesh, Myanmar	1.64 million	215	
Rina	October 23–28	185 (115)	966	Central America, Yucatán Peninsula, Cuba, Florida	$2.3 million	None	
Keila	October 29–November 4	65 (40)	996	Oman, Yemen	$80 million	14	

=== November ===
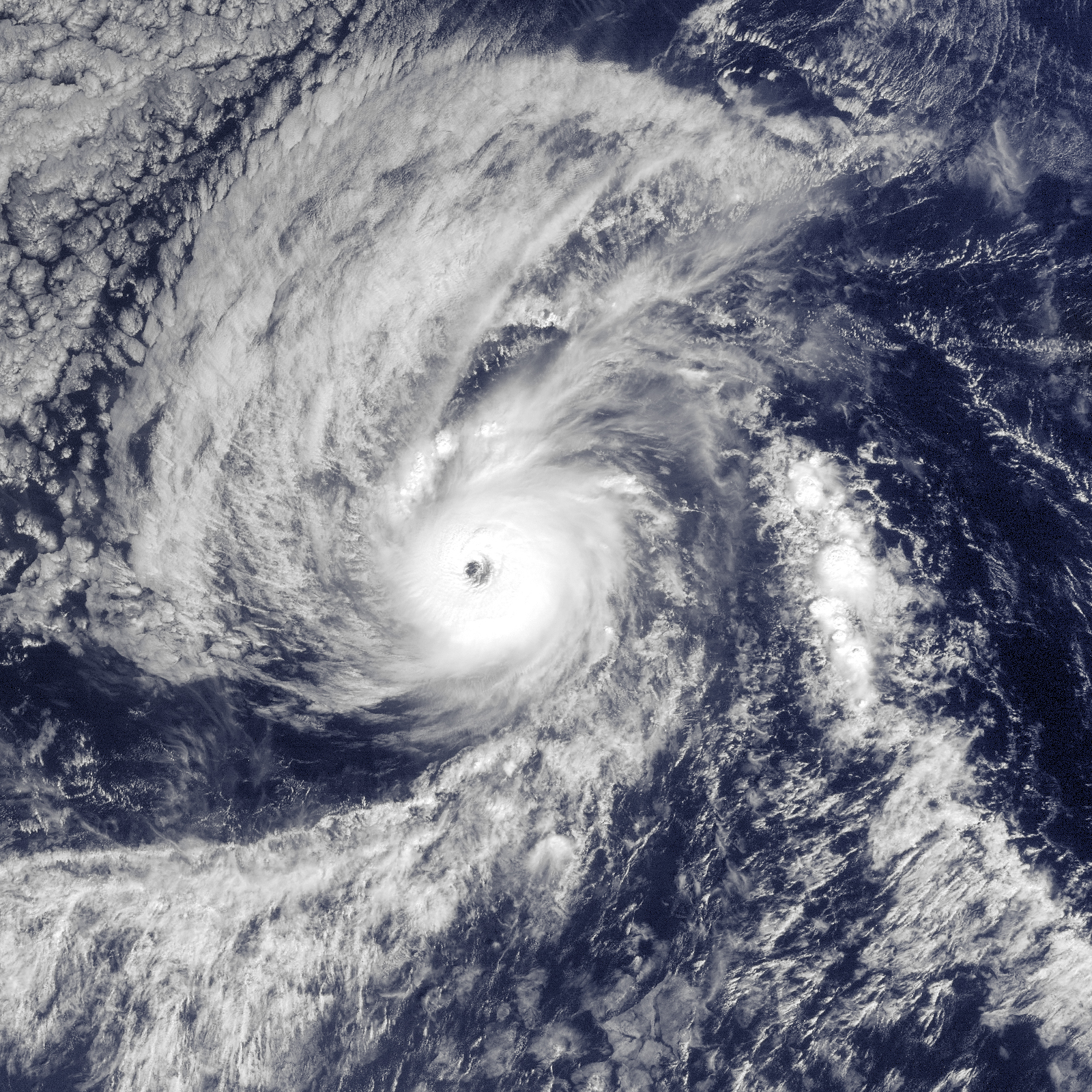
Hurricane Kenneth

November was inactive with only 7 tropical cyclones forming, as well as Rolf, a system that formed in the Mediterranean sea.

Tropical cyclones formed in November 2011
Storm name	Dates active	Max wind km/h (mph)	Pressure (hPa)	Areas affected	Damage (USD)	Deaths	Refs
ARB 03	November 6–10	55 (35)	1000	None	None	None	
Rolf	November 6–9	85 (50)	991	Italy, France, Switzerland, Spain	>$1.25 billion	12	
24W	November 7–10	45 (30)	1004	Vietnam	None	None	
Sean	November 8–11	100 (65)	982	Bermuda	Minimal	1	
01F	November 13–16	Not Specified	1004	Fiji	None	None	
Kenneth	November 19–25	230 (145)	940	None	None	None	
ARB 04	November 26–December 1	55 (35)	998	Lakshadweep, India, Sri Lanka, Maldives	Unknown	19	

=== December ===
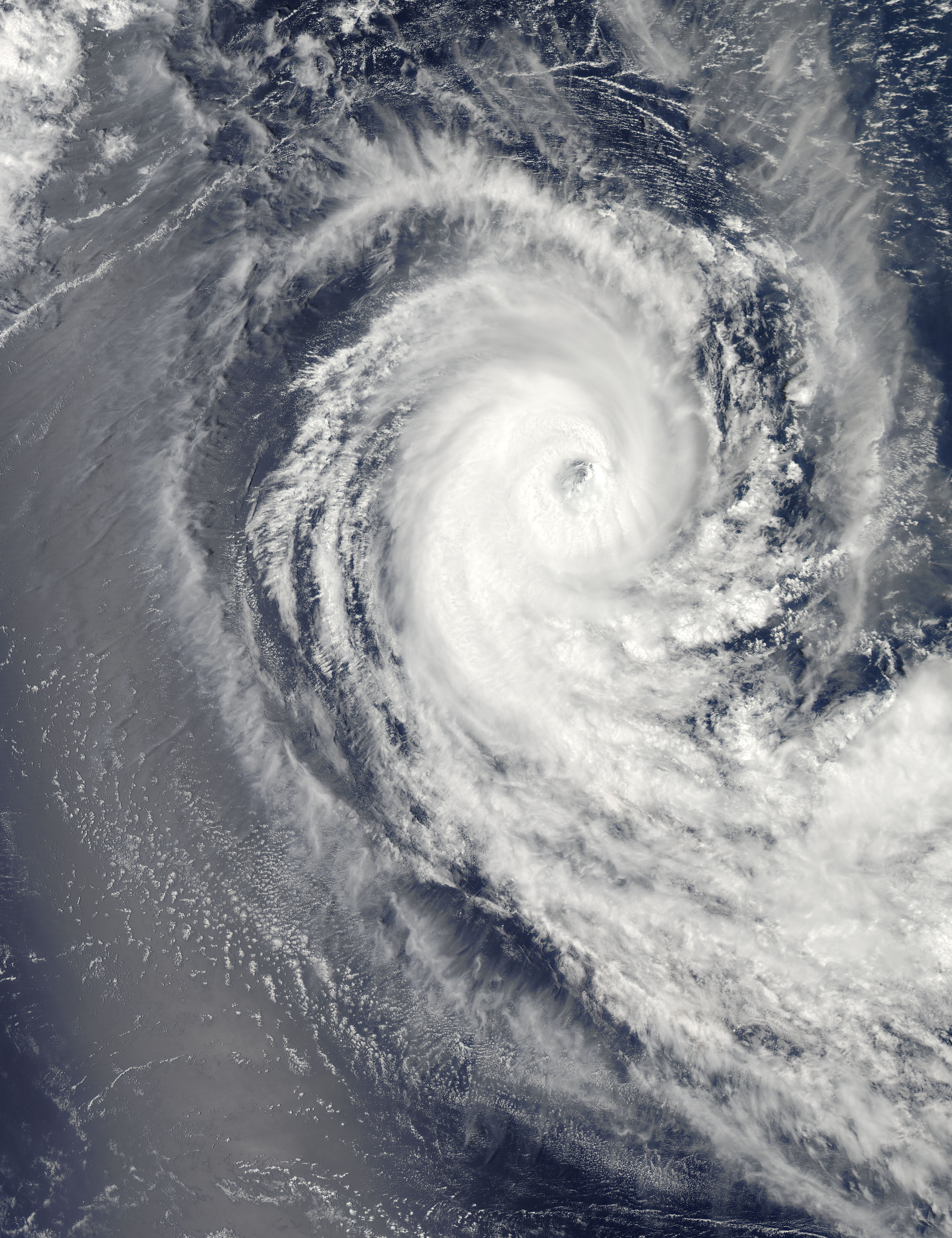
Cyclone Benilde

Tropical cyclones formed in December 2011
Storm name	Dates active	Max wind km/h (mph)	Pressure (hPa)	Areas affected	Damage (USD)	Deaths	Refs
Alenga	December 3–11	140 (85)	972	None	None	None	
25W	December 4–5	45 (30)	1006	Brunei, Malaysia	None	None	
02	December 6–9	55 (35)	998	Mauritius	None	None	
26W	December 10–14	55 (35)	1004	Philippines	None	4	
Washi (Sendong)	December 13–19	95 (60)	992	Philippines, Micronesia, Palau	$97.8 million	2,546	
Fina	December 18–23	65 (40)	994	Papua New Guinea, New Caledonia	None	None	
03	December 19–23	55 (35)	1000	Madagascar	None	None	
Benilde	December 21–January 4	150 (90)	968	None	None	None	
Grant	December 21–January 2	100 (65)	978	Northern Territory	Minor	None	
TD	December 24	Not specified	1002	None	None	None	
Thane	December 25–December 31	140 (85)	969	India, Sri Lanka	$235 million	46	
05U	December 26–28	Not Specified	Not Specified	None	None	None	
02F	December 28–January 1	Not Specified	1002	Niue, Cook Islands	None	None	
TD	December 31–January 1	Not specified	1008	Malaysia	None	None	

== Global effects ==
There are a total of seven tropical cyclone basins that tropical cyclones typically form in this table, data from all these basins are added.

Season name		Areas affected	Systems formed	Named storms	Hurricane-force tropical cyclones	Damage (2011 USD)	Deaths	Ref.
North Atlantic Ocean (Note: The wind speeds for this tropical cyclone/basin are based on the Saffir Simpson Scale which uses 1-minute sustained winds.)		Central America, Yucatan Peninsula, Southeastern United States, Gulf Coast of the United States, Lucayan Archipelago, Bermuda, East Coast of the United States, Greater Antilles, Northeastern Mexico, Lesser Antilles, Eastern United States, Atlantic Canada, Western Europe, Leeward Islands	20	19	7	$17.38 billion	96 (16)	
Eastern and Central Pacific Ocean		Southwestern Mexico, Western Mexico, Baja California Peninsula, Southwestern United States, Central America	13	11	10	$204 million	49	
Western Pacific Ocean (Note: Only systems that formed either before or on December 31, 2011 are counted in the seasonal totals.)		Mariana Islands, Philippines, Japan, Micronesia, China, Vietnam, Laos, Thailand, Korea, Taiwan, Caroline Islands, Palau, Malaysia	39	21	10	$7.48 billion	3,111	
North Indian Ocean (Note: The wind speeds for this tropical cyclone/basin are based on the IMD Scale which uses 3-minute sustained winds.)		Sri Lanka, Bangladesh, Myanmar, Oman, Yemen, India	10	2	1	$603.64 million	360	
South-West Indian Ocean	January – June (Note: Only systems that formed either on or after January 1, 2011 are counted in the seasonal totals.) (Note: The wind speeds for this tropical cyclone are based on Météo-France, which uses wind gusts.)	Comoros, Madagascar, Rodrigues, Réunion	6	2	1	Unknown	34	
South-West Indian Ocean	July – December	Madagascar	2	1	1	—N/a	—N/a	
Australian region	January – June	Queensland, Northern Territory, Western Australia, Solomon Islands, West Timor	19	9	2	$3.61 billion	3	
Australian region	July – December	Papua New Guinea, Northern Territory, Queensland	4	2	1	Unknown	Unknown	
South Pacific Ocean	January – June	Fiji, Vanuatu, New Caledonia, New Zealand, Samoan Islands, Tuvalu, Vanuatu	13	6	4	$33 million	5	
South Pacific Ocean	July – December	Fiji, Niue, Cook Islands	2	—N/a	—N/a	—N/a	—N/a	
South Atlantic Ocean		Brazil	1	1	—N/a	Unknown	—N/a	
Mediterranean Sea		Western Europe	1	1	—N/a	$1.25 billion	12	
Worldwide		(See above)	130 (Note: The sum of the number of systems in each basin will not equal the number shown as the total. This is because when systems move between basins, it creates a discrepancy in the actual number of systems.)	75	37	$30.57 billion	3,670 (16)	

== See also ==
- Tropical cyclones by year
- List of earthquakes in 2011
- Tornadoes of 2011

== Notes ==
^{1}The "strength" of a tropical cyclone is measured by the minimum barometric pressure, not wind speed. Most meteorological organizations rate the intensity of a storm by this figure, so the lower the minimum pressure of the storm, the more intense or "stronger" it is considered to be.
^{2} Only systems that formed either on or after January 1, 2011 are counted in the seasonal totals.
^{3} Only systems that formed either before or on December 31, 2011 are counted in the seasonal totals.
^{4} The wind speeds for this tropical cyclone/basin are based on the IMD Scale which uses 3-minute sustained winds.
^{5} The wind speeds for this tropical cyclone/basin are based on the Saffir Simpson Scale which uses 1-minute sustained winds.
^{6}The wind speeds for this tropical cyclone are based on Météo-France which uses wind gusts.
