= Tropical Storm Haitang (2011) =

Weak tropical storm which impacted Southeast Asia during 2011

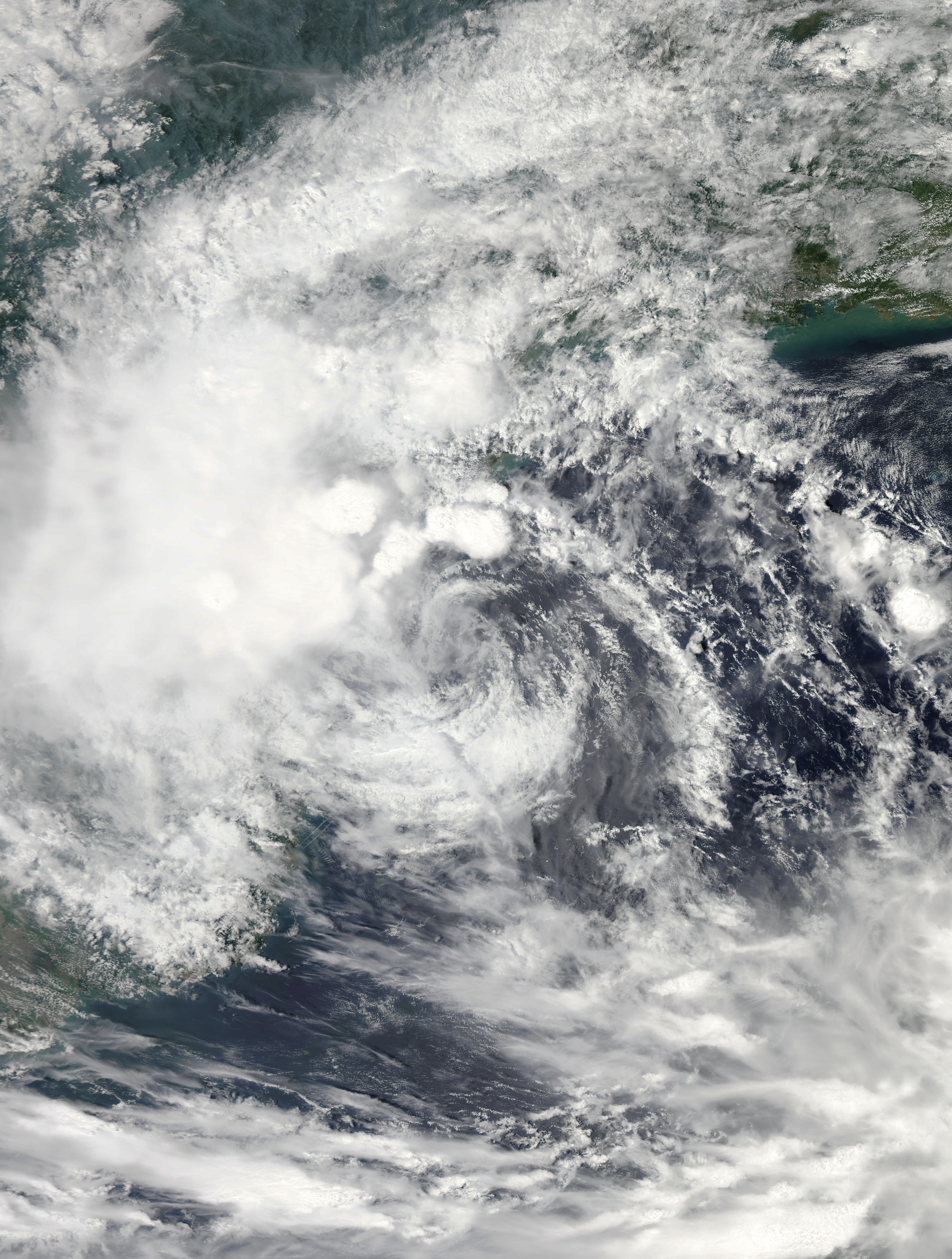
- Tropical Storm Haitang at peak intensity on September 26

Meteorological history
- Formed: September 24, 2011
- Dissipated: September 27, 2011

Tropical storm
- 10-minute sustained (JMA)
- Highest winds: 65 km/h (40 mph)
- Lowest pressure: 996 hPa (mbar); 29.41 inHg

Tropical storm
- 1-minute sustained (SSHWS/JTWC)
- Highest winds: 65 km/h (40 mph)
- Lowest pressure: 996 hPa (mbar); 29.41 inHg

Overall effects
- Fatalities: 7
- Missing: 4
- Damage: Unknown
- Areas affected: China, Southeast Asia
- Part of the 2011 Pacific typhoon season

Tropical Storm Haitang was a weak tropical cyclone which impacted China and Southeast Asia in late-September 2011. The nineteenth named storm of the below-average 2011 Pacific typhoon season, Haitang developed from a disturbance in the South China Sea. After being recognized as a tropical depression on September 24, Haitang would peak as a minimal tropical storm before making landfall in Hue, Vietnam. Haitang would rapidly weaken once inland, dissipating in Laos in September 27.

== Meteorological history ==
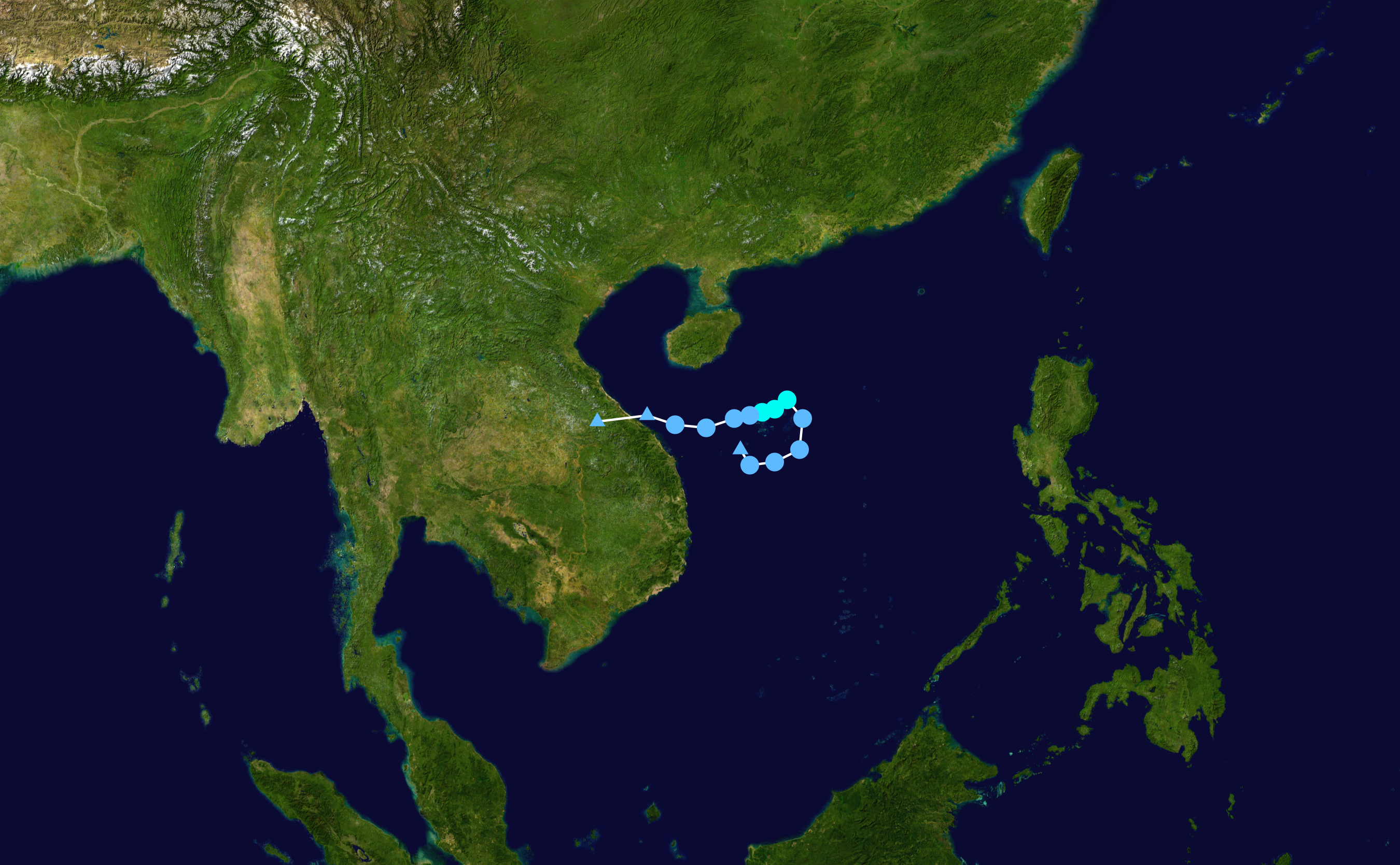
Map plotting the storm's track and intensity, according to the Saffir–Simpson scale Map key Saffir–Simpson scale Tropical depression (≤38 mph, ≤62 km/h) Tropical storm (39–73 mph, 63–118 km/h) Category 1 (74–95 mph, 119–153 km/h) Category 2 (96–110 mph, 154–177 km/h) Category 3 (111–129 mph, 178–208 km/h) Category 4 (130–156 mph, 209–251 km/h) Category 5 (≥157 mph, ≥252 km/h) Unknown Storm type Tropical cyclone Subtropical cyclone Extratropical cyclone, remnant low, tropical disturbance, or monsoon depression

At 15:00 UTC on September 21, the Joint Typhoon Warning Center (JTWC) began to monitor a low-pressure area persisting around 260 nautical miles south of Hong Kong. As the next three days progressed, the disturbance meandered northwards, strengthening slightly. On September 24, the Japan Meteorological Agency (JMA) would recognize the disturbance as a tropical depression east of Vietnam. Later that day, the JTWC would issue a Tropical Cyclone Formation Alert, stating that the low could develop into a tropical cyclone. A few hours later, the JTWC would issue its first advisory on the system, designating it as Tropical Depression 21W.

The next day, the JMA would upgrade the nascent depression to a tropical storm, naming it Haitang. (Note: The name Haitang (Mandarin: 海棠, [xaɪ˧˩˧ tʰɑŋ˧˥]) was contributed by China and refers to the crabapple tree (Malus spectabilis) in Mandarin.) Later that day, the storm became better organized; however, its low-level circulation center (LLCC) would become fully exposed due to moderate vertical wind shear from nearby Typhoon Nesat, which prevented further strengthening. Haitang would significantly slow down, meandering towards Vietnam at a speed of 3 knots (5.6 km/h; 3.5 mph). However, in the night of September 26, Haitang would rapidly accelerate westwards, later making landfall near Hue, Vietnam. Despite some bursts of convection, both land interaction and vertical wind shear would cause the system to weaken into a tropical depression, resulting in the JTWC issuing its last advisory on Haitang at 21:00 UTC that day. The JMA would still track Haitang until it degenerated into a remnant low in Vietnam early on September 27.

== Preparations and impacts ==
=== Vietnam ===
The national carrier of Vietnam, Vietnam Airlines, would cancel 36 flights throughout September 26–27 due to the threat posed by the cyclone. As Haitang impacted Vietnam, it would cause flash flooding throughout the nation's central provinces. Waters in the Kiến Giang, Bo, and Huong rivers rose to record levels and in Hue City, low-lying areas were inundated, resulting in the city's residents using boats for transport. Haitang would cause seven fatalities, all in Vietnam, and cause four others to be missing as well. Haitang would damage 128 homes, also flooding around 5000 hectares of crops.

=== Thailand ===
In Thailand, the remnants of Haitang would produce torrential rains throughout most of the nation, contributing to the 2011 Thailand floods. The Thai Meteorological Department would advise people to refrain from going out to sea.

== See also ==
- Weather of 2011
- Tropical cyclones in 2011
- Tropical Storm Talas (2017) - Impacted many of the same places as Haitang did.
