= 2007 Pacific typhoon season =

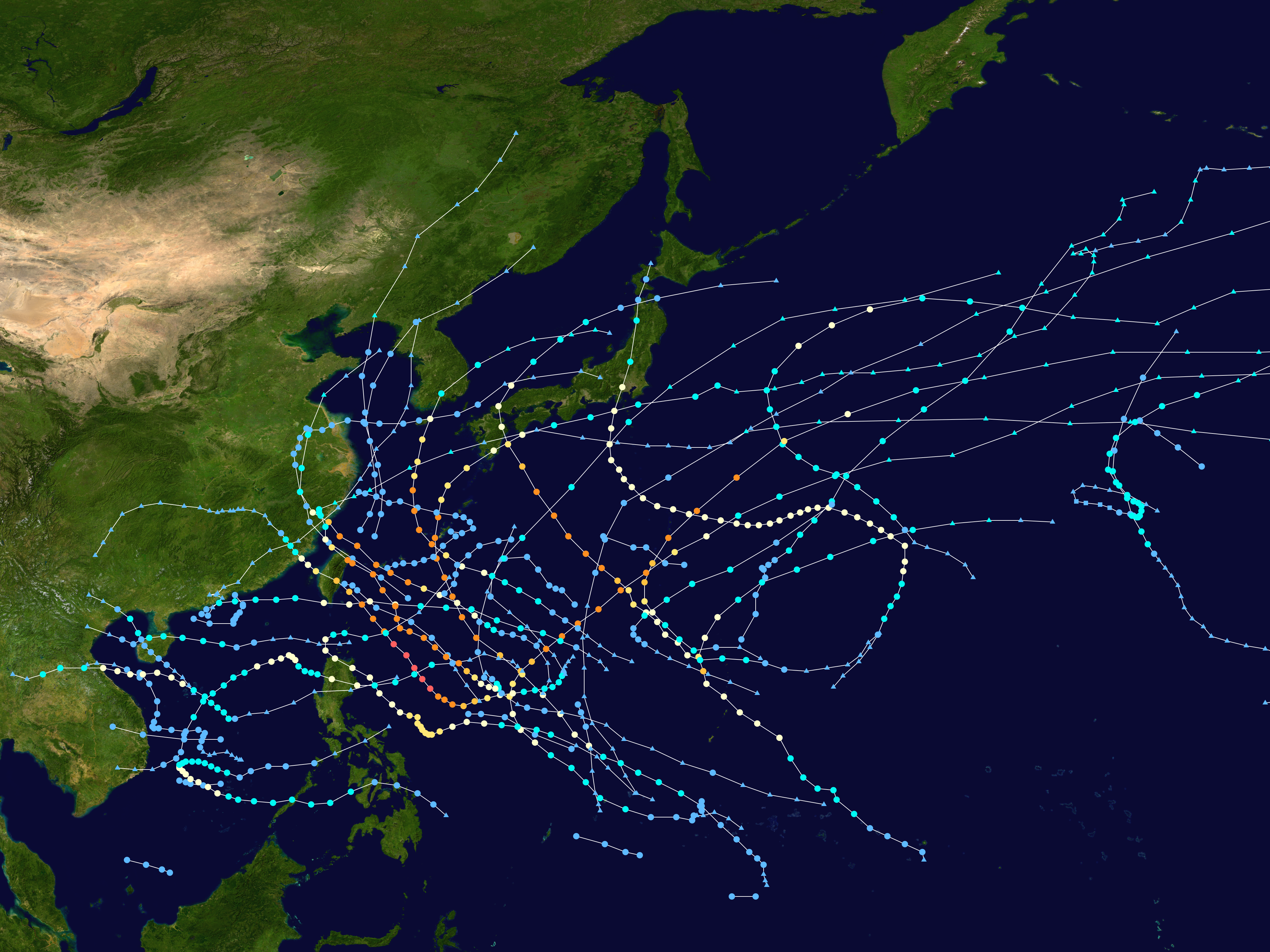
- Season summary map

Seasonal boundaries
- First system formed: January 5, 2007
- Last system dissipated: November 29, 2007

Strongest storm
- Name: Sepat
  - Maximum winds: 205 km/h (125 mph) (10-minute sustained)
  - Lowest pressure: 910 hPa (mbar)

Seasonal statistics
- Total depressions: 44, 1 unofficial
- Total storms: 24
- Typhoons: 14
- Very strong typhoons: 8
- Violent typhoons: 2
- Total fatalities: 449 total
- Total damage: $6.22 billion (2007 USD)

Related articles
- Timeline of the 2007 Pacific typhoon season; 2007 Atlantic hurricane season; 2007 Pacific hurricane season; 2007 North Indian Ocean cyclone season

The 2007 Pacific typhoon season was a below average season which featured 24 named storms, fourteen typhoons, and five super typhoons. It was an event in the annual cycle of tropical cyclone formation, in which tropical cyclones form in the western Pacific Ocean. The season ran throughout 2007, though most tropical cyclones typically develop between May and November. The season's first named typhoon, Kong-rey, developed on March 30, while the season's last named storm, Mitag, dissipated on November 27. The season's second typhoon, Yutu, reached typhoon status on May 18, and became the first super typhoon (Note: A super typhoon is an unofficial category used by the Joint Typhoon Warning Center (JTWC) for a typhoon with winds of at least 240 km/h (150 mph)) of the year on the next day.

The scope of this article is limited to the Pacific Ocean, to the north of the equator between 100°E and the 180th meridian. Within the northwestern Pacific Ocean, there are two separate agencies that assign names to tropical cyclones, which can often result in a cyclone having two names. The Japan Meteorological Agency (JMA) will name a tropical cyclone should it be judged to have 10-minute sustained wind speeds of at least 65 km/h (40 mph) anywhere in the basin. PAGASA assigns unofficial names to tropical cyclones which move into or form as a tropical depression in their area of responsibility, located between 115°E–135°E and between 5°N–25°N, regardless of whether or not a tropical cyclone has already been given a name by the JMA. Tropical depressions that are monitored by the United States' Joint Typhoon Warning Center (JTWC) are given a numerical designation with a "W" suffix.

== Seasonal forecasts ==
TSR forecasts Date	Tropical storms	Total Typhoons	Intense TCs	ACE	Ref
Average (1965–2006)	26.6	16.8	8.6	305	
March 6, 2007	24.3	14.8	7.3	265	
May 3, 2007	26.8	16.9	7.9	281	
June 5, 2007	26.8	16.9	7.5	269	
July 4, 2007	26.8	16.9	8.7	306	
August 7, 2007	26.8	16.9	8.3	294	
Other forecasts Date	Forecast Center	TCs	Tropical storms	Typhoons	Ref
January 29, 2007	PAGASA	15–19	------	------	
April 23, 2007	Hong Kong	28	25	14	
June 24, 2007	Hong Kong	27	24	14	
	Forecast Center	Tropical cyclones	Tropical storms	Typhoons	Ref
Actual activity:	JMA	44	24	14	
Actual activity:	JTWC	27	23	15	
Actual activity:	PAGASA	13	13	9	

=== City University of Hong Kong ===
Since the 2000 typhoon season, the Laboratory for Atmospheric Research (LAR), of the City University of Hong Kong have issued forecasts of activity for each upcoming typhoon season. Forecasts were released in April and June predicting how many tropical cyclones, tropical storms, and typhoons there will be during the season. During the season, the LAR is predicting a below average season with fewer than usual tropical cyclones. In its April forecast, the LAR predicted that 28 tropical cyclones, 25 tropical storms, and 14 typhoons before in its June forecast predicting 27 tropical cyclones, 24 tropical storms and 14 typhoons.

=== Tropical Storm Risk Consortium ===
Since the 2000 typhoon season, the Tropical Storm Risk Consortium (TSR) of the University College of London have issued forecasts of activity for each upcoming typhoon season. During 2007, forecasts were released in March, May, June, July and August predicting how many tropical cyclones, tropical storms, typhoons and intense typhoons there will be during a season. (Note: According to the Tropical Storm Risk Consortium, an intense typhoon is a typhoon that has 1-minute winds of at least 175 km/h (110 mph).) In its March forecast, TSR predicted that the season would be about 15% below average with 24 tropical storms, 15 typhoons and 7 intense typhoons. In its May forecast, TSR predicted that the season would now be near normal with 27 tropical storms, 17 typhoons and 8 intense typhoons forming during the season. Within their June July and August forecasts, TSR forecasted the season would be near normal with 27 tropical storms and 17 typhoons forming.

=== National meteorological service predictions ===
The Philippine Atmospheric, Geophysical and Astronomical Services Administration (PAGASA), reported on January 27, 2007, that they were expecting 15–19 tropical cyclones to move through their area of responsibility, during the upcoming typhoon season. They also predicted that due to the weak El Niño event that was occurring the first tropical cyclone wouldn't move through their area of responsibility until May.

== Seasonal summary ==
According to PAGASA, the Philippines had its second quietest season with 14 named storms since the 1998 season, with the 2002 and 2010 being the most quiet season.

== Systems ==
=== Typhoon Kong-rey ===
- Typhoon (JMA)
- Category 3 typhoon (SSHWS)
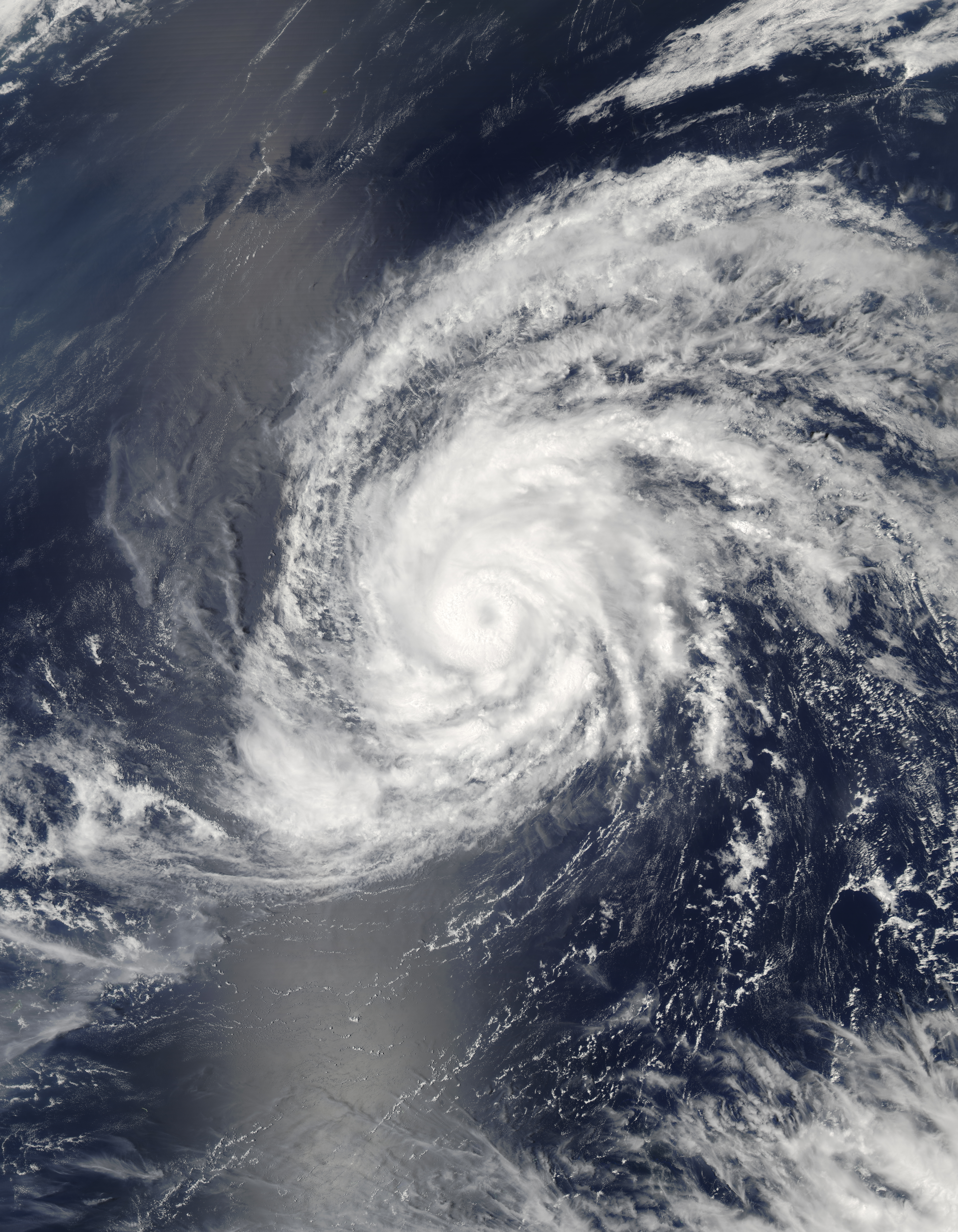
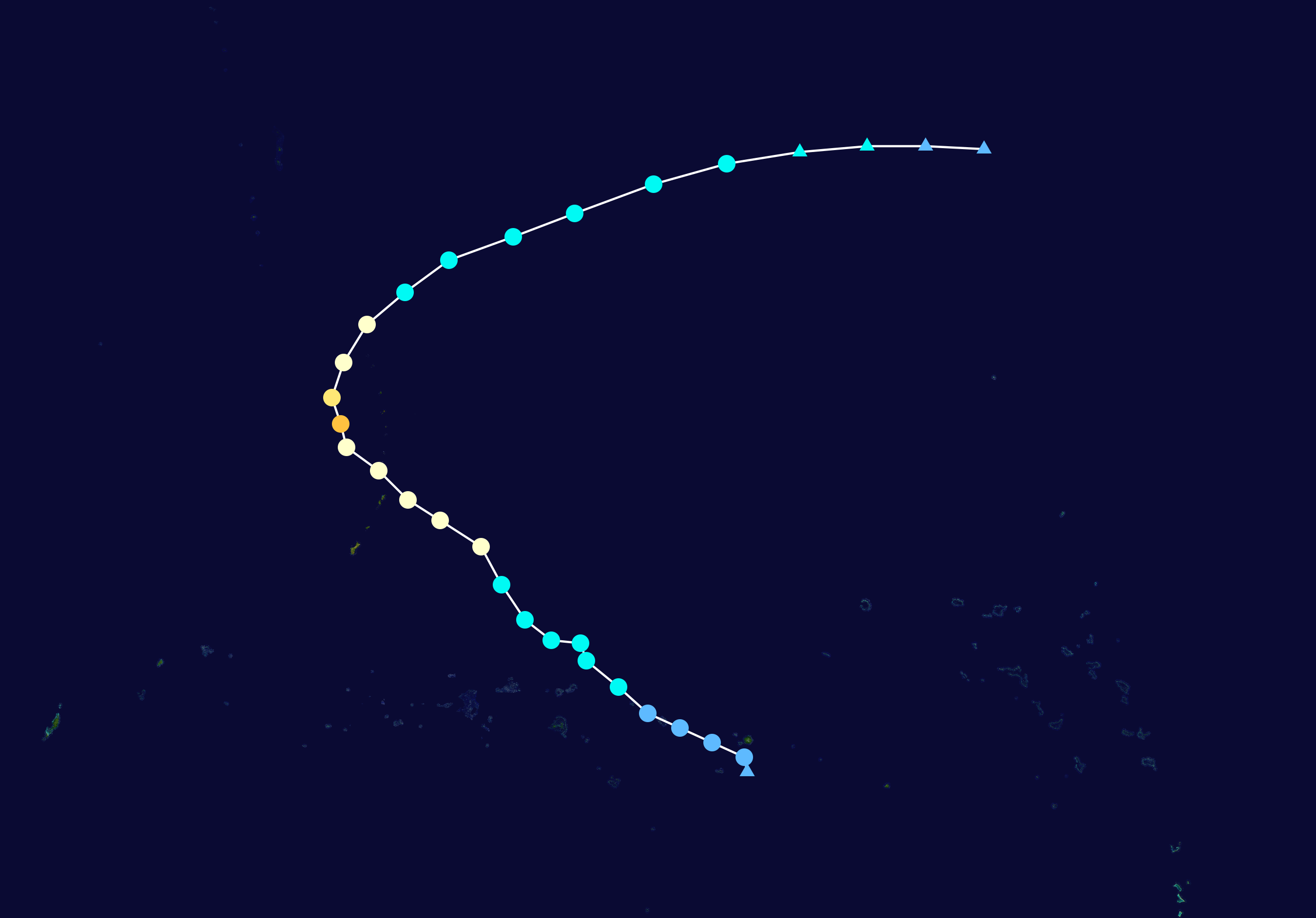
- Duration: March 30 – April 6
- Peak intensity: 150 km/h (90 mph) (10-min); 960 hPa (mbar)

On March 26, the JTWC identified a broad area of low pressure in the Western North Pacific. It moved west-northwestward over the next few days, slowly gaining organization. According to the Japan Meteorological Agency, it became a tropical depression on March 30. The next day, the Joint Typhoon Warning Center issued a Tropical Cyclone Formation Alert due to an increased consolidation of the low-level circulation of the system. The JTWC issued its first warning on Tropical Depression 01W late that evening local time. As it continued to strengthen, the JTWC upgraded it to a tropical storm, the first of the season. The JMA followed suit, and named the system Kong-rey. The name was submitted by Cambodia, and refers to a character in a Khmer legend, which is also the name of a mountain.

Kong-rey continued to organize and intensified into a severe tropical storm early the next morning local time. The JTWC then upgraded it to a typhoon on April 2. As the system took a more poleward track towards the Northern Mariana Islands, the National Weather Service office in Guam noted that damaging winds were now not expected on the island. Elsewhere in the Marianas, preparations were made and flights were cancelled in anticipation of the typhoon. Kong-rey passed through the islands in the early hours of the morning on April 3 local time. The JMA upgraded Kong-rey to a typhoon later that afternoon, as it developed an eye. It strengthened slightly further before encountering wind shear and colder sea surface temperatures and was downgraded back to a severe tropical storm on April 4. As Kong-rey accelerated towards the northeast, it began undergoing extratropical transition early on April 5 and the JTWC issued its final warning. The JMA issued its final warning on the morning of April 6 after it had completed extratropical transition. No casualties or major damage was reported.

=== Typhoon Yutu (Amang) ===
- Very strong typhoon (JMA)
- Category 4 super typhoon (SSHWS)
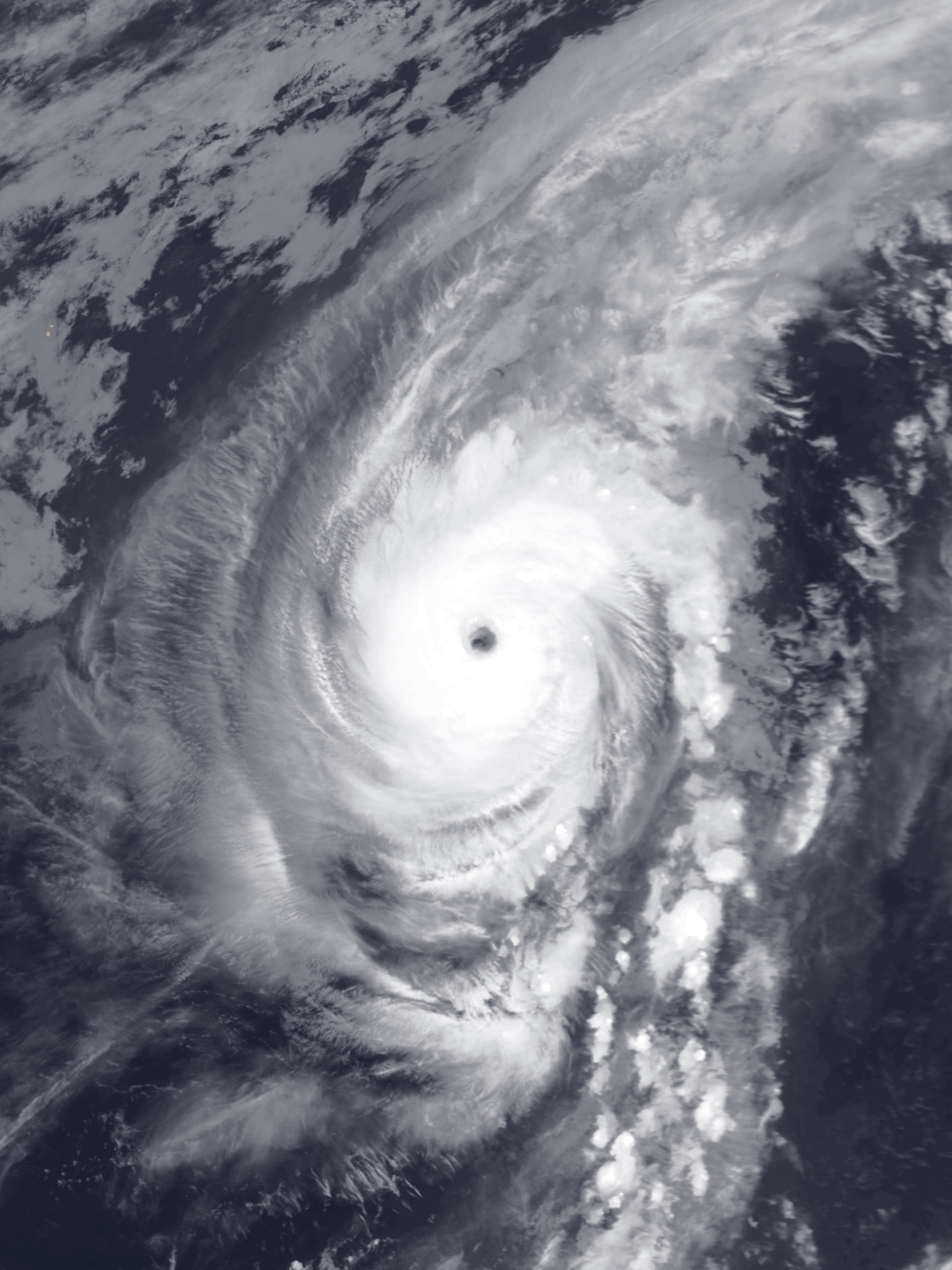
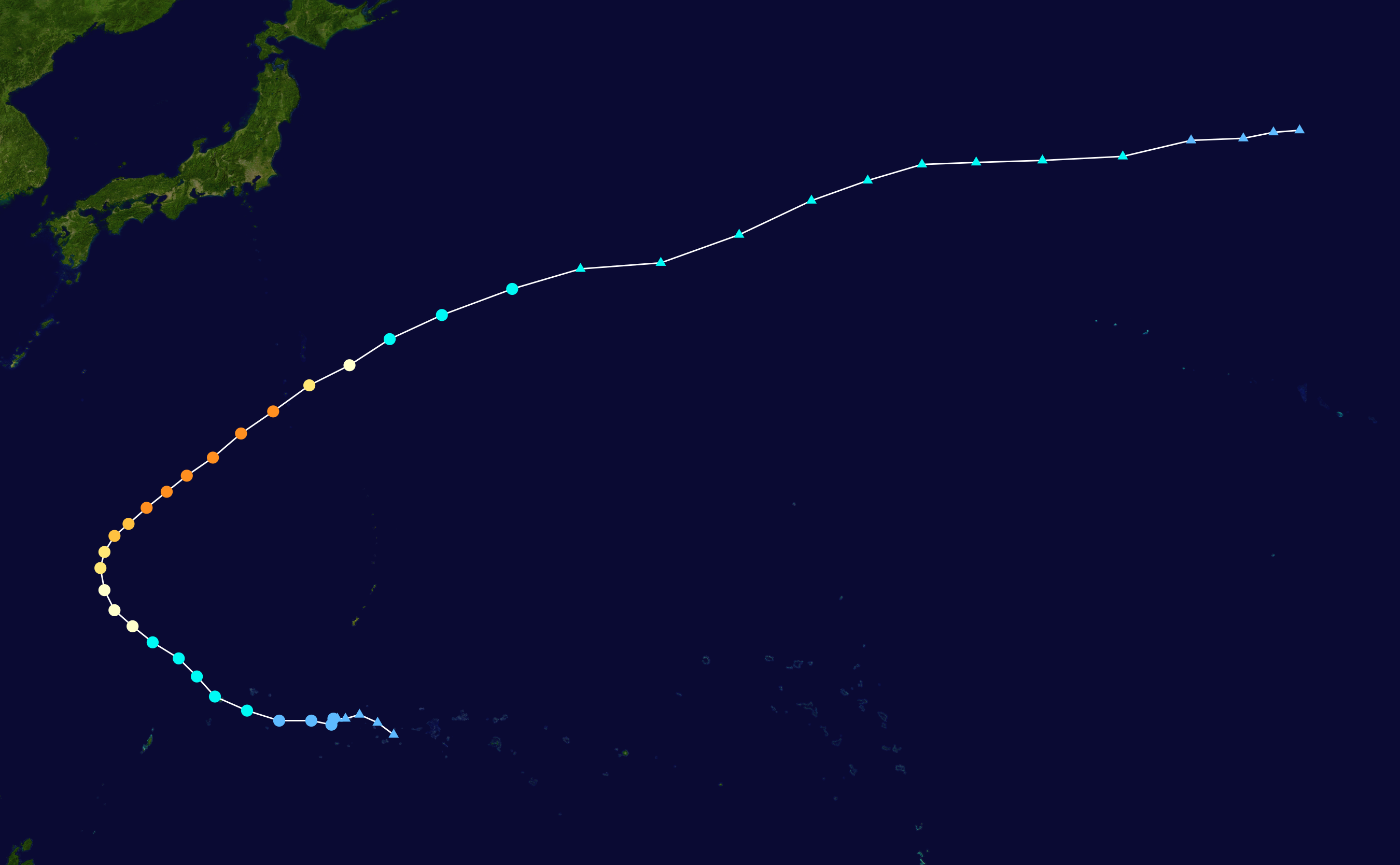
- Duration: May 17 – May 23
- Peak intensity: 175 km/h (110 mph) (10-min); 935 hPa (mbar)

On May 15, a significant consolidation of organisation in a tropical disturbance located south-southeast of Guam led to Dvorak technique numbers equating to a windspeed of 45 knots (83 km/h) from the Air Force Weather Agency. Later that day, the Japan Meteorological Agency designated the system a tropical depression, and the Joint Typhoon Warning Center issued a Tropical Cyclone Formation Alert. The next day, the JMA began issuing full advisories on the tropical depression. It developed slowly, resulting in a reissuance of the TCFA later that day. In this second TCFA, the JTWC noted "an increasingly well-defined" low-level circulation centre. The JTWC upgraded the system to Tropical Depression 02W at 1200 UTC, based on satellite intensity estimates and QuikSCAT. The JMA designated 02W as Tropical Storm Yutu early on May 17, as the system strengthened further. The name 'Yutu' was contributed by China, and refers to a rabbit in a Chinese fable. The JTWC followed suit 3 hours later, upgrading the system to Tropical Storm 02W as it moved quickly westwards, heading for Yap. Tropical storm warnings and watches were put in place for most of the Yap State, but were later cancelled after Yutu passed through quickly.

It then took a northwesterly turn, entered the PAGASA area of responsibility on May 18 as it reached severe tropical storm strength, and was named "Amang". Later that day, the JTWC upgraded it to a typhoon, and identified a "distinct eye feature", and the JMA upgraded the severe tropical storm to a typhoon at 1800 UTC as it continued to intensify. It began to recurve towards Iwo Jima, undergoing rapid intensification, with "enhanced poleward outflow and low vertical wind shear". It reached its peak on the evening of May 20, as a strong Category 4-equivalent typhoon, just short of becoming a super typhoon. Despite moving into cooler waters, its strong poleward outflow helped it to maintain a high intensity, while carrying a 20 nautical mile-wide eye, on the early morning of May 21. It then began to gradually weaken, passing over Okinotorishima and near Iwo Jima that day as it sped off to the northeast. Maximum winds on Iwo Jima occurred around 1500 UTC that day, with 66 knots (122 km/h; 76 mph) sustained gusting to 104 knots (193 km/h; 120 mph), when a minimum central pressure of 976 hPa was recorded. It then started extratropical transition, and the JTWC issued its final warning on the morning of May 22. The JMA issued its last advisory after extratropical transition completed a day later.

=== Tropical Storm Toraji ===
- Tropical storm (JMA)
- Tropical storm (SSHWS)
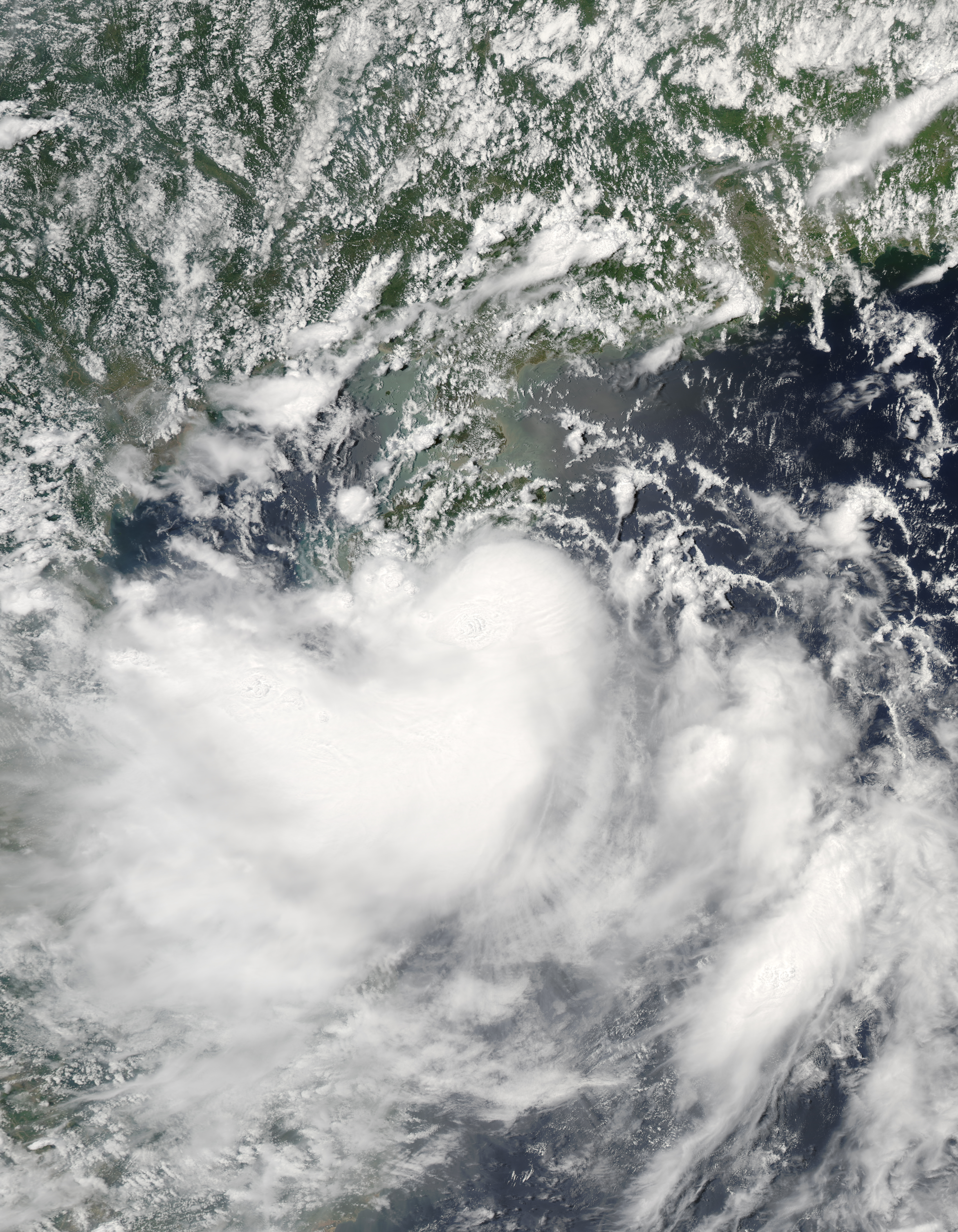
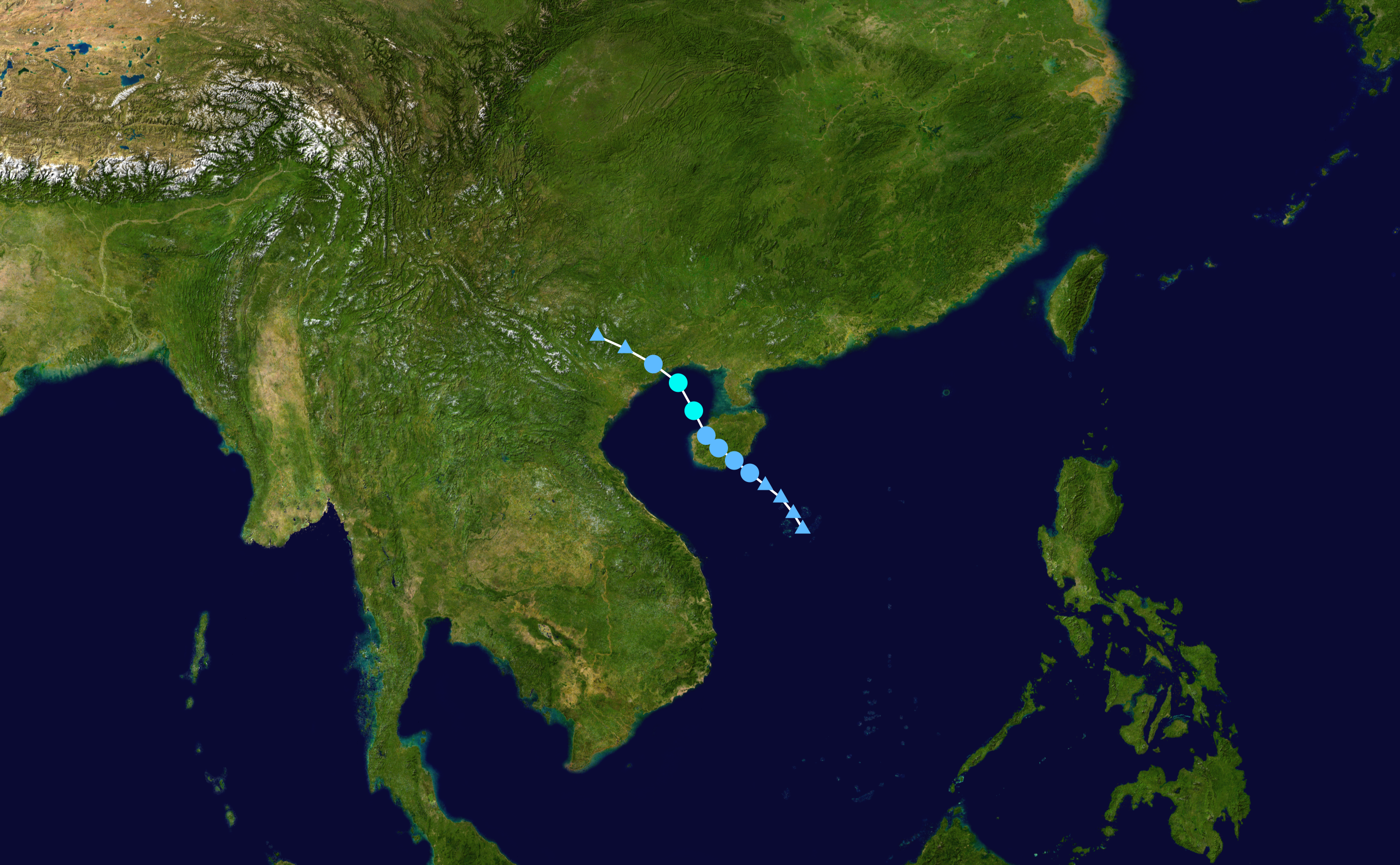
- Duration: July 4 – July 5
- Peak intensity: 65 km/h (40 mph) (10-min); 994 hPa (mbar)

An area of disturbed weather formed in the South China Sea on July 2 and gradually consolidated over the next two days as it moved west-northwestward. A Tropical Cyclone Formation Alert was issued by the Joint Typhoon Warning Center on the morning of July 4, and later that day the disturbance was upgraded straight to a tropical storm just south-east of Hainan Island. It made landfall on the island shortly after. China claimed that a tropical depression formed in the morning on July 2, made landfall in Hainan later that afternoon with maximum sustained winds of 15 metres per second (54 km/h; 34 mph) and deepened to 988hPa before making its second landfall. The Japan Meteorological Agency upgraded the tropical depression to Tropical Storm Toraji on the morning of July 5 while it was in the Gulf of Tonkin, after the centre of the storm had emerged back over water. The name Toraji was contributed by North Korea and refers to the broad bellflower (platycodi radix). Toraji made landfall in Vietnam around 1200 UTC later that evening, having not strengthened much while over the Gulf of Tonkin. The JMA never analysed the storm beyond 994 hPa and minimal tropical storm strength. The JTWC issued its last advisory after landfall, and the JMA followed suit shortly after.

Throughout Guangxi Province, an estimated 1.11 million people were affected by Toraji. Heavy rains produced by the storm inundated an estimated 7,500 hectares of farmland and damaged 1,300 homes. The flooding forced about 147,000 people to evacuate to safer locations. Damages from the storm amounted to ¥73.6 million (US$9.7 million). Several small fishing boats sank off the coast of Vietnam, the fate of the crews are unknown. Several other offshore incidents occurred, including a few collisions resulting in a minor oil spill. Throughout northern areas of the country, an average of 155 mm (6.1 in) of rain fell, leading to flooding and landslides. At least 27 homes were damaged and 13 others were destroyed by the storm, leaving hundreds of millions of Vietnamese đồng in losses. A power station at a military base was damaged during the storm, leaving roughly 40 million (VND; US$2,240).

=== Typhoon Man-yi (Bebeng) ===
- Very strong typhoon (JMA)
- Category 4 super typhoon (SSHWS)
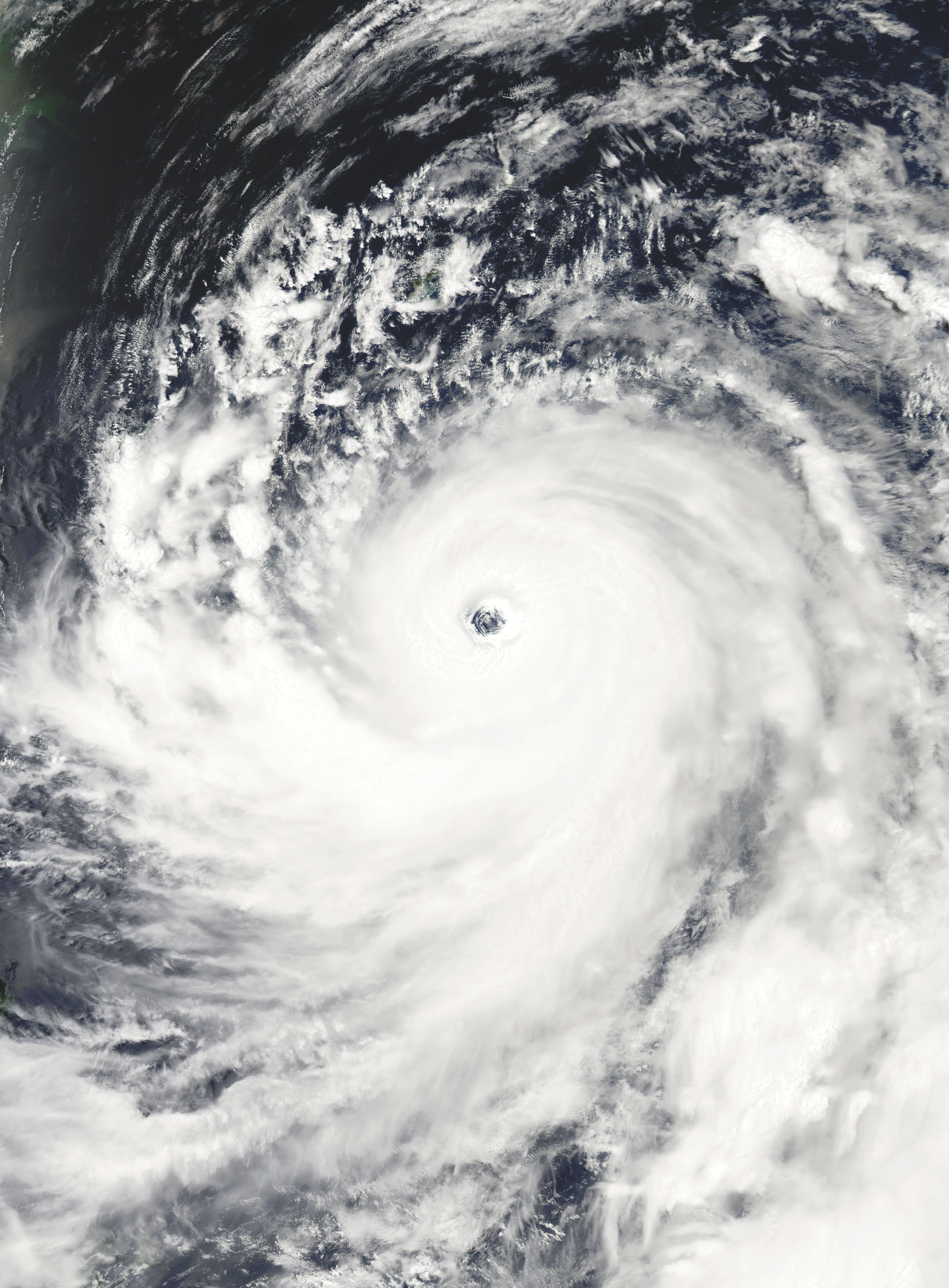
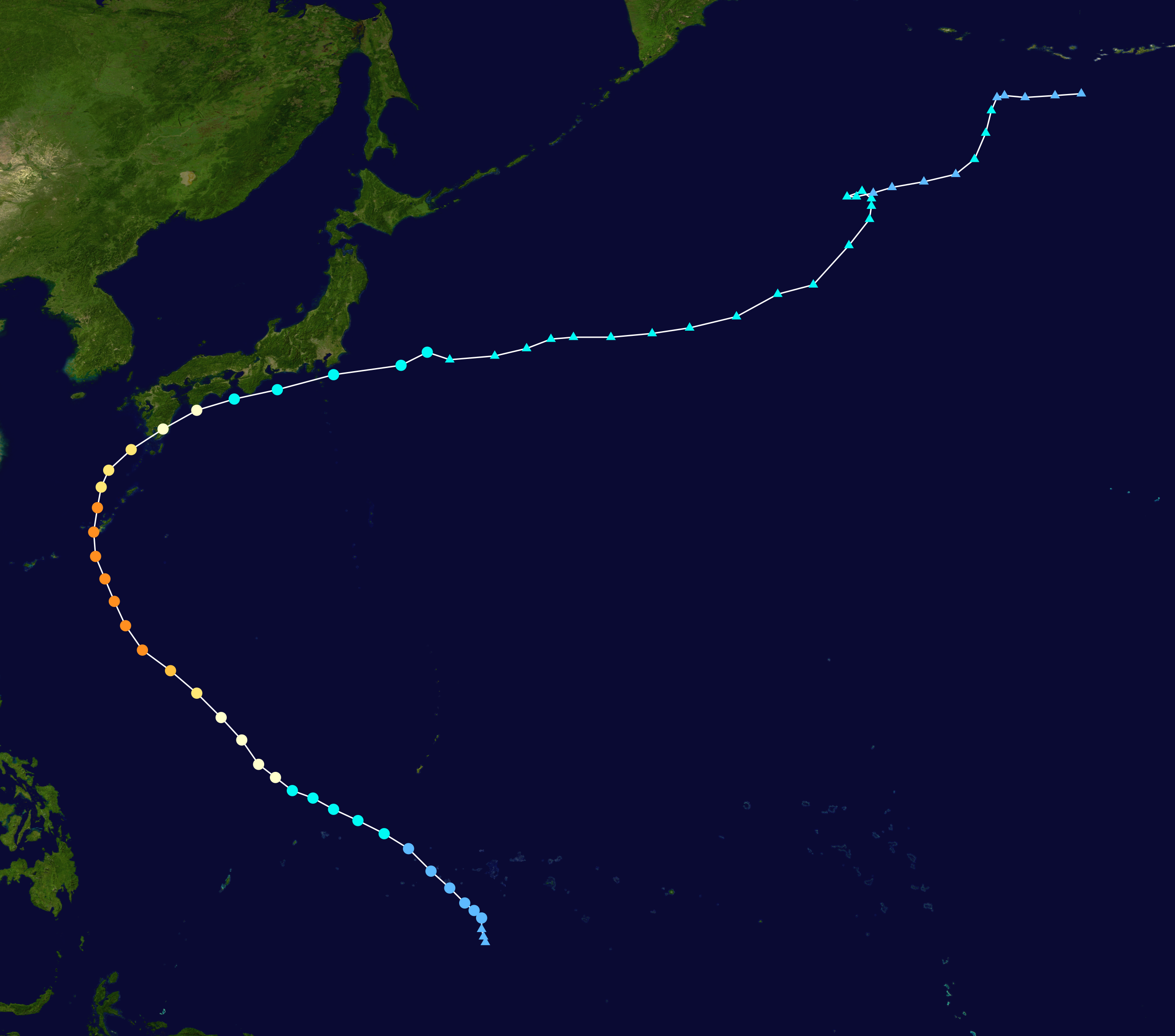
- Duration: July 9 – July 16
- Peak intensity: 185 km/h (115 mph) (10-min); 930 hPa (mbar)

The Joint Typhoon Warning Center began to track an area of disturbed weather just north of the equator on July 4. The circulation centre and surrounding convection started to take shape, although the system was in a "marginal upper-level environment" with moderate vertical wind shear. Surface pressure drops of less than 0.5 mb (hPa) were observed on July 6, as the system moved westward. Early on July 7, the Japan Meteorological Agency (JMA) listed the system as a weak tropical depression. Hours later, the Joint Typhoon Warning Center (JTWC) issued a Tropical Cyclone Formation Alert, as the system consolidated further with "deep convective banding" and improving upper-level conditions. The JTWC issued its first warning on Tropical Depression 04W later that day, and forecast a gradual intensification, as weak to moderate wind shear and weak poleward outflow balanced the effect of high ocean heat content. The JMA began issuing full tropical cyclone advisories on the tropical depression at the same time. As the depression gained more organisation, it was upgraded to a tropical storm that night by the JTWC. The JMA finally upgraded it to a tropical storm later that evening as the large system consolidated, naming it Man-yi. The name "Man-yi" was contributed by Hong Kong, and is the Chinese name of a strait turned reservoir (the High Island Reservoir). Man-yi continued to organize and became a severe tropical storm on July 9, when downed electricity lines caused widespread power outages on Guam. Tropical storm warnings and typhoon watches were put in place for most of Yap State at some point during the storm. Strong waves from the typhoon capsized a ship 375 miles (604 km) to the northwest of Guam, killing three and leaving six missing. The JTWC upgraded the storm to a typhoon on the afternoon of July 10, based on Dvorak technique satellite intensity estimates of 65 knots (120 km/h) by both the JMA and the JTWC. Early the next day, the system entered the Philippine Area of Responsibility and was named "Bebeng" by PAGASA. At the same time, the JMA upgraded Man-yi to a typhoon.

Moving over warmer waters, Man-yi underwent rapid deepening late on July 11 and early on July 12 as it churned towards Okinawa in Japan. The United States Military upgraded the Tropical Cyclone Condition of Readiness (TCCOR) levels for Kantō, Yokosuka, Sasebo and Okinawa on the afternoon of July 12 as Man-yi neared the islands. Man-yi was upgraded twice to super-typhoon strength over the next day as it passed through the prefecture, with a 1-minute peak of 155 mph (249 km/h). The passage of Man-yi resulted in 37 injuries and widespread power outages in Okinawa. The TCCOR level for Okinawa was downgraded to 1R (recovery) on July 13 while Kantō, Yokosuka and Sasebo's levels were all upgraded in anticipation of the typhoon. Man-yi made brief landfall in Kagoshima Prefecture on Kyūshū early the next day before turning to the east and making brief landfalls in Kōchi Prefecture on Shikoku and in Wakayama Prefecture on Honshū. As it interacted with land and started to undergo extratropical transition, the typhoon weakened and was downgraded to a tropical storm by the JTWC and a severe tropical storm by the JMA. It became extratropical on July 15 according to the JTWC and hence it issued its final advisory. The JMA issued its final advisory two days later.

=== Typhoon Usagi ===
- Very strong typhoon (JMA)
- Category 4 typhoon (SSHWS)
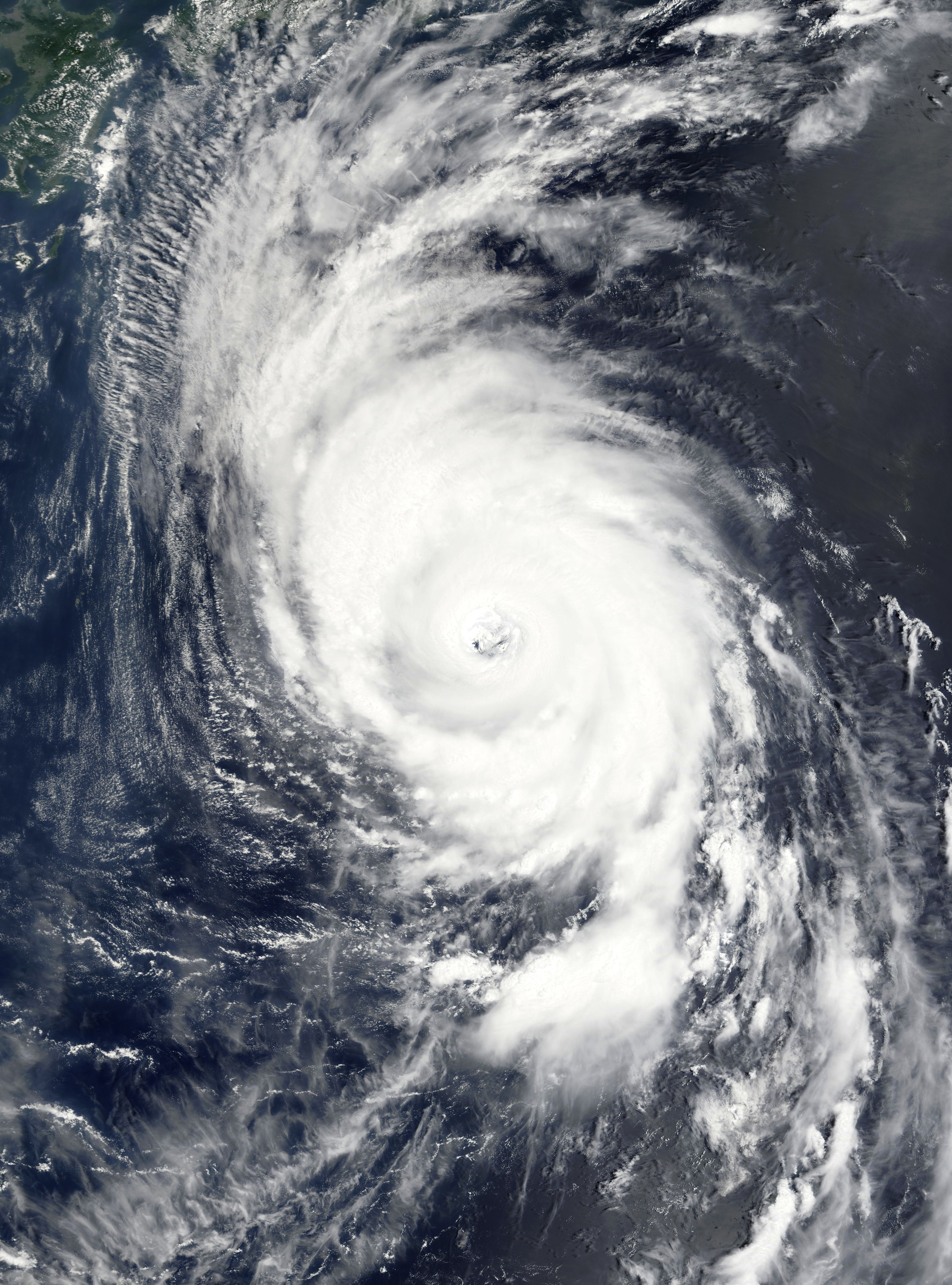
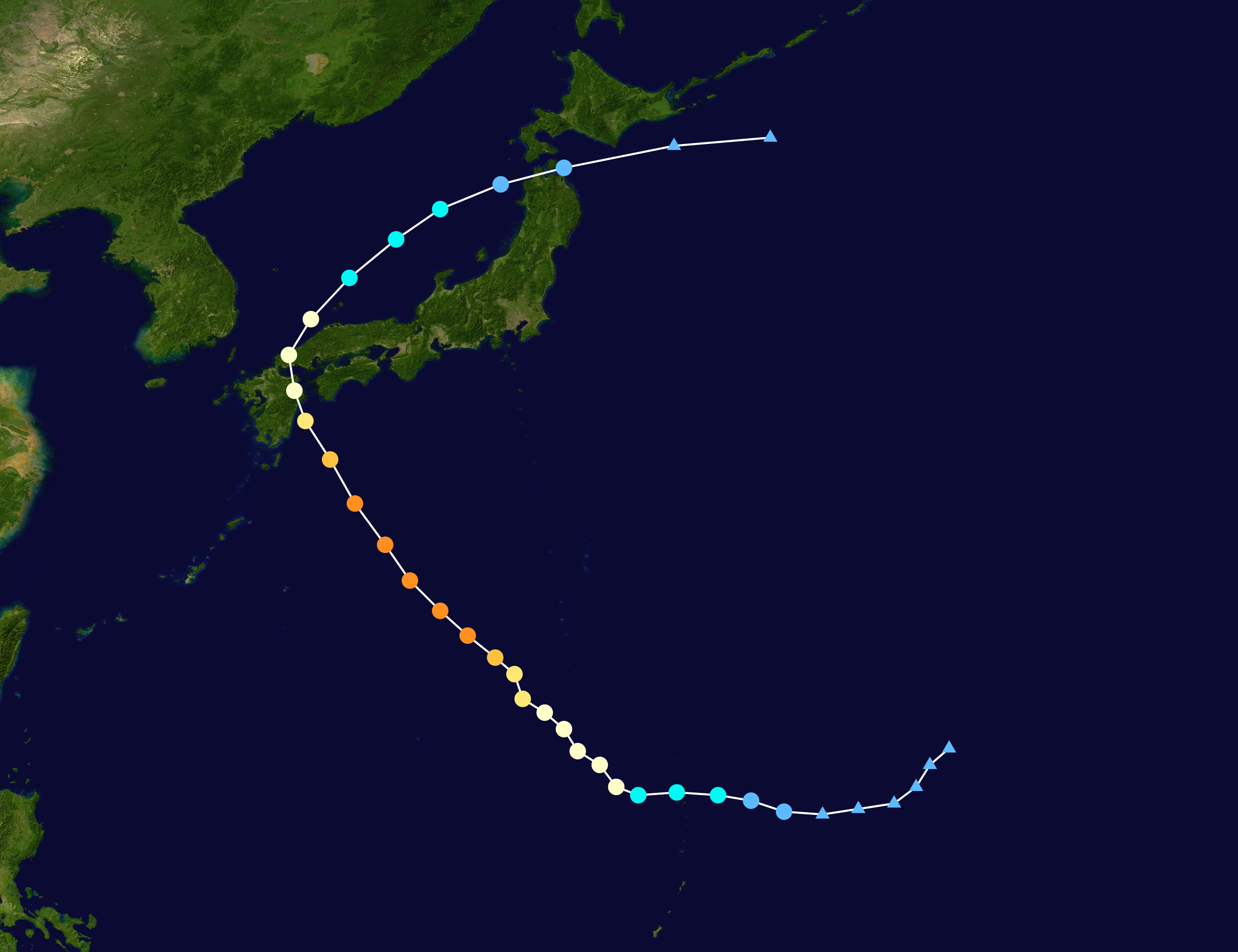
- Duration: July 27 – August 4
- Peak intensity: 165 km/h (105 mph) (10-min); 945 hPa (mbar)

On July 26, the Joint Typhoon Warning Center identified an area of disturbed weather east of the Mariana Islands. This area moved westward and increased in organization, and the Joint Typhoon Warning Center issued a Tropical Cyclone Formation Alert on the system on July 27. The Japan Meteorological Agency designated the system a tropical depression later that day. The next day, the JMA began issuing advisories on the depression, and the JTWC followed suit, designating it Tropical Depression 05W.

The system quickly strengthened as it approached the Mariana Islands, and the JTWC upgraded it to a tropical storm six hours later. The JMA did so early on July 29, designating the system as Tropical Storm Usagi. The name Usagi was contributed by Japan, and means "rabbit" in Japanese. The National Weather Service office in Guam issued tropical storm warnings for Pagan Island and Agrihan in the Northern Marianas shortly after the system was upgraded.

Usagi passed between Pagan and Agrihan later on July 29, and began to quickly strengthen. The JTWC upgraded it to a typhoon later that day, citing Dvorak technique numbers indicating an estimate of 65 knots (120 km/h; 75 mph) and a developing eye. The system gradually turned toward the northwest, and the JMA upgraded it to a severe tropical storm early on July 30, and then to a typhoon on July 31 as it passed to the south of Iwo Jima. Usagi moved northwest over warm waters, reaching peak intensity on August 1 before weakening due to cooling sea surface temperatures and increasing wind shear as it approached Kyūshū. Usagi made landfall on August 2 near Nobeoka, Miyazaki as a rapidly weakening typhoon, and it was downgraded to a severe tropical storm shortly after. The system continued weakening rapidly as it moved across Kyūshū and Honshū, and the JMA downgraded it to a tropical storm later that day.

The JTWC downgraded the system to a tropical storm late on August 2 and issued its last advisory early on August 3 as it began to undergo extratropical transition. Usagi then made further landfalls on northern Honshū in Aomori Prefecture before becoming fully extratropical on August 4, leading the JMA to stop advisories. Usagi was responsible for 18 injuries in Kyūshū.

=== Tropical Depression 06W ===
- Tropical depression (JMA)
- Tropical depression (SSHWS)
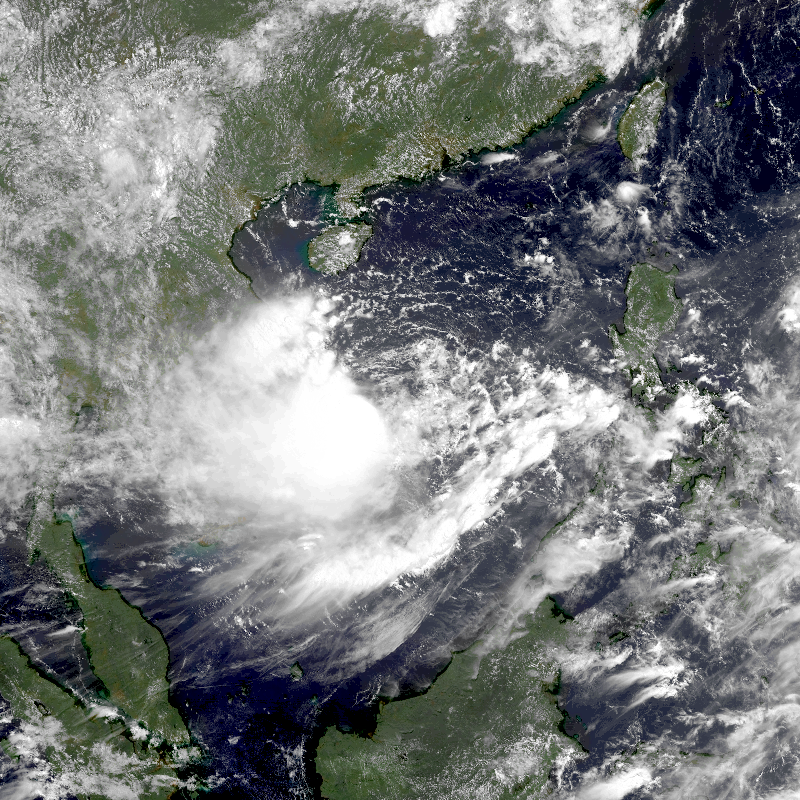
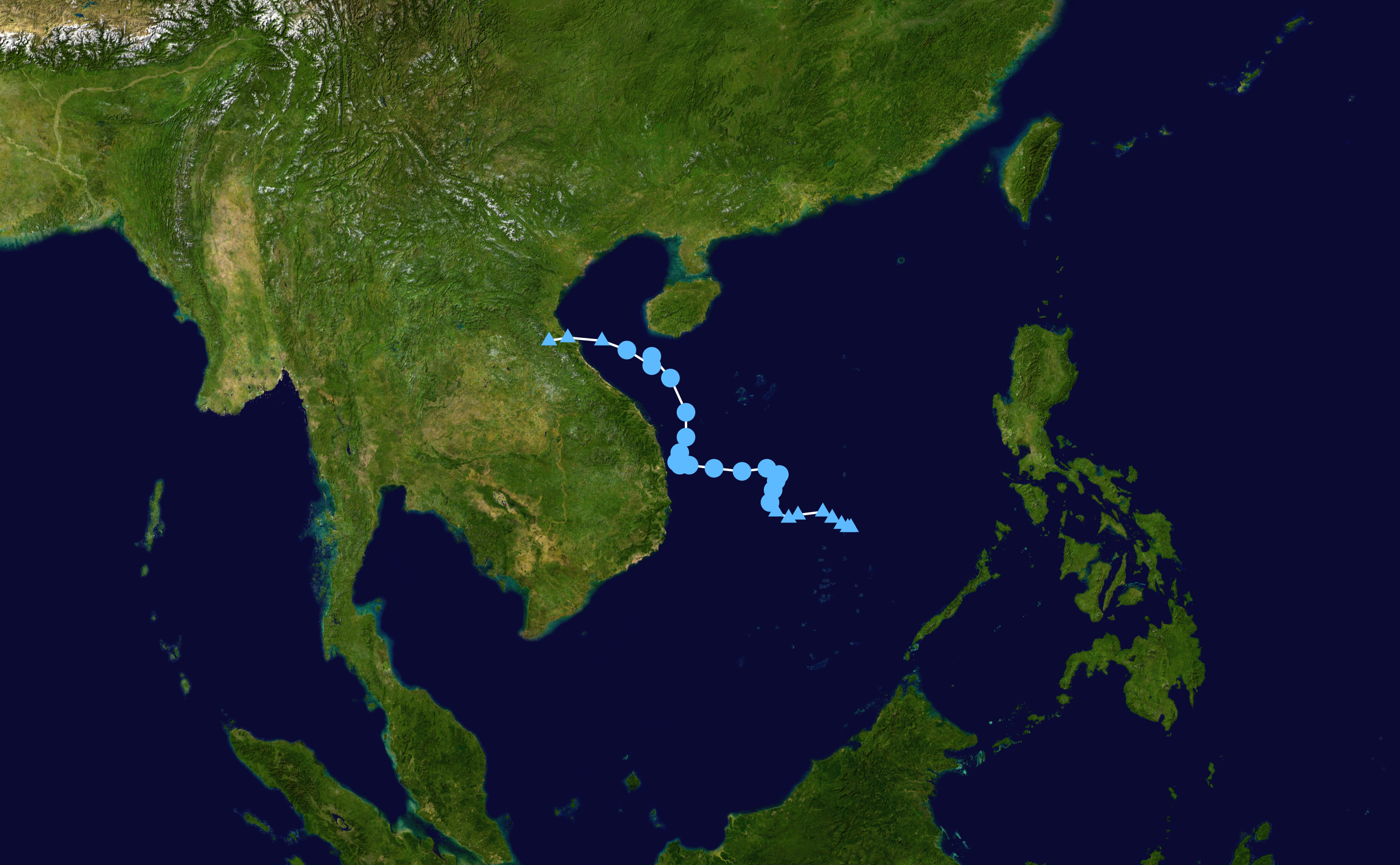
- Duration: August 2 – August 8
- Peak intensity: 55 km/h (35 mph) (10-min); 994 hPa (mbar)

An area of disturbed weather developed in the South China Sea on July 31. Despite strong wind shear in the area, the system gradually increased in organization as it remained nearly stationary, and the Joint Typhoon Warning Center issued a Tropical Cyclone Formation Alert on the system on August 2. The JTWC classified the system as Tropical Depression 06W shortly after, with the JMA designating it a tropical depression at the same time. Despite strong wind shear in the area, the system slowly intensified as it meandered along the coast of Vietnam, and the JTWC upgraded it to a tropical storm early on August 4. However, later that day, the JTWC downgraded the storm back to a depression due to the loss of most of the convection.

At least 60 people died in Vietnam due to extensive floods. Total rainfall from 06W in Vietnam throughout the course of the storm was over 24 inches (610 mm). Total rainfall in Hainan during the passage of the tropical storm was 9.1 inches (230 mm). In Thailand, the remnants of the storm lead to two casualties and about 272,757,962 Baht ($7.5 million US$) in damage.

=== Typhoon Pabuk (Chedeng) ===
- Typhoon (JMA)
- Category 1 typhoon (SSHWS)
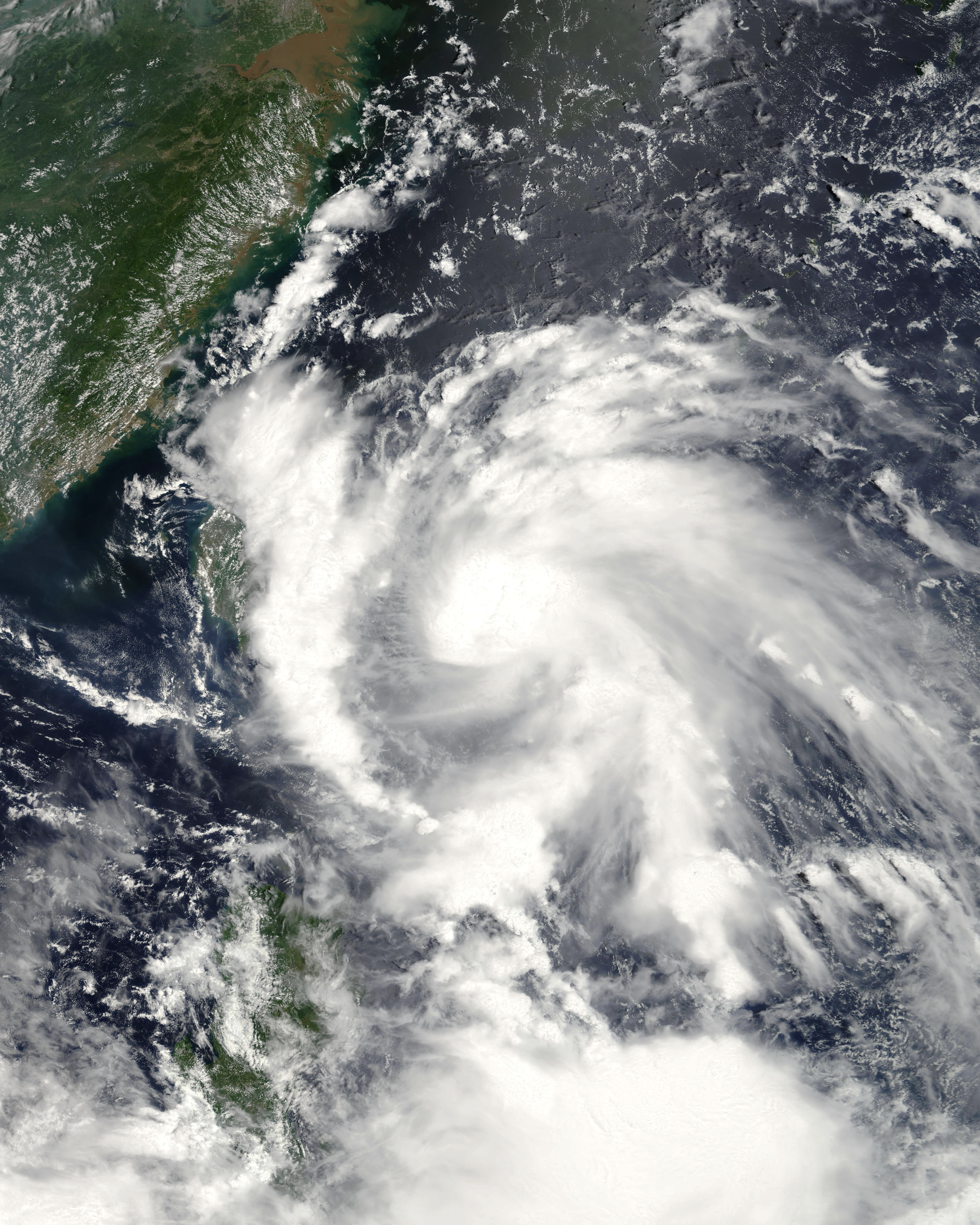
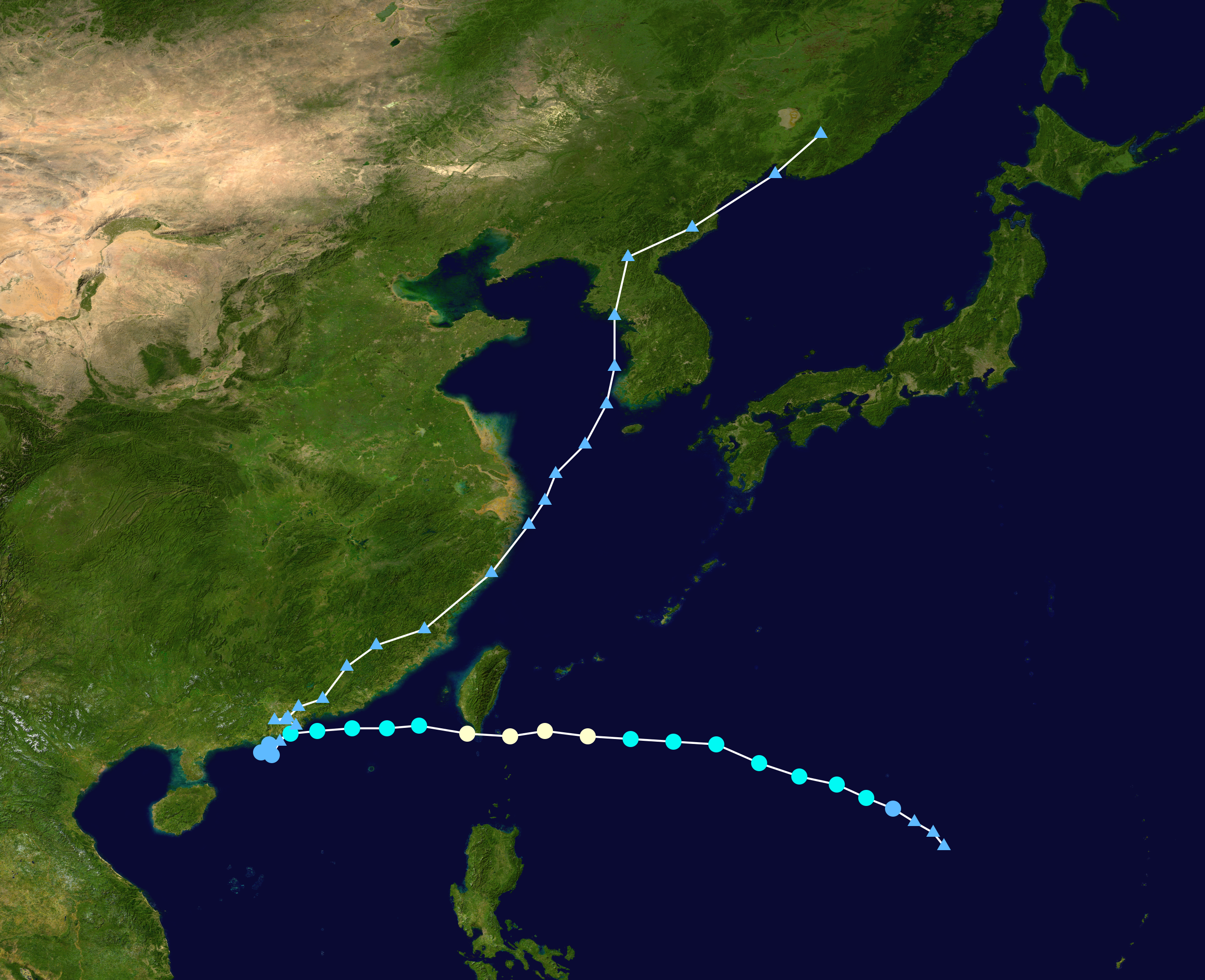
- Duration: August 4 – August 14
- Peak intensity: 120 km/h (75 mph) (10-min); 975 hPa (mbar)

A tropical disturbance developed southeast of Chuuk early on July 31. The system moved west-northwestward over the next several days with little change in organization. On August 4, however, organized convection quickly began to redevelop, and the Japan Meteorological Agency began monitoring it as a tropical depression. The system continued to strengthen, and the Joint Typhoon Warning Center issued a Tropical Cyclone Formation Alert on the system early the next day, noting that its environment was "strongly favorable for development". The Japan Meteorological Agency designated the system Tropical Storm Pabuk shortly after. The name "Pabuk" was submitted by Laos, and refers to a large freshwater fish in the Mekong River. The JTWC designated the system Tropical Storm 07W at about the same time, and on August 5 PAGASA named the system Chedeng. As Pabuk continued to move to the northwest, it gained some organisation as it slowly developed outflow. It was upgraded by the JMA to a severe tropical storm on August 6. Moving westwards towards Taiwan, an area of convection south of Pabuk separated and formed its own low-level circulation. Pabuk's upper-level outflow inhibited this new area of convection. Strengthening slightly, Pabuk was upgraded to a typhoon on the morning of August 7. The JTWC downgraded Pabuk to a tropical storm later that day, with the JMA downgrading Pabuk shortly before landfall. It made landfall in southern Taiwan around 1630 UTC according to Taiwan radar and crossed the southern tip of the Hengchun Peninsula in Pingtung County. The JTWC re-upgraded Pabuk to a typhoon at its next advisory, however, citing a small eye at landfall, before downgrading it to a tropical storm again three hours later.

After passing over Taiwan, Pabuk took aim at Hong Kong. The Hong Kong Observatory and Macau's Meteorological and Geophysical Bureau both hoisted strong wind signal 3 on August 9 as the system passed to the south of Hong Kong. The JMA downgraded the storm to a tropical depression later that day and issued its final public advisory, with the JTWC following suit shortly after. The tropical depression then turned back to the east-northeast on August 10, forcing the HKO to re-issue signal 3. The HKO also warned that winds were expected to strengthen further locally, and that the Hong Kong Education Bureau had suspended all classes for the day. The HKO upgraded Pabuk to a tropical storm and subsequently issued the gale or storm warning signal 8 at 2:30 pm HKT (0630 UTC) later that day as Pabuk moved closer to the territory. This was replaced by signal 3 later that night as Pabuk took another turn in direction and headed west inland into Guangdong. Early next morning, Pabuk resumed a northeasterly track, edging once again closer to the Pearl River Delta before it weakened further and HKO cancelled all signals.

At least 11 people were killed in the Philippines by Pabuk.

=== Tropical Storm Wutip (Dodong) ===
- Tropical storm (JMA)
- Tropical depression (SSHWS)
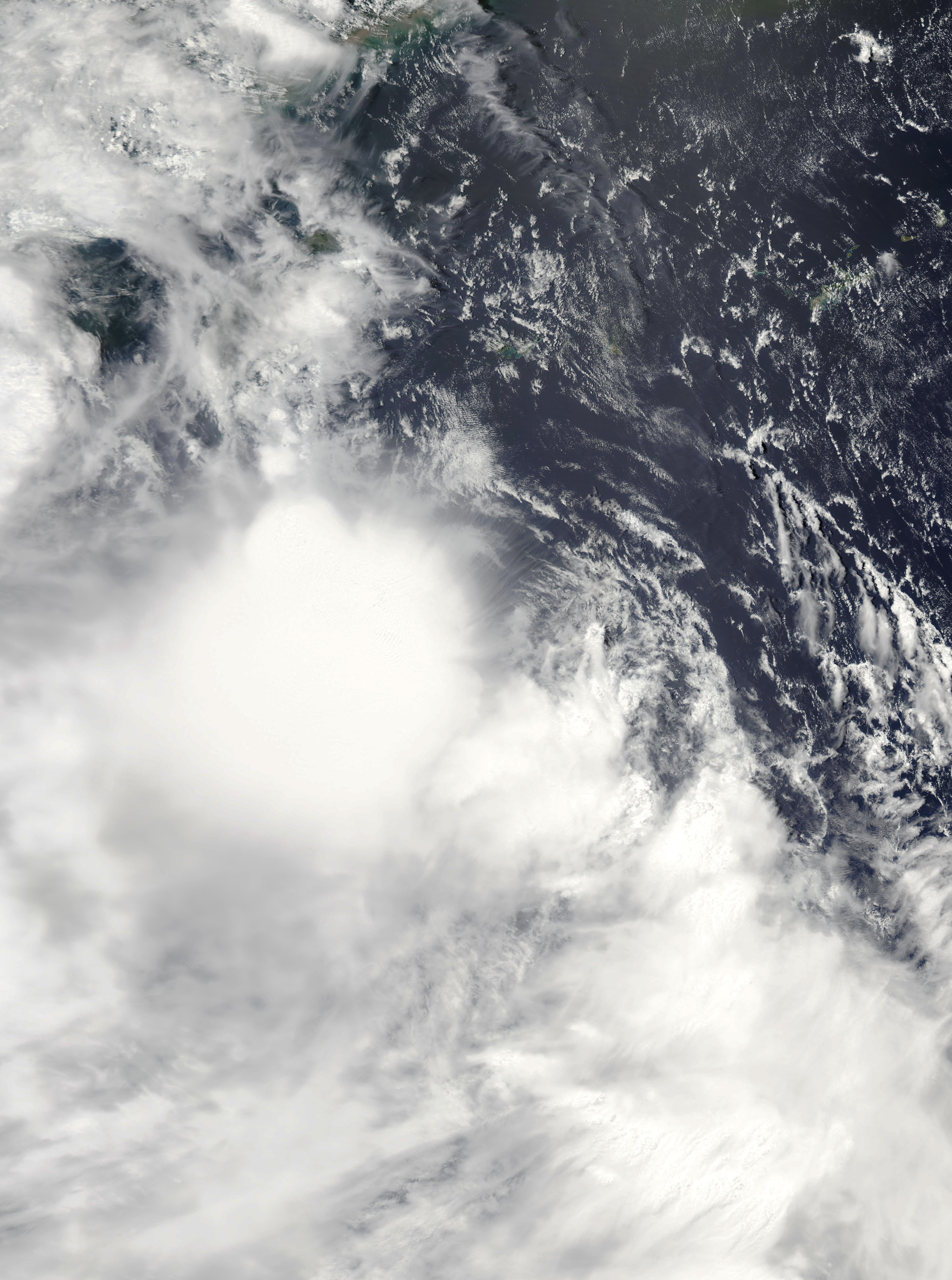
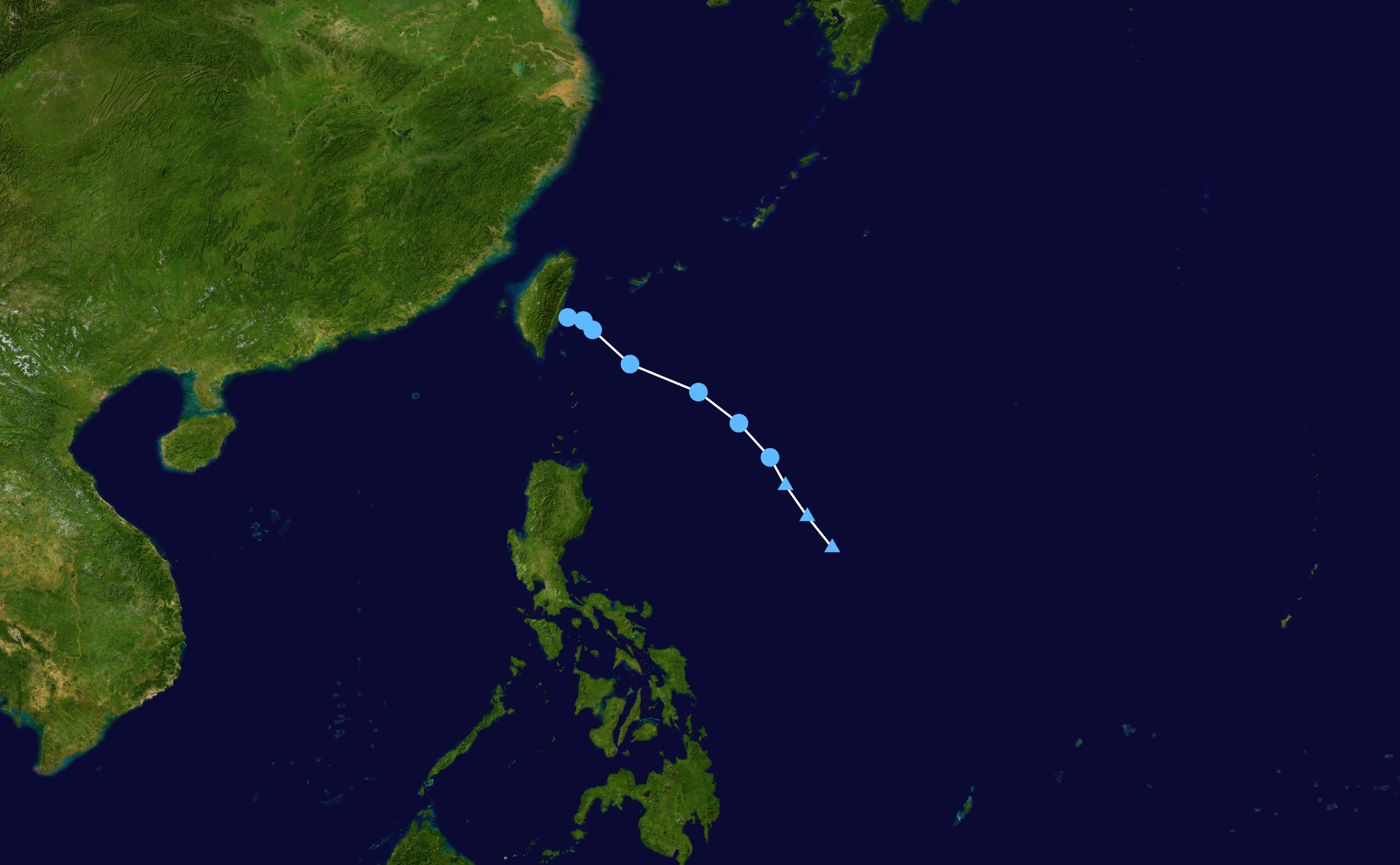
- Duration: August 6 – August 9
- Peak intensity: 65 km/h (40 mph) (10-min); 990 hPa (mbar)

A tropical disturbance developed to the south of the developing Tropical Storm Pabuk on August 5, and was first mentioned by the Joint Typhoon Warning Center in its Significant Tropical Weather Outlook on August 6. The Japan Meteorological Agency designated it a tropical depression later that night. By the next day, although still attached to Pabuk and being inhibited by shearing from an upper-level outflow anticyclone over Pabuk, the JTWC issued a Tropical Cyclone Formation Alert. As Pabuk moved away, the depression gradually strengthened, and the JMA designated it Tropical Storm Wutip early on August 8. The name Wutip was submitted by Macau, and means butterfly. It struggled against land interaction, however, and did not strengthen considerably, remaining poorly organised. The storm quickly weakened, and the JMA issued its last advisory on Wutip early on August 9, downgrading it to a tropical depression. The JTWC issued its last advisory shortly after. Upon being classified a tropical storm, ships within 450 km (280 mi) of the storm were advised to take precautions and those not within that range were urged to avoid it.

Tens of thousands of residents in the northern Philippines took shelter from the storm as there was a high likelihood over severe flooding due to already saturated grounds. Schools throughout the area were canceled for several days due to the storm. The Philippine Atmospheric, Geophysical and Astronomical Services Administration (PAGASA) placed Batanes under storm signal 2 while the Babuyan Islands were under storm signal 1. In Taoyuan County, Taiwan (now Taoyuan City), a level three emergency response warning was put in place as Wutip approached the island. Fourteen flights in and out of Taiwan were canceled due to the approaching storm and all ferry service was canceled.

Previously saturated by Typhoon Pabuk, the outer bands of Wutip produced torrential rains over Luzon, Philippines, triggering numerous landslides and flash flooding. Two people were killed in a landslide in northern Luzon while another was electrocuted in knee-deep flooding in Manila. Widespread street flooding resulted in large traffic jams and numerous road closures. Ten homes were destroyed and another 32 were damaged by Wutip. A total of six people were killed by the storm, three due to electrocution, and seven were injured due to a tornado. A total of 239,292 people were affected by the storm and damages amounted to PHP16.8 million (US$349,000). Following the flooding, the civil defense operations center in the Philippines deployed relief teams supplied with food to assist the affected regions.

=== Typhoon Sepat (Egay) ===
- Violent typhoon (JMA)
- Category 5 super typhoon (SSHWS)
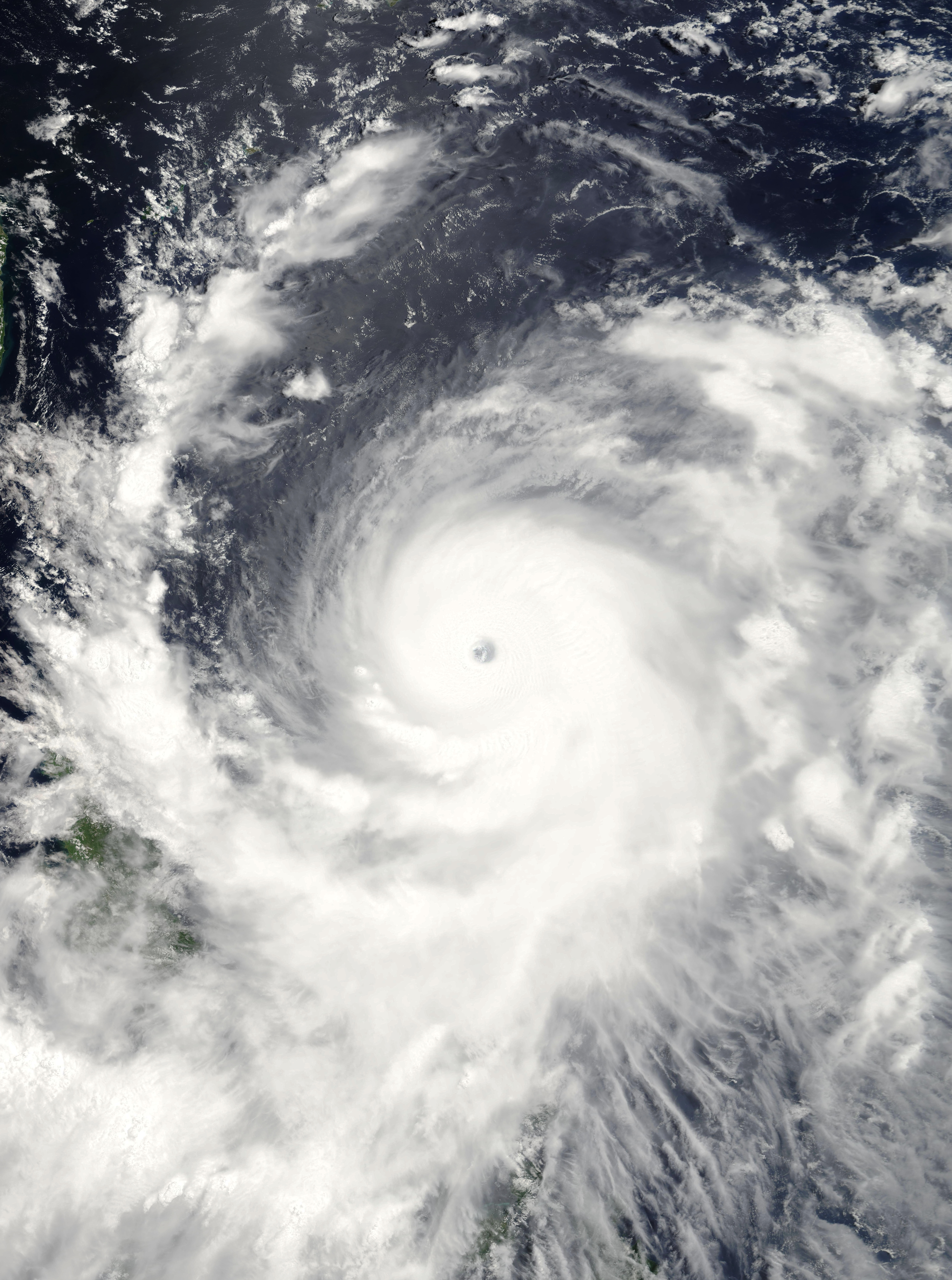
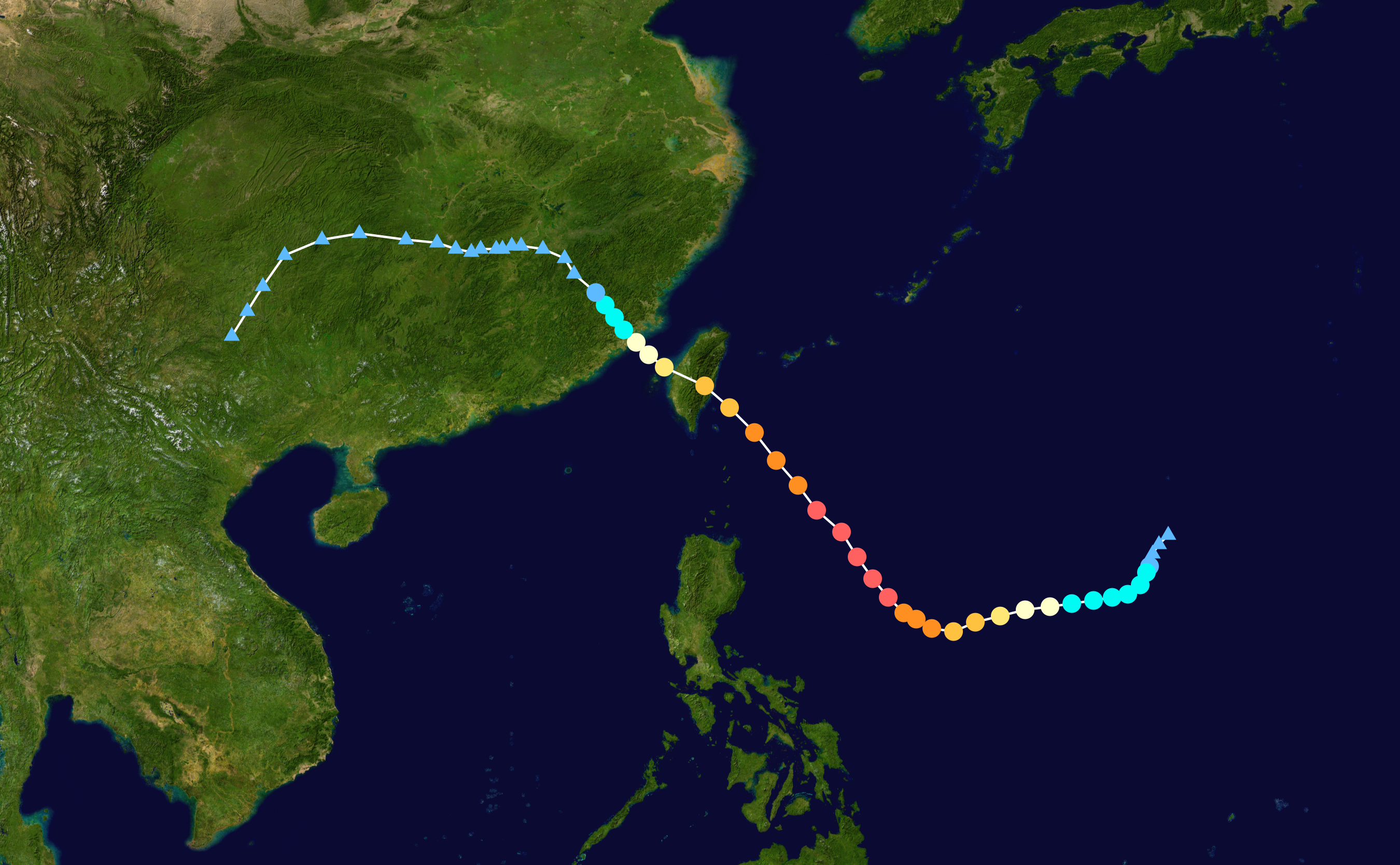
- Duration: August 12 – August 20
- Peak intensity: 205 km/h (125 mph) (10-min); 910 hPa (mbar)

An area of disturbed weather developed west of the Northern Mariana Islands on August 11. Early the next day, the JMA began issuing advisories on the depression, and the JTWC followed suit, designating it Tropical Depression 09W. Twelve hours later, the JTWC upgraded the tropical depression to a tropical storm based on Dvorak technique satellite intensity estimates and the storm exhibiting tightly curved convective bands. An upper-level low helped to reduce wind shear that had been affecting the storm. The JTWC also warned of the possibility of rapid intensification. The JMA upgraded the depression to a tropical storm later that day and named it Sepat, a name contributed by Malaysia referring to a freshwater fish species.

By early on August 13, Sepat had moved into PAGASA's area of responsibility and attained the local name "Egay". The JMA upgraded Sepat to a severe tropical storm shortly after. Late that night, Sepat underwent rapid intensification as expected, and was upgraded by the JTWC to a super typhoon the next morning. Sepat slowed in forward speed and took a turn from a west-southwest motion to a more poleward one. Continuing to intensify, Sepat reached a peak minimum central pressure of 910 hPa on the morning of August 16. High ocean heat content and good equatorward outflow allowed Sepat to maintain its intensity, but an eyewall replacement cycle began later that night, resulting in weakening. It made landfall in eastern Taiwan between Taitung and Hualien on the morning of August 18 local time at around 5 am (2100 UTC August 17) and weakened to a minimal typhoon. After crossing the island, Sepat held on to minimal typhoon intensity before weakening to a severe tropical storm that night. It made a second landfall, in mainland China, about 24 hours after landfall on Taiwan and was downgraded to a tropical storm the next morning. It further weakened inland and the JMA issued its final advisory on the morning of August 20.

On August 15, monsoon rains brought by Typhoon Sepat flooded and paralyzed traffic in Metro Manila. Classes and services in government offices were suspended until August 17.

=== Typhoon Fitow ===
- Typhoon (JMA)
- Category 1 typhoon (SSHWS)
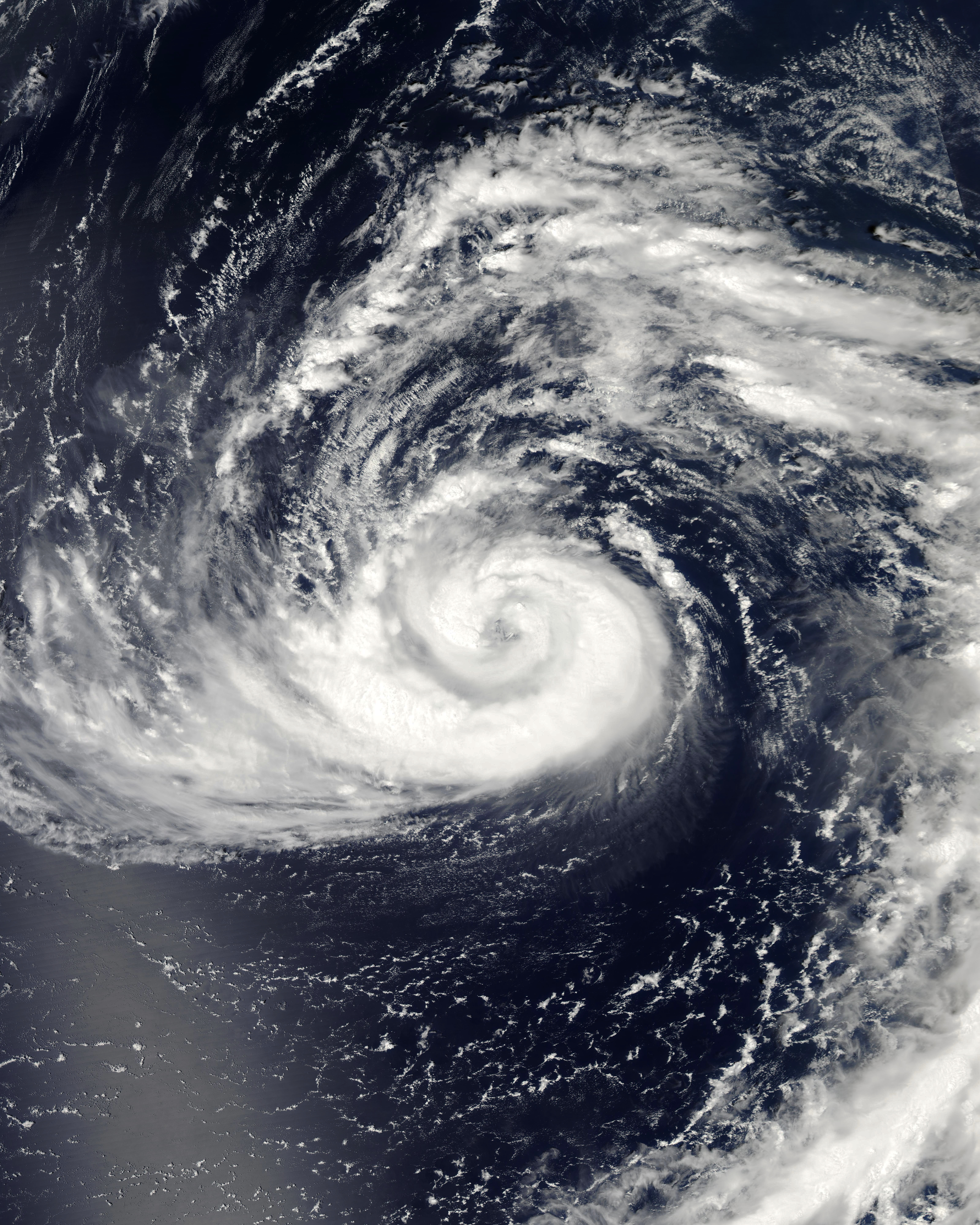
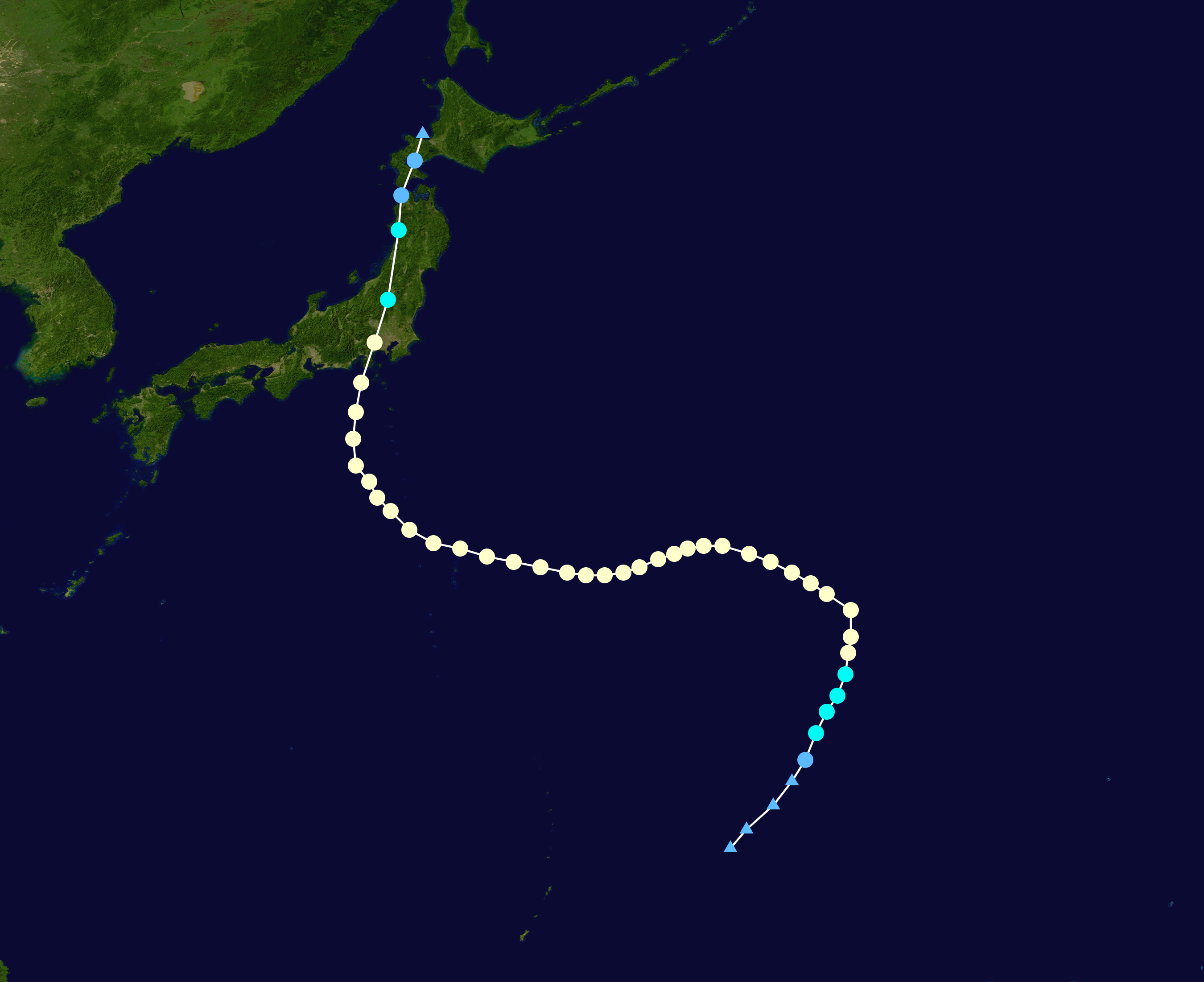
- Duration: August 29 – September 8
- Peak intensity: 130 km/h (80 mph) (10-min); 965 hPa (mbar)

On August 28, an area of disturbed weather that had lingered east-northeast of Saipan became better organised. The Joint Typhoon Warning Center initiated warnings on Tropical Depression 10W the next morning, and the JMA initiated advisories on a tropical depression the same day. Under favourable conditions, the system intensified quickly, becoming Tropical Storm Fitow by afternoon and a severe tropical storm by the evening of August 29. The name Fitow was contributed by the Federated States of Micronesia, and is Yapese for a beautiful fragrant flower. Rapid intensification ensued, and Fitow became a typhoon early on August 30. Fitow made landfall near Tokyo, Japan late on September 6 as a minimal typhoon. The JMA downgraded Fitow to a severe tropical storm early on September 7, and a tropical storm later that day. The cyclone degenerated into a remnant low on September 8.

In Japan, seven people were killed, and at least 50 were injured, as Fitow brought strong winds and heavy rain. Over 80,000 houses experienced a power outage. Transport in and around Tokyo was also affected, with nearly 200 flights cancelled and many commuter trains suspended. In the Tama area west of central Tokyo, flood warnings were issued for the Tama River, and many homeless people who lived along its banks were swept away.

=== Severe Tropical Storm Danas ===
- Severe tropical storm (JMA)
- Category 1 typhoon (SSHWS)
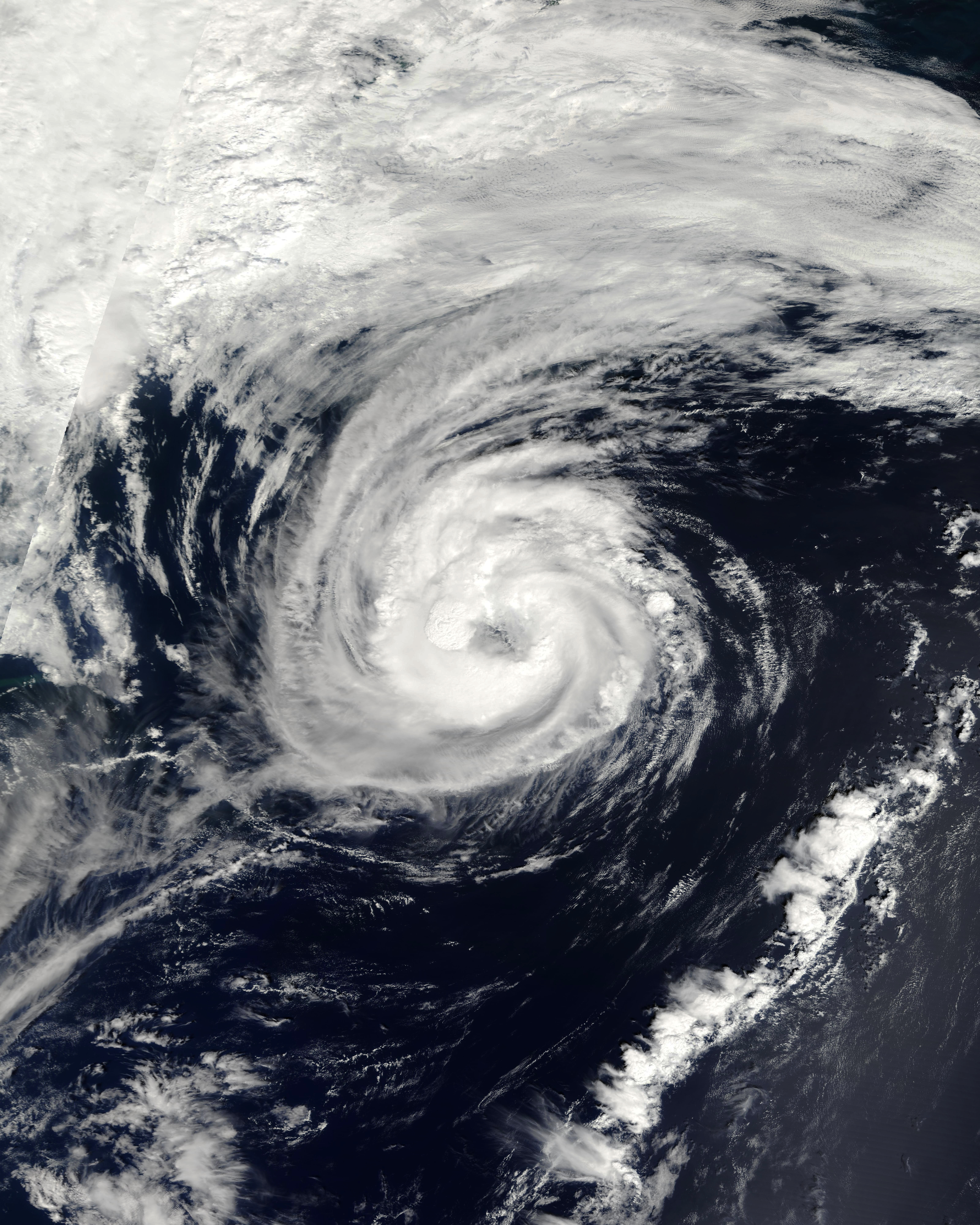
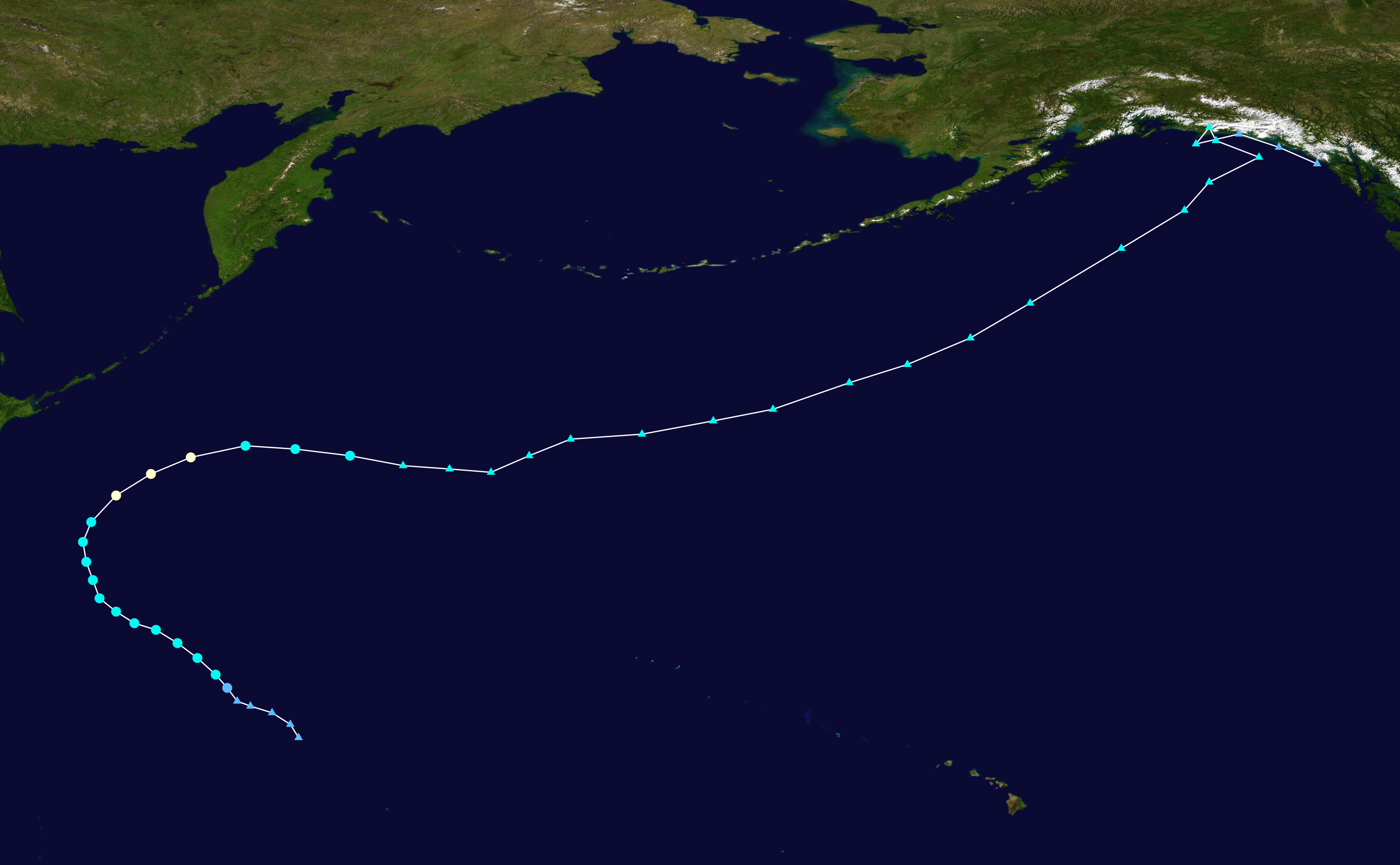
- Duration: September 7 – September 11
- Peak intensity: 100 km/h (65 mph) (10-min); 990 hPa (mbar)

A disturbed area of weather northwest of Wake Island formed early on September 3 and tracked north then northwest, becoming more organised, and on September 6 was recognised as a full tropical depression by the JMA. A TCFA was issued on the same day. The storm continued northwest-ward toward Japan, becoming Tropical Storm Danas early on September 7. The storm slowed its westward movement and headed north, and then northeast, becoming a severe tropical storm on September 9. By the 11th, cooler waters had weakened the storm down to a tropical storm and the storm degenerated into a remnant low later that day. The name Danas was submitted by the Philippines and is defined in the Filipino language as "to go through an experience" High waves from Danas injured two people in Japan.

=== Typhoon Nari (Falcon) ===
- Very strong typhoon (JMA)
- Category 4 typhoon (SSHWS)
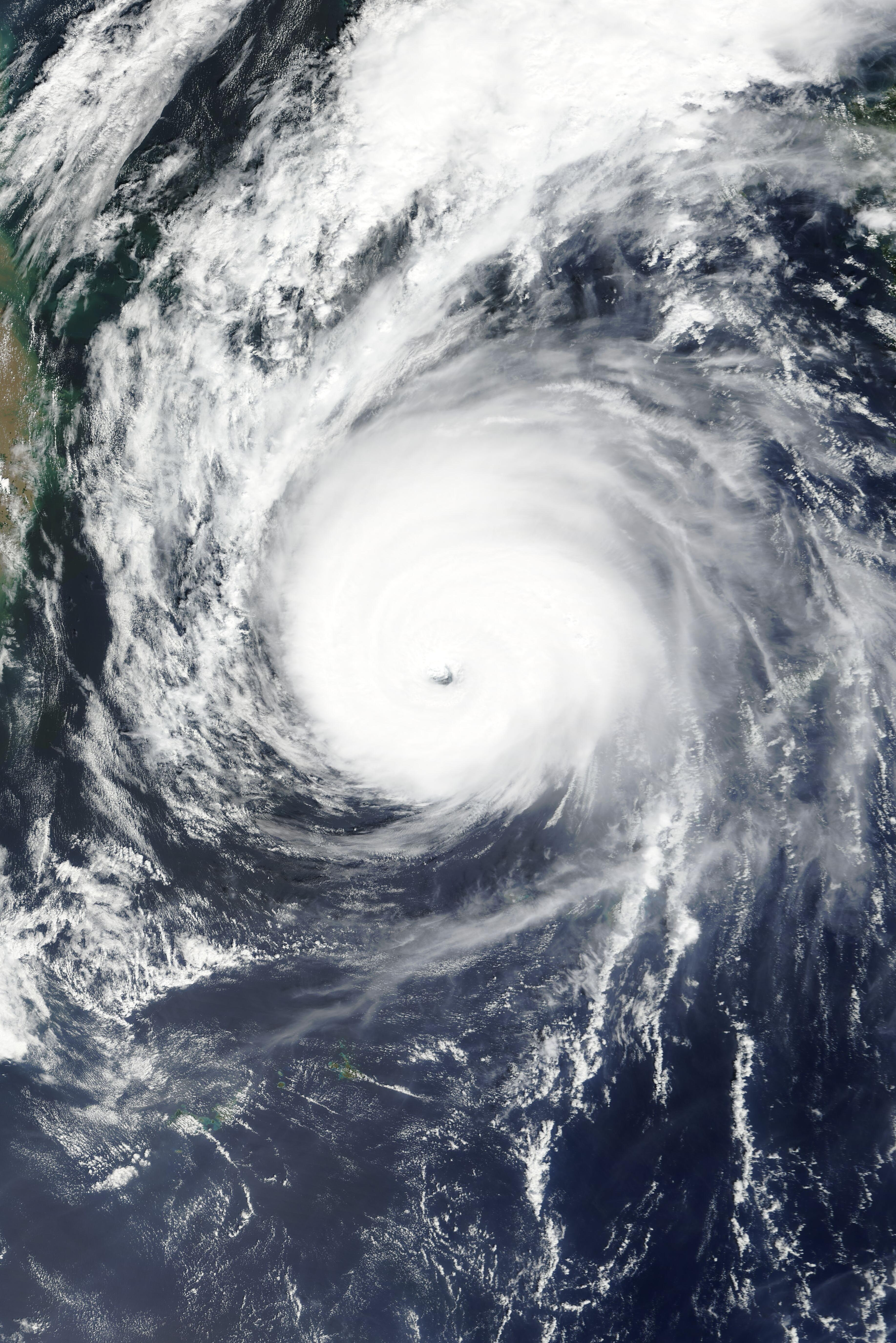
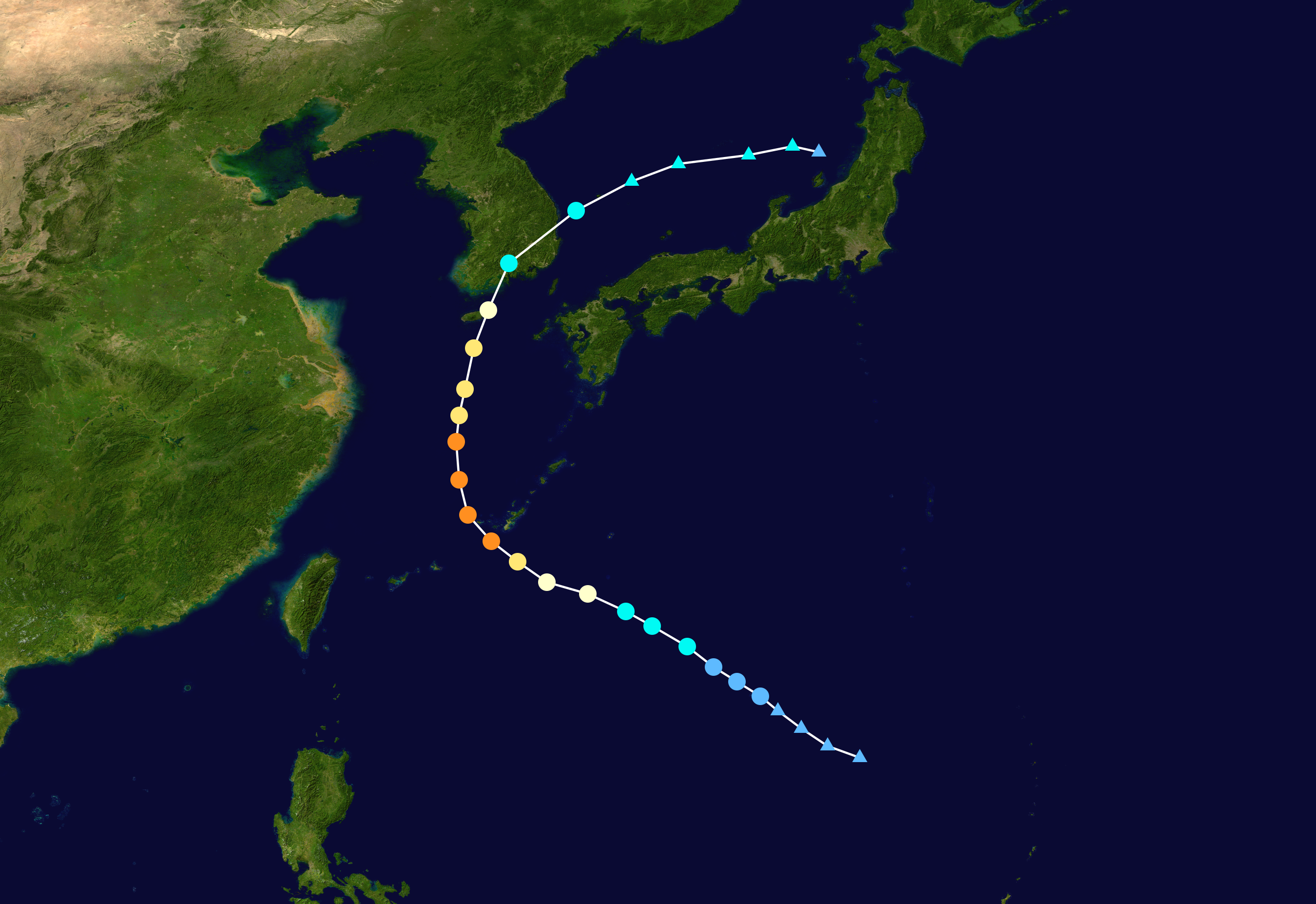
- Duration: September 11 – September 17
- Peak intensity: 185 km/h (115 mph) (10-min); 935 hPa (mbar)

An area of disturbed weather developed northwest of Guam on September 10 and moved northwestward, slowly increasing in organisation. The Japan Meteorological Agency began monitoring the system as a tropical depression the next day. The depression continued to organise and strengthen, and the Joint Typhoon Warning Center issued a Tropical Cyclone Formation Alert on it during the afternoon of September 12, and began issuing advisories on Tropical Depression 12W an hour later. The JMA followed suit early on September 13 and initiated advisories on the system; PAGASA named the system Falcon shortly after. The depression continued to intensify, and the JMA upgraded it to Tropical Storm Nari later that morning. The storm then underwent rapid intensification that afternoon and evening, strengthening from a tropical depression to a typhoon in just 18 hours. The JMA upgraded Nari to a severe tropical storm late that afternoon, and by late that evening, Nari was upgraded to a typhoon. Nari reached its peak on September 14, and began weakening soon afterwards. It turned extratropical right after landfall in South Korea at tropical storm strength. At least 20 people have been killed or are missing due to the flooding caused by Nari. Rainfall totals reached a record 590 mm (23 in) in Jeju, South Korea. The name Nari was submitted by South Korea, and means lily.

=== Typhoon Wipha (Goring) ===
- Very strong typhoon (JMA)
- Category 4 super typhoon (SSHWS)
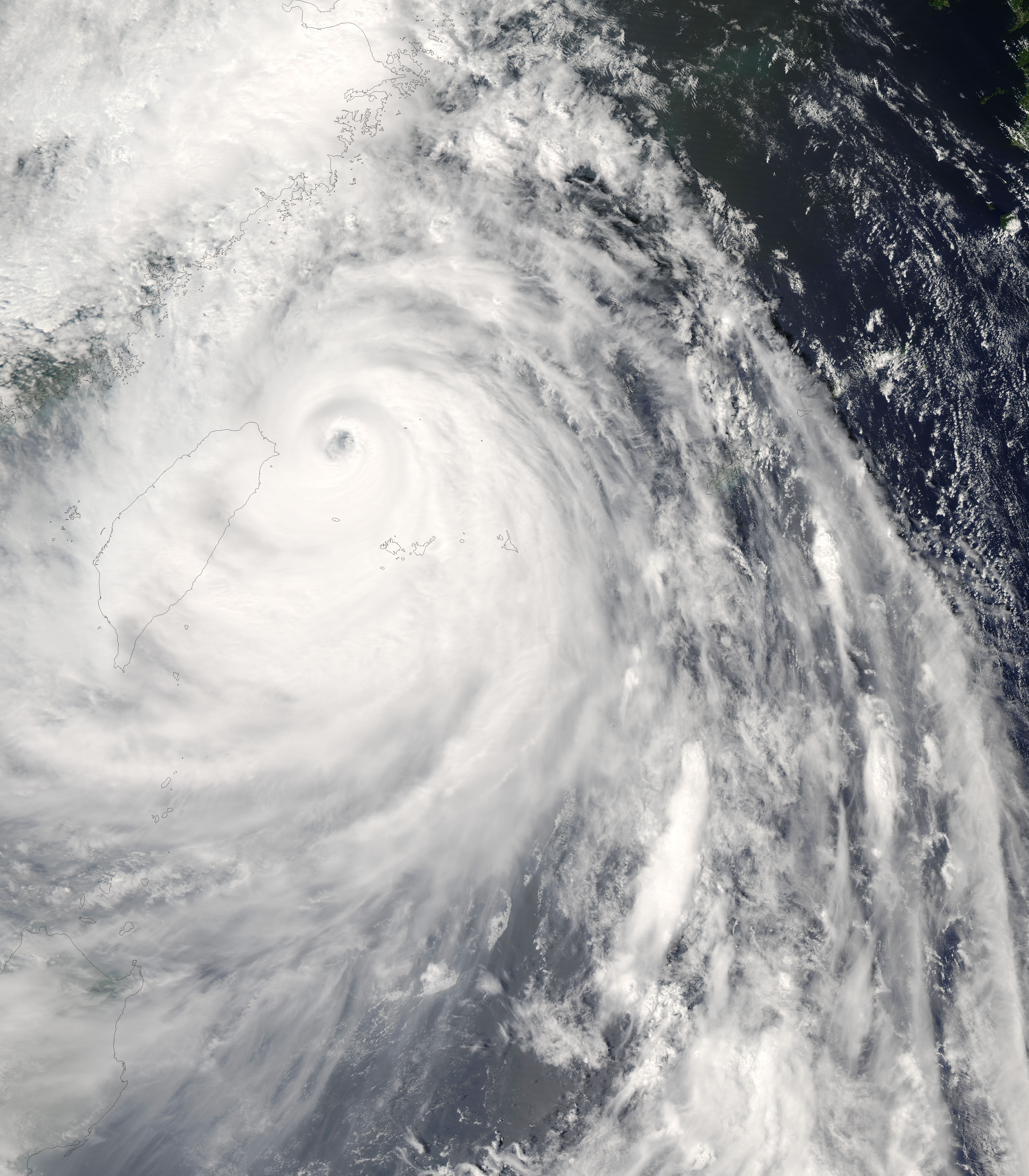
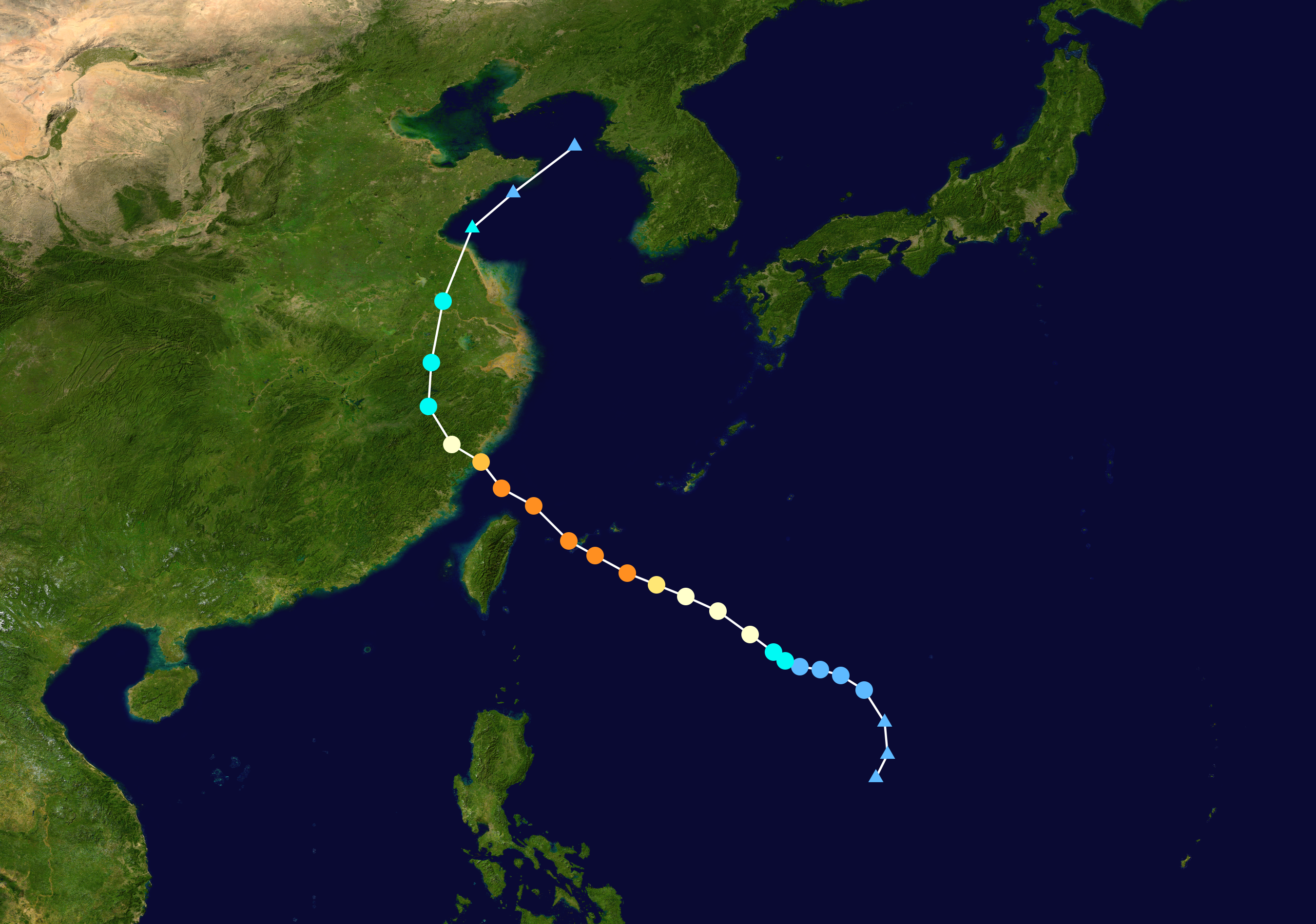
- Duration: September 15 – September 20
- Peak intensity: 185 km/h (115 mph) (10-min); 925 hPa (mbar)

An area of disturbed weather formed southeast of Naha, Okinawa early on September 13. This area gradually became better organised, and a TCFA was issued late on September 14. The JMA upgraded the storm to a tropical depression on September 15, and the JTWC soon followed suit with Tropical Depression 13W. PAGASA named the storm "Goring" later that day. On September 16, the storm had gained enough organisation to be designated as a tropical storm. On September 17, the storm underwent rapid intensification and quickly strengthened into a typhoon. It continued to strengthen rapidly and was upgraded by the JTWC to a super typhoon early on September 18. In the early hours, local time, of September 19, Wipha slammed into Fuding, near the Fujian–Zhejiang provincial border in China. However, before the storm made landfall it weakened slightly, becoming a Category 3-equivalent typhoon. Wipha originally threatened to pass over Shanghai, which would have made it the most destructive Chinese typhoon in over a decade. However, it veered to the south, making a direct impact unlikely. Throughout the Shanghai and Fujian-Zhejiang area, nearly 2 million people evacuated, including 1.5 million in Zhejiang and 291 thousand from low-lying areas, due to the threat from Wipha. The Xinhua News Agency considered the evacuations to be the region's most extensive in over a half century.

Boats, ferries, and ships were called back into port to take refuge in harbors. At both airports in Shanghai, at least twenty flights were canceled and fifty postponed. The typhoon also caused FIFA to reschedule four matches in the Women's World Cup. Flooding was severe. In the area, at least 80 streets were flooded and brought water levels in several rivers and reservoirs to dangerous levels. In total, nine people were killed and damage was estimated at over $880 million (US$).

=== Tropical Depression 14W ===
- Tropical depression (JMA)
- Tropical depression (SSHWS)
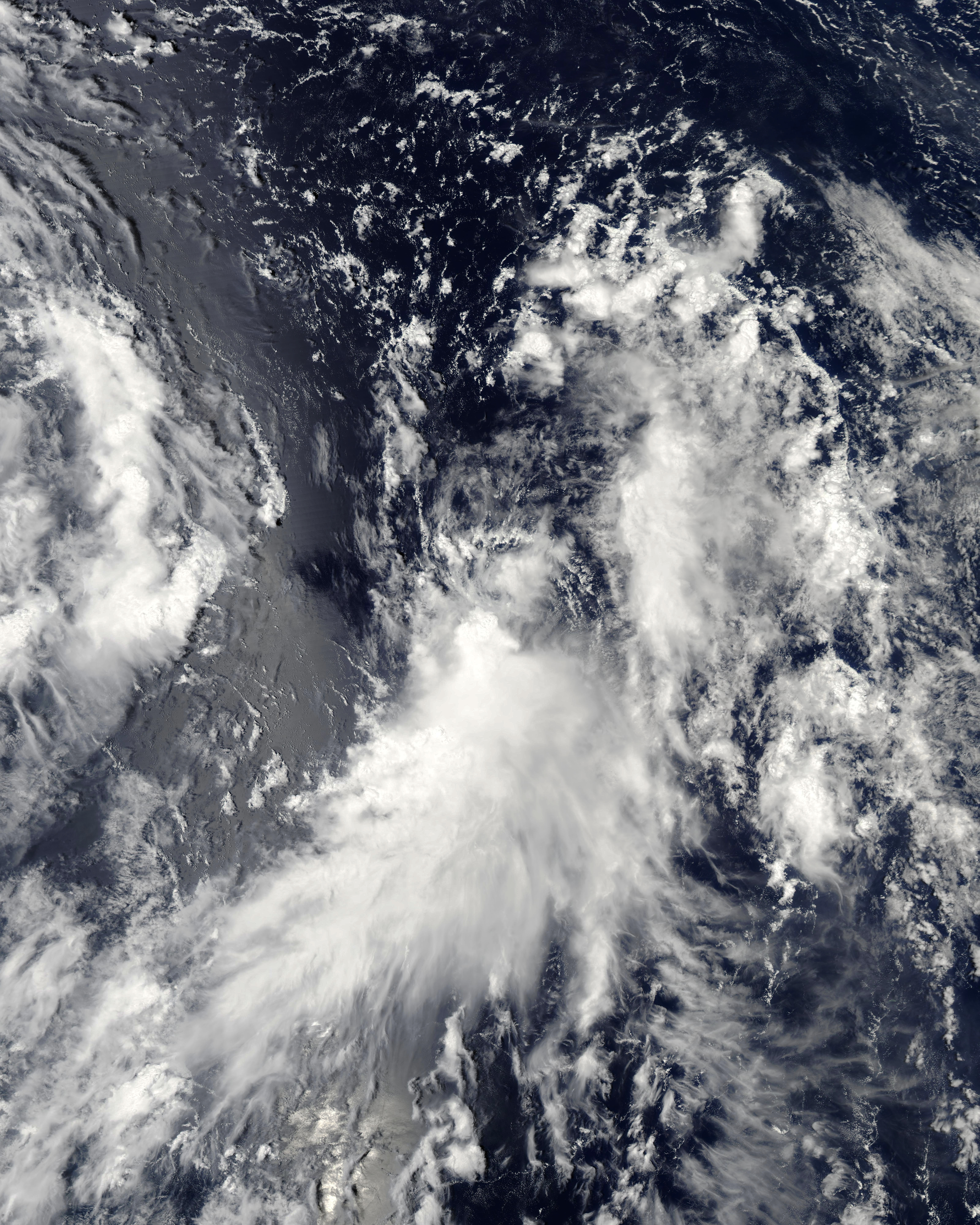
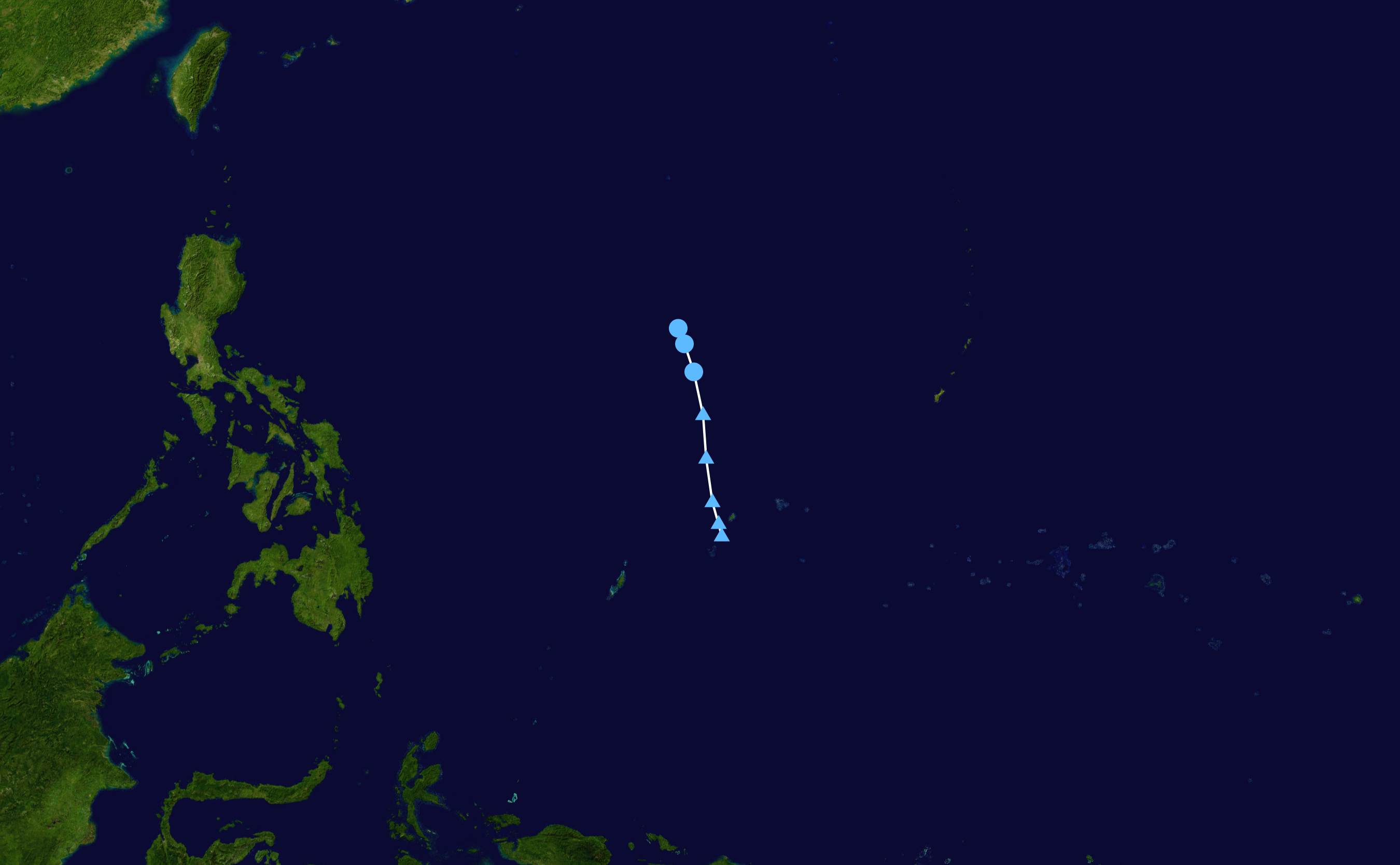
- Duration: September 20 – September 21
- Peak intensity: 55 km/h (35 mph) (10-min); 1000 hPa (mbar)

An area of disturbed weather formed about 460 nmi (850 km) west of Guam early on September 19. It was recognised as a minor tropical depression by the JMA later that day. On September 20, the JTWC initiated advisories on Tropical Depression 14W. Initially forecast to become a tropical storm, it was impacted by strong vertical wind shear and degenerated into a remnant low on September 21.

=== Tropical Storm Francisco ===
- Tropical storm (JMA)
- Tropical storm (SSHWS)
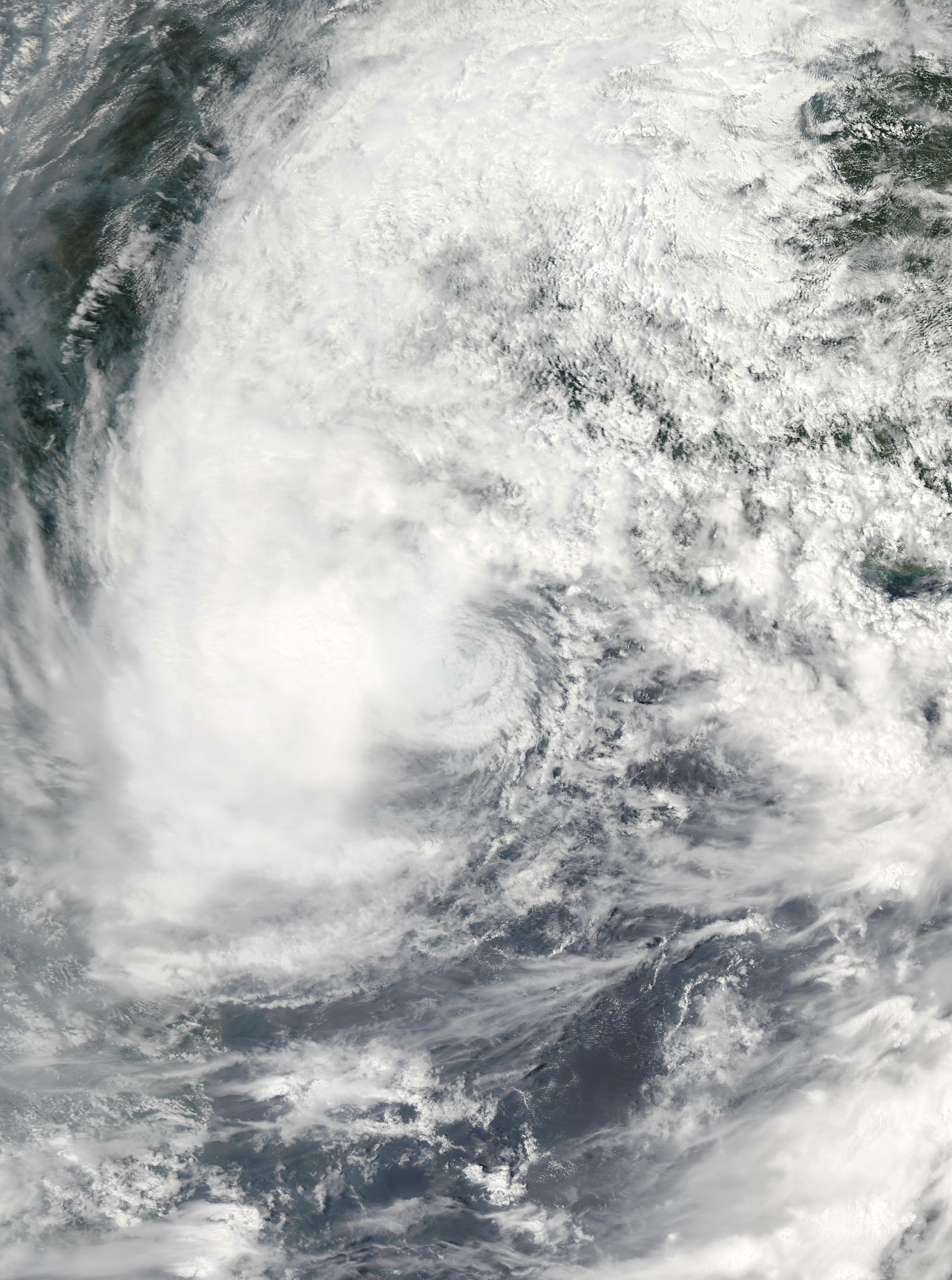
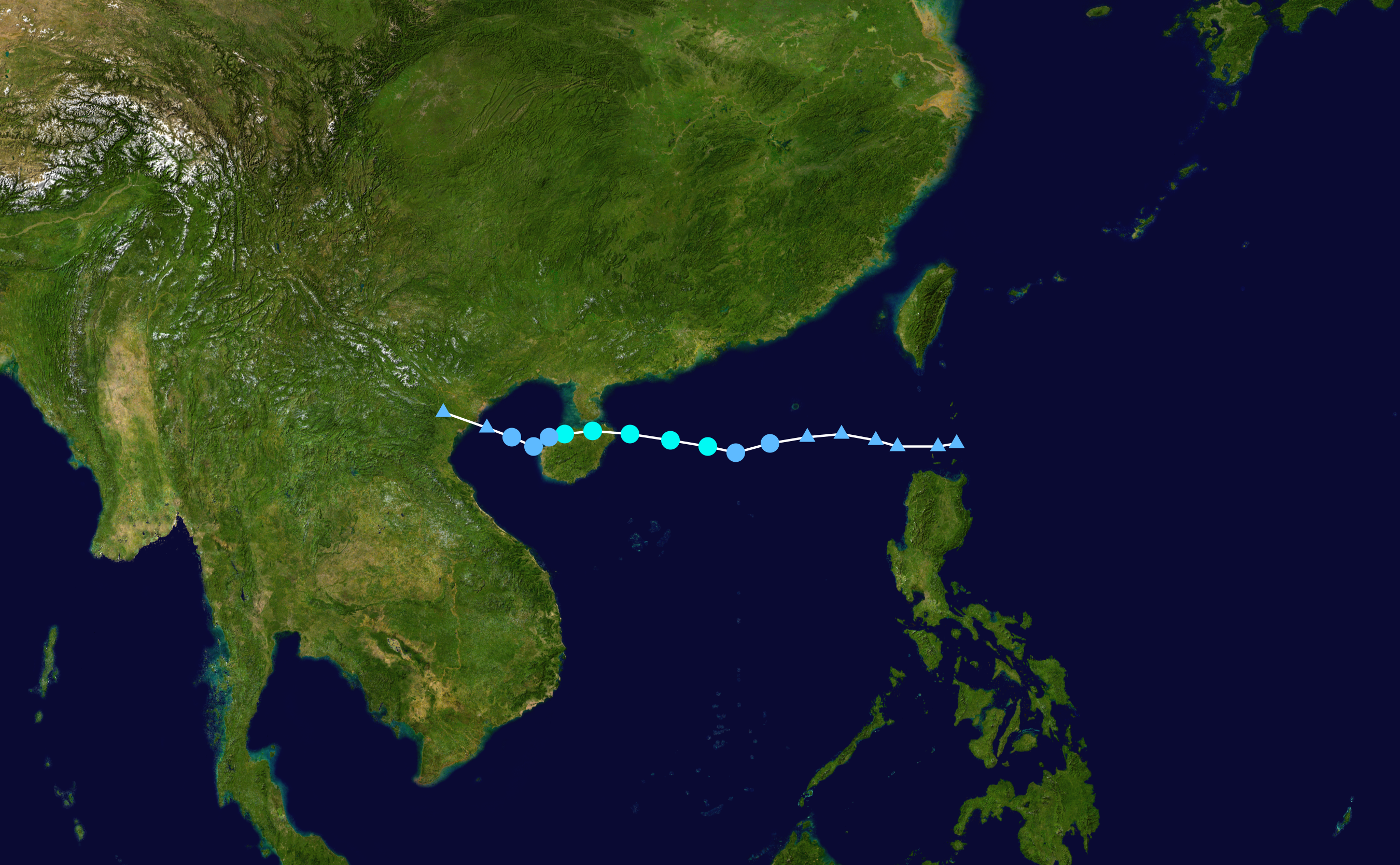
- Duration: September 21 – September 25
- Peak intensity: 75 km/h (45 mph) (10-min); 990 hPa (mbar)

An area of disturbed weather formed about 190 nmi (350 km) south-southeast of Hong Kong early on September 19. It was recognised as a minor tropical depression by the JMA on the 21st, and upgraded to a full depression on the 23rd. The JTWC recognised Tropical Depression 15W at the same time. Nine hours after being declared a full depression, the JMA and the JTWC upgraded it to Tropical Storm Francisco. The storm traveled due west and over Wenchang on Hainan Island on September 24. Land interaction and moderate wind shear caused Francisco to weaken to a tropical depression as warnings were discontinued. The name 'Francisco' was submitted by the United States and is a common Chamorro man's name. A ship, carrying eight people sank over the South China Sea during the storm. Two of the people on the ship were rescued but the other six were listed as missing.

=== Severe Tropical Storm Lekima (Hanna) ===
- Severe tropical storm (JMA)
- Category 1 typhoon (SSHWS)
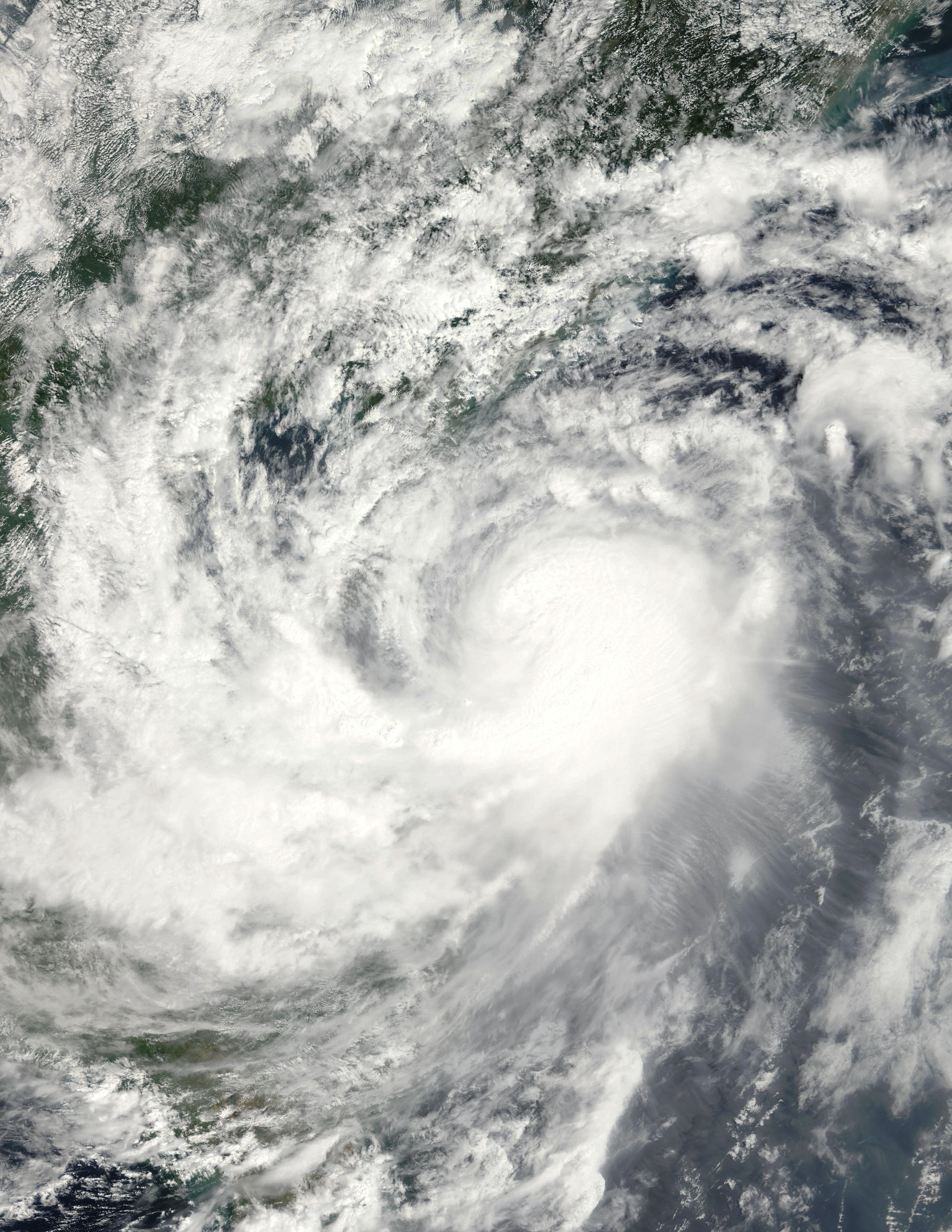
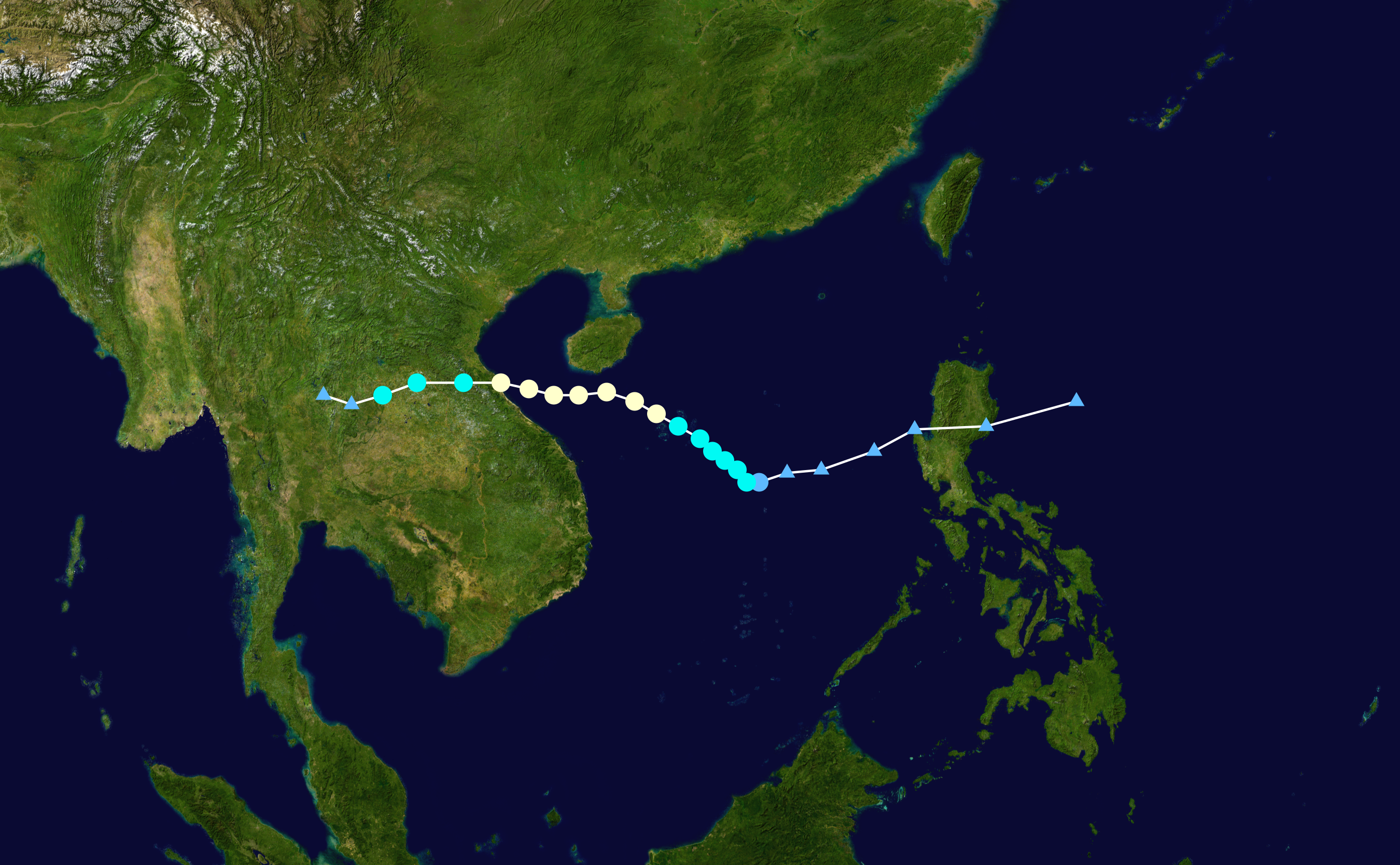
- Duration: September 28 – October 4
- Peak intensity: 110 km/h (70 mph) (10-min); 975 hPa (mbar)

A tropical disturbance wave near the Philippines gradually developed. PAGASA was first to upgrade it, declaring it Tropical Depression Hanna on September 27, and upgrading it to a tropical storm the next day. It made landfall in central Luzon early on September 29, and shortly thereafter the JMA declared the system Tropical Storm Lekima. It continued to strengthen and was upgraded to a severe tropical storm on September 30 (the JTWC upgraded it to a typhoon) and remained at such until landfall. It dissipated over land on October 5

Lekima brought heavy rains to Luzon causing a landslide that killed eight people, including three children, in Ifugao Province, while another person was found dead in Quezon City. Torrential rains also caused landslides, flooding, infrastructure damage, and disruption of transportation service in other parts of the country. Over 100,000 people were evacuated in southern China as the storm approached, and more than 20,000 fishing boats were recalled back to the harbors. On October 3, Lekima made landfall in Vietnam. Due to the impact of Typhoon Lekima, a weather station in Kỳ Anh (Hà Tĩnh) recorded sustained winds of 130 km/h (81 mph), while another station on Hòn Ngư Island (Nghệ An) recorded sustained winds of 94 km/h (58 mph). Rainfall from 19:00 on October 1 to 01:00 on October 4 (UTC+7) in provinces (or municipalities) from Hà Tĩnh to Quảng Nam generally ranged from 200 mm (7.9 in) upwards, with some locations recording over 500 mm (19.7 in) of rainfall. The lowest barometric pressure measured in Ba Đồn (Quảng Bình) during the storm was 975.5 hPa (28.81 inHg). About 100,000 houses were destroyed. The storm has killed 88 people and left 8 others missing in Vietnam.

=== Tropical Storm Haiyan ===
- Tropical storm (JMA)
- Tropical storm (SSHWS)
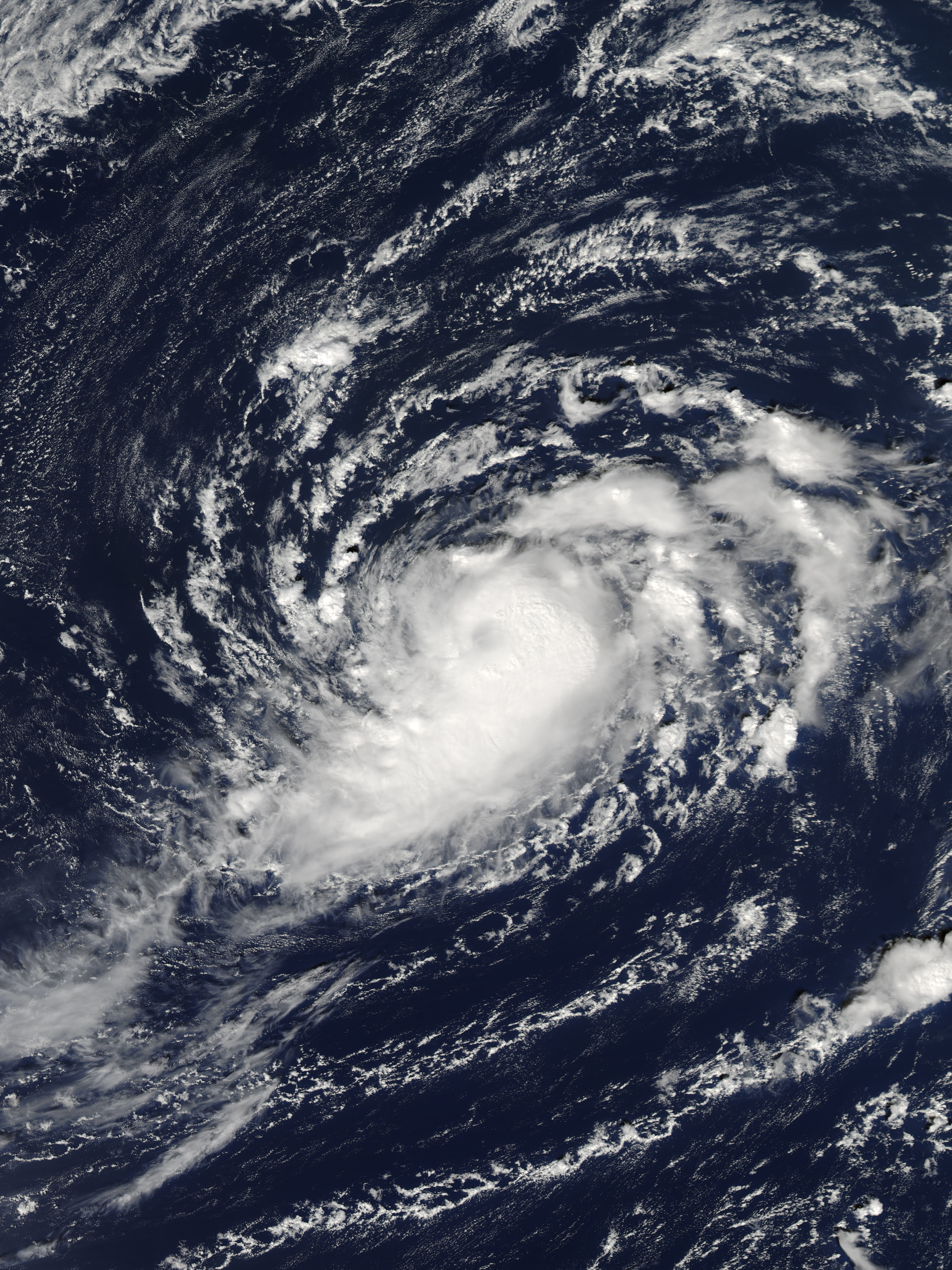
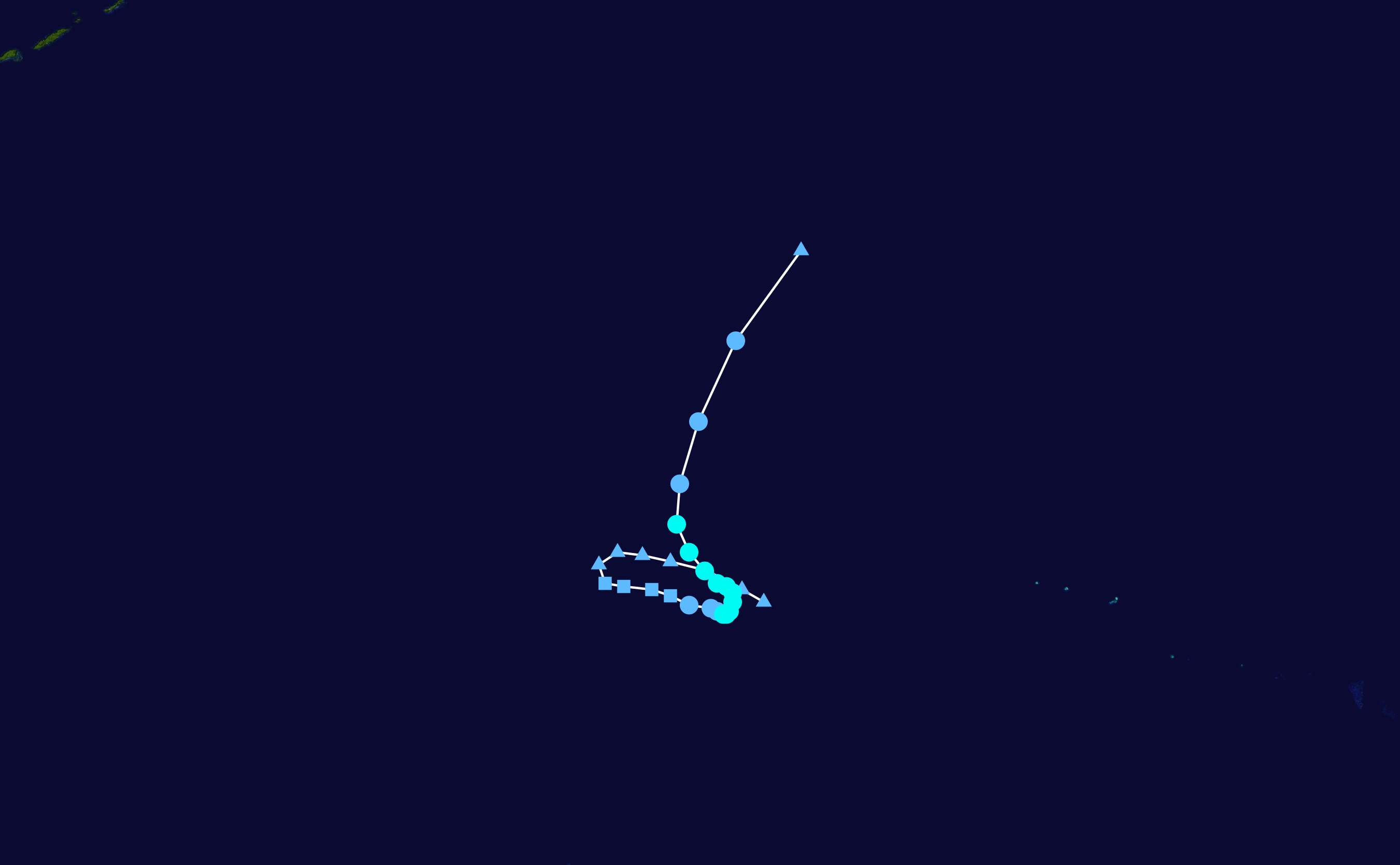
- Duration: September 30 – October 7
- Peak intensity: 75 km/h (45 mph) (10-min); 994 hPa (mbar)

A tropical low formed northeast of Wake Island on September 29, and it developed into a tropical depression late on September 30, which was operationally analyzed as an extratropical cyclone by the JMA on the next day. On October 2, the JMA classified the system as a subtropical depression, and on the next day, it upgraded into a tropical depression at noon on October 3, when deep convection over the system dissipated again. The JTWC analyzed that the depression had intensified into a tropical storm, early on October 4. Although operationally identified as an extratropical cyclone, the JMA analyzed that Haiyan had intensified into a tropical storm at 00:00, and had organized well enough that it had formed an eye-like feature, as well as deep convection and curved banding. UTC on October 5. Early on October 6, the JMA operationally upgraded the system to a tropical storm, but their post-storm analysis indicated that Haiyan had started to weaken and soon become a tropical depression at 06:00 UTC. The agency downgraded Haiyan to a tropical depression operationally late on the same day, as well as the JTWC downgraded it to a tropical depression at the same time in best track data. On October 7, Haiyan became totally exposed with a clear low-level circulation center, along with Severe Tropical Storm Podul, began to interact with it early on the same day, prompting Haiyan to accelerate northwards. Soon, the JMA declared that Haiyan had dissipated, and the remnants were later absorbed by the new extratropical cyclone transitioned from Podul. However, the JTWC determined that Haiyan completely dissipated late on October 7. Originally not recognized by JTWC, Haiyan was added to the best track database and designated as 27W in their post-season analysis.

=== Typhoon Krosa (Ineng) ===
- Violent typhoon (JMA)
- Category 4 super typhoon (SSHWS)
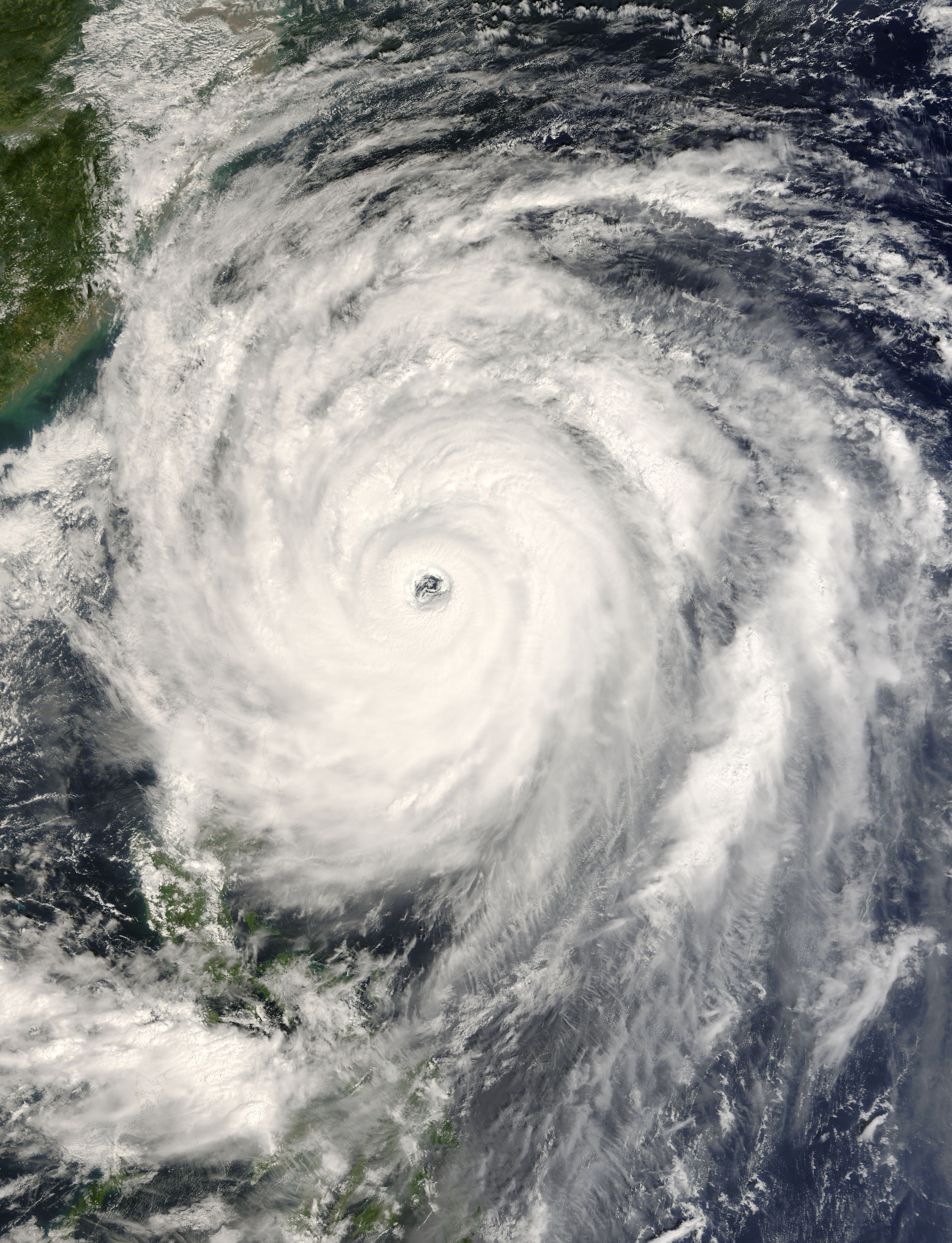
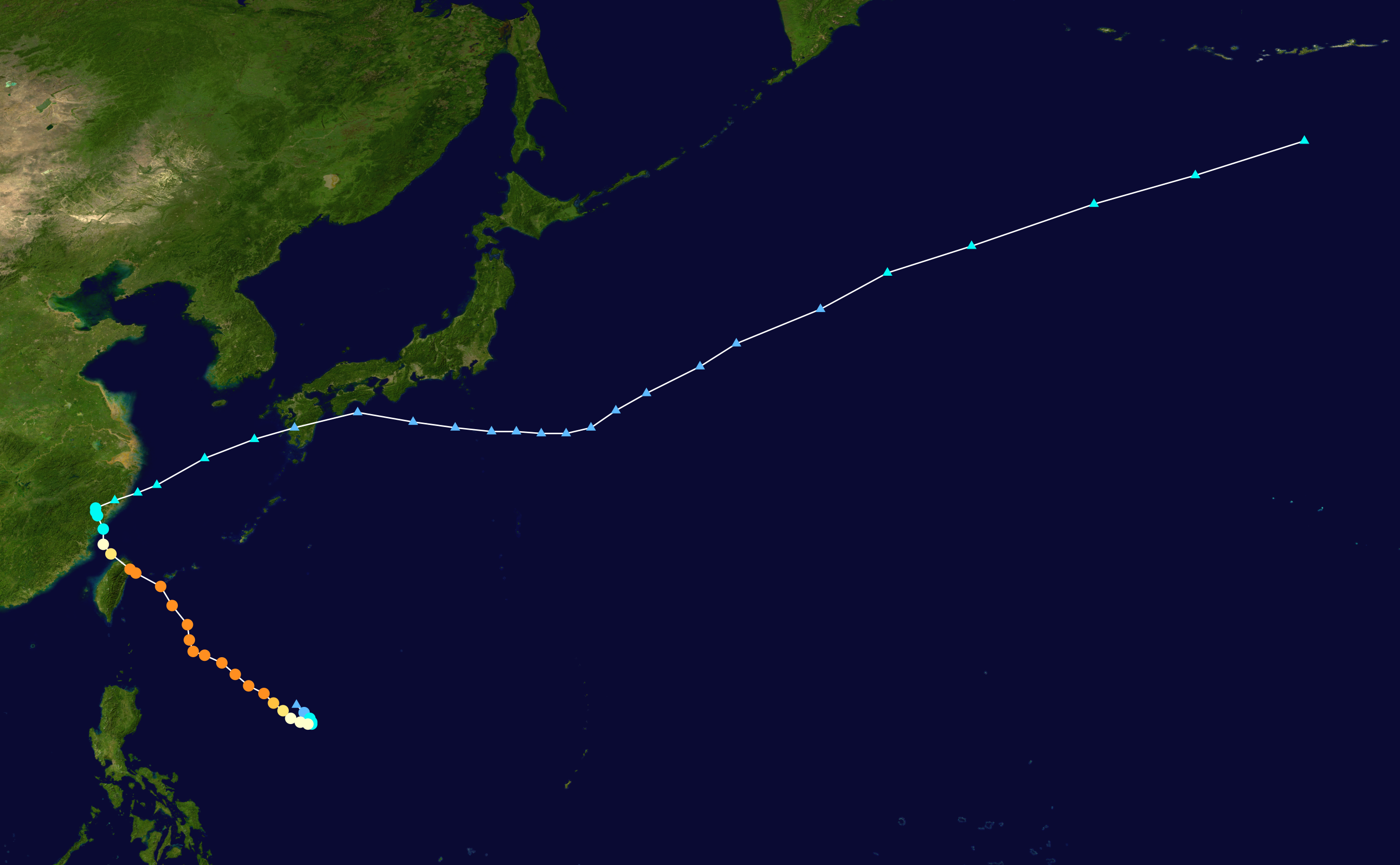
- Duration: October 1 – October 8
- Peak intensity: 195 km/h (120 mph) (10-min); 925 hPa (mbar)

In late September, a new system formed east of the Philippines. PAGASA declared it a tropical depression (Ineng) early on October 1, and the JMA and JTWC soon followed. It was upgraded to a tropical storm early on October 2, named Krosa. Rapid intensification took place on October 2 and it was upgraded to a typhoon by the JTWC by midday. As it intensified, it gained a wide, ragged eye and began to track to the west, becoming a typhoon by the JMA early on October 3. It continued to rapidly intensify that day before leveling off as a Category 4-equivalent typhoon on October 4. Fluctuations in intensity soon followed as Krosa approached Taiwan, as the JMA upgraded it to 105 knots (194 km/h) and the JTWC to a super typhoon early on October 5. It slowly weakened afterward before making landfall in northeastern Taiwan on October 6. At least 17 people were reported injured there, as the typhoon headed for China. An evacuation of 730,000 people from China's Zhejiang and Fujian provinces was ordered on the evening of October 6. The extratropical remnants of Krosa crossed the International Date Line on October 12.

=== Severe Tropical Storm Podul ===
- Severe tropical storm (JMA)
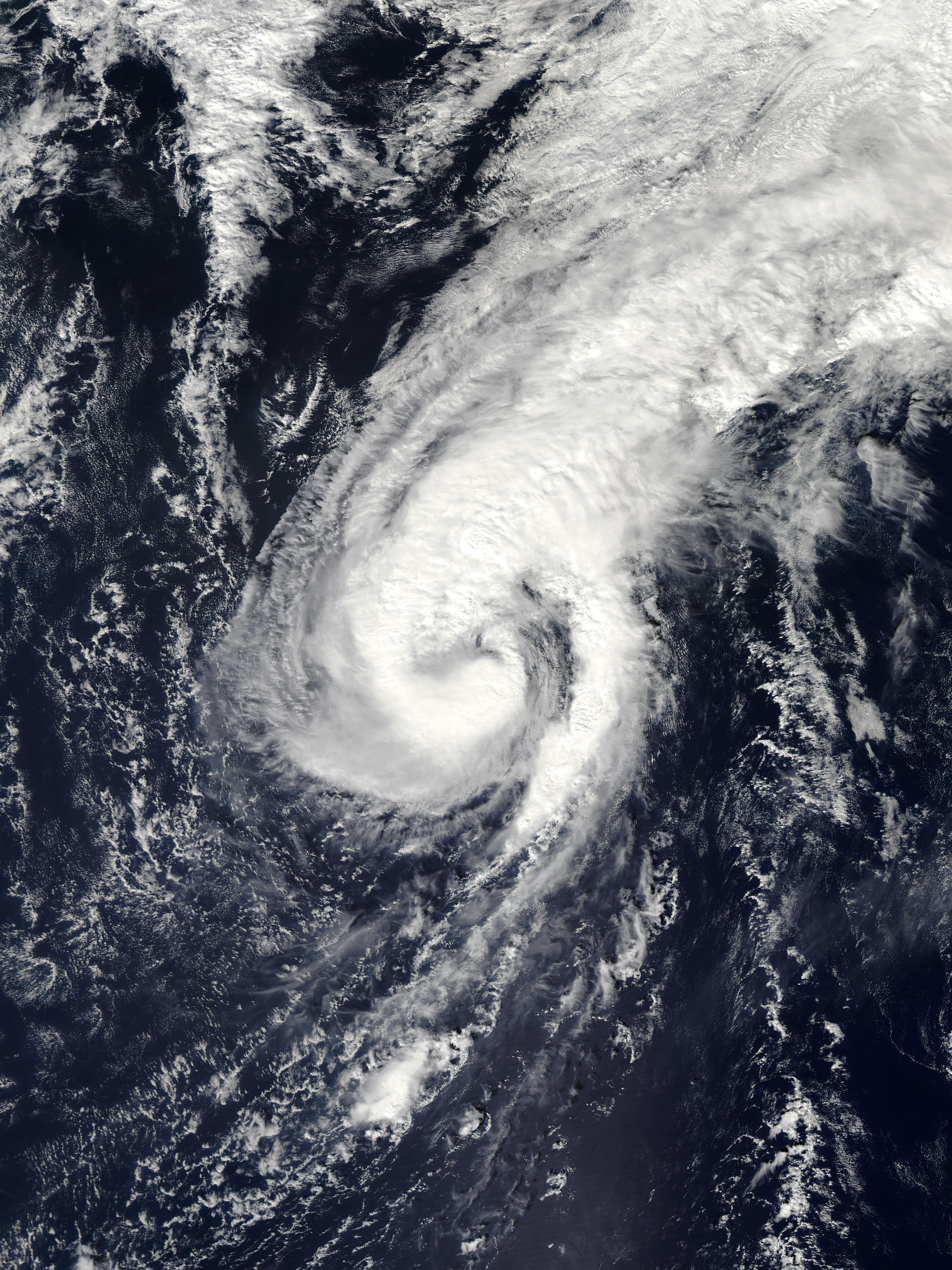
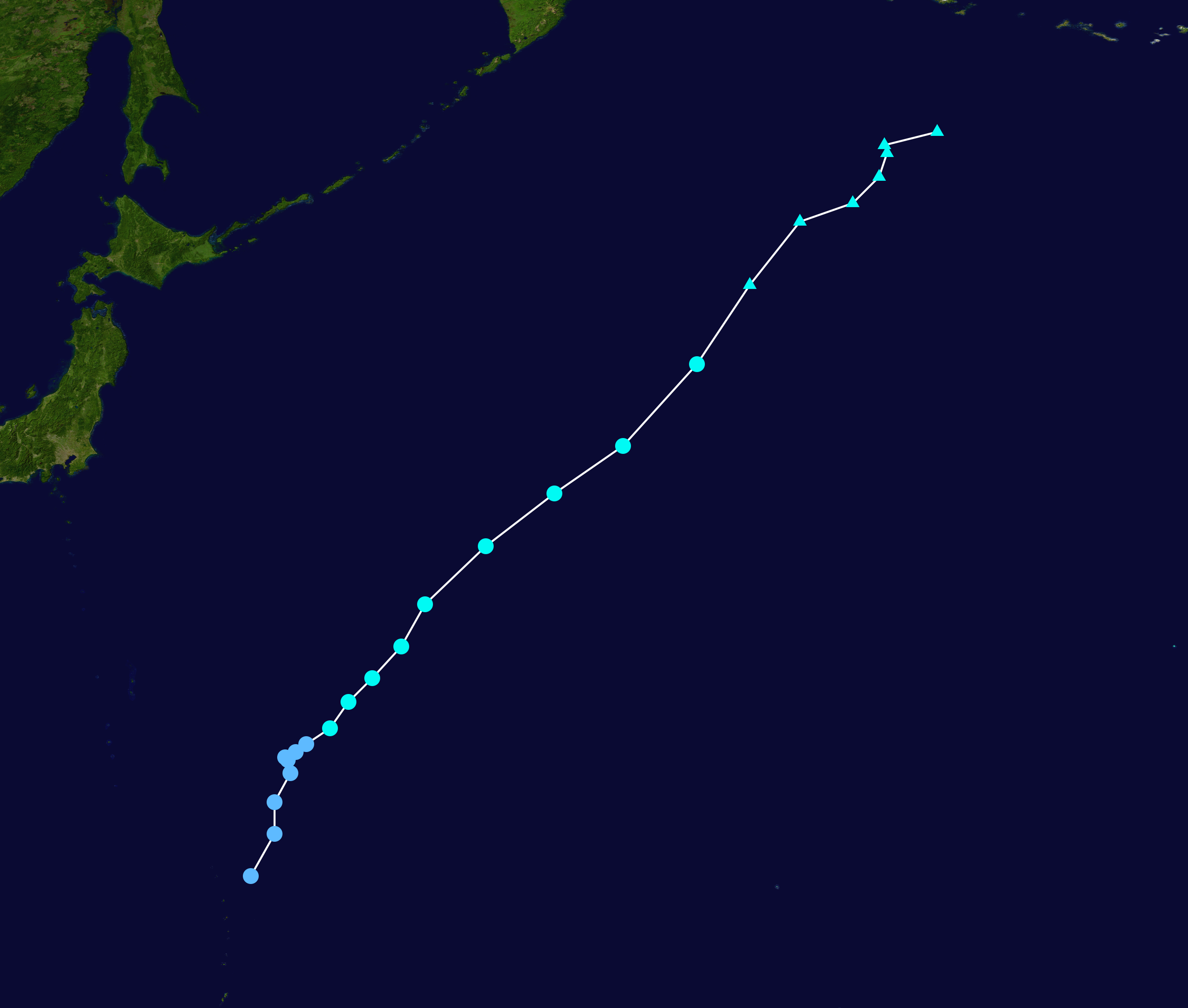
- Duration: October 3 – October 7
- Peak intensity: 100 km/h (65 mph) (10-min); 985 hPa (mbar)

On October 6, a tropical depression east of Japan was upgraded to Tropical Storm Podul while racing northeast. It was short-lived over the northwest Pacific and degenerated into a remnant low early on October 7. One person was killed due to the effects of Podul in Japan.

It was upgraded to severe tropical storm status by JMA in post analysis.

=== Tropical Storm Lingling ===
- Tropical storm (JMA)
- Tropical storm (SSHWS)
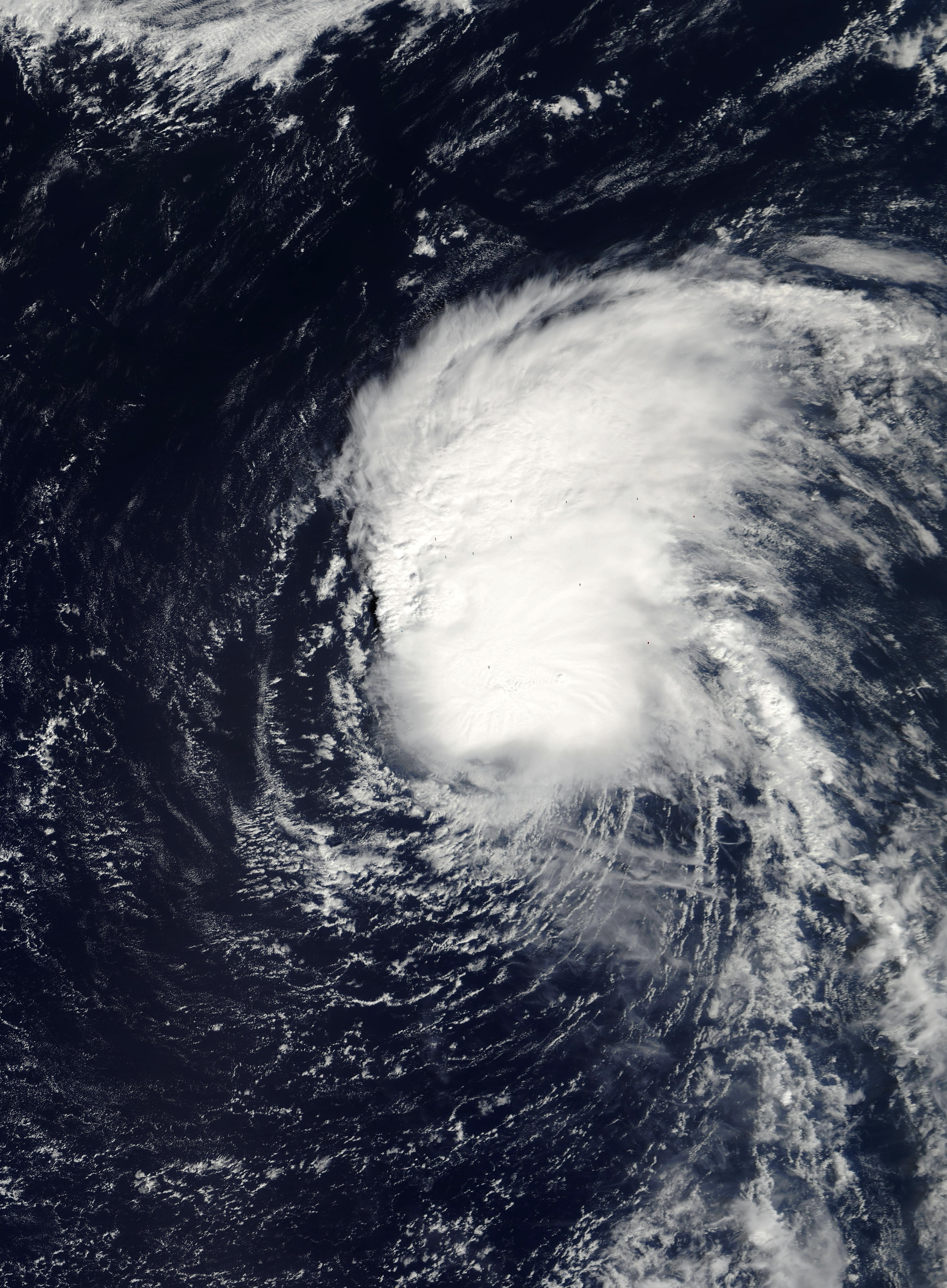
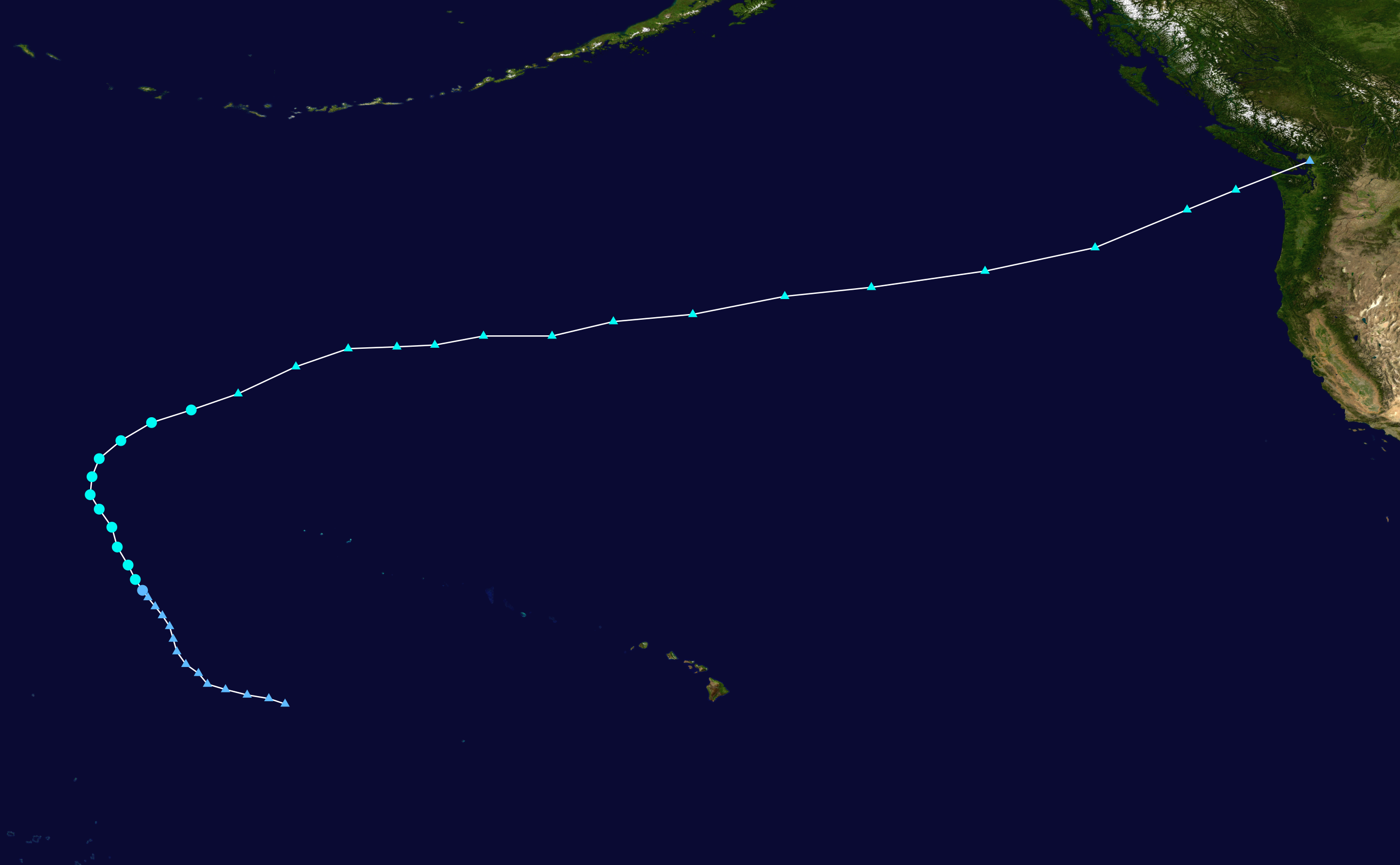
- Duration: October 11 – October 15
- Peak intensity: 85 km/h (50 mph) (10-min); 994 hPa (mbar)

On October 9, a disturbance from the North Central Pacific crossed the International Date Line, and became a tropical depression in the North Western Pacific, just east of the Date Line on October 11. It was upgraded to Tropical Storm Lingling by the JMA, and to Tropical Storm 18W by the JTWC, early on October 12. Lingling headed northeast, and gradually became weaker. On October 13, the JTWC issued its final advisory, and two days later the JMA did the same. An extratropical low incorporating the remnants of Lingling dissipated a few days later.

=== Typhoon Kajiki ===
- Very strong typhoon (JMA)
- Category 4 typhoon (SSHWS)
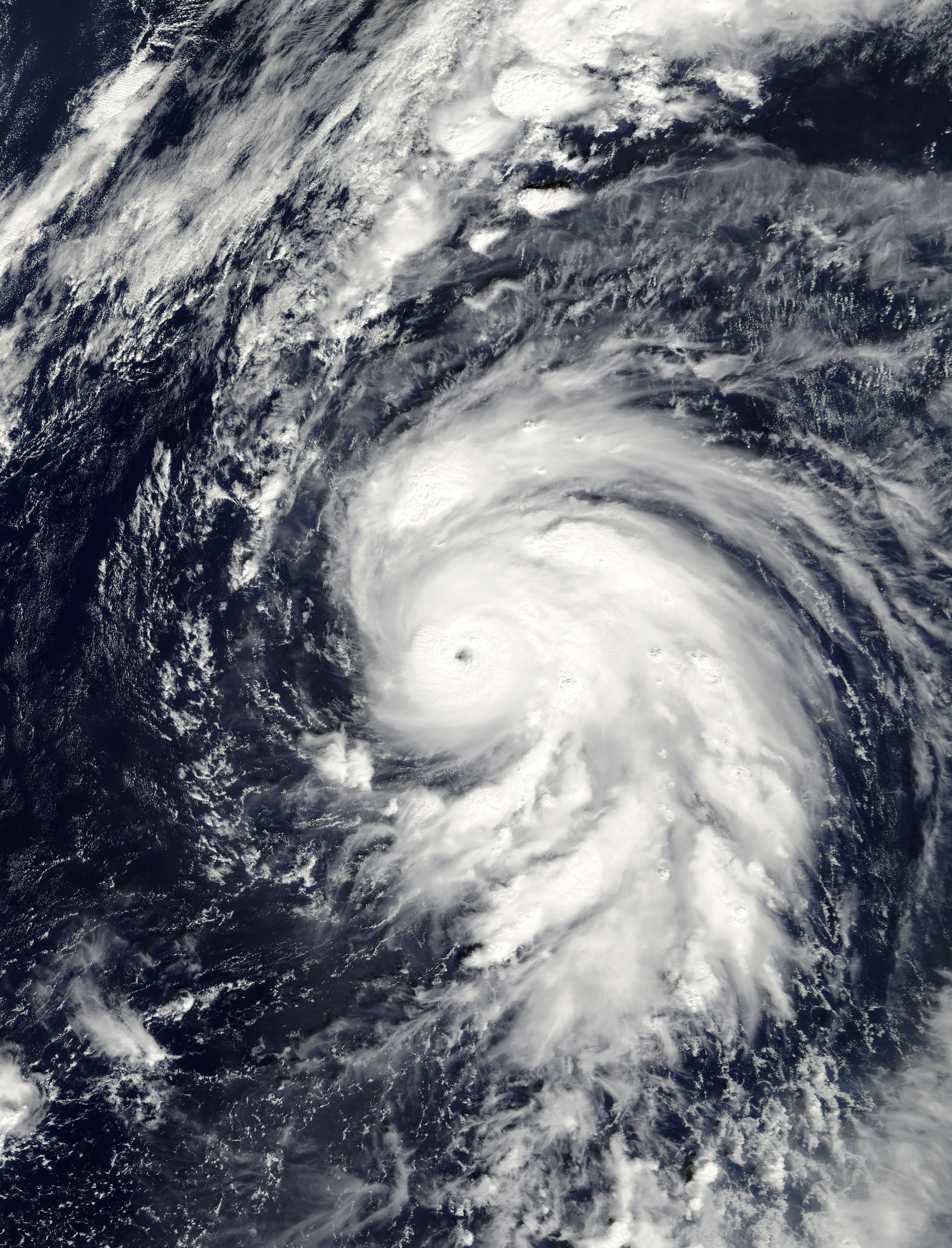
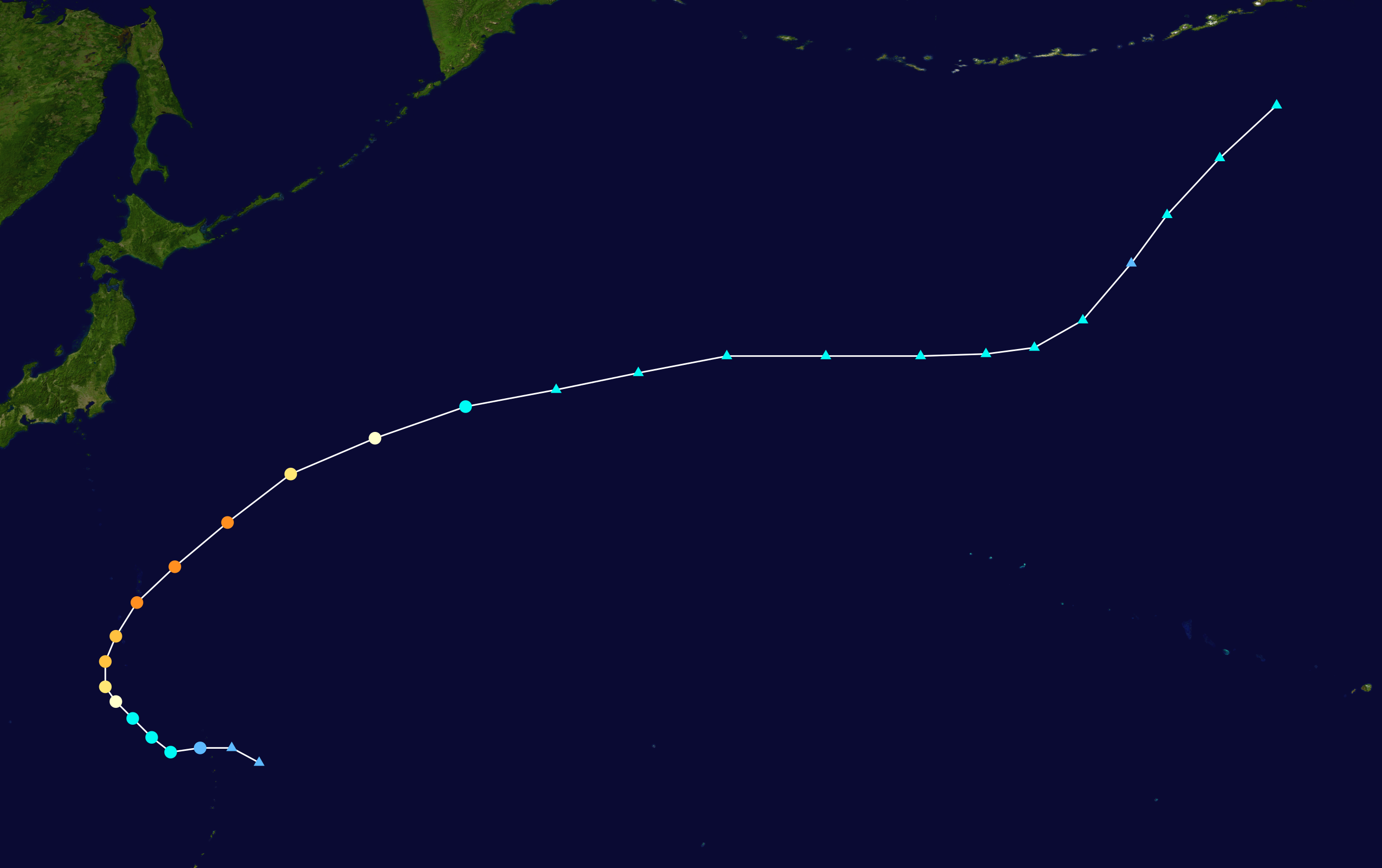
- Duration: October 19 – October 22
- Peak intensity: 165 km/h (105 mph) (10-min); 940 hPa (mbar)

An area of disturbed weather formed in the open ocean early on October 17, and tracked north-east. The JMA and the JTWC declared this area a tropical depression very early on October 19. Six hours later, it was upgraded to Tropical Storm Kajiki. Rapid intensification continued; another six hours later, it was upgraded to a severe tropical storm. Kajiki became a typhoon early on October 20 as it rapidly intensified. The storm reached peak intensity as it hit Iwo Jima and then gradually began weakening. The storm dropped upwards of 233 millimetres (9.2 in) of rain on the island. The airport on Iwo Jima reported winds gusts up to 140 km/h (85 mph).

=== Severe Tropical Storm Faxai (Juaning) ===
- Severe tropical storm (JMA)
- Tropical storm (SSHWS)
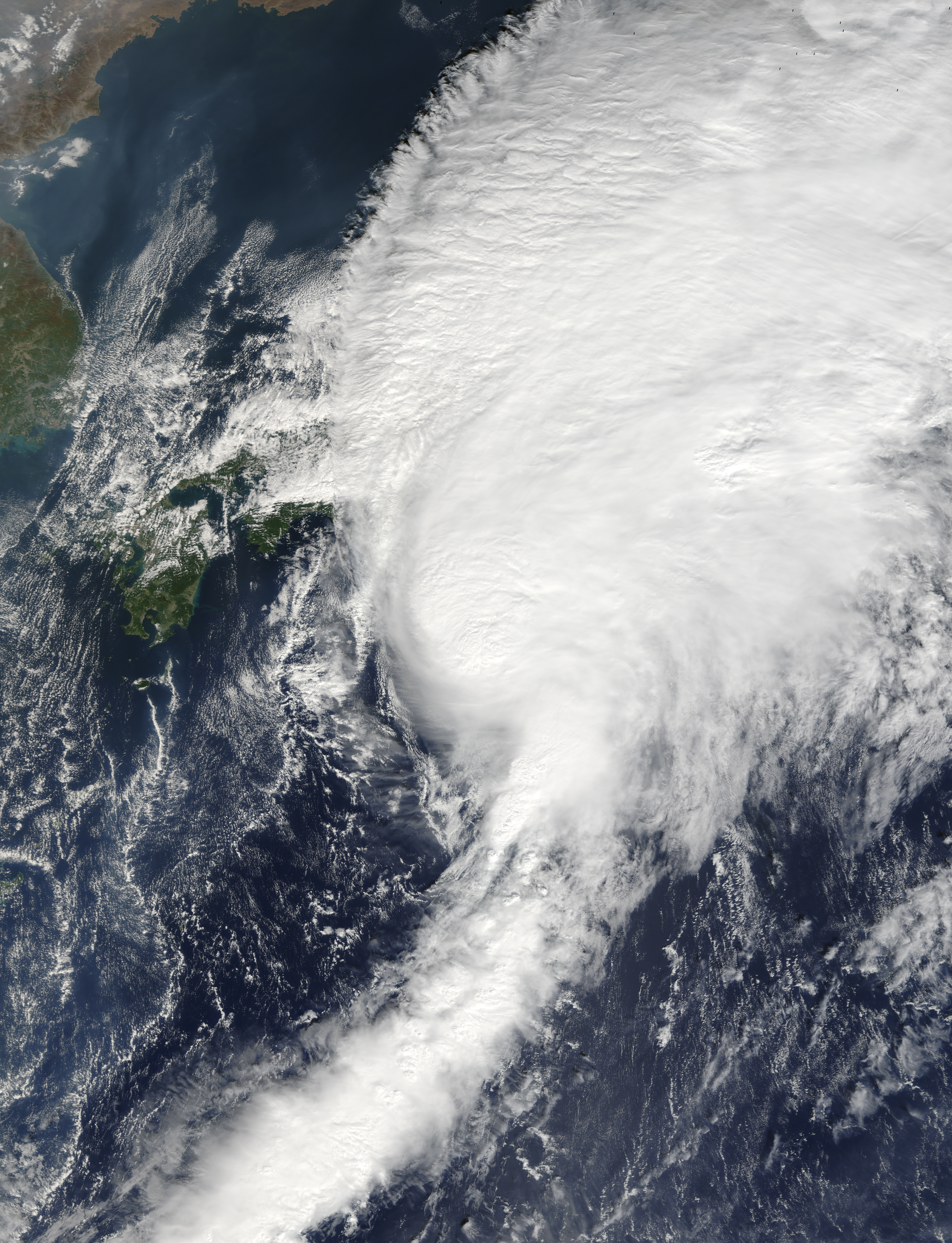
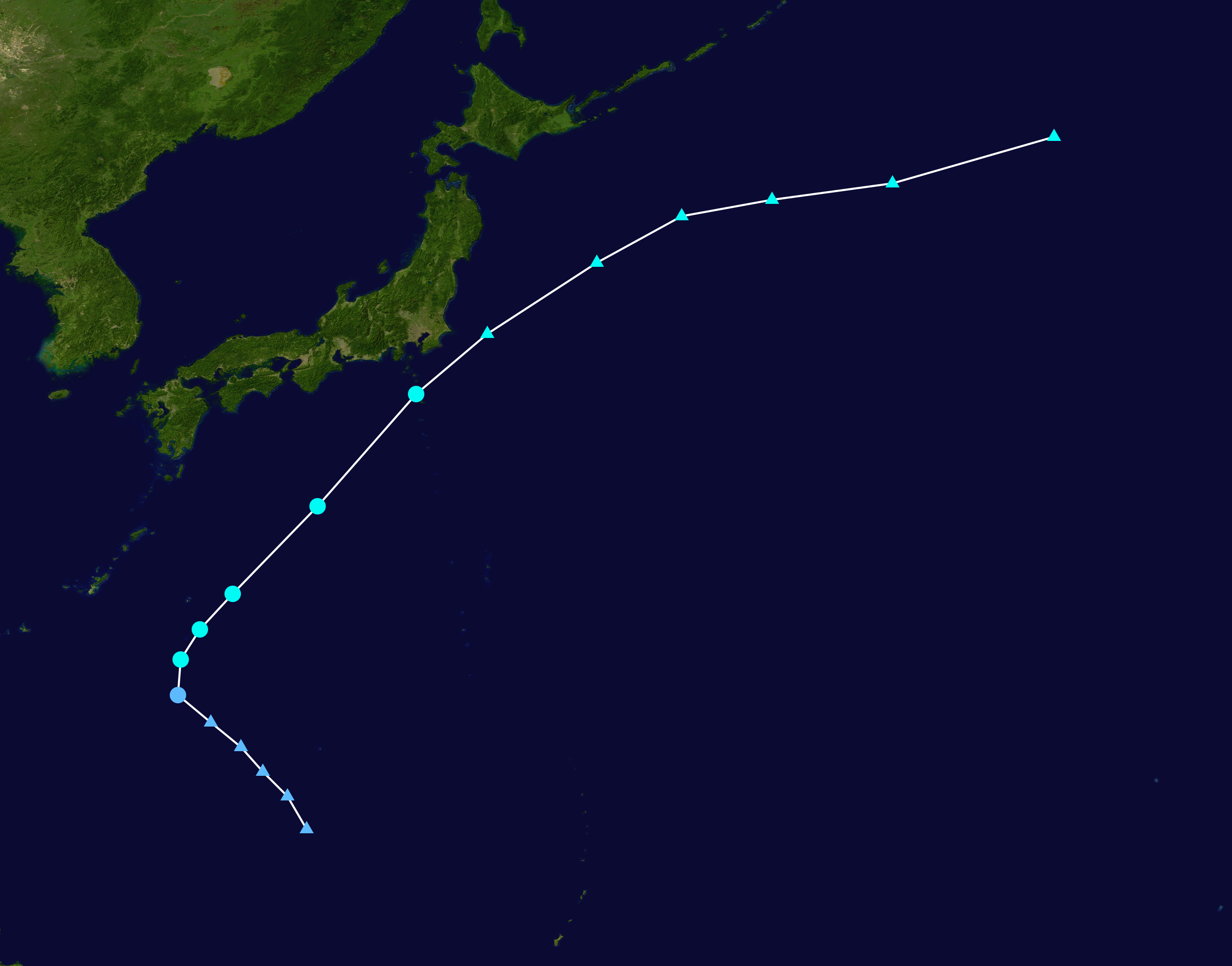
- Duration: October 25 – October 27
- Peak intensity: 100 km/h (65 mph) (10-min); 975 hPa (mbar)

On October 25, an area of disturbed weather was classified as a tropical depression by the JMA; early the next day the JMA named it Tropical Storm Faxai as it moved north-west. The JTWC picked the system up as a tropical depression early on the 26th, but declared it extratropical twelve hours later without strengthening it to a tropical storm. PAGASA declared the system Tropical Storm Juaning around the same time the JTWC picked it up. Later on October 26, the JTWC resumed advisories as a tropical storm. The JMA declared Faxai a severe tropical storm as October 27 began; the same day, the JTWC stopped issuing advisories once more due to Faxai having completed its extratropical transition. The JMA also stopped issuing advisories on the same day.

Faxai killed one person and injured three others in Japan. One home, two hectares of farmland, and 2 km (1.2 mi) of roads were damaged by the storm. At the height of the storm, 9,605 residences were without power. Heavy rains trigged seven mudslides throughout the country. One ship sank during the storm. Total damages from Faxai totaled to ¥150 million ($1.5 million US$).

=== Typhoon Peipah (Kabayan) ===
- Typhoon (JMA)
- Category 1 typhoon (SSHWS)
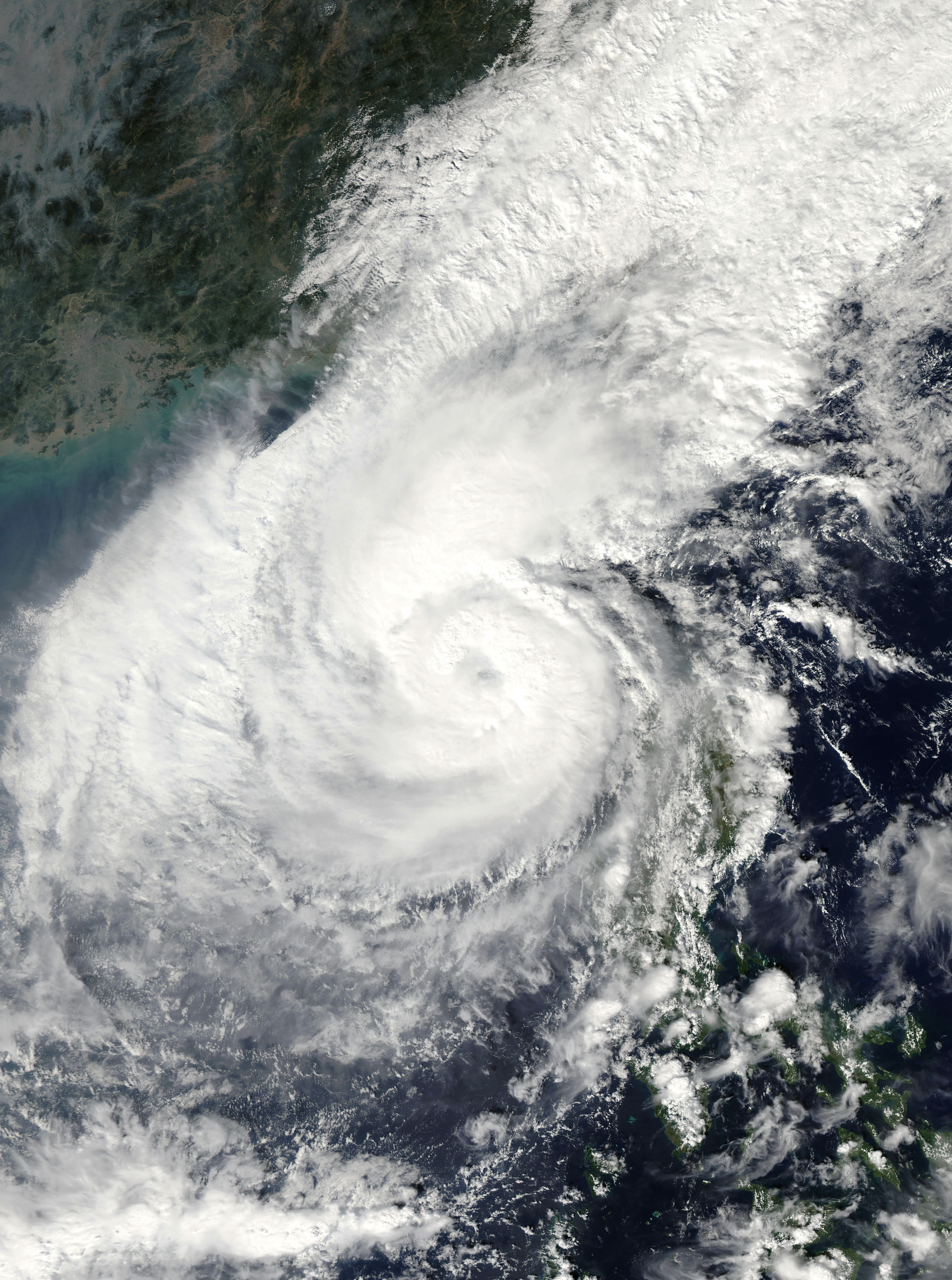
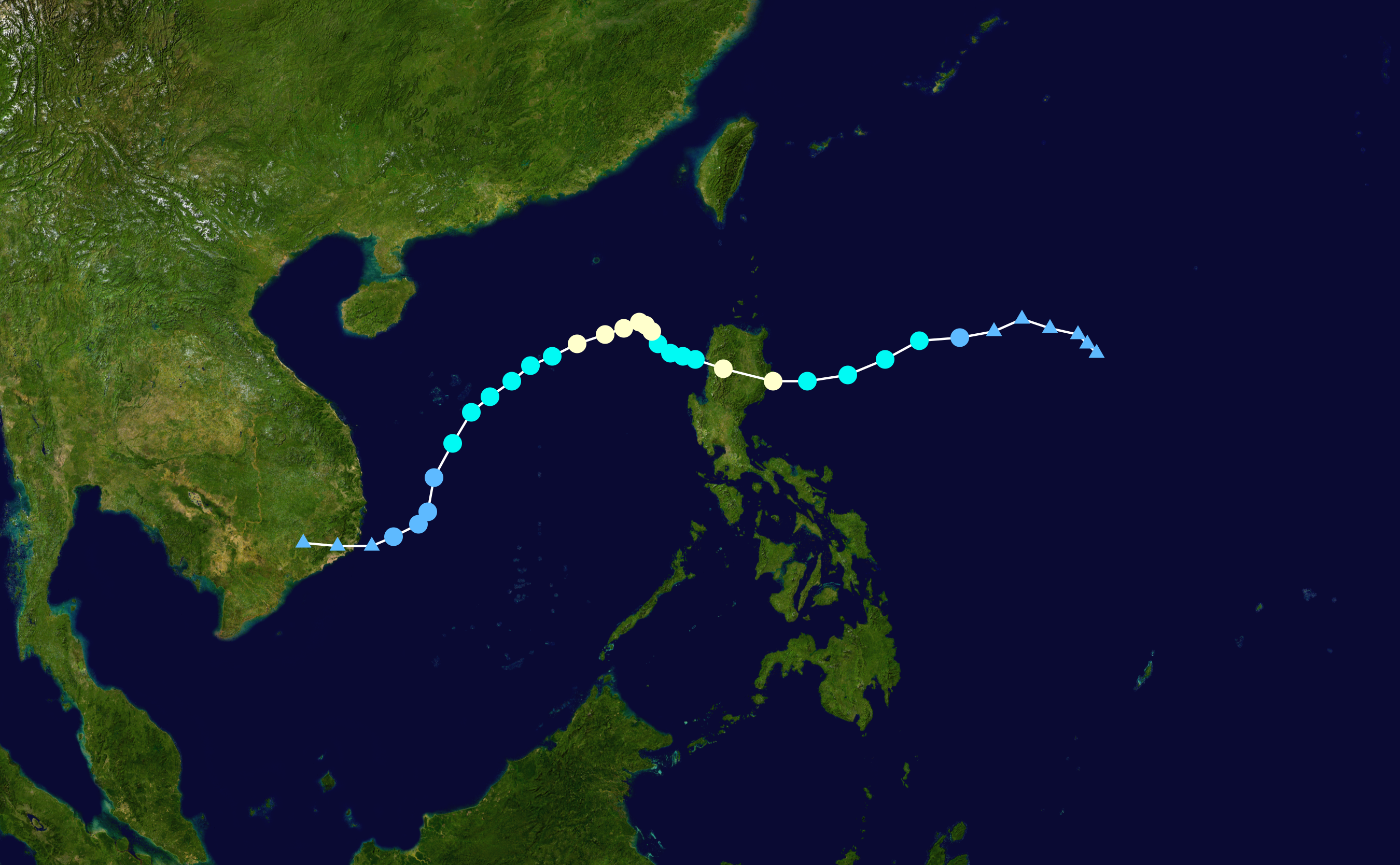
- Duration: November 3 – November 9
- Peak intensity: 130 km/h (80 mph) (10-min); 970 hPa (mbar)

An area of disturbed weather developed east of the Philippines on November 2. it was designated as Tropical Depression 21W & Tropical Depression Kabayan by PAGASA on November 3. It then went on to rapidly develop later that day and was upgraded to Tropical Storm Peipah by the JMA on November 3. Pepiah is a popular pet fish in Macau. Early on November 4 it was upgraded to a severe tropical storm. Later that day, just before landfall in the northern Philippines, the JTWC upgraded it to a typhoon. Upon landfall in Palanan, Isabela Province, it pounded strong winds over Northern Luzon, thus unroofing houses, downing power lines and blocking many roads. Once it emerged in the Philippine Sea, the JMA also upgraded it to a typhoon. The strengthening trend was short-lived, though, as hindered outflow weakened the system on November 7. It dissipated on November 9 before reaching Vietnam.

=== Tropical Storm Tapah ===
- Tropical storm (JMA)
- Tropical storm (SSHWS)
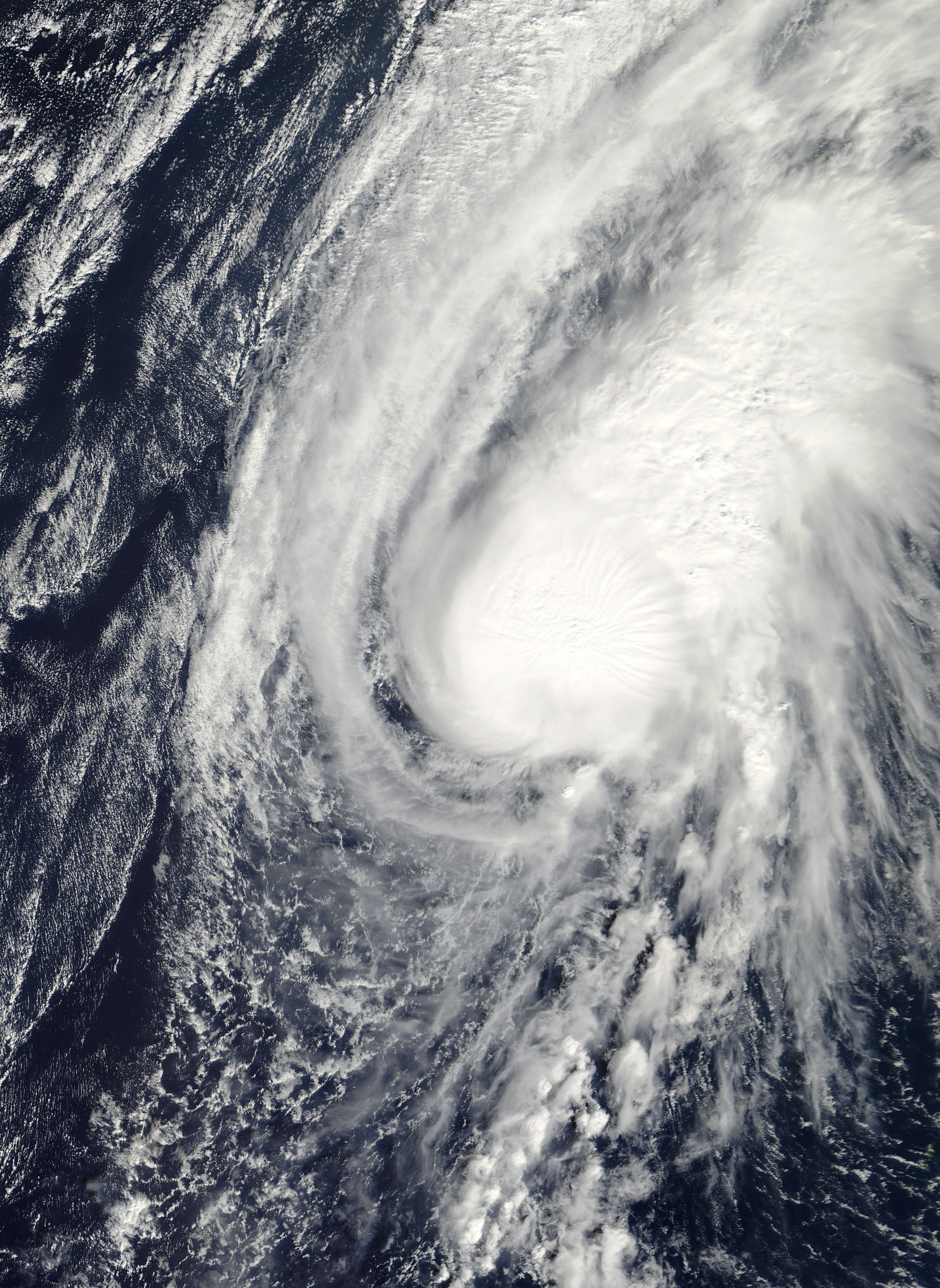
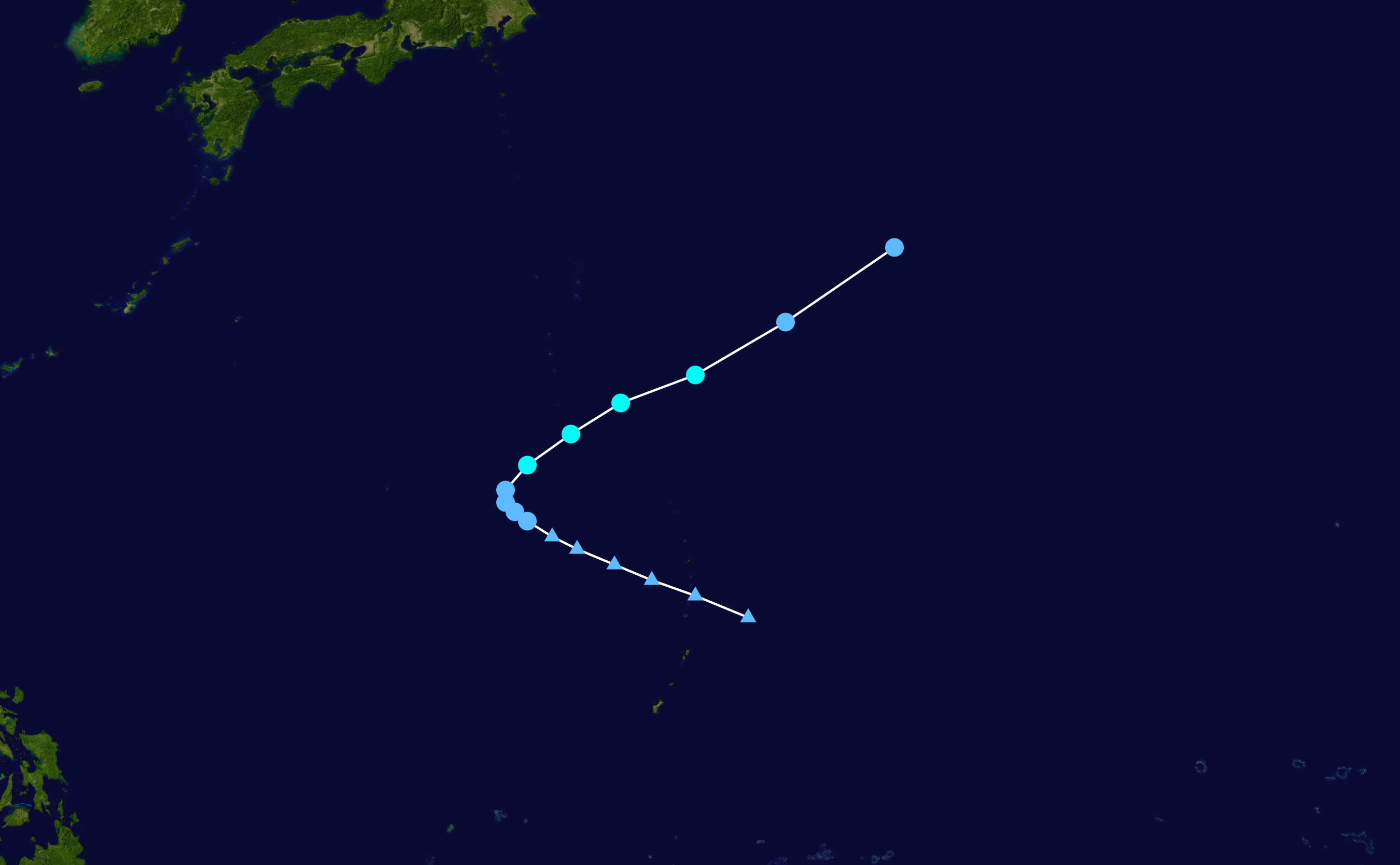
- Duration: November 11 – November 13
- Peak intensity: 65 km/h (40 mph) (10-min); 996 hPa (mbar)

Early on November 8, the JTWC reported that an area of convection had persisted about 910 km (570 mi), to the east of Guam. Quickscat data had revealed that there was weak troughing at the surface but no closed low level circulation center existed. Lying under the edge of an upper-level ridge the disturbance was in an area of moderate amount vertical windshear. Over the next couple of days an anticyclone helped to develop the disturbance so that the JMA declared it a Tropical Depression on November 11. Later that morning a TCFA, was issued by the JTWC later that morning as deep convection was now organizing into a partially exposed low level circulation center. Later that day the JTWC designated the depression, as 22W whilst it was located 530 km (330 mi), to the southwest of Iwo To. The Depression at this stage was beginning to turn towards the north with deep convection consolidating since the TCFA was released, and was strongest along the northern edge of the system which was enhanced by poleward outflow into the midlatitude westerlies. Early on November 12, the depression was upgraded to a Tropical Storm by both the JMA and the JTWC with the name Tapah being assigned whilst located to the southeast of Iwo Jima. Both 1-minute and 10-minute peak windspeeds of 65 km/h (40 mph), were reached as the JMA and the JTWC upgraded the depression to Tapah. It remained at this intensity until later that day when both the JMA and the JTWC downgraded it to a Tropical Depression, and issued their final advisories whilst it was going through an extratropical transition before it dissipated early on November 13.

=== Typhoon Hagibis (Lando) ===
- Typhoon (JMA)
- Category 1 typhoon (SSHWS)
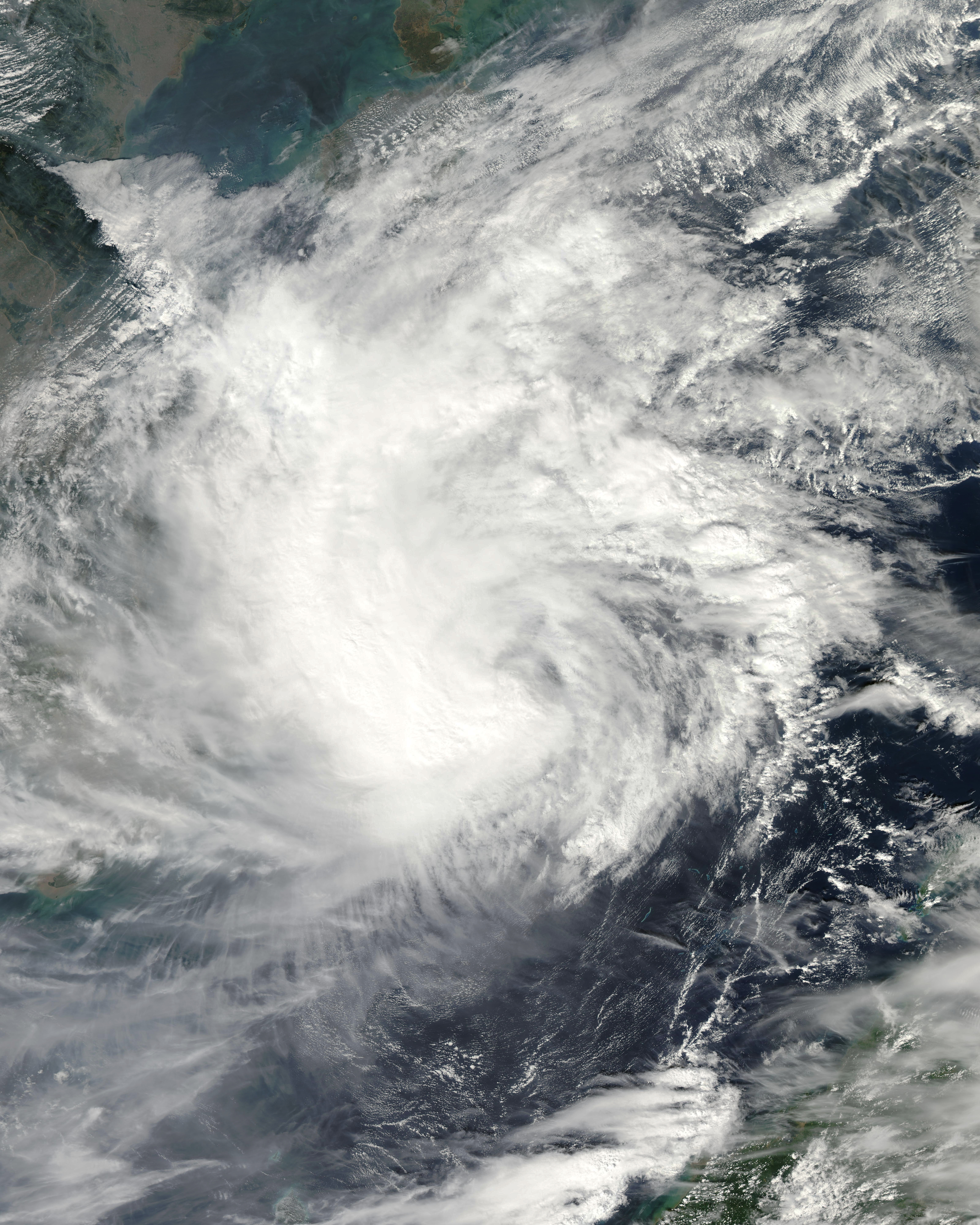
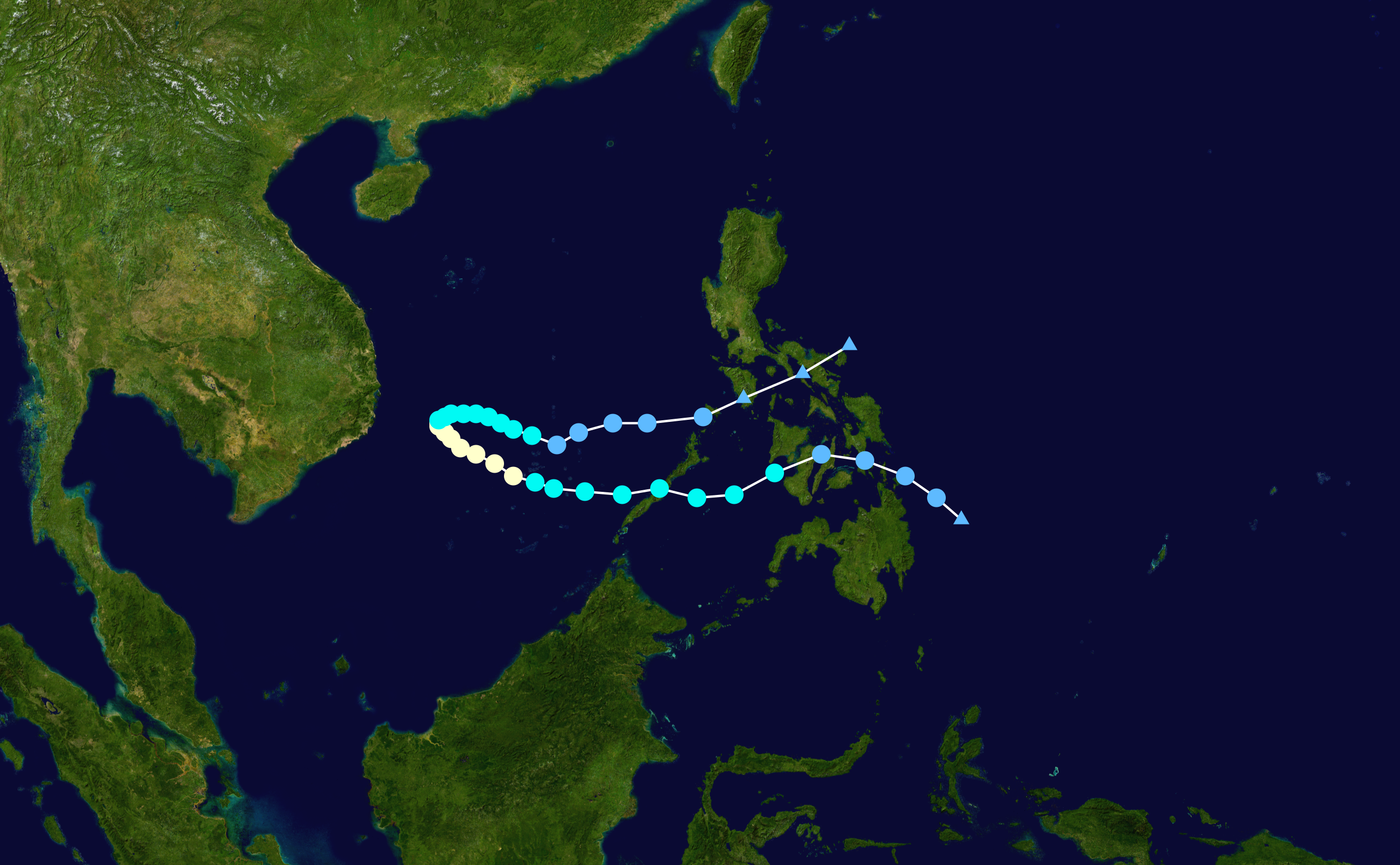
- Duration: November 18 – November 28
- Peak intensity: 130 km/h (80 mph) (10-min); 970 hPa (mbar)

On November 18, the Joint Typhoon Warning Center issued a TCFA on a Tropical Disturbance located east of the Philippines. Later that day the disturbance was upgraded to a Tropical Depression 24W by the JTWC. PAGASA also declared it Tropical Depression Lando early on November 19, and also upgraded it to a tropical storm soon after. The JTWC also upgraded it to a tropical storm that day. Early on November 21, the storm strengthened into a severe tropical storm. Later that afternoon, the JTWC upgraded Hagibis to typhoon status, and the JMA followed late that evening. The storm then wobbled off the coast of Vietnam beginning on November 22 where it gradually weakened. By November 24, due to its interaction with Typhoon Mitag, the storm turned back eastward in the South China Sea towards the Philippines once again. The JTWC issued its final advisory on November 27, although it was maintained by the JMA as it made landfall once again over the Philippines. It weakened to a depression east of the Philippines on November 28 and the JMA issued its final advisory.

Hagibis caused the deaths of nine people, all in the Visayas and Mindanao island groups.

=== Typhoon Mitag (Mina) ===
- Typhoon (JMA)
- Category 2 typhoon (SSHWS)
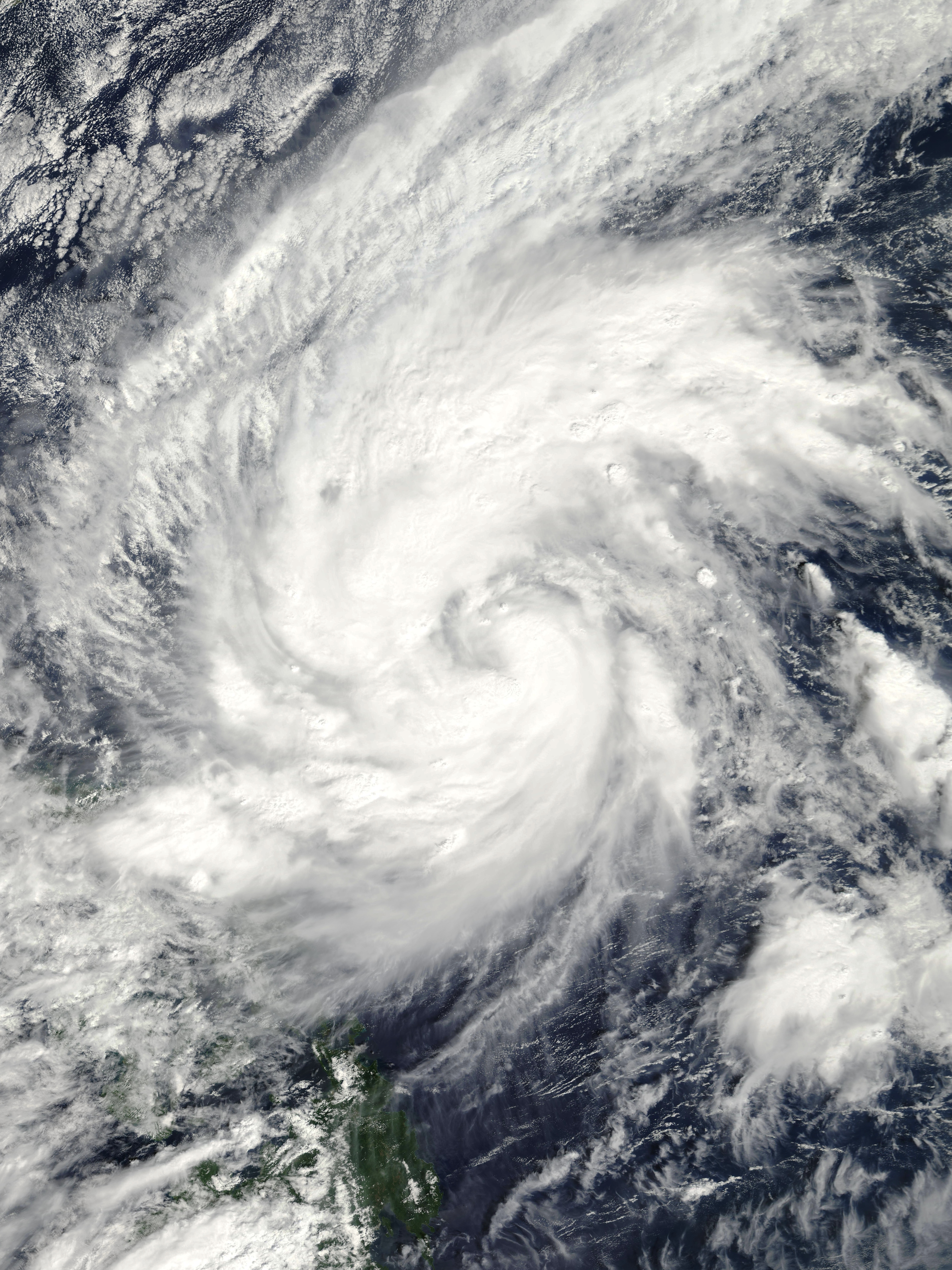
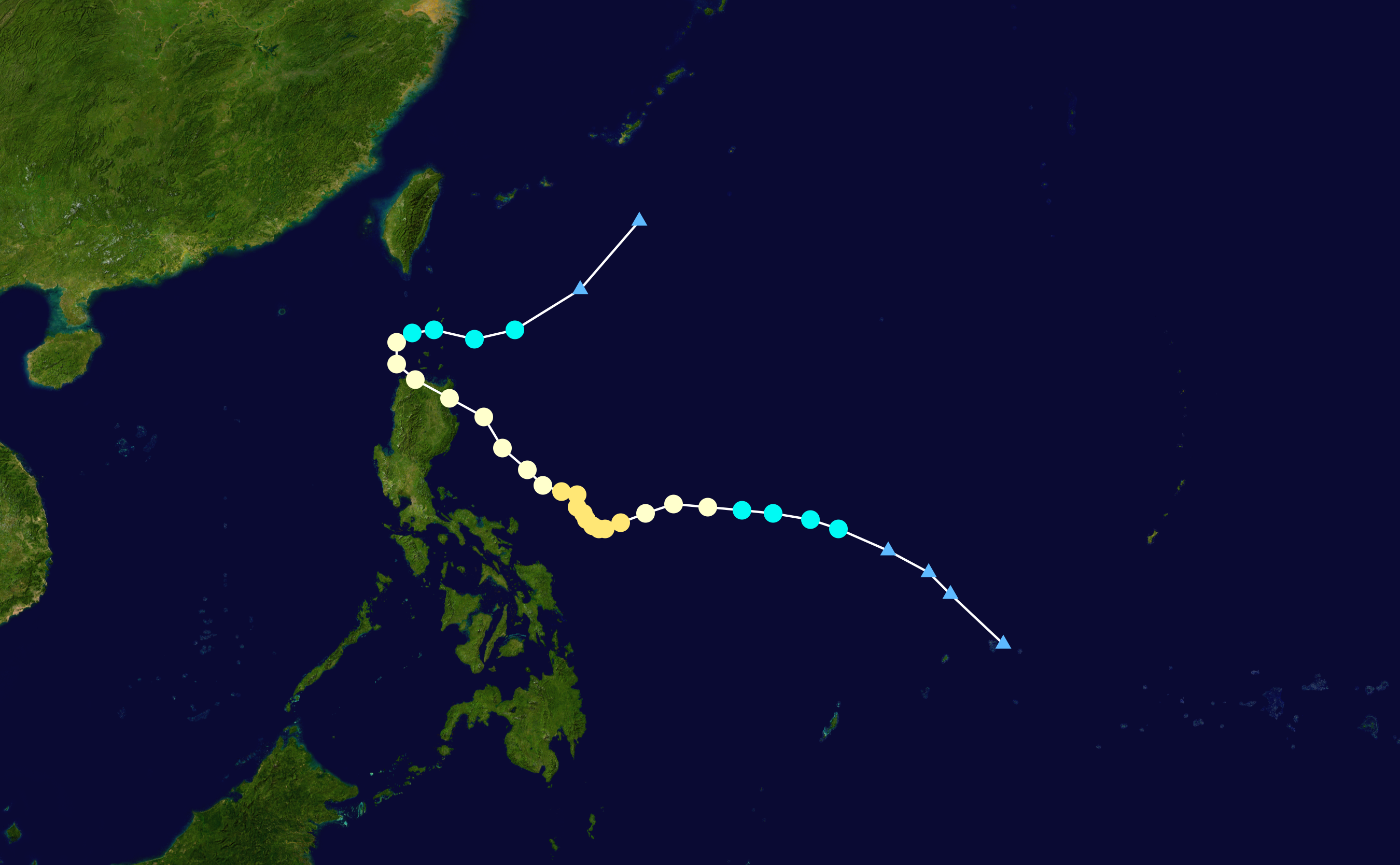
- Duration: November 20 – November 27
- Peak intensity: 150 km/h (90 mph) (10-min); 955 hPa (mbar)

On November 20 an area of disturbed weather east of the Philippines strengthened and was classified as Tropical Storm Mitag by the JMA. The JTWC followed suit not long afterwards. The storm strengthened significantly early on November 21 and became a severe tropical storm. Later that day, the JTWC upgraded Mitag to a typhoon, and the JMA also upgraded it late that evening.

Philippine officials ordered the evacuation of 200,000 people on November 23, mostly from the Bicol Region as Mitag approached the coast. Additionally, the province of Albay declared a state of calamity.

As Mitag remained stationary in the Philippine Sea for a day as a Category 2-equivalent typhoon, it changed its course and instead of hitting Catanduanes and the Bicol Region, it will make a landfall at the Aurora–Isabela area. Nonetheless, PAGASA announced that there was still a possibility for the typhoon to once again change its course. The storm turned northwest towards northern Luzon and made landfall late on November 25. It tracked across the island and was downgraded to a severe tropical storm before emerging back over water on November 26. It turned back to the east before reaching Taiwan, and became extratropical on November 27.

Ten fatalities were attributed to Mina. The remnants of Mitag contributed to heavy rains in Okinawa which damaged 3 km (1.9 mi) of roads and triggered one landslide.

=== Tropical Depression 25W (Nonoy) ===
- Tropical depression (SSHWS)
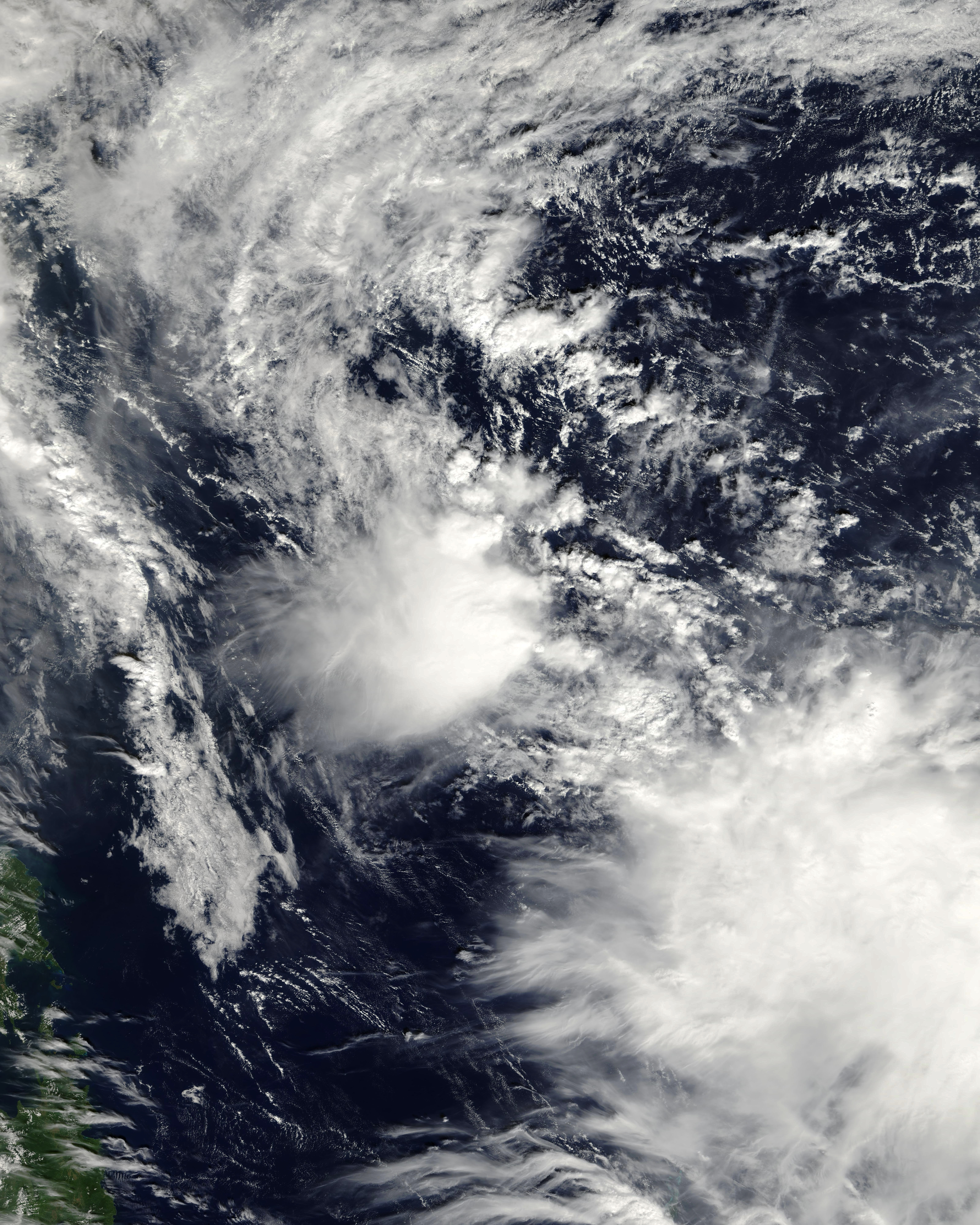
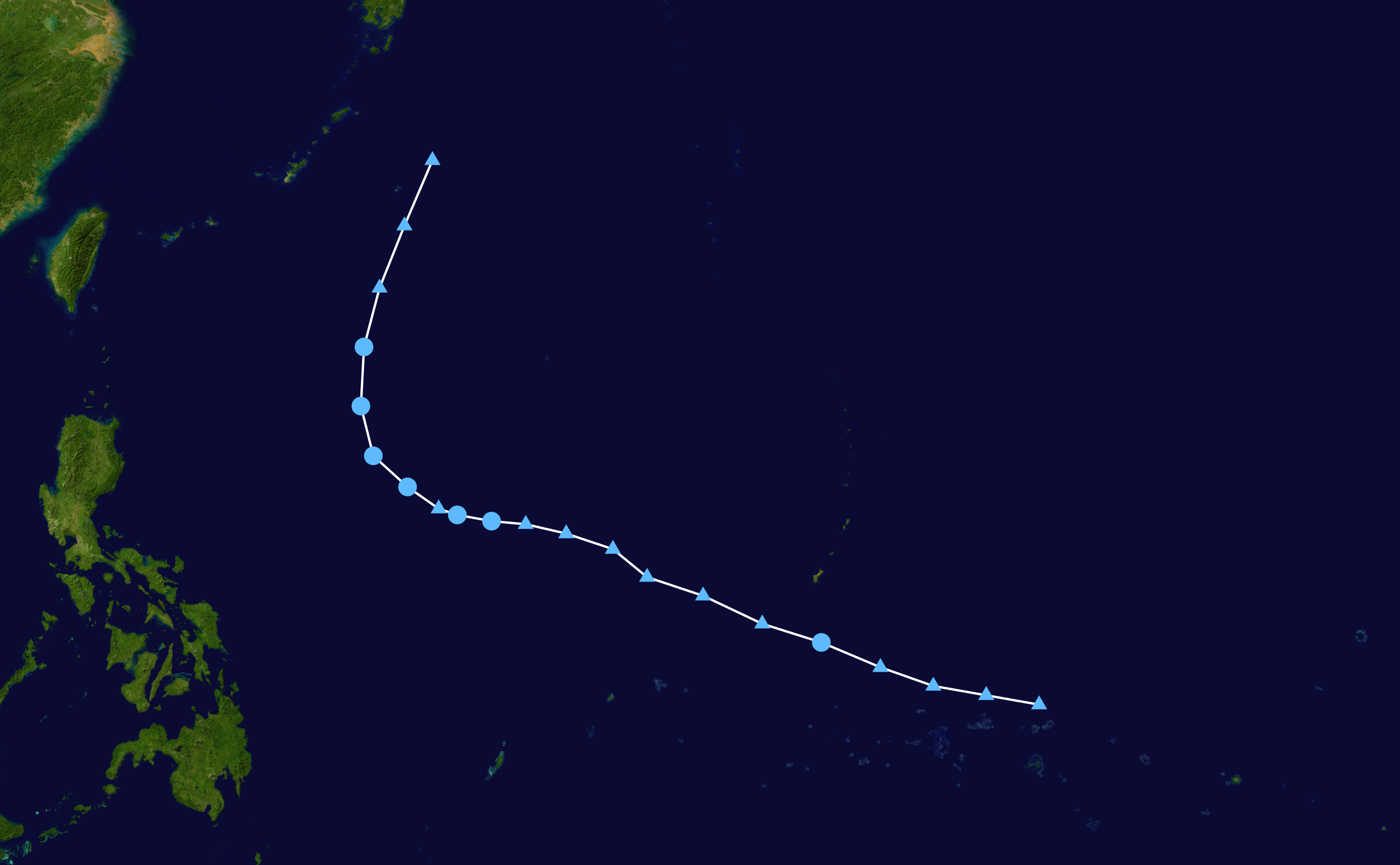
- Duration: November 25 – November 27
- Peak intensity: 45 km/h (30 mph) (1-min); 1004 hPa (mbar)

On November 24 an area of disturbed area formed about 400 nmi (740 km) south east of Guam. During the following day the JTWC issued a TCFA on the developing system whilst the JMA designated it as a minor tropical depression. On November 26 the JTWC designated the depression as Tropical depression 25W Over the next couple of days it tracked towards the north west maintaining its peak wind speeds of 25 knots (46 km/h; 29 mph). The depression then started its extra tropical transition on November 27 as it interacted with the Baroclinic zone, the JTWC then issued its final warning on 25W. This was because the depression would succumb to the increasing vertical sheer and decreasing sea surface temperatures as it completed its extra tropical transition.

=== Tropical Depression 26W ===
- Tropical depression (JMA)
- Tropical depression (SSHWS)
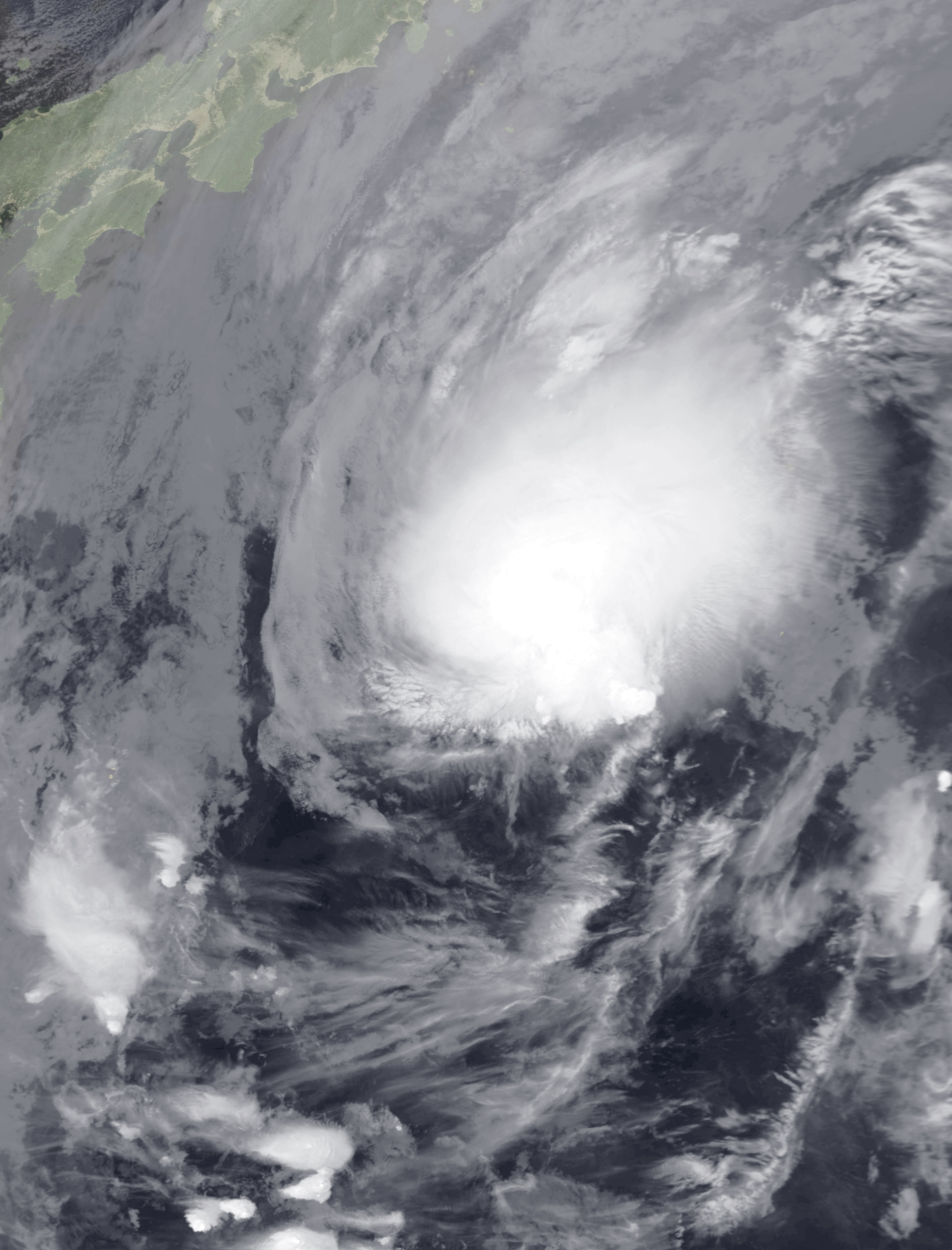
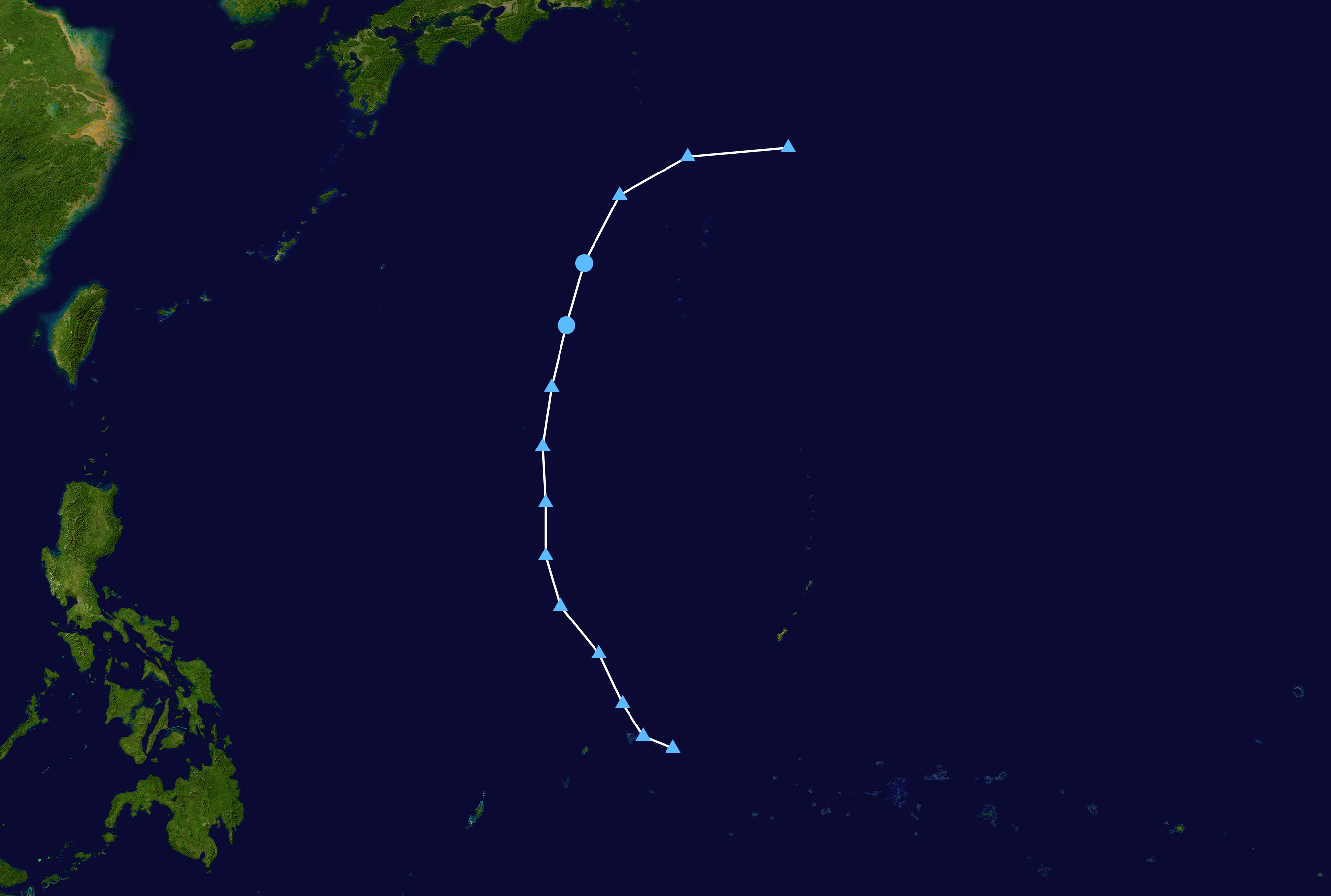
- Duration: November 28 – November 29
- Peak intensity: 45 km/h (30 mph) (10-min); 998 hPa (mbar)

Possibly from the remnants of 25W, an area of disturbed weather formed south-east of Yap on November 26. The next day the JTWC issued a TCFA on the developing system. On November 28, the JMA declared it as a minor tropical depression, whilst later that day the JTWC followed suit and designated it as a tropical depression, with the JTWC assigning the number 26W to the depression. However the Tropical depression quickly became extratropical later that day with the JTWC issuing their final advisory on the storm later that day. However the JMA continued to monitor the Depression until it dissipated the next day.

== Storm names ==
Within the Northwest Pacific Ocean, both the Japan Meteorological Agency (JMA) and the Philippine Atmospheric, Geophysical and Astronomical Services Administration (PAGASA) assign names to tropical cyclones that develop in the Western Pacific, which can result in a tropical cyclone having two names. The Japan Meteorological Agency's RSMC Tokyo – Typhoon Center assigns international names to tropical cyclones on behalf of the World Meteorological Organization's Typhoon Committee, should they be judged to have 10-minute sustained windspeeds of 65 km/h (40 mph). PAGASA names tropical cyclones which move into or form as a tropical depression in their area of responsibility located between 135°E and 115°E and between 5°N and 25°N, even if the cyclone has had an international name assigned to it. The names of significant tropical cyclones are retired, by both PAGASA and the Typhoon Committee. Should the list of names for the Philippine region be exhausted then names will be taken from an auxiliary list of which the first ten are published each season. Unused names are marked in gray.

=== International names ===
During the season 24 tropical storms developed in the Western Pacific and each one was named by the JMA, when the system was judged to have 10-minute sustained windspeeds of 65 km/h (40 mph). The JMA selected the names from a list of 140 names, that had been developed by the 14 members nations and territories of the ESCAP/WMO Typhoon Committee. During the season, the name Peipah was used for the first time, after it replaced the name Vamei used in the 2001 season. No international names were retired following the 2007 season.

Kong-rey	Yutu	Toraji	Man-yi	Usagi	Pabuk	Wutip	Sepat	Fitow	Danas	Nari	Wipha
Francisco	Lekima	Krosa	Haiyan	Podul	Lingling	Kajiki	Faxai	Peipah	Tapah	Mitag	Hagibis

=== Philippines ===
Amang	Bebeng	Chedeng	Dodong	Egay
Falcon	Goring	Hanna	Ineng	Juaning
Kabayan	Lando	Mina	Nonoy	Onyok (unused)
Pedring (unused)	Quiel (unused)	Ramon (unused)	Sendong (unused)	Tisoy (unused)
Ursula (unused)	Viring (unused)	Weng (unused)	Yoyoy (unused)	Zigzag (unused)
Auxiliary list
Abe (unused)	Berto (unused)	Charo (unused)	Dado (unused)	Estoy (unused)
Felion (unused)	Gening (unused)	Herman (unused)	Irma (unused)	Jaime (unused)

The Philippine Atmospheric, Geophysical and Astronomical Services Administration uses its own naming scheme for tropical cyclones in their area of responsibility. PAGASA assigns names to tropical depressions that form within their area of responsibility and any tropical cyclone that might move into their area of responsibility. Should the list of names for a given year prove to be insufficient, names are taken from an auxiliary list, the first 10 of which are published each year before the season starts. This is the same list used in the 2003 season, except for the names Bebeng, Goring, Hanna, Lando, Mina, Nonoy, Pedring, Ramon, Sendong, Charo, Dado, Felion, Herman, Irma, and Jaime, which replaced Batibot, Gilas, Harurot, Lakay, Manang, Niña, Pogi, Roskas, Sikat, Charing, Danggit, Fuego, Hantik, Irog, and Joker.

Storms were named Hanna, Lando, Mina, and Nonoy for the first time; Bebeng and Goring were carried on from the previous lists, having been last assigned in 1999 and 1997 respectively. Names that were not assigned are marked in gray. No names were retired following the 2007 season.

== Season effects ==
This table summarizes all the systems that developed within or moved into the North Pacific Ocean, to the west of the International Date Line during 2007. The tables also provide an overview of a systems intensity, duration, land areas affected and any deaths or damages associated with the system.

Name	Dates	Peak intensity			Areas affected	Damage (USD)	Deaths	Ref(s).
Name	Dates	Category	Wind speed	Pressure	Areas affected	Damage (USD)	Deaths	Ref(s).
TD	January 5	Tropical depression	Not specified	1,006 hPa (29.71 inHg)	None	None	None	
TD	March 6–7	Tropical depression	Not specified	1,002 hPa (29.59 inHg)	None	None	None	
Kong-rey	March 30 – April 6	Typhoon	150 km/h (93 mph)	960 hPa (28.35 inHg)	Mariana Islands	$10,000	None	
Yutu (Amang)	May 17–23	Very strong typhoon	175 km/h (109 mph)	935 hPa (27.61 inHg)	None	None	None	
TD	June 29	Tropical depression	Not specified	1,006 hPa (29.71 inHg)	Caroline Islands	None	None	
TD	July 2	Tropical depression	Not specified	1,006 hPa (29.71 inHg)	Caroline Islands	None	None	
Toraji	July 3–5	Tropical storm	65 km/h (40 mph)	994 hPa (29.35 inHg)	China, Vietnam	$9.7 million	None	
Man-yi (Bebeng)	July 7–16	Very strong typhoon	175 km/h (109 mph)	930 hPa (27.46 inHg)	Japan, Aleutian Islands	$499 million	6	
Cosme	July 25	Tropical depression	Not specified	1,010 hPa (29.83 inHg)	None	None	None	
Usagi	July 29 – August 4	Very strong typhoon	165 km/h (103 mph)	945 hPa (27.91 inHg)	Japan, Korean Peninsula, Russia	$225 million	Unknown	
06W	August 2–8	Tropical depression	55 km/h (34 mph)	994 hPa (29.35 inHg)	China, Vietnam	$7.5 million	77	
Pabuk (Chedeng)	August 4–14	Typhoon	120 km/h (75 mph)	975 hPa (28.79 inHg)	Philippines, Taiwan, Eastern China, Korean Peninsula, Russian Far East	$227 million	15	
Wutip (Dodong)	August 7–8	Tropical storm	65 km/h (40 mph)	990 hPa (29.23 inHg)	Philippines, Taiwan	Unknown	3	
TD	August 10–12	Tropical depression	Not specified	992 hPa (29.29 inHg)	East China	None	None	
TD	August 11–12	Tropical depression	Not specified	1,006 hPa (29.71 inHg)	None	None	None	
Sepat (Egay)	August 12–24	Violent typhoon	205 km/h (127 mph)	910 hPa (26.87 inHg)	Philippines, Taiwan, China	$693 million	43	
TD	August 14–15	Tropical depression	Not specified	1,002 hPa (29.59 inHg)	East China, Ryukyu Islands	None	None	
TD	August 14–17	Tropical depression	Not specified	996 hPa (29.41 inHg)	South China	None	None	
TD	August 21–22	Tropical depression	Not specified	1,006 hPa (29.71 inHg)	None	None	None	
TD	August 25–30	Tropical depression	Not specified	1,002 hPa (29.59 inHg)	Taiwan, East China, Korean Peninsula, Japan	None	None	
Fitow	August 27 – September 7	Typhoon	130 km/h (81 mph)	975 hPa (28.79 inHg)	Japan, Russian Far East	$1 billion	3	
TD	August 31	Tropical depression	Not specified	1,016 hPa (30.00 inHg)	None	None	None	
Danas	September 6–11	Severe tropical storm	100 km/h (62 mph)	990 hPa (29.23 inHg)	None	None	None	
TD	September 9–14	Tropical depression	Not specified	1,000 hPa (29.53 inHg)	Ryukyu Islands, East China	None	None	
Nari (Falcon)	September 11–17	Very strong typhoon	185 km/h (115 mph)	935 hPa (27.61 inHg)	Japan, South Korea	$393 million	23	
Wipha (Goring)	September 15–20	Very strong typhoon	185 km/h (115 mph)	925 hPa (27.32 inHg)	Taiwan, China	$1.3 billion	20	
14W	September 19–21	Tropical depression	55 km/h (34 mph)	1,004 hPa (29.65 inHg)	None	None	None	
Francisco	September 21–26	Tropical storm	75 km/h (47 mph)	990 hPa (29.23 inHg)	China, Vietnam, Laos, Thailand, Cambodia	Unknown	Unknown	
TD	September 24–25	Tropical depression	Not specified	1,006 hPa (29.71 inHg)	None	None	None	
TD	September 27–28	Tropical depression	Not specified	1,002 hPa (29.59 inHg)	None	None	None	
Lekima (Hanna)	September 28 – October 4	Severe tropical storm	110 km/h (68 mph)	975 hPa (28.79 inHg)	Philippines, Vietnam	$131 million	110	
Haiyan	September 30 – October 7	Tropical storm	75 km/h (47 mph)	994 hPa (29.35 inHg)	None	None	None	
Krosa (Ineng)	October 1–8	Violent typhoon	195 km/h (121 mph)	925 hPa (27.32 inHg)	Taiwan, China	$1.7 billion	5	
Podul	October 6–7	Severe tropical storm	100 km/h (62 mph)	985 hPa (29.09 inHg)	None	None	None	
Lingling	October 10–15	Tropical storm	85 km/h (53 mph)	994 hPa (29.35 inHg)	None	None	None	
Kajiki	October 18–22	Very strong typhoon	165 km/h (103 mph)	945 hPa (27.91 inHg)	None	None	None	
Faxai (Juaning)	October 25–27	Severe tropical storm	100 km/h (62 mph)	975 hPa (28.79 inHg)	Japan	$1.5 million	1	
TD	October 29–30	Tropical depression	Not specified	1,004 hPa (29.65 inHg)	Vietnam, Cambodia	None	None	
Peipah (Kabayan)	November 1–10	Typhoon	130 km/h (81 mph)	970 hPa (28.64 inHg)	Philippines, Vietnam	Unknown	50	
TD	November 2–3	Tropical depression	Not specified	1,006 hPa (29.71 inHg)	Vietnam	None	None	
Tapah	November 11–13	Tropical storm	65 km/h (40 mph)	996 hPa (29.41 inHg)	None	None	None	
Mitag (Mina)	November 20–28	Typhoon	150 km/h (93 mph)	955 hPa (28.20 inHg)	Philippines	$19.8 million	71	
Hagibis (Lando)	November 18–27	Typhoon	130 km/h (81 mph)	970 hPa (28.64 inHg)	Philippines, Vietnam	$5.3 million	22	
25W (Nonoy)	November 25–27	Tropical depression	45 km/h (28 mph)	1,004 hPa (29.65 inHg)	None	None	None	
26W	November 28–29	Tropical depression	45 km/h (28 mph)	998 hPa (29.47 inHg)	None	None	None	
Season aggregates
45 systems	January 5 – November 29, 2007		205 km/h (127 mph)	910 hPa (26.87 inHg)		$6.21 billion	449	

== See also ==
- Tropical cyclones in 2007
- Pacific typhoon season
- List of wettest tropical cyclones
- 2007 Pacific hurricane season
- 2007 Atlantic hurricane season
- 2007 North Indian Ocean cyclone season
- South-West Indian Ocean cyclone seasons: 2006–07, 2007–08
- Australian region cyclone seasons: 2006–07, 2007–08
- South Pacific cyclone seasons: 2006–07, 2007–08
