= Sepat =

Sepat may refer to:

- the Ancient Egyptian name for the regional divisions of the country. The Greek term nomos has been used in its place since the Ptolemaic period
- Typhoon Sepat (disambiguation), the name of various weather disturbances in the north Pacific Ocean
- Tanjung Sepat, Pahang, a town in Pahang in Malaysia
- Tanjung Sepat, Selangor, a town in Selangor, Malaysia
