= Timeline of the 2011 Pacific typhoon season =

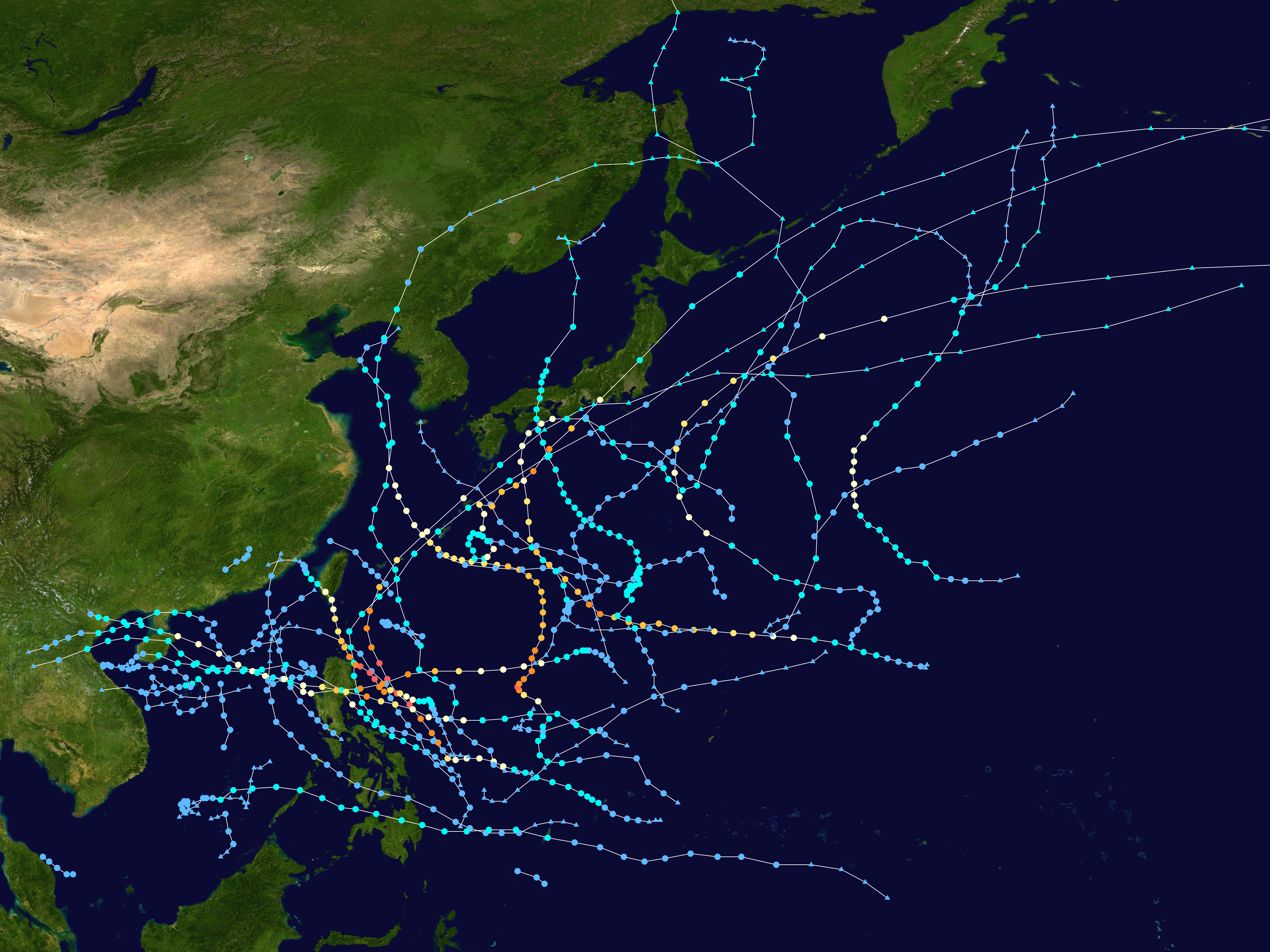
- Season summary map

Season boundaries
- First system formed: April 1, 2011
- Last system dissipated: January 1, 2012

Strongest system
- Name: Songda
- Maximum winds: 195 km/h (120 mph) (10-minute sustained)
- Lowest pressure: 920 hPa (mbar)

Longest lasting system
- Name: Muifa
- Duration: 15 days
Storm articles
- Tropical Storm Aere (2011)
- Typhoon Songda (2011)
- Tropical Storm Sarika (2011)
- Tropical Storm Meari (2011)
- Typhoon Ma-on (2011)
- Tropical Storm Nock-ten (2011)
- Typhoon Muifa (2011)
- Typhoon Nanmadol (2011)
- Tropical Storm Talas (2011)
- Typhoon Roke (2011)
- Typhoon Nesat (2011)
- Typhoon Nalgae (2011)
- Tropical Storm Washi

This timeline documents all of the events of the 2011 Pacific typhoon season, the period that tropical cyclones formed in the Western Pacific Ocean in 2011. Most of the tropical cyclones formed between May and November 2011. The scope of this article is limited to the Pacific Ocean, north of the equator between 100°E and the International Date Line. Tropical storms that form in the entire Western Pacific basin are assigned a name by the Japan Meteorological Agency (JMA). Tropical depressions that form in this basin are given a number with a "W" suffix by the United States' Joint Typhoon Warning Center (JTWC). In addition, the Philippine Atmospheric, Geophysical and Astronomical Services Administration (PAGASA) assigns names to tropical cyclones (including tropical depressions) that enter or form in the Philippine area of responsibility. These names, however, are not in common use outside of the Philippines.

During the season, a total of 40 systems were designated as Tropical Depressions by either the Japan Meteorological Agency (JMA), the Philippine Atmospheric, Geophysical and Astronomical Services Administration (PAGASA), the Joint Typhoon Warning Center (JTWC), or other national meteorological and hydrological services such as the China Meteorological Administration and the Hong Kong Observatory. Because the JMA runs the Regional Specialized Meteorological Centre for the Western Pacific, it assigns names to Tropical Depressions should they intensify into a tropical storm. PAGASA also assigns local names to tropical depressions which form within their area of responsibility; however, these names are not in common use outside of PAGASA's area of responsibility.

For the PAGASA, 19 systems formed or entered in area of responsibility during 2011, which 10 of them directly made landfall over the Philippines. No tropical cyclones formed during January to March. The season started on April 1 with the formation of Tropical Depression 01W.

== Timeline ==
=== January ===
January 1

- The 2011 Pacific typhoon season officially starts; no tropical cyclones developed during January.

=== February ===
- No tropical cyclones formed during February.

=== March ===
March 30

- 1800 UTC - A disturbance formed southwest of Yap.

March 31

- 0600 UTC - The disturbance continued and intensified to a depression the next day.

=== April ===
April 1

- 0600 UTC — The JMA reports that a tropical depression has developed, about 510 km (315 mi) to the southeast of Ho Chi Minh City in Southern Vietnam.

April 2

- 0300 UTC — The JTWC initiates advisories on the tropical depression and designates it as Tropical Depression 01W.
- 1200 UTC — The JTWC reports that Tropical Depression 01W has reached its peak intensity, with 1 — minute sustained windspeeds of 55 km/h (35 mph).

April 3

- 0900 UTC — The JTWC issues its final advisory on Tropical Depression 01W, as the system weakens into a tropical disturbance.

- 02W entered the Philippine area of responsibility receiving the name Amang.

- 1800 UTC — The JTWC reports that

April 4

- 0600 UTC — The JMA issues its final advisory on Tropical Depression 01W.

April 6

- 1200 UTC - Tropical Depression Amang dissipates as it rapidly moves northeast.

=== May ===
May 5

- 0600 UTC - The JMA started monitoring a disturbance from a monsoon trough.

May 6

- 0300 UTC - The PAGASA received the name Bebeng as it slowly intensifies, bringing intense rainfall over the Philippines.
- 0900 UTC - The JTWC finally recognizes the system as Tropical Depression 03W.

May 7

- 0000 UTC - The JMA upgraded it to Tropical Storm Aere as it now steadily intensifies in the Philippine Sea.

May 8

- 0900 UTC - Aere reaches peak intensity as a strong tropical storm but failed to be a Severe Tropical Storm, or even a minimal typhoon.
- 1300 UTC - Tropical Storm Aere slowly weakens as it destructs Philippines on May 8.

May 12

- 0300 UTC - Tropical Depression Aere dissipates over Japan.

May 13

- 2100 UTC - The remnants of Aere had completely dissipated as it was absorbed by a developing extratropical system.

May 19

- 0000 UTC - A newly formed tropical disturbance was classified by the JTWC.
- 1500 UTC - Due to favorable conditions of this new system, the JMA classified it as a weak tropical depression.

May 20

- 0600 UTC - The JTWC now classifies it as a tropical depression, giving the designation 04W.

May 21

- 0000 UTC - 04W strengthens into a Tropical Storm, naming it Songda as it grew larger in size.
- 0900 UTC - The PAGASA sees Tropical Storm Songda entering their area giving the name Chedeng.

May 23

- 2100 UTC - The JMA classifies Songda to a severe tropical storm.
- 2200 UTC - Songda starts its rapid deepening phase.

May 24

- 1200 UTC - Severe Tropical Storm Songda rapidly intensifies into a Typhoon as it hits eastern Philippines.

May 25

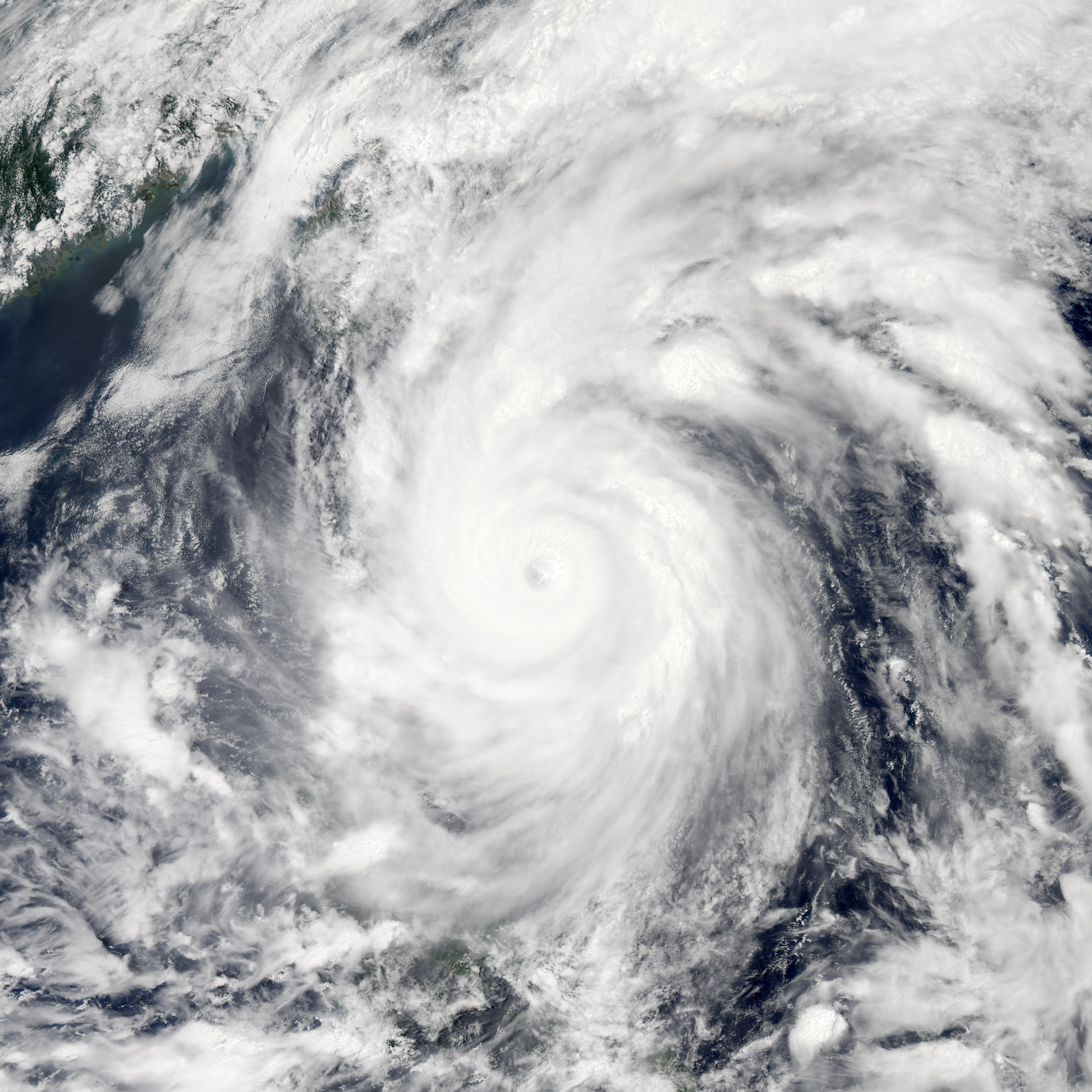
Typhoon Songda weakening as a Category 3 early on May 27

- 0900 UTC - Typhoon Songda maintain its strength as a Category 5 super typhoon.
- 1200 UTC - Songa ends its rapid deepening phase as it starts to rapidly weaken.

May 29

- 0600 UTC - Typhoon Songda dissipates in the same area where Aere dissipates.

May 31

- 0600 UTC - Just like Aere, the remnants of Songda finally dissipate.
- 1500 UTC - The JMA reports that a weak depression embedded from the monsoon, developed east of the Philippines bringing heavy rainfall.
- 1800 UTC - The PAGASA classified it as an Active Low-Pressure Area (ALPA).

=== June ===
June 2

- 0600 UTC - The depression dissipated as it failed to become a weak tropical storm.

June 8

- 0300 UTC - A low pressure area formed west of Cebu City.
- 1200 UTC - It was upgraded to Tropical Depression Dodong later that day.

June 10

- 0600 UTC - The JMA upgrades it to Tropical Storm Sarika as it moves north with only few convection.
- 0900 UTC - The JTWC classified it as a tropical depression.

June 11

- 1500 UTC - Sarika weakens at moves north towards Taiwan.
- 1800 UTC - Both agencies made their final advisories on Sarika as it made landfall over Southern China.
- 2100 UTC - Tropical Storm Sarika dissipates over southern China and Hong Kong.

June 14

- 0300 UTC - A tropical disturbance formed southwest of Manila, Philippines and rapidly intensified into a tropical depression by the JMA.

June 15

- 0600 UTC - The depression became disorganized as it finally dissipated, without the PAGASA naming it.
- 1500 UTC - The JTWC monitors a zone of disturbed weather over southeast of Manila, Philippines.

June 16

- 0300 UTC - The JTWC classifies it as a weak disturbance.
- 1200 UTC - It then rapidly intensified and was classified as Tropical Depression 06W as it steadily moved towards favorable conditions.

June 17

- 0000 UTC - The PAGASA upgraded the LPA to Tropical Depression Egay as it is now located east of the Philippines.
- 1800 UTC - Only the JTWC upgraded 06W to a tropical storm, while JMA classifies it as a tropical depression.

June 20

- 1500 UTC - 06W (Egay) weakens.
- 1600 UTC - A tropical depression formed from an Intertropical Convergence Zone (ITCZ).

June 21

- 0000 UTC - 06W degenerates to a tropical depression a it finally moves towards warm waters.
- 0600 UTC - Tropical Storm Haima exits the PAR and PAGASA made its final advisories on Egay as it brings heavy rains over eastern Philippines.
- 1200 UTC - Tropical Depression Egay becomes Tropical Storm Haima by the JMA as it enters the South China Sea.
- 1500 UTC - PAGASA expects 2 low-pressure areas entering the PAR as one of them has intensified into a tropical depression.
- 1800 UTC - The tropical depression was seen by the PAGASA and was named Falcon.
- 2100 UTC - The JTWC made warnings of Falcon to Tropical Depression 07W as it moves northwest towards a large area of convection and a cluster of thunderstorms.

June 22

- 0000 UTC - Tropical Depression Falcon absorbed more rainbands from the active ITCZ as it became a Tropical Storm naming it Meari.

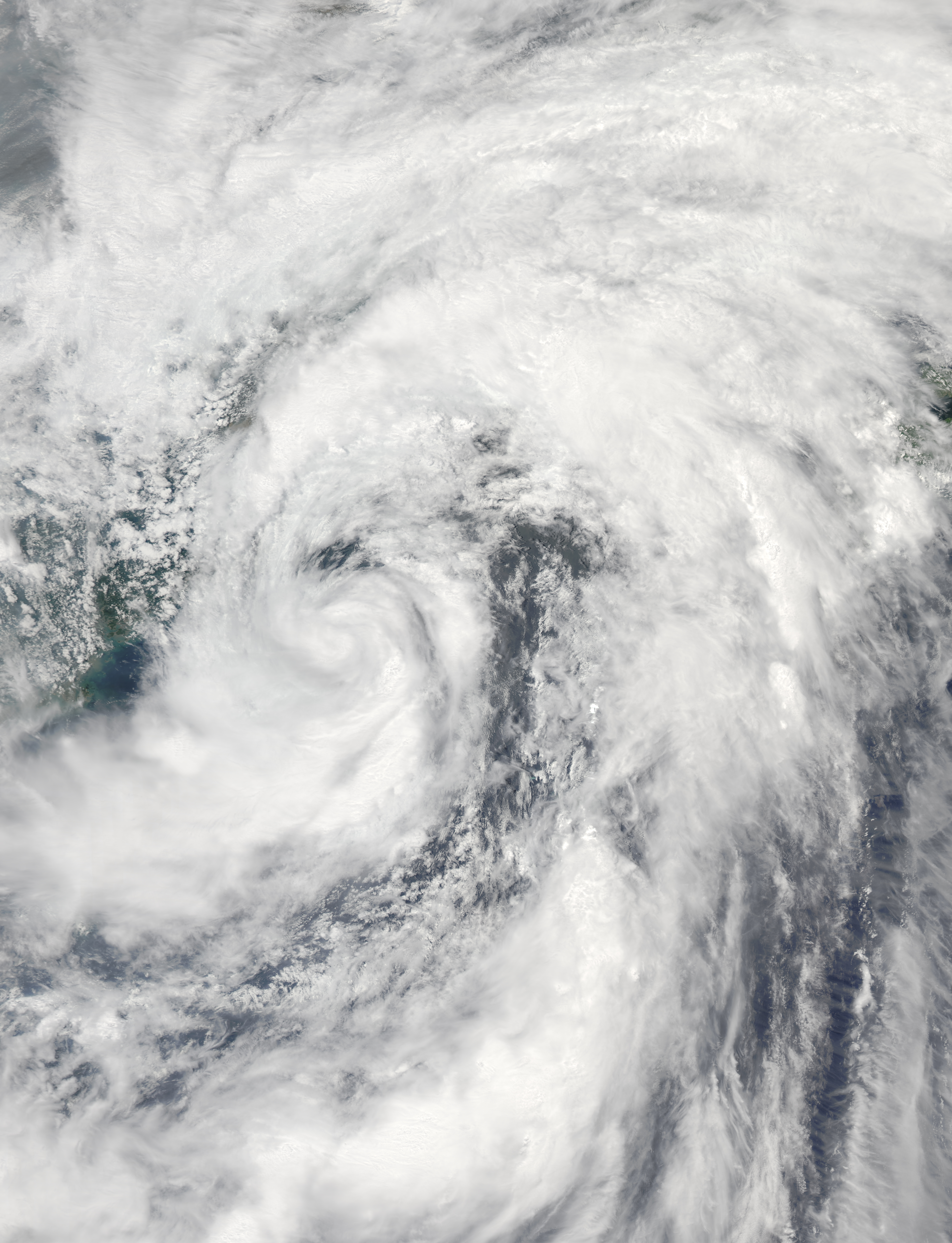
Tropical Storm Meari with its rainbands from the ITCZ

June 23
- Tropical Storm Haima makes landfall in Zhanjiang, Guandong, China.
- Tropical Storm Meari intensifies as it enters dry air and deep convection and became a Severe Tropical Storm the next day and enters Okinawa, Japan late on June 23.

June 25
- Tropical Storm Haima slowly dissipates over land as it moves southwest.

June 27
- Severe Tropical Storm Meari dissipates and made landfall in Korea killing 9.

=== July ===
July 7

July 9

- 1800 UTC - A tropical disturbance formed east of Aurora.
- 2300 UTC - It was upgraded to Tropical Depression Goring by the PAGASA as it brought rainfall towards eastern Philippines.

July 11

- 1800 UTC - A tropical disturbance rapidly intensified to a tropical depression on July 11 as it moves towards an area of warm waters.

July 12

- 0300 UTC - The depression was designated 08W.
- 0900 UTC - 08W rapidly becomes Tropical Storm Ma-on.

July 13

- 0600 UTC - A new tropical depression was located in the Philippine Sea and PAGASA naming it as Hanna.

July 14

- 0300 UTC - JTWC upgrades Hanna to Tropical Depression 14W and JMA was upgraded to Tropical Storm Tokage.
- 0900 UTC - Typhoon Ma-on rapidly becomes a Category 3 typhoon as it is expected to hit Japan.

July 15

- 1200 UTC - Tokage was absorbed by Typhoon Ma-on as it became a Category 4 typhoon from the fujiwhara effect.
- 2100 UTC - The JTWC made its final advisories on Tokage.

July 17
- Typhoon Ma-on enters the Philippine area of responsibility in a short matter of time as it is being named Ineng.

July 20
- Typhoon Ma-on steadily weakens as it made landfall in Wakayama.

July 23
- Tropical Storm Ma-on weakens to a tropical depression and dissipates the next day.
- Tropical Depression Juaning forms east of the Philippines as deep convection wrapped up Juaning and was designated 10W.

July 25
- Juaning was upgraded to Tropical Storm Nock-ten as it struck land in the Philippines.

July 27
- Nock-ten creates an unbalanced eye in a short time as it became a Severe Tropical Storm by the JMA but the JTWC upgraded it to a typhoon.
- Tropical Depression 11W forms west of Guam.

July 28
- 11W intensifies to Tropical Storm Muifa as it intensified and enters the PAR given the name Kabayan.
- Tropical Storm Nock-ten enters the South China Sea on July 28 and intensifies again to a strong Tropical Storm.

July 30
- Severe Tropical Storm Muifa rapidly becomes a minimal typhoon as it heads straight north affecting the Philippines by the southwest monsoon.
- Nock-ten impacts the south China cost as it dissipates the next day.
- A disturbance formed northwest of Manila from the southwest monsoon, which is being enhanced by Typhoon Muifa.

July 31
- Deep convection occurred as the disturbance became a tropical depression naming it Lando By the PAGASA.
- Typhoon Muifa started creating an eyewall as it began explosive intensification.

=== August ===
August 1

- 1800 UTC - Tropical Depression Lando slowly dissipates as it enhances the southwest monsoon.
- 2100 UTC - Typhoon Muifa steadily weakens as it still heads straight north towards Korea.

August 2

- 0300 UTC - Tropical Depression Lando dissipates and is absorbed by the southwest monsoon, bringing intense rainfall over northern Philippines.
- 0600 UTC - Tropical Depression 12W formed near the Wake Islands.
- 1200 UTC - Category 3 typhoon Muifa rapidly turns west as it weakens to a minimal typhoon.

August 4

- 1800 UTC - 12W rapidly intensified to Tropical Storm Merbok.
- 2100 UTC -Muifa entered land and destruct Shanghai on August 4 as it rapidly weakens to a Subtropical storm.

August 7

- 0000 UTC - The JMA classifies Merbok as a severe tropical storm.
- 1500 UTC - Merbok intensifies into a minimal typhoon by the JTWC.

August 8

- 0300 UTC - Mebok rapidly weakens over cool waters as it accelerates north on August 8, as an extratropical transition.
- 0600 UTC - Subtropical depression Mufia becomes extratropical as it dissipates on August 9.
- 0900 UTC - A tropical depression forms west of Guam.

August 10

- 0900 UT - JTWC designates it as 13W, as it absorbs few moisture and moves in a north northwest motion.

August 15

- 0300 UTC - Tropical Depression 13W failed to be a tropical storm as it dissipated to a remnant low in a subtropical ridge.

August 20

- 1500 UTC - A tropical low developed north of Palau as it developed a low-level circulation center.

August 22

- 0000 UTC - It developed into a depression, naming it Mina by the PAGASA.
- 0600 UTC - Tropical Depression Mina enters a place of favorable environments as the JTWC upgrades it as Tropical Depression 14W.

August 23

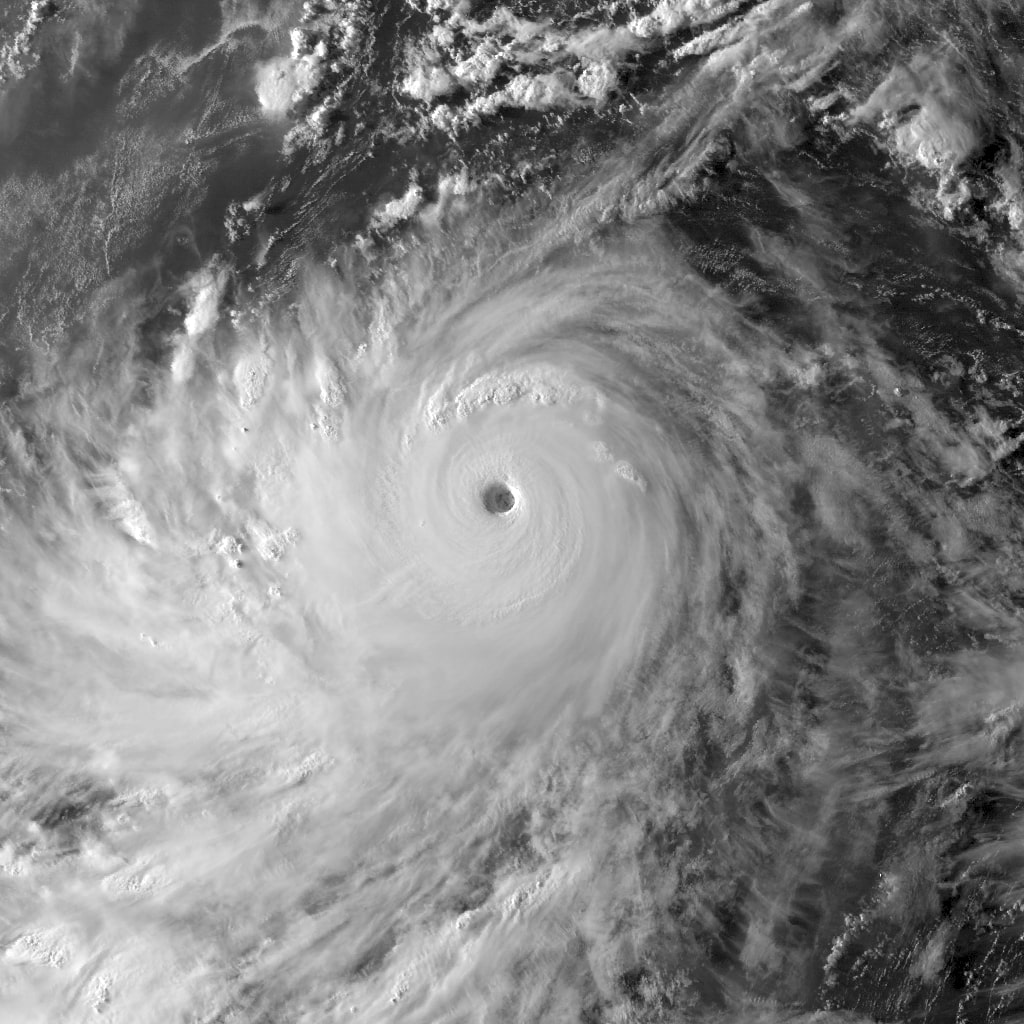
Super Typhoon Nanmadol on early on August 26

- 0300 UTC - Good outflow developed from Mina as it became Tropical Storm Nanmadol.
- 1500 UTC - The JTWC tracks a newly formed disturbance, west of Guam.

August 25

- 0000 UTC - The JMA and JTWC upgrades it as Tropical Depression 15W.

- Nanmadol rapidly becomes a typhoon as it approaches landfall late on August 25.

August 27

- 0300 UTC - The JMA upgrades 15W to Tropical Storm Talas as it creates a large eye.
- 0600 UTC - 5 were reported killed as Nanmadol (Mina) made landfall in Philippines.
- 2100 UTC - Tropical Storm Talas becomes a severe Tropical Storm as it accelerates north and maintains its strength. Some agencies predict that Talas will be a typhoon.

August 30
- Typhoon Nanmadol dissipates over China and Taiwan as it made its third landfall.
- Talas slowly weakens as it nearly enters cool waters.

=== September ===
September 1

- 0000 UTC - A disturbance formed from the outflow of Talas early on September 1, which was located several kilometers northeast of Guam.

September 3

- 1200 UTC - Talas enters Japan making landfall.
- 1800 UTC - The disturbance was upgraded to Tropical Depression 16W as it had enough vertical windshear and moisture.

September 4

- 0000 UTC - The JTWC reports that 16W had intensified into a weak tropical storm.
- 0600 UTC - It was then named as Tropical Storm Noru and moved towards the eastern outflow of Talas.
- 2100 UTC - Talas rapidly dissipates as its remnants becomes extratropical as it moved north of Japan.

September 6

- 0600 UTC - The remnants of Talas and Noru interacted together as an extratropical transition.
- 1200 UTC - The low-pressure area had intensified into a tropical depression as it gathers strength over the Philippine Sea.
- 2100 UTC - The JTWC now have its first advisories on the intensifying depression, designating as Tropical Depression 17W.

September 7

- 0900 UTC - Windshear caused 17W to undergo a rapid deepening phase, prior to that, the JMA named it as Kulap.

September 8

- 0600 UTC - Tropical Storm Kulap entered the PAR receiving the name Nonoy as a tropical storm.
- 1800 UTC - A cluster of thunderstorms formed together as a low pressure area with improving outflow and a developing low-level circulation center.

September 9
- Tropical Storm Kulap's circulation became exposed as it moves closer to southern and southwestern parts of Japan.
- The low pressure strengthened to Tropical Disturbance.

September 11
- Tropical Depression Kulap dissipates as it was absorbed by a weather front on mid-September 11.
- The Tropical Depression was designated 18W as deep convection wraps 18W. It also entered the Philippines area of responsibility naming it Onyok.

September 12

- 0300 UTC - A tropical depression formed northeast of the Northern Mariana Islands.
- 1800 UTC - The depression enters the PAR as PAGASA named it Onyok.

September 13

- 0000 UTC - The JTWC classifies Onyok into a tropical depression and designated it as 18W.
- 1500 UTC - The system intensifies into Tropical Storm Roke.

September 14
- 19W was designated by the JTWC as the tropical depression formed even further.
- Roke started strengthening as it moved west.

September 15
- Tropical Depression 19W turned into Tropical Storm Sonca as it moved west in a fast pace movement.

September 17
- Roke was intensified as a severe tropical storm as it developed a small deep convective eye.
- Sonca was also upgraded to a severe tropical storm.

September 18
- Severe Tropical Storm Sonca was upgraded to a Category 1 typhoon. It was then intensified to a Category 2 typhoon the next day.
- Roke became a typhoon as it made a small loop as it re-enters the Philippines' area of responsibility and moved northeastwards.

September 20

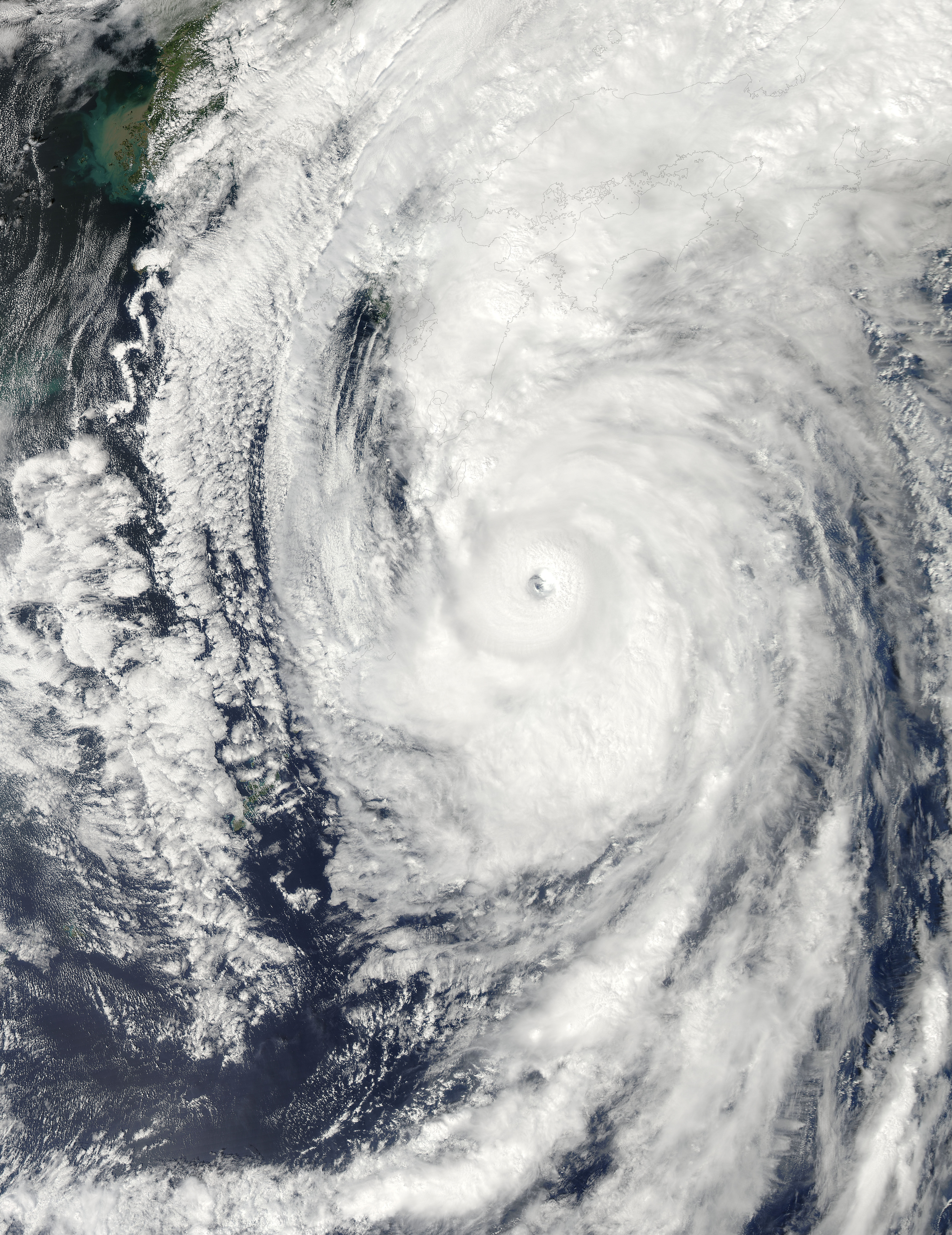
Typhoon Roke very shortly after its rapid deepening

- Typhoon Roke underwent rapid deepening and became a Category 4 typhoon.
- Sonca rapidly becomes extratropical and dissipates later that day.

September 22
- Typhoon Roke becomes extratropical as its remnants dissipates the next day.
- A disturbance forms southwest of Guam.

September 23
- It was upgraded to Tropical Depression 20W.
- An area of convection intensifies to a depression in the South China Sea.

September 24

- 1500 UTC - 20W was upgraded to a storm and named it Nesat.
  - - The PAGASA issues its first advisories on Tropical Storm Nesat, giving the codename Pedring.
- 2100 UTC - The depression was upgraded to 21W as convection forms around it and became Tropical Storm Haitang.

September 25

- 0300 UTC - A small weak disturbance formed over warm waters.
- 0900 UTC - Tropical Storm Haitang reaches its maximum intensity with an exposed circulation, but never reached severe tropical storm strength.
  - - The JMA classifies Nesat as a severe tropical storm, and the JTWC upgraded the system as a Category 1 typhoon an hour later.
- 1500 UTC - Severe Tropical Storm Nesat has rapidly intensified into Typhoon Nesat.

September 26

- 0900 UTC - Haitang rapidly weakens as it makes landfall over Vietnam.
- 1200 UTC - The JMA and JTWC classifies a new disturbance over the Pacific Ocean.
- 1800 UTC - It intensifies to Tropical Depression 22W by the JTWC.
- 2100 UTC - The JMA and JTWC downgrades Haitang to a tropical depression as the JTWC made its last advisories on the storm.
- 2330 UTC - Nesat reaches peak intensity approximately on that time.

September 27

- 0300 UTC - Typhoon Nesat makes landfall as it reacts to land and weakened to a very strong Category 1 typhoon.

September 28

- 1500 UTC - As of PAGASA, Typhoon Pedring leaves the PAR and stops issuing warnings as Nalgae nearly enters the PAR.
  - - Nalgae matures to a severe tropical storm by the JMA and a category 1 typhoon by JTWC.
- 1800 UTC - Severe Tropical Storm Nalgae enters the Philippines' Area of Responsibility, giving the name Quiel.

September 29

- 1500 UTC - Nalgae intensifies to a typhoon as it gathers more warm waters and rainfall.

September 30

- 1200 UTC - Both agencies made their final warnings on Nesat as it dissipated overland.

=== October ===
October 1

- 0000 UTC - The JMA stops issuing advisories on Nesat as it slowly weakens as an overland tropical low.
  - - Nalgae makes landfall over northern Philippines.
- 0300 UTC - Both the JMA and JTWC classified Nalgae as a moderate typhoon due to land reaction, just after making landfall.

October 2

- 1200 UTC - Nalgae moves slowly as it weakens to a severe tropical storm.
- 1500 UTC - The JTWC downgrades Nalgae to a tropical storm/

October 3

- 1800 UTC - The JMA downgrades Nalgae to a tropical storm.

October 5

- 0000 UTC - The JTWC made its final advisories on Nalgae as it affects Hainan Island.
- 1500 UTC - Same with the JTWC, the JMA issued a warning that Nalgae had already degenerated to an overland low.
- 1800 UTC - The remnants of Tropical Low Nalgae had already dissipated.

October 7

- 1500 UTC - JTWC sees a developing disturbance nearly 750 km (470 mi) south of Guam.

October 9

- 0300 UTC - The system gradually developed and slowly intensified over an area of convection.
- 0900 UTC - The JMA upgraded the system as a depression.
- 2100 UTC - The weak tropical depression intensifies into Tropical Depression 23W.

October 10

- 0000 UTC - 23W still intensifies as it rapidly enters the PAR and named it as Ramon.
- 1200 UTC - JMA reports that Ramon had strengthened into Tropical Storm Banyan.

October 11

- 0000 UTC - A rapid-moving disturbance strengthened to a tropical depression by the JMA over cooler waters in the South China Sea.
- 0600 UTC - The PAGASA upgrades Ramon to a weak tropical storm as it kills 6.

October 14

- 0000 UTC - The weak depression rapidly weakens as it affects southern China.
- 0900 UTC - Banyan still moves north as it weakens to a disturbance due to the Northeast Monsoon and cooler waters.]

=== November ===
November 5

- 2100 UTC - The JTWC starts to monitor that had developed about 64 km (40 mi) east-southeast of Ho Chi Minh City, Vietnam.

November 7

- 0600 UTC - The JTWC upgrades it to a tropical depression, giving the designation 24W.
- 0900 UTC - 24W was seen and issued some warnings by the JMA.
- 2100 UTC - Tropical Depression 24W reaches its maximum peak intensity.

November 8

- 1500 UTC - The JMA stops issuing advisories of 24W as vertical windshear caused the system to weaken.
- 2100 UTC - Same with the JMA, the JTWC stops issuing advisories on 24W.

November 9

- 0600 UTC - The remnants of 24W finally tears apart from a cold front on its northeast.

=== December ===
December 2

- 1800 UTC - A non-tropical system formed west of Visayas, Philippines as the PAGASA classified it as an LPA.
- 2100 UTC - The Low-Pressure Area moved out of the PAR and slowly intensified over enough warm waters.

December 3

- 1200 UTC - The JTWC issues a warning over the LPA as it intensified into a disturbance with low-moderate vertical windshear.
- 1800 UTC - JMA reports that it became a disturbance but not a depression, as the JTWC upgrades it Tropical Depression 25W.

December 5

- 0000 UTC - Windshear increased as 25W weakens without becoming a tropical storm by the JTWC.
- 0600 UTC - Due to not enough convection, the JTWC stops issuing advisories of Tropical Depression 25W, as it affects Vietnam bringing showers.

December 9

- 0600 UTC - Same as the early formations of Tropical Depression 25W, a low-pressure area formed within the PAR as of southeast of Manila, Philippines, with PAGASA predicting of naming it in the next few days.

December 10

- 0300 UTC - The LPA weakened as the JTWC cancelled a TCFA, due to cold air wrapping the system.
- 2100 UTC - The system exits the PAR, without becoming the next named system of PAGASA.

December 12

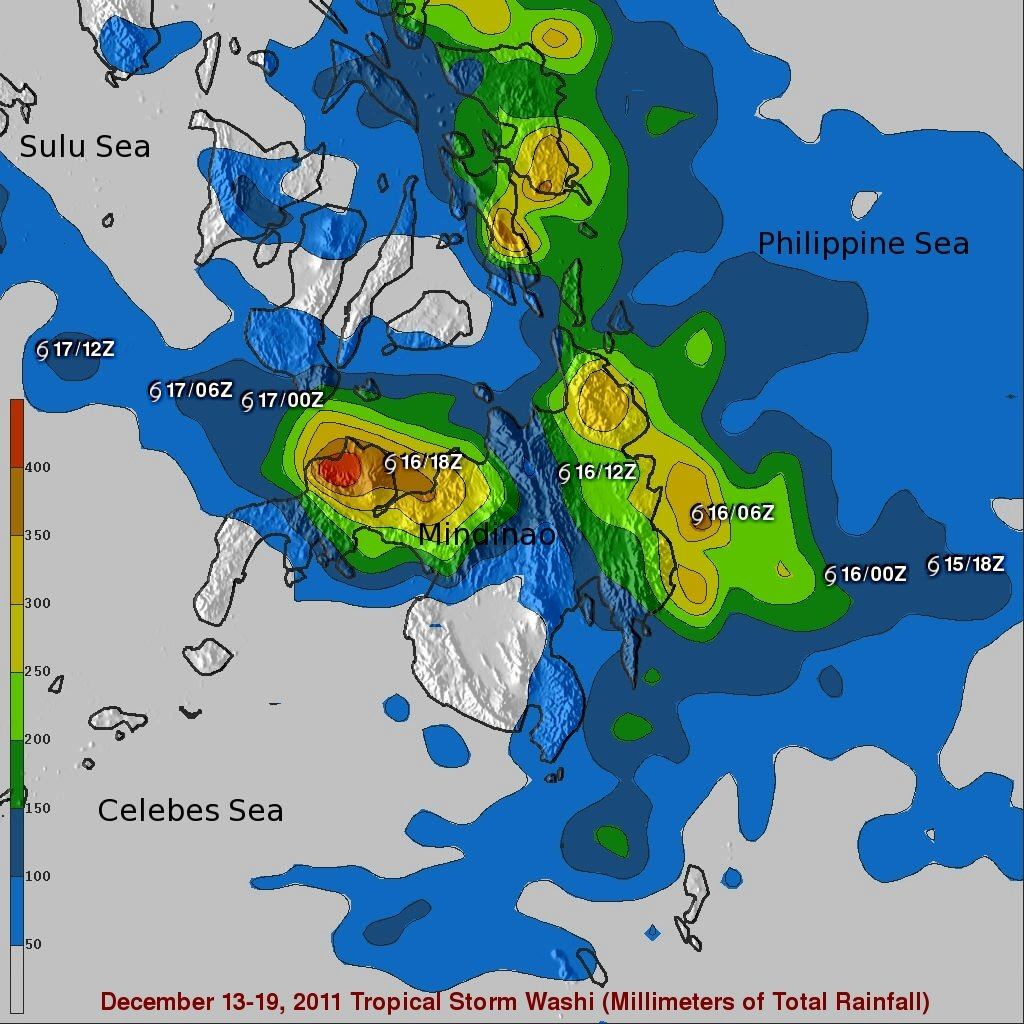
Estimated Rainfall over the Philippines from Tropical Storm Washi

- 0000 UTC - The JTWC again had the TCFA, as it rapidly upgrade it to Tropical Depression 26W.
- 0900 UTC - A tropical wave forms north of the equator in favorable conditions.

December 13

- 1200 UTC - The JMA upgraded it to a tropical depression s it gathers strength over warm waters.
- 1500 UTC - The depression becomes 27W by the JTWC.
- 2100 UTC - Tropical Depression 26W rapidly weakens, still at water and affecting southeast Asia.

December 14

- 0000 UTC - 26W's circulation became exposed as it dissipated over waters.
- 1200 UTC - The JTWC upgrades it to Tropical Storm 27W.

December 15

- 0300 UTC - PAGASA issues its first warning on tropical storm 27W, as it named it Sendong as a tropical storm too.
- 0900 UTC - JMA upgrades Sendong to a tropical storm too, with the latter naming it as Washi.

December 16

- 0900 UTC - Washi makes landfall over Surigao del Sur.
- 1200 UTC - Due to land reaction, it weakened but still a storm.

December 18

- 0000 UTC - Washi finishes affecting the Philippines as it moves away from the PAR.

December 19

- 1500 UTC - Washi weakens to a low-pressure area with a total of 1,200 fatalities over the Philippines.

December 30

- 2230 UTC - The last depression formed 340 km (210 mi) to the northeast of Kuala Lumpur, Malaysia.

December 31

- 1800 UTC - The system last noted by the JMA as the next season started.
- The 2011 Pacific typhoon season officially ends as the 2012 Pacific typhoon season officially begins.

== See also ==
- 2011 Pacific typhoon season
- 2011 Pacific hurricane season
- 2011 Atlantic hurricane season
- 2011 North Indian Ocean cyclone season
- South-West Indian Ocean cyclone seasons: 2010–11, 2011–12
- Australian region cyclone seasons: 2010–11, 2011–12
- South Pacific cyclone seasons: 2010–11, 2011–12
