= Tropical Storm Wutip (2025) =

Pacific severe tropical storm in 2025

Severe Tropical Storm Wutip
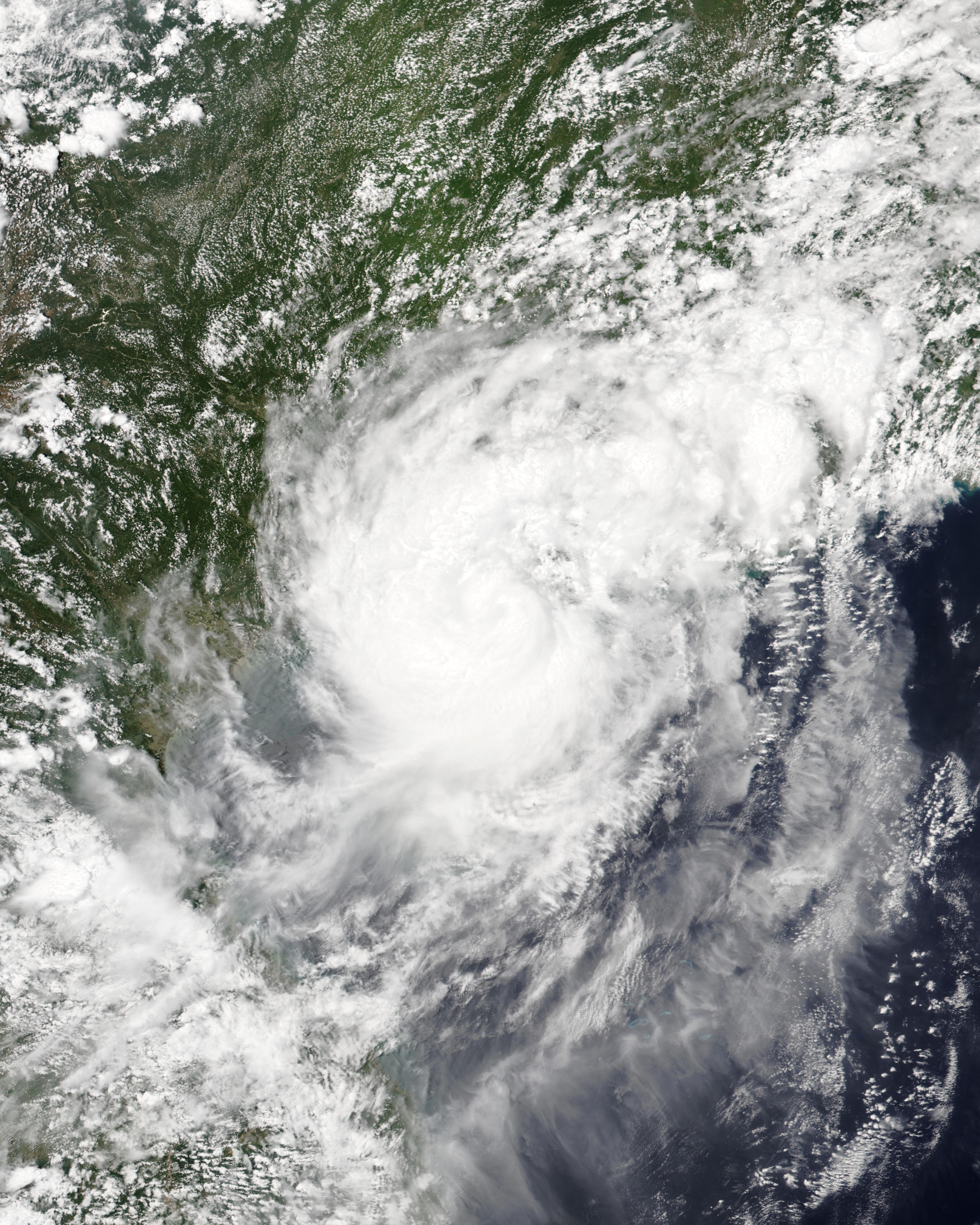
- Wutip making landfall over Leizhou Peninsula, China at its peak intensity on June 14

Meteorological history
- Formed: June 9, 2025
- Dissipated: June 15, 2025

Severe tropical storm
- 10-minute sustained (JMA)
- Highest winds: 110 km/h (70 mph)
- Lowest pressure: 980 hPa (mbar); 28.94 inHg

Category 1-equivalent typhoon
- 1-minute sustained (SSHWS/JTWC)
- Highest winds: 120 km/h (75 mph)
- Lowest pressure: 979 hPa (mbar); 28.91 inHg

Overall effects
- Fatalities: 21
- Injuries: 1
- Damage: $303 million (2025 USD)
- Areas affected: Philippines, Paracel Islands, South China (Hainan, Guangxi, Guangdong), Vietnam, Hong Kong, Macau
- IBTrACS
- Part of the 2025 Pacific typhoon season

Severe Tropical Storm Wutip (Note: The name Wutip (Cantonese: 蝴蝶, [wuː˨˩ tiːp̚˨]) was contributed by Macau and means butterfly in Cantonese.) was a tropical cyclone that impacted South China, Vietnam and the Philippines in early June 2025. The first named storm of the 2025 Pacific typhoon season, Wutip's origins can be traced back to June 5, when the Joint Typhoon Warning Center (JTWC) (Note: The Joint Typhoon Warning Center is a joint United States Navy – United States Air Force task force that issues tropical cyclone warnings for the western Pacific Ocean and other regions.) identified an area of atmospheric convection to the west of Yap in the Caroline Islands. After crossing Luzon, the system developed into a tropical depression over the South China Sea on June 9 as it moved west-northwestward along the southwestern periphery of a mid-level subtropical high. The Japan Meteorological Agency (JMA) (Note: The Japan Meteorological Agency is the official Regional Specialized Meteorological Centre for the western Pacific Ocean.) named the system Wutip on June 11 after it intensified into a tropical storm, making it one of the five latest-named storms in the northwestern Pacific basin. The following day, Wutip strengthened into a severe tropical storm and reached its peak on June 13, with ten-‌minute sustained winds of 110 km/h (70 mph) and a central pressure of 980 hPa (28.94 inHg). Wutip made its first landfall near Dongfang City before passing over the western part of Hainan Island on the same day, reemerging over the Gulf of Tonkin shortly afterwards. The JTWC reported that on June 14, Wutip had intensified into a minimal typhoon before making its second landfall near Leizhou, Guangdong, China. After landfall, it weakened into a minimal tropical storm. Once inland, the system further weakened into a tropical depression and continued to be tracked until it dissipated on June 15.

In the Philippines, the precursor to Wutip, along with the southwest monsoon, brought widespread rainfall and floods to parts of Luzon, as well as Central and Eastern Visayas, leading to teh damage of 790. In Đà Nẵng, Vietnam, the outer rainbands of the storm caused severe flooding on streets and in houses due to heavy rainfall, with some areas sustaining minimal damage. Power outages were also reported in parts of Vietnam; total damage in the country reached 1.32 trillion đồng (US$50.6 million). (Note: All currencies are in their 2025 values and are converted to United States dollars using data from Xe.com.) In the Chinese provinces of Hainan and Guangdong, Wutip brought strong winds with powerful gusts, leading to CN¥1.81 billion (US$252 million) damage in the country. The remnants of Wutip brought torrential rain in the Pearl River estuary. At least 21 people were reported dead, and one was injured.

== Meteorological history ==
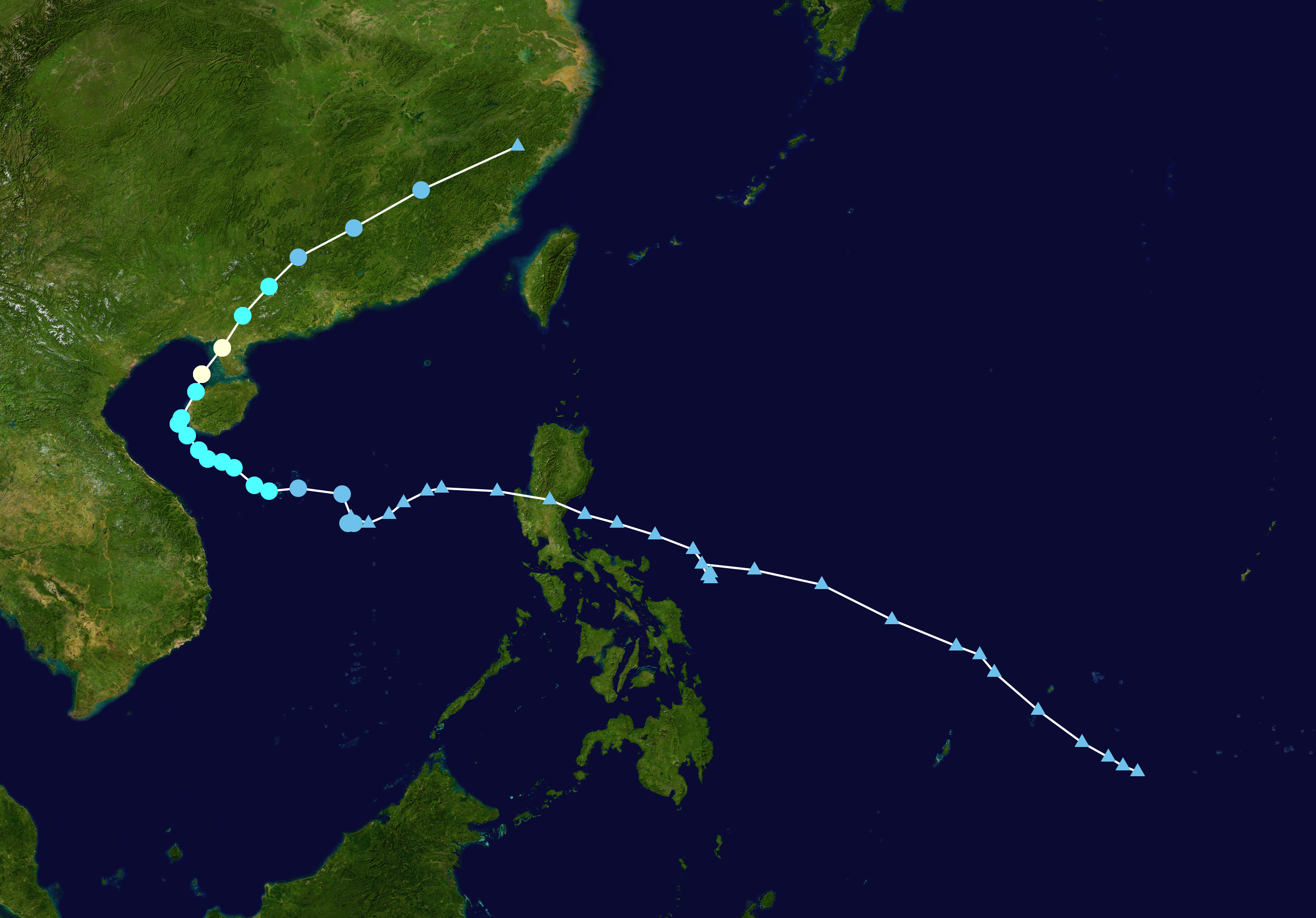
Map plotting the storm's track and intensity, according to the Saffir–Simpson scale Map key Saffir–Simpson scale Tropical depression (≤38 mph, ≤62 km/h) Tropical storm (39–73 mph, 63–118 km/h) Category 1 (74–95 mph, 119–153 km/h) Category 2 (96–110 mph, 154–177 km/h) Category 3 (111–129 mph, 178–208 km/h) Category 4 (130–156 mph, 209–251 km/h) Category 5 (≥157 mph, ≥252 km/h) Unknown Storm type Tropical cyclone Subtropical cyclone Extratropical cyclone, remnant low, tropical disturbance, or monsoon depression

The origins of Wutip date back to June 5, when the JTWC identified an area of atmospheric convection about 300 km (180 mi; 160 nmi) west of Yap, noting favorable conditions for tropical cyclogenesis. The following day, the JMA noted that the system had developed into a low-pressure area. After crossing Luzon, the JMA upgraded the system into a tropical depression over the South China Sea on June 9. By 06:00 UTC on June 10, the system was moving south of the Paracel Islands. Three hours later, the JTWC issued a Tropical Cyclone Formation Alert (TCFA) before upgrading it to a tropical depression, assigning it the designation 01W later that day, It moved west-northwest along the southwestern periphery of a mid-level subtropical high.

By June 11, the depression had intensified into a tropical storm and was named Wutip by the JMA. This marked the fifth latest first named storm in the western Pacific basin following Tropical Storm Nichole in 1998 (July 9), Typhoon Nepartak in 2016 (July 3), Severe Tropical Storm Wilda in 1973 (July 1), and Typhoon Sarah in 1983 (June 25). Initially, the JTWC held off on classifying the system as a tropical storm because satellite imagery showed a small, fully exposed low-level circulation center (LLCC), with only limited convection developing near the center. Conditions gradually improved, with warm sea surface temperatures supporting organization despite the system's limited structure. At 21:00 UTC on June 11, after deep convection consolidated over the LLCC, the JTWC upgraded the system to a tropical storm. By June 12, satellite imagery showed well-defined convective banding tightly wrapping around an obscured center.

At 18:00 UTC on June 12, the JMA classified Wutip as a severe tropical storm as persistent convection aligned more closely with the LLCC and cloud-top temperatures dropped to −82 °C (−116 °F). Moving westward along the southwestern edge of a mid-level subtropical high, Wutip maintained this structure until June 13, when spiral rainbands became increasingly organized around the center. At 03:00 UTC, the JMA assessed the storm at peak intensity with 10-minute sustained winds of 110 km/h (70 mph) and a central pressure of 980 hPa (28.94 inHg).

Microwave imagery revealed a developing eye feature, with convective bands wrapping around the storm's southern semicircle as it remained nearly stationary in the Gulf of Tonkin, west of Hainan, China. Approaching the subtropical ridge axis, Wutip curved northeastward and began accelerating. The storm briefly crossed the far western portion of Hainan Island, making its first landfall near Dongfang City at around 23:00 CST (15:00 UTC) on June 13 before reemerging over the Gulf of Tonkin shortly afterwards. On June 14, the JTWC reported that Wutip had rapidly intensified into a minimal typhoon, with one-minute sustained winds of 120 km/h (75 mph). Satellite imagery showed a compact, 27.8 km (17.3 mi; 15 nmi) eye surrounded by shallow to moderate convective activity, though deep convection had largely dissipated. Later that day, Wutip made a second landfall near Leizhou City in Guangdong Province at approximately 12:30 CST (04:30 UTC). After that, the storm weakened into a minimal tropical storm as its eye filled in, prompting the JTWC to issue its final advisory at 09:00 UTC. Once inland, the JMA downgraded Wutip to a tropical depression and continued tracking it until dissipation at 12:00 UTC on June 15.

== Preparations ==
=== Philippines ===
On June 7, the Philippine Atmospheric, Geophysical and Astronomical Services Administration (PAGASA) issued flood warnings for the weather disturbance that would later develop into Wutip, cautioning residents about potential landslides and flash floods. By June 10, the agency advised communities in affected areas to remain on alert for possible flooding.

=== Hainan and Southern China ===
On June 11, China's National Emergency Broadcast urged residents in coastal regions in coastal areas to stay updated on weather developments. The Hainan Provincial Disaster Prevention, Mitigation and Relief Committee activated an emergency response for Wutip. Meanwhile, the Ministry of Natural Resources forecast waves of 3–5 m (9.8–16.4 ft) along the coast of Hainan.

The Hainan Provincial Meteorological Bureau issued a yellow alert (Level III), while the cities of Wanning, Haikou, and the Baisha Li Autonomous County declared a blue alert. Fishing boats in Guangdong Province were ordered back to port before noon on June 11. By June 12, 139 flights were canceled at Haikou Meilan International Airport and all ferry services across the Qiongzhou Strait were suspended, leaving 1,200 trucks stranded near ports. A scheduled concert by Cantopop singer Eason Chan at the Wuyuan River Stadium in Haikou was also cancelled. Sixteen cities and counties across the province suspended classes and authorities evacuated 16,651 people from high-risk areas. Several tourist attractions temporarily closed due to the storm.

=== Macau, Hong Kong, and Taiwan ===
In Macau, the Meteorological and Geophysical Bureau (SMG) raised Standby Signal No. 1 at 06:00 MST on June 11 (22:00 UTC on June 10). The Strong Wind Signal No. 3 was hoisted later that day between 06:00 MST and 18:00 MST on June 12, prompting the suspension of primary school classes. The SMG again raised Signal No. 3 at 08:00 local time on June 14, before lowering all tropical cyclone signals on June 15 at 15:30 local time.

In Hong Kong, the Hong Kong Observatory (HKO) issued Standby Signal No. 1 at 16:40 UTC on June 10 (00:40 HKT on June 11) as Wutip was upgraded to a tropical depression within 800 km (500 mi) of the territory. Strong Wind Signal No. 3 followed at 12:20 local time on June 14 before being replaced by the Strong Monsoon Signal on June 15 at 15:40, which remained in effect until 21:00. On June 10, Taiwan's Central Weather Administration warned that thunderstorms were likely across southern parts of the island.

=== Indochina ===
The Ministry of Water Resources and Meteorology of Cambodia reported that the storm was expected to bring light rain to the country. In Laos, the Department of Meteorology and Hydrology warned that Wutip could produce moderate rainfall and potentially trigger landslides. The Thai Meteorological Department noted that Wutip noted that the storm would strengthen the regional monsoon, while Vietnam's National Centre for Hydro-Meteorological Forecasting (NCHMF) predicted strong winds and high waves across the northwestern South China Sea and the Paracel Islands. The agency also forecast heavy rainfall for much of the country. Authorities in Vietnam notified 18,570 workers on 6,331 fishing vessels about the storm's approach. Local governments were instructed to prepare emergency response measures, and the Search and Rescue and Civil Defense Department in Kon Tum Province urged its local units to closely monitor the storm's development.

== Impact ==
=== Philippines ===
The precursor to Wutip, along with the southwest monsoon, triggered a lahar flow near Kanlaon Volcano. Heavy rainfall was recorded in Bicol Region and Aurora Province, while Central and Eastern Visayas also experienced moderate precipitation. The system and the enhanced monsoon caused flooding in Mindoro, the provinces of Zambales and Bataan, as well as in San Jose del Monte, Bulacan, and around Roxas Boulevard. According to the National Disaster Risk Reduction and Management Council (NDRRMC), the combined effects of Wutip's precursor and the monsoon impacted 18,296 people. At least three fatalities were reported, along with one injury, damage to 790 homes, and power outages in two cities.

=== Vietnam ===
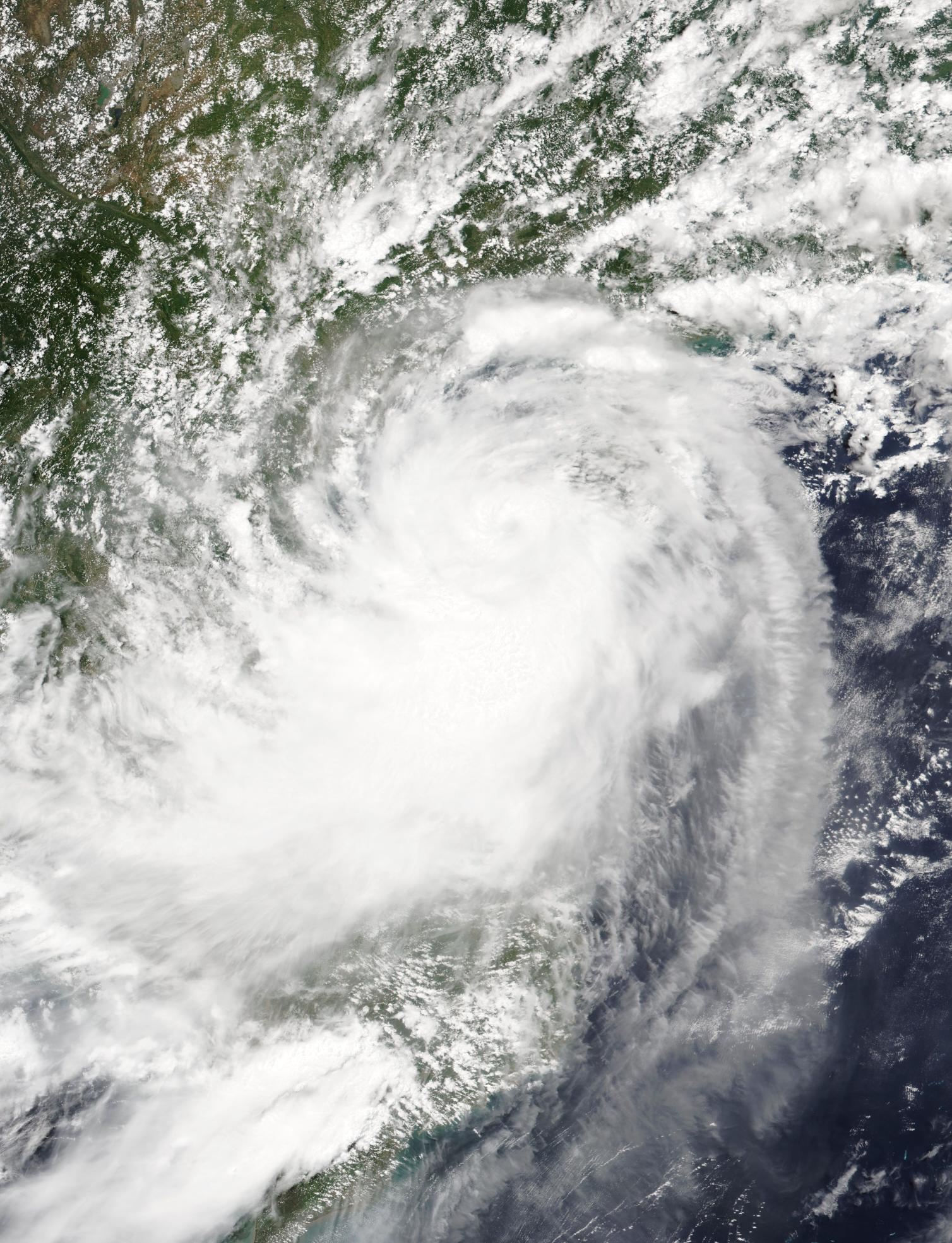
Wutip nearing Hainan on June 13

Wutip's heavy rains led to flooding in Huế, prompting local officials to advise residents to remain cautious. In Đà Nẵng, intense rainfall from the storm's outer bands inundated streets and homes, causing minor damage. Offshore, wave heights of 3–5 m (9.8–16.4 ft) threatened vessels, and on June 11, the Quảng Nam Border Guard Command rescued two fishermen stranded at sea. Landslides disrupted travel on the La Sơn–Túy Loan Expressway, Ho Chi Minh Highway, and National Highway 49. Flooding in the Hương River surpassed alert Level 2, while the Bồ River neared alert Level 3; floodwaters in the Quảng Trị province‌‌ also neared alert Level 2. Several low-lying bridges in Hoằng Hóa District, Thanh Hóa Province and Đakrông District, Quảng Trị Province were submerged. In total, 11 deaths were confirmed, including two people in Quảng Trị during flood prevention efforts and one drowning in Hải Lăng District.

Parts of Phú Xuân District, Huế saw flooding, while light rainfall reached the country's Central Highlands. In Mít Cát Village, Kim Thủy Commune, Lệ Thủy District‌, Quảng Bình Province, 52 residents from 10 households were evacuated due to high water levels. Across the country, more than 3,500 homes were flooded, including 2,770 in Quảng Trị, 725 in Quảng Nam, and 80 in Da Nang. Ten landslides blocked roads in Bảo Yên District, Lào Cai Province, and widespread power outages were reported. A fishing vessel sank off the coast, and flights at Da Nang International Airport were disrupted. At least 18,337 hectares (45,310 acres) of rice fields and nearly 1,000 hectares (2,500 acres) of other cropland were inundated. Water levels in several rivers reached their highest marks in 30 years. Total damage reached 1.32 trillion đồng (US$50.6 million).

=== China ===
In Hainan, Wutip brought damaging winds with gusts of 191–217 km/h (119–135 mph; 103–117 kn). Authorities evacuated 5,192 people from at-risk homes, 9,789 from construction sites, and 1,580 from low-lying flood-prone areas. Coastal waves reached 3.4–4.6 m (11–15 ft), damaging some fishing vessels. Twelve sailors were rescued after their cargo ship was battered by 3.0 m (10 ft) waves. Strong winds toppled 698 trees in Sanya, while 1,200 trucks were stranded near ports. After its second landfall, the storm brought rain and wind to Zhanjiang, Suixi County, and Leizhou in Guangdong Province, with speeds of 37–46 km/h (23–29 mph; 20–25 kn). A rain-induced landslide in Luchuan County, Guangxi, claimed three lives. Widespread flooding affected Huaiji County in Guangdong, displacing 70,000 people. Officials in Zhejiang Province issued emergency flood alerts, while parts of Rongjiang County were inundated, and a bridge on the Xiarong Expressway in Sandu County, Guizhou Province was washed away. In total, 7 people died in the country, and direct economic losses totaled at CN¥1.81 billion (US$252 million).

=== Macau and Hong Kong ===
The remnants of Wutip dumped heavy rain over the Pearl River estuary on June 17. Macau issued the amber and red rainstorm signals at 06:20 and 06:35 MST, respectively, prompting suspension of primary school classes and cancellation of morning classes for secondary schools. In Hong Kong, the thunderstorm warning and the Amber rainstorm signal were issued at 02:30 and 07:30 HKT, respectively.‌

== See also ==
- Weather of 2025
- Other storms of the same name
- Tropical cyclones in 2025
- Tropical Storm Ted (1995) – a storm of comparable intensity that had a very similar track
- Tropical Storm Durian (2001) – a deadly storm with a similar track occurring at about the same time of year
- Typhoon Nepartak (2003) – a strong typhoon that occurred much later in the year and had a very similar track
- Typhoon Wutip (2013) – another tropical cyclone with the same name that affected similar areas
- Tropical Storm Sanba (2023) – another tropical storm which caused damage in Vietnam and had a similar track
- Tropical Storm Trami (2024) – had a similar track but brought the worst flooding in Luzon
- Typhoon Kajiki (2025) – took a similar track to Wutip two months later
