= List of storms named Sarika =

The name Sarika (Khmer: សារិកា, [saːriʔkaː]) was used for three tropical cyclones in the West Pacific Ocean. The name, contributed by Cambodia, refers to the common hill myna (Gracula religiosa) in Khmer.

- Tropical Storm Sarika (2004) (T0419, 23W) – stayed out of the sea.
- Tropical Storm Sarika (2011) (T1103, 05W, Dodong) – affected the Philippines during early June.
- Typhoon Sarika (2016) (T1621, 24W, Karen) – rapidly intensified and made landfall in the Philippines as a category 4 typhoon in mid-October and struck Hainan afterwards.

The name Sarika was retired after the 2016 season and replaced with Trases (Khmer: ត្រសេះ, [trɑˈseh]), which means woodpecker in Khmer.
