= List of storms named Dodong =

The name Dodong has been used for six tropical cyclones in the Philippine Area of Responsibility by PAGASA in the Western Pacific Ocean.

- Severe Tropical Storm Nangka (2003) (T0305, 06W, Dodong) – approached Taiwan.
- Tropical Storm Wutip (2007) (T0707, 08W, Dodong) – approached Taiwan.
- Tropical Storm Sarika (2011) (T1103, 05W, Dodong) – struck China.
- Typhoon Noul (2015) (T1506, 06W, Dodong) – a Category 5 typhoon that affected the Philippines in May of 2015.
- Tropical Storm Sepat (2019) (T1903, Dodong) – affected Japan and was not recognized by the JTWC.
- Severe Tropical Storm Talim (2023) (T2304, 04W, Dodong) - A severe tropical storm that affected Philippines and Southern China.

Preceded by Chedeng	Philippine typhoon names Dodong	Succeeded by Emil
