= List of storms named Chedeng =

The name Chedeng has been used for five tropical cyclones in the Philippine Area of Responsibility by PAGASA in the Western Pacific Ocean.

- Severe Tropical Storm Linfa (2003) (T0304, 05W, Chedeng) – struck the Philippines and Japan
- Typhoon Pabuk (2007) (T0706, 07W, Chedeng) – struck Taiwan and China
- Typhoon Songda (2011) (T1102, 04W, Chedeng) – Category 5 super typhoon that brushed the Philippines and Japan
- Typhoon Maysak (2015) (T1504, 04W, Chedeng) – Category 5 super typhoon that made landfall on Luzon as a minimal tropical storm
- Tropical Depression Chedeng (2019) (03W, Chedeng) – made landfall on Palau and Mindanao
- Typhoon Guchol (2023) (T2303, 03W, Chedeng) – churned in the open ocean without affecting any landmasses.

Preceded by Betty	Pacific typhoon season names Chedeng	Succeeded by Dodong
