= Tropical Storm Pabuk (2024) =

Pacific tropical storm in 2024

Tropical Storm Pabuk (Romina)
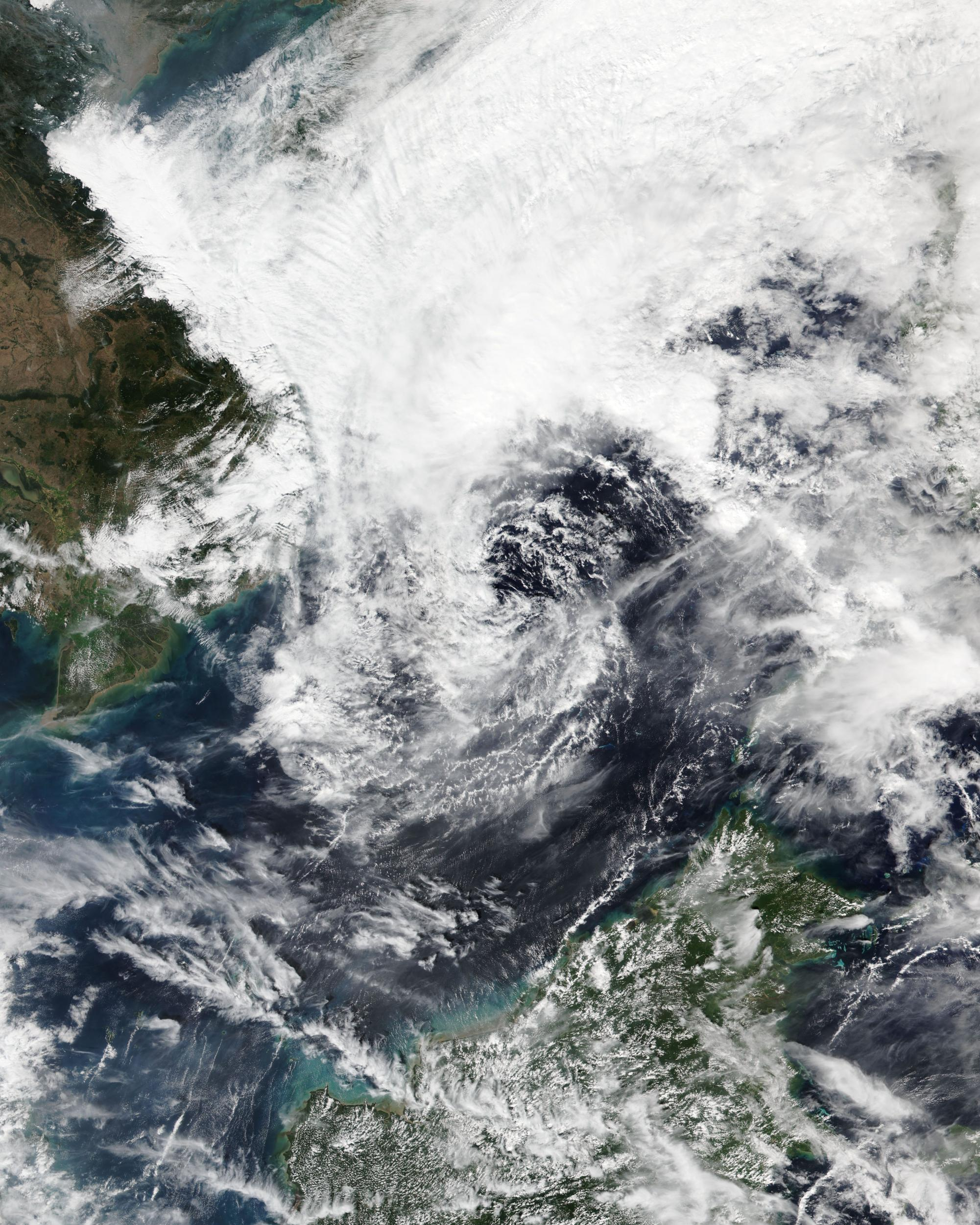
- Pabuk near peak intensity on December 23

Meteorological history
- Formed: December 21, 2024
- Dissipated: December 25, 2024

Tropical storm
- 10-minute sustained (JMA)
- Highest winds: 65 km/h (40 mph)
- Lowest pressure: 1000 hPa (mbar); 29.53 inHg

Tropical depression
- 1-minute sustained (SSHWS/JTWC)
- Highest winds: 55 km/h (35 mph)
- Lowest pressure: 1000 hPa (mbar); 29.53 inHg

Overall effects
- Fatalities: 4 total
- Damage: $9.91 million (2024 USD)
- Areas affected: East Malaysia, Philippines, Vietnam
- IBTrACS
- Part of the 2024 Pacific typhoon season

Tropical Storm Pabuk, (Note: The name Pabuk (Lao: ປາບຶກ, [paː˩ bɯk̚˧˥]) was contributed by Laos and refers to the Mekong giant catfish (Pangasianodon gigas) in Lao.) known in the Philippines as Tropical Depression Romina, was a weak late-season tropical cyclone that affected the western Philippines, particularly Palawan and Oriental Mindoro, in late December 2024. The twenty-sixth and final named storm of the 2024 Pacific typhoon season, Pabuk originated from a low-pressure area that formed around west-southwest of Brunei on December 20.

As the system became better organized and developed curved rainbands, it intensified into a tropical depression. On December 22, due to its imminent threat to the Kalayaan Islands, the Philippine Atmospheric, Geophysical and Astronomical Services Administration (PAGASA) assigned it the name Romina, even though it was still outside the Philippine Area of Responsibility (PAR), marking the first time since 1963 that the agency named a tropical system beyond the area. PAGASA issued its final advisory the following day as the system moved away from the country; the Japan Meteorological Agency (JMA) later upgraded it to a tropical storm and assigned the international name Pabuk.

Tropical Cyclone Wind Signal No. 1 was raised over the Kalayaan Islands and Balabac, Palawan on December 22, but all warnings were lifted the next day. Minor government alerts were also issued in Malaysia and China. The storm brought heavy rainfall that affected about 36,900 people, mainly in Palawan and Oriental Mindoro, forcing 12,200 families and 799 individuals to seek shelter in eight evacuation centers. In total, Pabuk caused four fatalities and destroyed 20 houses.

== Meteorological history ==
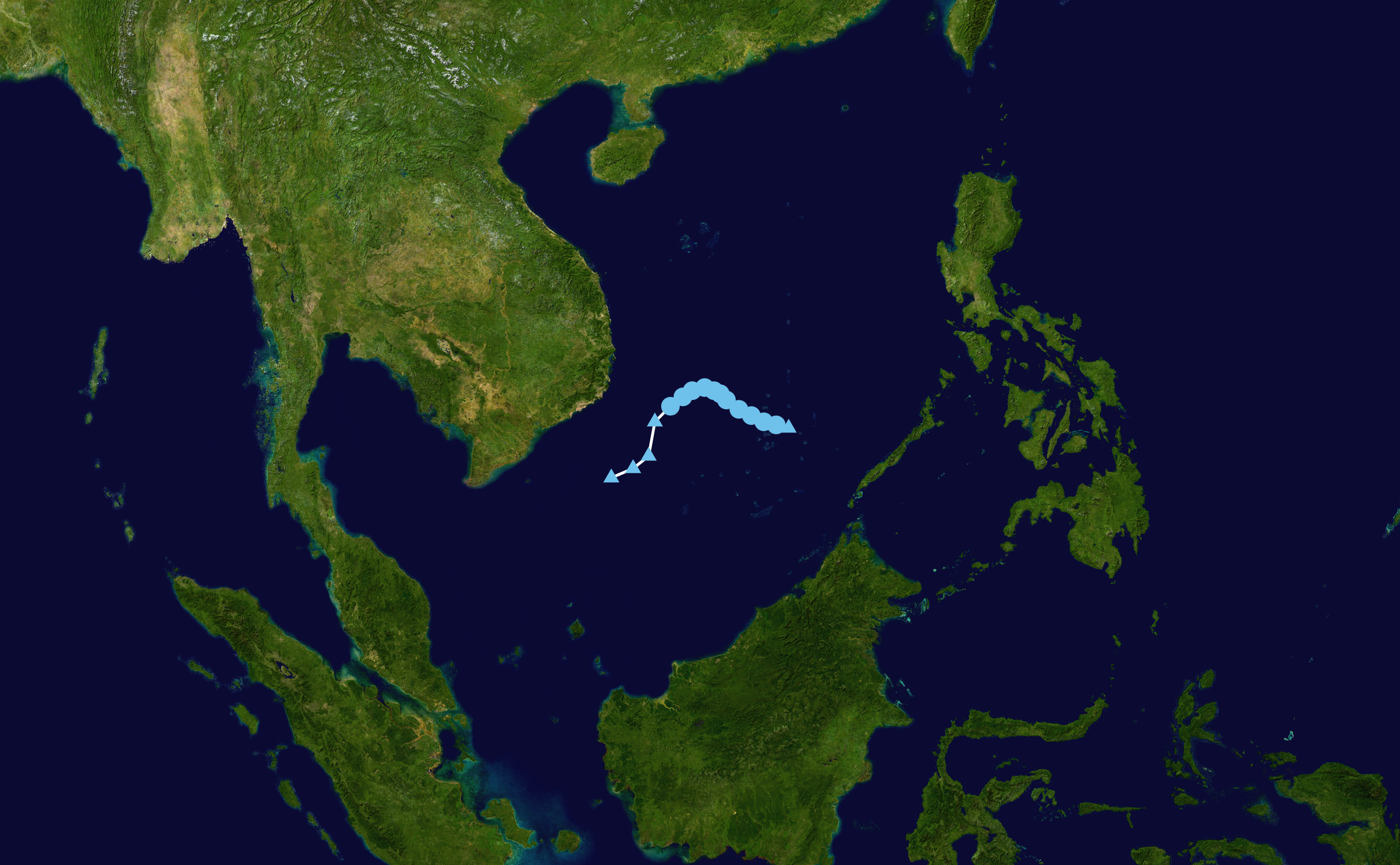
Map plotting the storm's track and intensity, according to the Saffir–Simpson scale Map key Saffir–Simpson scale Tropical depression (≤38 mph, ≤62 km/h) Tropical storm (39–73 mph, 63–118 km/h) Category 1 (74–95 mph, 119–153 km/h) Category 2 (96–110 mph, 154–177 km/h) Category 3 (111–129 mph, 178–208 km/h) Category 4 (130–156 mph, 209–251 km/h) Category 5 (≥157 mph, ≥252 km/h) Unknown Storm type Tropical cyclone Subtropical cyclone Extratropical cyclone, remnant low, tropical disturbance, or monsoon depression

The origins of Pabuk can be traced to December 20, when the Japan Meteorological Agency (JMA) reported a low-pressure area located about 460 km (290 mi) west-southwest of Brunei. The disturbance was later upgraded to a tropical depression. At 06:00 UTC on the following day, the United States Joint Typhoon Warning Center (JTWC) issued a Tropical Cyclone Formation Alert, noting that formative banding was organizing around the circulation and that deep convection was building over the center. Due to its impending threat to the Kalayaan Islands, PAGASA named the depression Romina at 11:00 PHT (03:00 UTC) on December 22, even though it remained outside the PAR, and began issuing advisories on the system. This marked the first time since 1963 that the state weather bureau of the Philippines named a tropical cyclone outside the PAR. (Note: Since 1963, the Philippines, through its official weather agency (the Philippine Weather Bureau before December 1972, and the PAGASA from that point), has independently maintained its own naming scheme for tropical cyclones that develop within its self-defined Philippine Area of Responsibility.)

Satellite loop of Pabuk approaching Vietnam on December 23

Later that same day, the JTWC designated the system as 28W, noting that a strong northeast surge was occurring, with winds shifting from north-northeasterly to northerly. Meanwhile, Invest 98W, which had developed near the system, rapidly weakened and was absorbed into the storm's southeastern periphery. At 21:00 UTC, Pabuk exhibited deep convection flaring on the northwestern side of a low-level circulation that remained mostly exposed. On December 23, PAGASA issued its final advisory on Romina as the system moved away from the Kalayaan Islands and lifted all wind signals. At 03:00 UTC, the JTWC assessed the system’s intensity with high confidence and noted that a ridge was steering it west-northwestward, while a cold surge enhanced its development. At 06:00 UTC, the JMA upgraded the depression to a tropical storm and named it Pabuk, citing a favorable environment as it moved westward along the southern periphery of a mid-level subtropical high. At 09:00 UTC, the JTWC described the storm as having a completely exposed low-level circulation center, noting that the presence of dry air contributed to the unfavorable environment. On December 24, the JTWC reported that the storm was situated in a marginally favorable environment that could deteriorate rapidly. By 06:00 UTC on December 25, Pabuk weakened to tropical depression status as unfavorable conditions disrupted its structure, prompting the JMA to issue its final prognostic reasoning.

== Preparations ==
On December 22, the Kalayaan Islands were placed under Tropical Cyclone Wind Signal No. 1 by PAGASA, where winds of 39 km/h (24 mph) to 61 km/h (38 mph) were expected. That same day, the municipality of Balabac, Palawan was also included under Signal No. 1, but the warning was lifted shortly after. On December 23, all signals were canceled as Pabuk moved away from the Philippines. Press briefings were held regarding the storm, while false rumors circulated online claiming that Pabuk would make landfall in Thailand on December 20, which authorities dismissed as untrue.

On December 24, the Malaysian Meteorological Department (MET) issued an advisory for Pabuk, warning of rough seas across the South China Sea. In China, a blue alert—the lowest level in the country’s tropical cyclone warning system—was issued for the Paracel Islands, Macclesfield Bank, and the Spratly Islands.

== Impact and response ==
Pabuk interacted with a shear line and brought heavy rains to the southern Philippines. The rainfall affected about 36,900 people, mostly in Palawan and Oriental Mindoro, and displaced 799 individuals who took shelter in eight evacuation centers. A total of 12,200 families were affected. In Baco, Oriental Mindoro, local authorities declared a state of calamity due to severe flooding, which displaced about 4,300 families or 20,000 people. According to the National Disaster Risk Reduction and Management Council (NDRRMC), four people were killed, all in Palawan, while 20 houses were damaged, two of which were completely destroyed. Total damage in the Philippines reached ₱581 million (US$9.91 million). The Department of Social Welfare and Development (DSWD) released ₱3.56 million (US$61,000) in humanitarian aid to those affected by the storm. The NDRRMC also provided assistance to affected communities.

In Vietnam, heavy rainfall was recorded across the South Central Coast and Central Highlands on December 23.

== See also ==
- Weather of 2024
- Tropical cyclones in 2024
- Other storms named Pabuk
- Timeline of the 2024 Pacific typhoon season
