= List of storms named Wutip =

The name Wutip (Cantonese: 蝴蝶, [wuː˨˩ tiːp̚˨]) has been used for five tropical cyclones in the western North Pacific Ocean. The name was contributed by Macau and means "butterfly" in Cantonese.

- Typhoon Wutip (2001) (T0112, 16W) – a Category 4 super typhoon that remained in the open ocean.
- Tropical Storm Wutip (2007) (T0707, 08W, Dodong) – affected the Philippines and Taiwan.
- Typhoon Wutip (2013) (T1321, 20W, Paolo) – a Category 3 typhoon that made landfall in Vietnam.
- Typhoon Wutip (2019) (T1902, 02W, Betty) – a Category 5 super typhoon that minimally affected the Caroline Islands and the Mariana Islands, becoming the strongest typhoon to occur in February.
- Severe Tropical Storm Wutip (2025) (T2501, 01W) – strong tropical storm that struck South China.

Preceded by Pabuk	Pacific typhoon season names Wutip	Succeeded by Sepat
