= Typhoon Pabuk (2001) =

Pacific typhoon in 2001

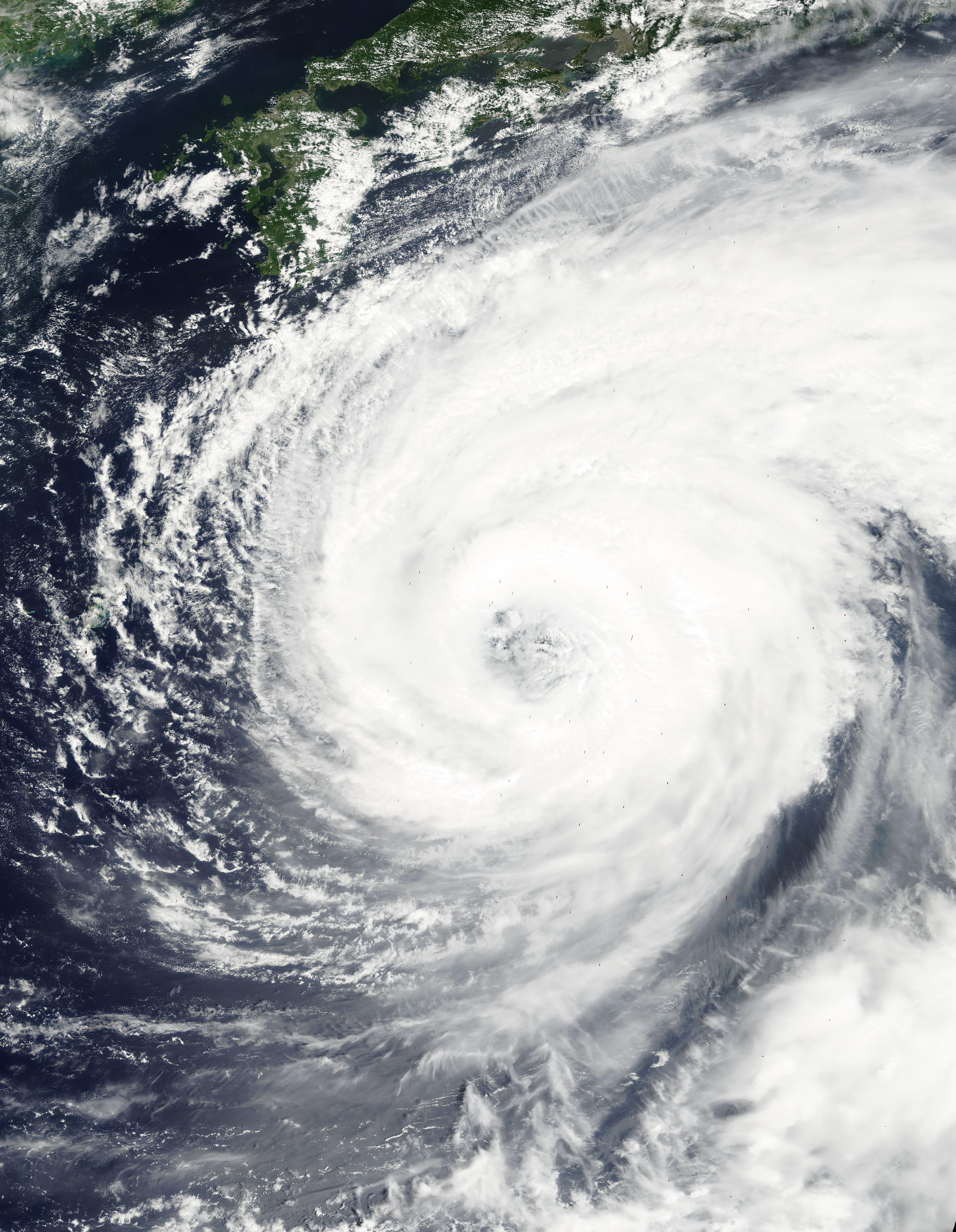
- Typhoon Pabuk at its peak intensity on August 19, 2001.

Meteorological history
- Formed: August 13, 2001
- Extratropical: August 22, 2001
- Dissipated: August 22, 2001

Typhoon
- 10-minute sustained (JMA)
- Highest winds: 130 km/h (80 mph)
- Lowest pressure: 960 hPa (mbar); 28.35 inHg

Category 2-equivalent typhoon
- 1-minute sustained (SSHWS/JTWC)
- Highest winds: 165 km/h (105 mph)
- Lowest pressure: 954 hPa (mbar); 28.17 inHg

Overall effects
- Fatalities: 8 total
- Damage: $421 million (2001 USD)
- Areas affected: Japan
- IBTrACS
- Part of the 2001 Pacific typhoon season

Typhoon Pabuk (Note: The name Pabuk (Lao: ປາບຶກ, [paː˩ bɯk̚˧˥]) was contributed by Laos and refers to the Mekong giant catfish (Pangasianodon gigas) in Lao.) was a high-end Category 2 typhoon that struck Japan in mid-August 2001. As the tenth named storm and the fifth typhoon of the 2001 Pacific typhoon season, it originated from a tropical depression to the north-northwest of Saipan. It began to develop rapidly, so the Joint Typhoon Warning Center issued a Tropical Cyclone Formation Alert. The same agency began to issue advisories on the system; thereafter, the depression was designated 14W. Every agency upgraded the depression to a tropical storm, gaining the name Pabuk from the Japan Meteorological Agency. Pabuk gradually intensified as it moved northwestward, getting upgraded to a typhoon by the JTWC on August 15, with the JMA following suit not too long after. By August 17, Pabuk briefly reached its initial peak strength as a low-end Category 2 typhoon before slowly weakening. The following day, Pabuk began to re-intensify. Pabuk also began to form an eye. By August 19, Pabuk reached its second peak intensity with 1-minute sustained winds of 165 km/h (105 mph). Pabuk grew in size, and its eye became irregular, hinting on a weakening trend while moving north northeastward. Pabuk weakened to tropical storm intensity when it hit the southern coast of Japan, south of Osaka, on August 21. On August 22, both the JMA and the JTWC issued their final advisories after Pabuk became extratropical. Pabuk brought heavy rain to Japan and damaged fields. Pabuk caused 8 fatalities and caused $421 million (2001 USD) in damages. (Note: All damage totals are in 2001 values of their respective currencies.)

== Meteorological history ==
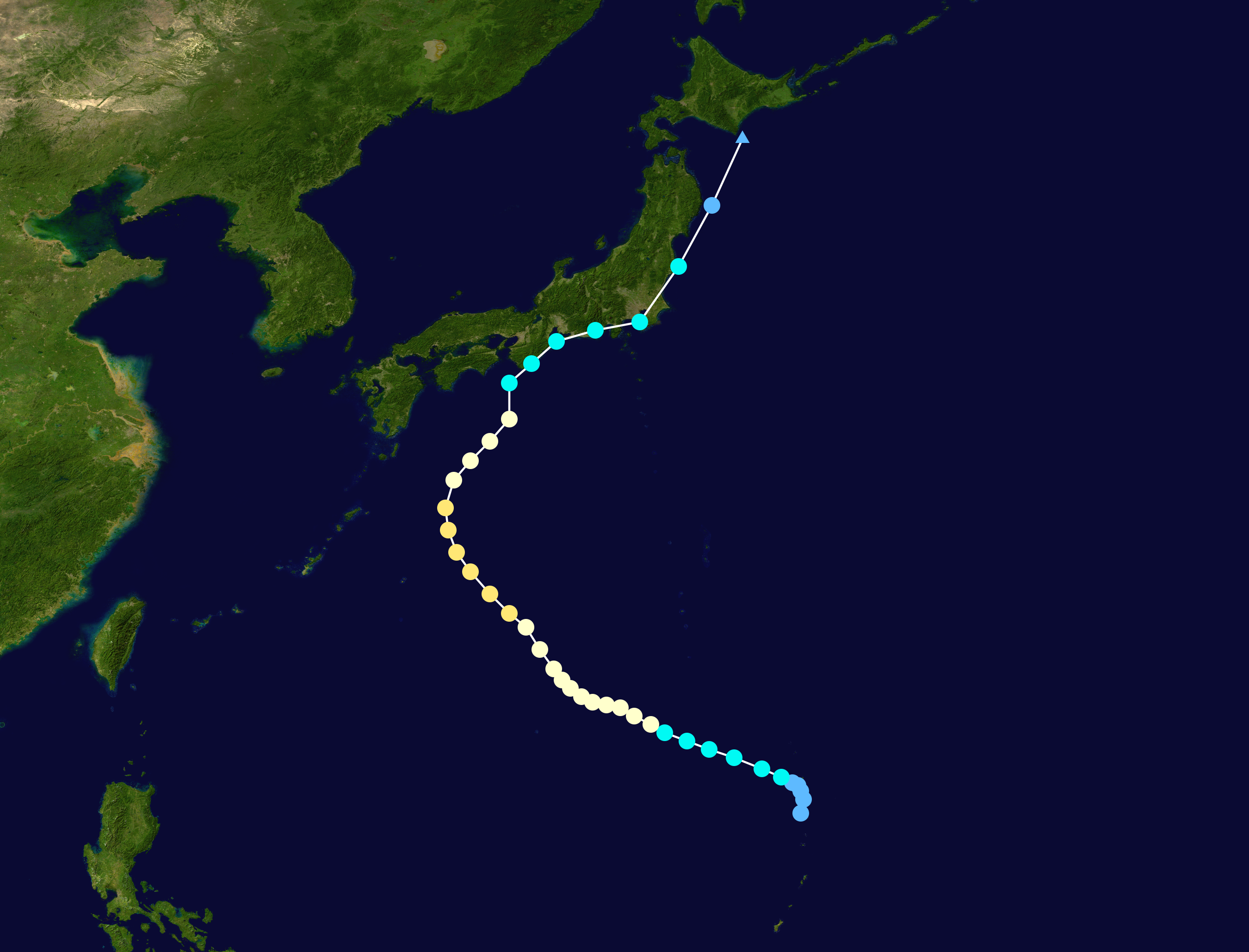
Map plotting the storm's track and intensity, according to the Saffir–Simpson scale Map key Saffir–Simpson scale Tropical depression (≤38 mph, ≤62 km/h) Tropical storm (39–73 mph, 63–118 km/h) Category 1 (74–95 mph, 119–153 km/h) Category 2 (96–110 mph, 154–177 km/h) Category 3 (111–129 mph, 178–208 km/h) Category 4 (130–156 mph, 209–251 km/h) Category 5 (≥157 mph, ≥252 km/h) Unknown Storm type Tropical cyclone Subtropical cyclone Extratropical cyclone, remnant low, tropical disturbance, or monsoon depression

On August 13, the Japan Meteorological Agency started to track a tropical depression that was embedded to the monsoon to the north-northwest of Saipan. Due to its rapid development, the Joint Typhoon Warning Center issued a Tropical Cyclone Formation Alert. The JTWC began issuing advisories; thereafter, giving the designation of 14W. All agencies upgraded 14W to a tropical storm the next day, after satellite imagery depicted a well-defined Low-level Circulation Center along with gale-force winds to the south of it. The JMA gave the storm the name Pabuk. Moving northwestward, Pabuk gradually intensified, and the JTWC upgraded the system to a typhoon on August 15; the JMA did the same 24 hours later. By August 17, Pabuk briefly reached its initial peak strength as a low-end Category 2 typhoon as it moved west-northwest before slowly weakening. During the next day, Pabuk began to re-intensify as a banding eye feature began to develop. Satellite animated imagery showed an eyewall forming with deep convection. By 06:00 UTC of August 19, Pabuk reached its second peak intensity with 1-minute sustained winds of 165 km/h (105 mph). The typhoon grew in size, and its eye became irregular, hinting on a weakening trend while moving north northeastward. Pabuk weakened to tropical storm intensity when it hit the southern coast of Japan, south of Osaka, on 12:00 UTC of August 21. On August 22, both the JMA and the JTWC issued its final advisory after it became extratropical.

== Preparations and impact ==
Pabuk brought heavy rainfall in the southern part of Honshu, which flooded many homes and disrupting sea and air travel. As the typhoon was approaching, the JMA warned on heavy winds and strong gusts along the southwestern and western coastline of Japan. Heavy rainfall was forecast throughout most of the nation to as far south as Okinawa, with the Kii Peninsula being forecast to have rainfall of about 300 mm (12 in). Around 70 homes were flooded in the island of Amami Ōshima alone. Moreover, the launch of the next-generation rocket H-IIA was also halted due to stormy conditions. Throughout Japan, the storm resulted in eight fatalities and 141 injured people. 917 hectares of fields were damaged. Multiple types of transportation were cancelled. Total damages from the typhoon amounted to ¥51.2 billion (US$421 million).

== See also ==
- Other tropical cyclones named Pabuk
- Typhoon Lorna (1954) – a strong Category 3 typhoon that severely impacted some areas of Honshu Island, especially Yokohama and Tokyo while also causing damages across the Northern Mariana Islands.
- Tropical Storm Louise (1967) – took a comparable trajectory.
- Typhoon Melor (2009) – took a nearly identical track.
- Typhoon Phanfone (2014) – a powerful tropical cyclone which affected Japan in early October 2014.
- Typhoon Vongfong (2014) – the most intense tropical cyclone worldwide in 2014 and struck Japan as a large tropical system.
