= List of storms named Pabuk =

The name Pabuk (Lao: ປາບຶກ, [paː˩ bɯk̚˧˥]) has been used for five tropical cyclones in the western North Pacific Ocean. The name was contributed by Laos and refers to the Mekong giant catfish (Pangasianodon gigas) in Lao.

- Typhoon Pabuk (2001) (T0111, 14W) – struck Japan.
- Typhoon Pabuk (2007) (T0706, 07W, Chedeng) – struck Taiwan and China.
- Severe Tropical Storm Pabuk (2013) (T1320, 19W) – churned in the ocean.
- Tropical Storm Pabuk (2019) (T1901, 36W) – struck the Malay Peninsula.
- Tropical Storm Pabuk (2024) (T2426, 28W, Romina) – formed near Brunei and Malaysia.

Preceded by Hebi	Pacific typhoon season names Pabuk	Succeeded by Wutip
