= List of storms named Sepat =

The name Sepat (Malay: sepat, [sə.pat]) has been used for five tropical cyclones in the western North Pacific Ocean. The name was contributed by Malaysia and means gourami in Malay.

- Tropical Storm Sepat (2001) (T0113, 17W) – Never affected land.
- Typhoon Sepat (2007) (T0708, 09W, Egay) – Strongest storm of the annual typhoon season; causing severe damages mostly in China.
- Tropical Storm Sepat (2013) (T1322, 21W) – passed almost close to Japan.
- Tropical Storm Sepat (2019) (T1903, Dodong) – was not recognised by the JTWC.
- Tropical Storm Sepat (2025) (T2502, 02W) – Nearly passed Japan as a weakening tropical depression.

Preceded by Wutip	Pacific typhoon season names Sepat	Succeeded by Mun
