= Middle atmosphere =

Middle atmosphere is a collective term sometimes used to refer to various layers of the atmosphere of the Earth and corresponding regions of the atmospheres of other planets, and includes:

- The stratosphere, which on Earth lies between the altitudes of about 12 kilometres (7.5 mi) and 50 kilometres (31 mi), sometimes considered part of the "lower atmosphere" rather than the middle atmosphere
- The mesosphere, which on Earth lies between the altitudes of about 50 and 80 kilometres (31 and 50 mi), sometimes considered part of the "upper atmosphere" rather than the middle atmosphere
