= Tropical Storm Sarika (2011) =

Pacific tropical storm in 2011

Tropical Storm Sarika (Dodong)
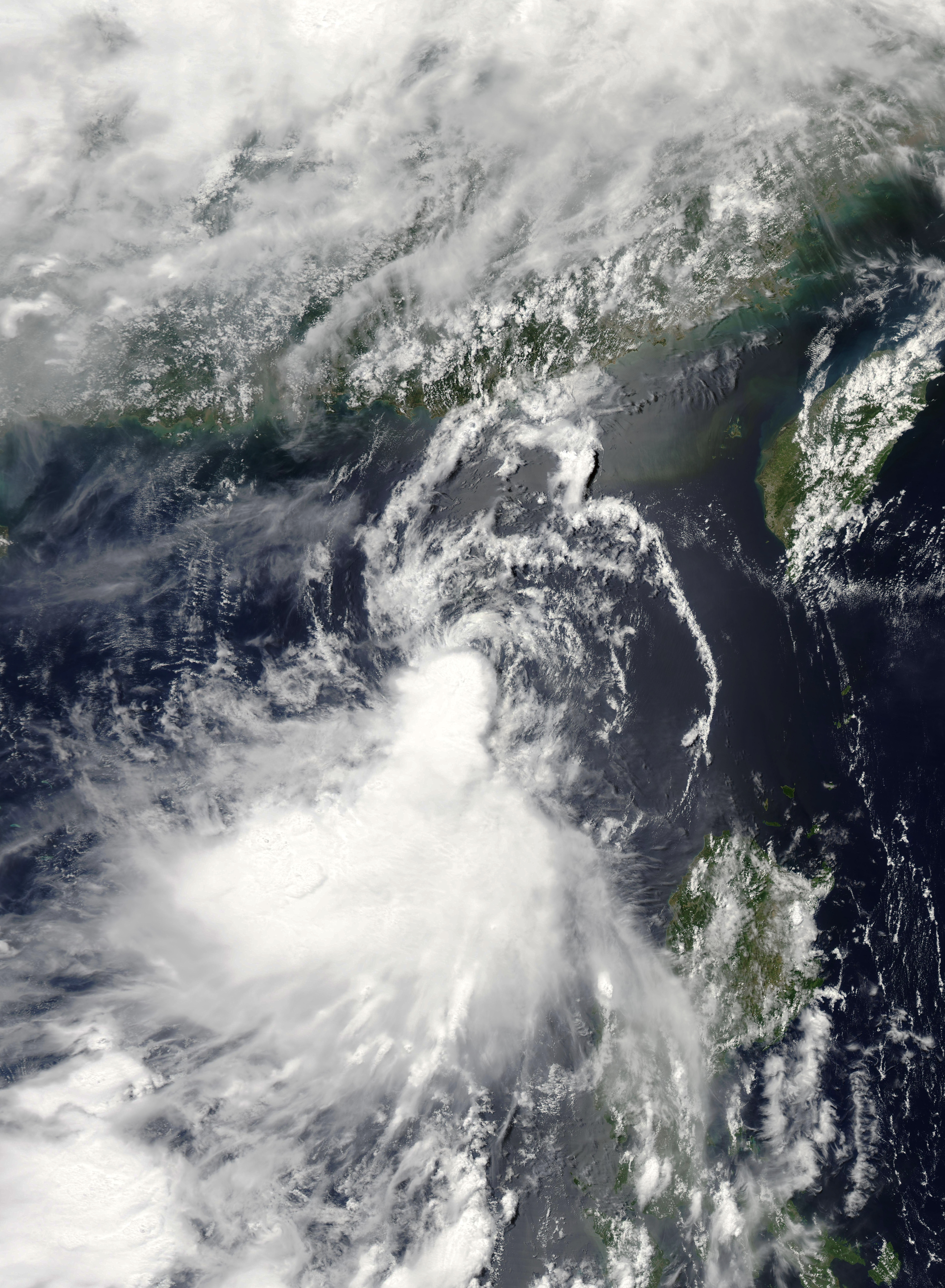
- Tropical Storm Sarika, with a sheared convection on June 10

Meteorological history
- Formed: June 8, 2011
- Dissipated: June 11, 2011

Tropical storm
- 10-minute sustained (JMA)
- Highest winds: 75 km/h (45 mph)
- Lowest pressure: 996 hPa (mbar); 29.41 inHg

Tropical depression
- 1-minute sustained (SSHWS/JTWC)
- Highest winds: 55 km/h (35 mph)
- Lowest pressure: 1000 hPa (mbar); 29.53 inHg

Overall effects
- Fatalities: 26
- Missing: 13
- Damage: $248 million (2011 USD)
- Areas affected: Philippines, East China, Taiwan
- IBTrACS
- Part of the 2011 Pacific typhoon season

Tropical Storm Sarika, known in the Philippines as Tropical Storm Dodong, was a weak but costly tropical storm that affected Philippines and the East China in early-June 2011. The sixth tropical depression and the third named storm of the 2011 Pacific typhoon season, Sarika formed from an area of low pressure near Cebu City. As it traversed the Verde Island Passage on June 8, both the JTWC and the JMA started issuing advisories on the system, with the former issuing a TCFA on the system later that day. The next day, the PAGASA upgraded the low-pressure area to a tropical depression, naming it Dodong. Moving to the north, the system struggled to intensify due to strong wind shear and was downgraded by the JTWC to a tropical depression; however, the JMA kept the system as a minimal tropical storm until it made landfall near Shantou on June 11. It dissipated soon thereafter.

Despite the system being weak, Sarika caused 3 fatalities in the Philippines, all due to drowning and the rest are from Shantou, which are for unknown reasons. The total damages from these affected countries are estimated at $248 million (2011 USD).

== Meteorological history ==
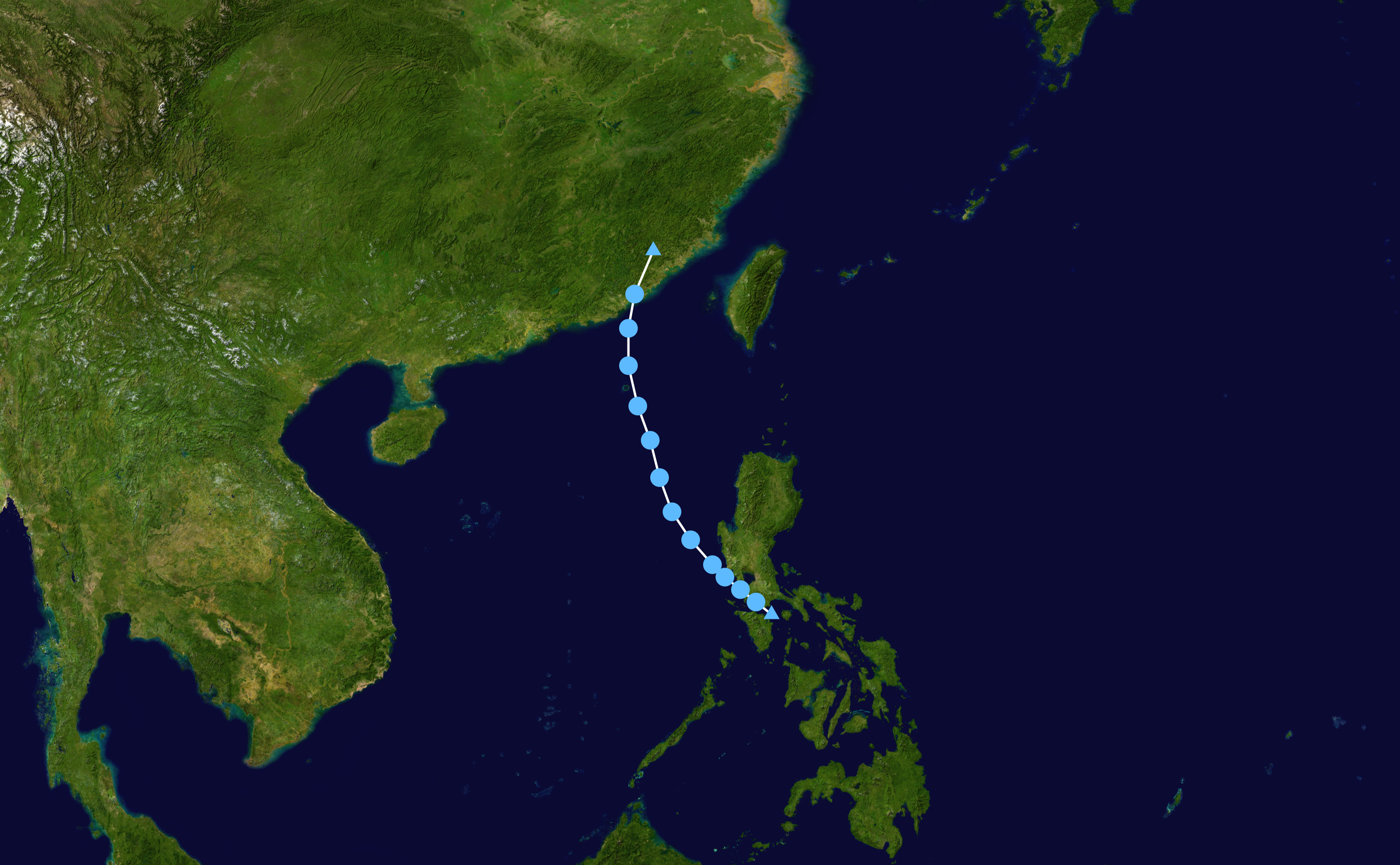
Map plotting the storm's track and intensity, according to the Saffir–Simpson scale Map key Saffir–Simpson scale Tropical depression (≤38 mph, ≤62 km/h) Tropical storm (39–73 mph, 63–118 km/h) Category 1 (74–95 mph, 119–153 km/h) Category 2 (96–110 mph, 154–177 km/h) Category 3 (111–129 mph, 178–208 km/h) Category 4 (130–156 mph, 209–251 km/h) Category 5 (≥157 mph, ≥252 km/h) Unknown Storm type Tropical cyclone Subtropical cyclone Extratropical cyclone, remnant low, tropical disturbance, or monsoon depression

An area of low pressure formed near the Verde Island Passage on June 8, to the southwest of Mariveles, Bataan. The JTWC issued a TCFA on the system later that day and the PAGASA also started issuing bulletins on it due to the proximity to the Southern Luzon landmass. On June 9, the PAGASA reported that the low-pressure area intensified to a tropical depression while located to the southwest of Iba, Zambales, earning the name Dodong. Under marginally favorable conditions, being offset by moderate wind shear, the system slowly organized, with both the JTWC and the JMA upgrading the system to a tropical depression later that day. On the next day, the two agencies (JMA and the JTWC) upgraded the system to a tropical storm, with the former naming it Sarika. The next day, the JTWC, JMA and PAGASA all reported in their bulletins that the depression intensified to a tropical storm, with the second naming the system Sarika. (Note: The name Sarika (Khmer: សារិកា, [saːriʔkaː]) was contributed by Cambodia and refers to the common hill myna (Gracula religiosa) in Khmer.) However, in the post-tropical analysis by the Joint Typhoon Warning Center, they downgraded the system to a tropical depression in its peak intensity. On that day, Dodong exited the Philippine Area of Responsibility, with the PAGASA issuing their last bulletin. Despite being disorganized due to wind shear, Sarika continued to slowly strengthen until it made landfall near Fuzhou, China on June 11 as a weak tropical storm. At this time, both the JTWC and JMA issued their last bulletin on the system as it dissipated overland. However, its remnant moisture continued to the north until it dissipated on the same day.

== Preparations and impact ==
Throughout the Philippines and the eastern China, Sarika was blamed for 26 deaths and another 13 missings and left over $248 million worth of damages.

=== Philippines ===
As Dodong formed in the Philippine Area of Responsibility, the NDRRMC issued a Public Storm Warning Signal in Cavite, Metro Manila, western Central Luzon and Pangasinan and reminded these areas to prepare and to evacuate in case of flash floods. Over 325 families were evacuated to different evacuation centers and the classes in some areas were cancelled. The Philippine Coast Guard-Calabarzon were also deployed in the South China Sea in case of marine emergencies and incidents. Some flights were cancelled due to the bad weather.

As forecasted, the newly formed depression brought scattered and sometimes, widespread rains over Calabarzon, Mimaropa, Central Luzon and the western Northern Luzon. In certain areas of Bauan, the water was up to 2 meters high, said Ginette Segismundo, a provincial informant. A landslide submerged a house awaiting renovations in San Pablo City in Laguna. The heavy rain that had been falling since Wednesday caused extensive power outages in San Pablo. In Calamba also, there were power interruptions. In the city of Balanga, strong winds swept an electric pole and a tree while in Aurora rain caused the capital city of Baler to slip into a landslide. In Malabon city, several streets have become unpassable to light cars, after floods have risen to near-cutting. The NDRRMC reported three deaths and another 3 missing, all due to drowning. An individual, on the other hand, sustained a minor injury for unknown reasons. The total damages from Dodong were estimated at ₱6,192,000.00 ($127,623.62).

=== Eastern China ===
Sarika was the first tropical cyclone in 2011 that required the Hong Kong Observatory to issue a tropical cyclone alert signal. The China's State Oceanic Authority has advised vessels in the region to take more precautionary measures to prevent the storm. Some individuals in Guangdong Province were also evacuated to safe places for the storm.

Despite Sarika making landfall as a tropical depression near Shantou, 23 deaths were attributed to the storm, mainly due to flash floods and landslides. Ten individuals were also reported missing. Sarika further worsened the situations of the floods in Guangdong Province, destroying crops and farmland. The total damages from Sarika were estimated at $248 million.

== See also ==
- Other tropical cyclones named Sarika
- Other tropical cyclones named Dodong
- Tropical Storm Haima (2011) – the next system to affect South China.
- Tropical Storm Nock-ten (2011) – mid-season typhoon that affected South China.
