= Typhoon Danas (2001) =

Pacific typhoon in 2001

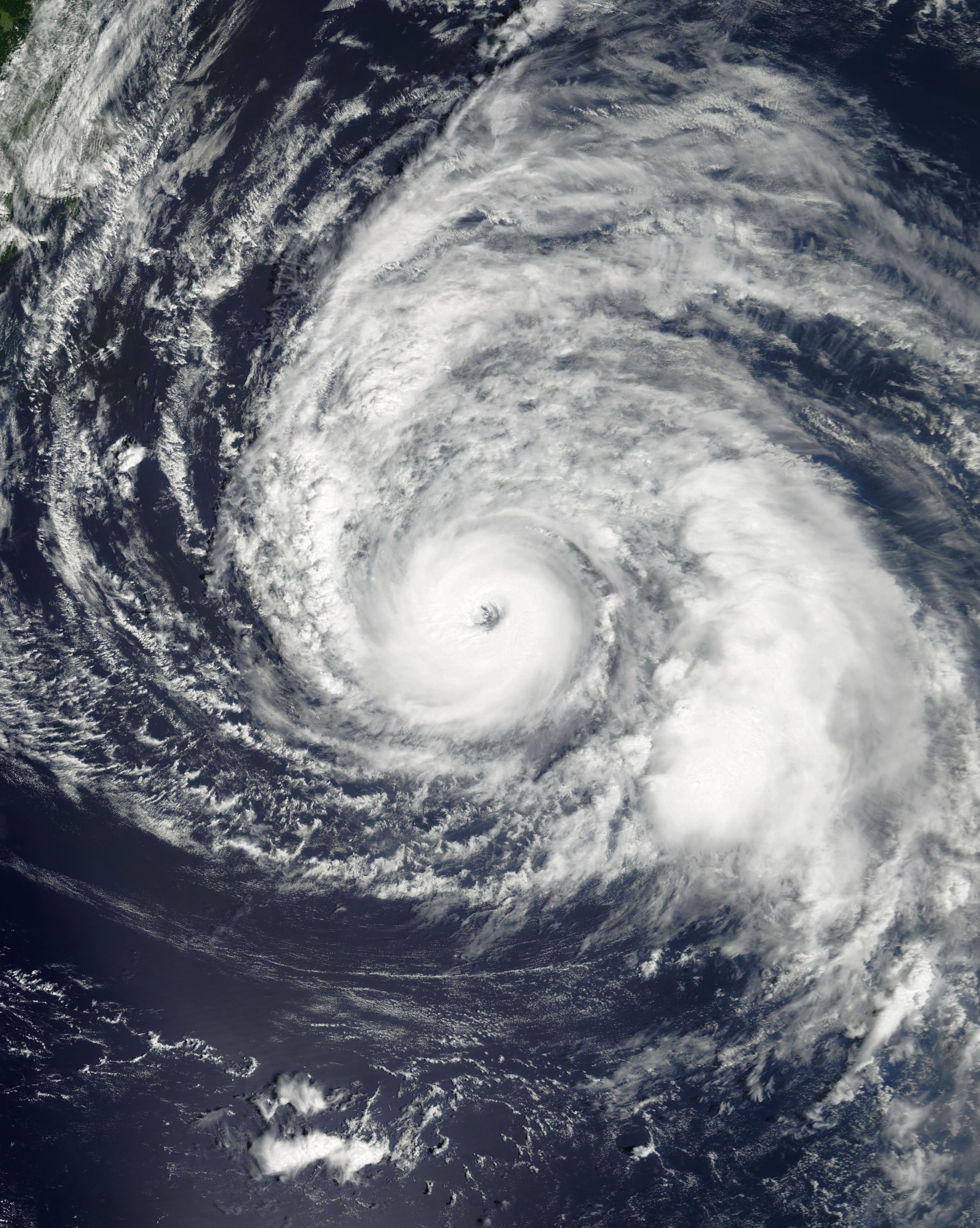
- Typhoon Danas on September 8

Meteorological history
- Formed: September 3, 2001
- Dissipated: September 12, 2001

Very strong typhoon
- 10-minute sustained (JMA)
- Highest winds: 155 km/h (100 mph)
- Lowest pressure: 945 hPa (mbar); 27.91 inHg

Category 3-equivalent typhoon
- 1-minute sustained (SSHWS/JTWC)
- Highest winds: 195 km/h (120 mph)
- Lowest pressure: 938 hPa (mbar); 27.70 inHg

Overall effects
- Fatalities: 8 total
- Damage: $963 million (2001 USD)
- Areas affected: Japan
- IBTrACS
- Part of the 2001 Pacific typhoon season

Typhoon Danas (Note: The name Danas (Tagalog: danas, [ˈdaː.nɐs]) was contributed by the Philippines and means "living, experiencing through an event" in Tagalog.) was an intense Category 3 typhoon that struck Japan in early-September 2001. As the fifteenth named storm and the seventh typhoon of the 2001 Pacific typhoon season, it originated from an area of convection many miles to the west of Wake Island. It developed gradually causing the Joint Typhoon Warning Center to issue their first warning on September 3, with the system being classified as Tropical Depression 19W. It was late upgraded to a tropical storm that same day, gaining the name Danas. It began to rapidly intensify as it moved west. It strengthened into a typhoon the following day, and Danas still continued to strengthen until it reached its peak with winds of 195 kilometres per hour (120 mph). It maintained its strength for 18 hours. It then began to head towards Japan. It quickly weakened and made landfall in Japan on September 11. After crossing the eastern portion of Honshu, Danas weakened into a tropical storm. On September 12, it transitioned into an extratropical cyclone.

Danas brought heavy rain to Japan and spawned a tornado. Transportation services were cancelled. Danas caused 8 fatalities and caused $963 million USD in damages. (Note: All damage totals are in 2001 values of their respective currencies.)

== Meteorological history ==
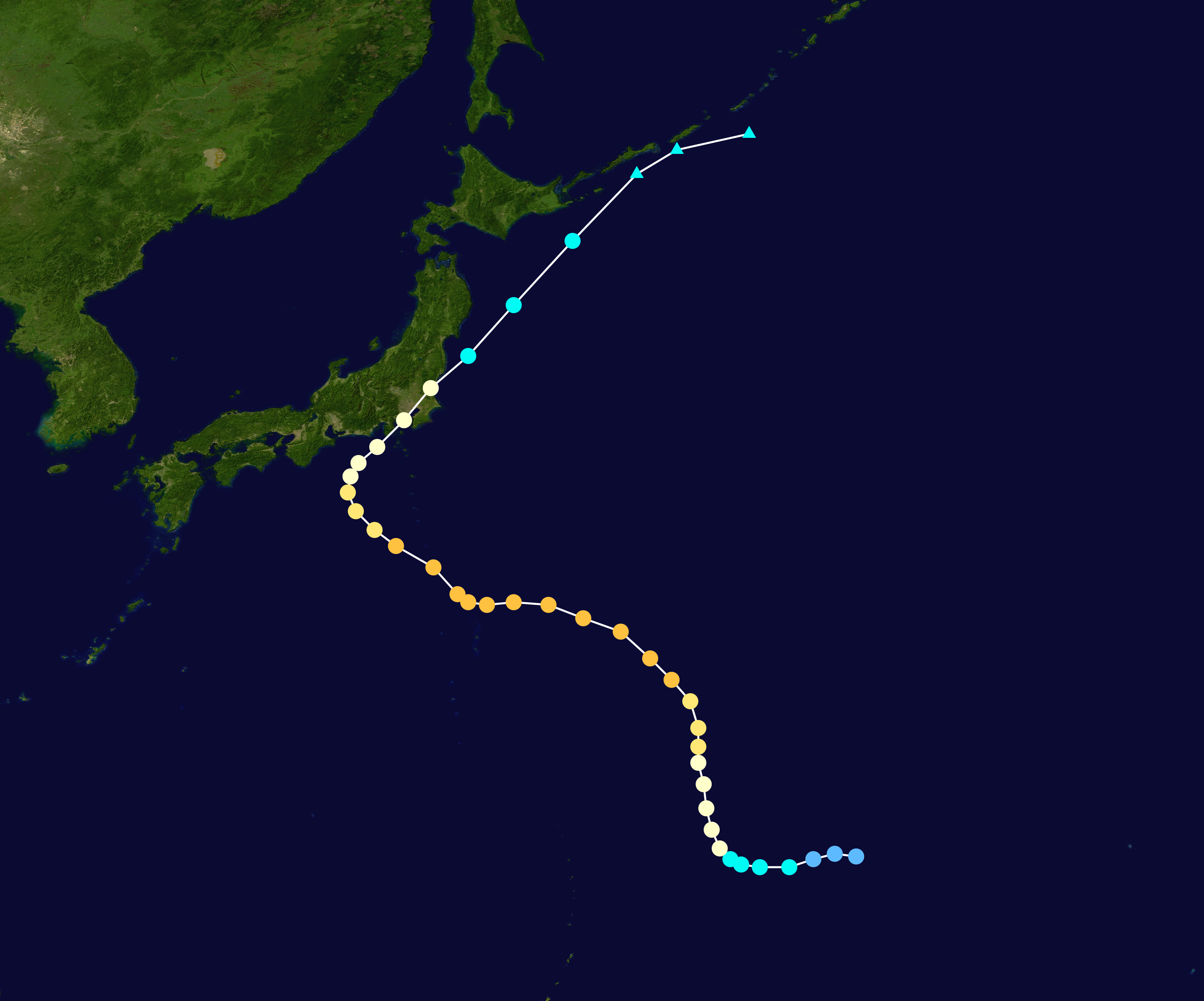
Map plotting the storm's track and intensity, according to the Saffir–Simpson scale Map key Saffir–Simpson scale Tropical depression (≤38 mph, ≤62 km/h) Tropical storm (39–73 mph, 63–118 km/h) Category 1 (74–95 mph, 119–153 km/h) Category 2 (96–110 mph, 154–177 km/h) Category 3 (111–129 mph, 178–208 km/h) Category 4 (130–156 mph, 209–251 km/h) Category 5 (≥157 mph, ≥252 km/h) Unknown Storm type Tropical cyclone Subtropical cyclone Extratropical cyclone, remnant low, tropical disturbance, or monsoon depression

An area of convection lingered roughly 833 kilometres (518 mi) to the west of Wake Island on September 2. Due to gradual development, the Joint Typhoon Warning Center issued their first warning at 00:00 UTC on September 3, designating the system as a tropical depression, with the number designation 19W. Convective organization continued to develop on that day, and both the Japan Meteorological Agency and JTWC upgraded the system to a tropical storm, designating it as Danas. Moving westward, due to a subtropical ridge located to its north, Danas rapidly intensified. The JTWC upgraded Danas to a minimal typhoon by 18:00 UTC on September 4, while the JMA did the same six hours later. As the typhoon began moving northward, satellite imagery depicted development of an eye that was small with good convective banding. Due to this, Danas intensified into a Category 2 typhoon. By 06:00 UTC of September 6, Danas reached peak intensity as a Category 4 typhoon; however, post-analysis after the season showed that Danas only peaked as a Category 3 typhoon with 1-minute sustained winds of 195 kilometres per hour (120 mph). The typhoon continued to keep its intensity for the next 18 hours, until its eye was covered by clouds. Danas headed westward until a mid-latitude trough had weakened the subtropical ridge, causing the storm to move in a north-northeastward direction. The typhoon began to rapidly weaken, and by 00:35 UTC of September 11, Danas had made landfall just to the southwest of Yokosuka. After crossing the eastern portion of Honshu, Danas weakened into a tropical storm. Both the JMA and the JTWC issued its final advisory on Danas on September 12, when it transitioned into an extratropical cyclone. Its remnants reached the Aleutian Islands two days later.

== Preparations and impact ==
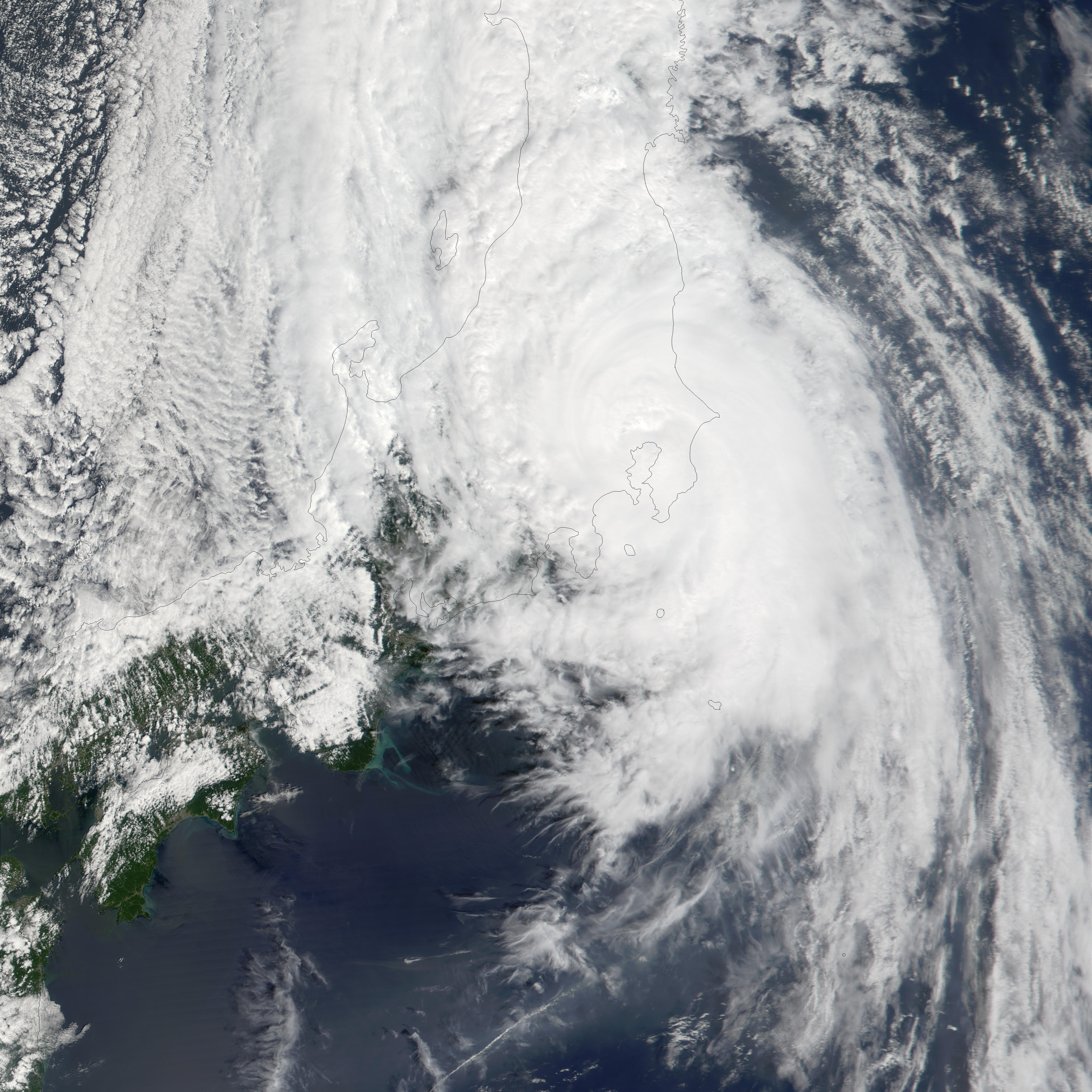
Typhoon Danas making landfall in Japan on September 11

On September 10, Danas spawned a tornado near the city of Ochiai, just outside Tokyo. Along its track, the tornado damaged roofs, downed trees and injured one person. Following an assessment of the damage, the Tokyo District Meteorological Observatory ranked it as an F1 on the Fujita scale. According to reliable records, this was the eleventh tornado to touch down in the Kantō region. The town of Nikkō had recorded 870 mm (34 in) of rainfall over a four-day period. More than 140 domestic and international flights were canceled due to extreme winds and torrential rainfall. About 9,600 rail passengers were left without transport in central Japan after strong winds and lashing rains kept multiple trains from leaving stations. Throughout Japan, Danas was responsible for eight fatalities and injured 48 people. Damages from the storm amounted to ¥117 billion (US$963 million). Danas was the second typhoon to hit Japan in less than a month.

== See also ==
- Other tropical cyclones named Danas
- Typhoon Lola (1953) – took a nearly identical track.
- Typhoon Vernon (1993) – a typhoon that affected similar areas.
- Typhoon Fitow (2007) – a category 1 equivalent typhoon that took a comparable track.
- Typhoon Man-yi (2013) – took a similar track.
- Typhoon Mindulle (2016) – a category 1 equivalent typhoon that affected similar areas.
- Typhoon Shanshan (2018) – a category 2 equivalent typhoon that took a nearly identical track.
- Typhoon Faxai (2019) – a very intense typhoon that took a comparable track.
- Typhoon Hagibis (2019) – a large and costly typhoon that caused widespread destruction in Japan.
