= Typhoon Man-yi (2007) =

Pacific typhoon in 2007

Typhoon Man-yi (Bebeng)
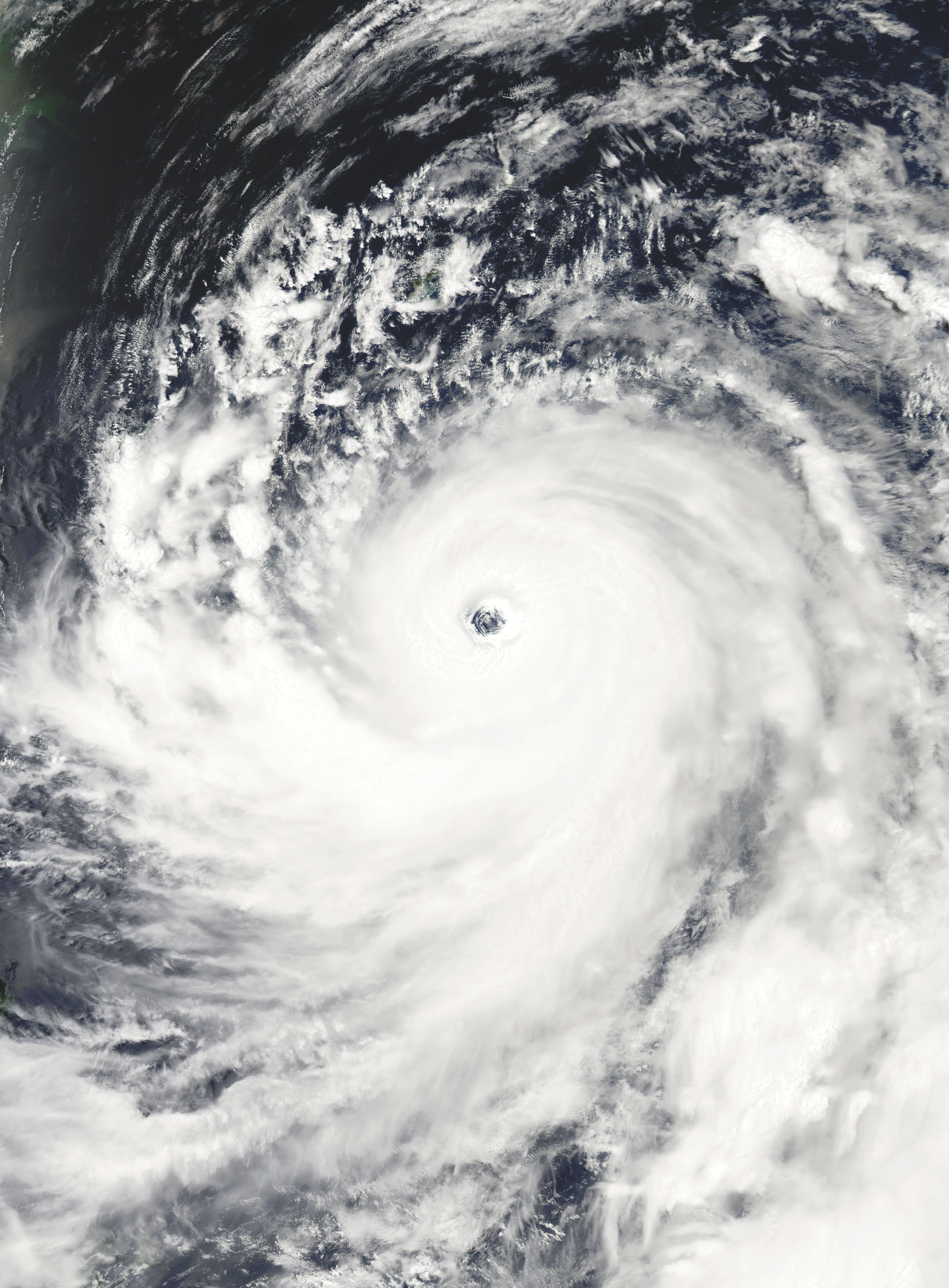
- Typhoon Man-yi near its peak intensity on July 12

Meteorological history
- Formed: July 9, 2007
- Extratropical: July 15, 2007
- Dissipated: July 16, 2007

Very strong typhoon
- 10-minute sustained (JMA)
- Highest winds: 185 km/h (115 mph)
- Lowest pressure: 930 hPa (mbar); 27.46 inHg

Category 4-equivalent super typhoon
- 1-minute sustained (SSHWS/JTWC)
- Highest winds: 250 km/h (155 mph)
- Lowest pressure: 904 hPa (mbar); 26.70 inHg

Overall effects
- Fatalities: 6
- Missing: 7
- Damage: $499 million (2007 USD)
- Areas affected: Philippines, Japan, Taiwan
- IBTrACS
- Part of the 2007 Pacific typhoon season

Typhoon Man-yi, known in the Philippines as Typhoon Bebeng, was a powerful tropical cyclone that battered Japan as a weakening typhoon and became the second super typhoon of the 2007 Pacific typhoon season, just after Yutu. The fourth named storm and the third typhoon of this season, Man-yi formed from a monsoon trough near the Philippines on July 5. The disturbance gradually organized and on 12:00 UTC on July 27, the JTWC issued a TCFA for the developing system. Under favorable conditions, the disturbance rapidly organized to a tropical storm, with the JMA naming it Man-yi. As it entered the Philippine Area of Responsibility on July 11, the storm explosively organized on the Philippine Sea, before passing near Okinawa on 13:00 UTC on the next day. Man-yi began to weaken on July 13 due to increasingly unfavorable conditions, before scraping southern Japan on the night of the same day. Due to the deteriorating conditions of the typhoon, the JMA and the JTWC downgraded the system to a tropical storm, before issuing their final warning as it became extratropical on July 15.

As a result of the typhoon, a Chinese vessel sank about 600 kilometers northwest of Guam, killing three of its crew members and leaving seven others missing. An 11-year-old boy was feared to be dead after he was swept away by a fast-moving river while trying to pick up a ball. Total damages of the typhoon was almost US$500 million.

== Meteorological history ==
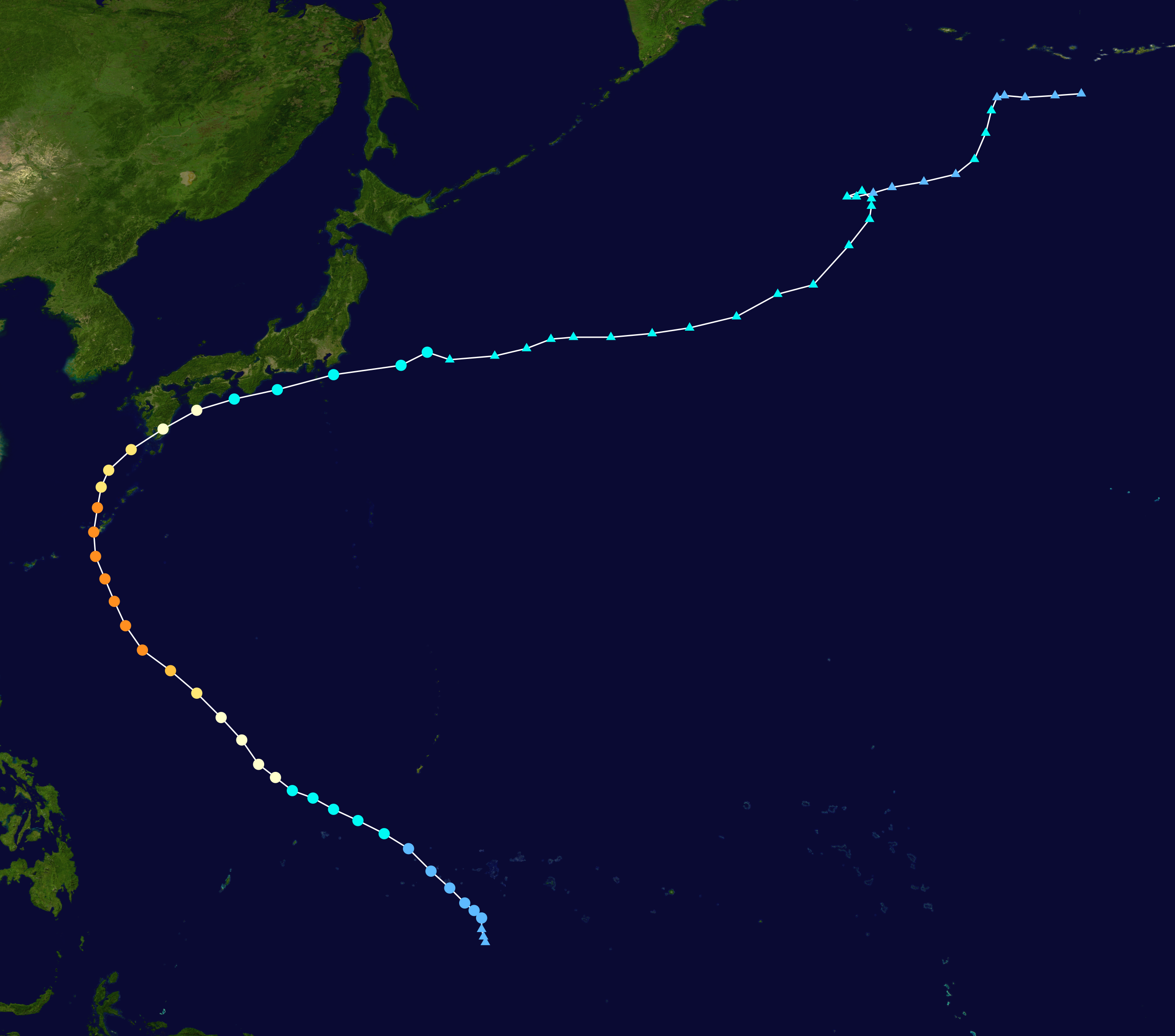
Map plotting the storm's track and intensity, according to the Saffir–Simpson scale Map key Saffir–Simpson scale Tropical depression (≤38 mph, ≤62 km/h) Tropical storm (39–73 mph, 63–118 km/h) Category 1 (74–95 mph, 119–153 km/h) Category 2 (96–110 mph, 154–177 km/h) Category 3 (111–129 mph, 178–208 km/h) Category 4 (130–156 mph, 209–251 km/h) Category 5 (≥157 mph, ≥252 km/h) Unknown Storm type Tropical cyclone Subtropical cyclone Extratropical cyclone, remnant low, tropical disturbance, or monsoon depression

On 4 July, the Joint Typhoon Warning Center began tracking a disturbed area just north of the equator. Although the system was in a "marginal upper-level area" with moderate vertical wind shear, the circulation center and surrounding convection began to take shape. The system further consolidated with "deep convective banding" and improving upper level conditions, with the Joint Typhoon Warning Center issuing a Tropical Cyclone Formation Alert, several hours later. The JTWC then upgraded into a tropical storm the night when depression gained further organization. The JMA followed suit, upgrading it to a tropical storm later that evening as the large system consolidated, naming it Man-yi. (Note: The name Man-yi (Cantonese: 萬宜, [maːn˨ jiː˨˩]) was contributed by Hong Kong and refers to High Island Reservoir in Cantonese.) Man-yi continued to organize and became a severe tropical storm on July 9, before becoming a typhoon, the next day, according to JTWC. It entered the Philippine Area of Responsibility, as both the PAGASA and JMA stated that Man-yi became a typhoon, with the former naming it Bebeng.

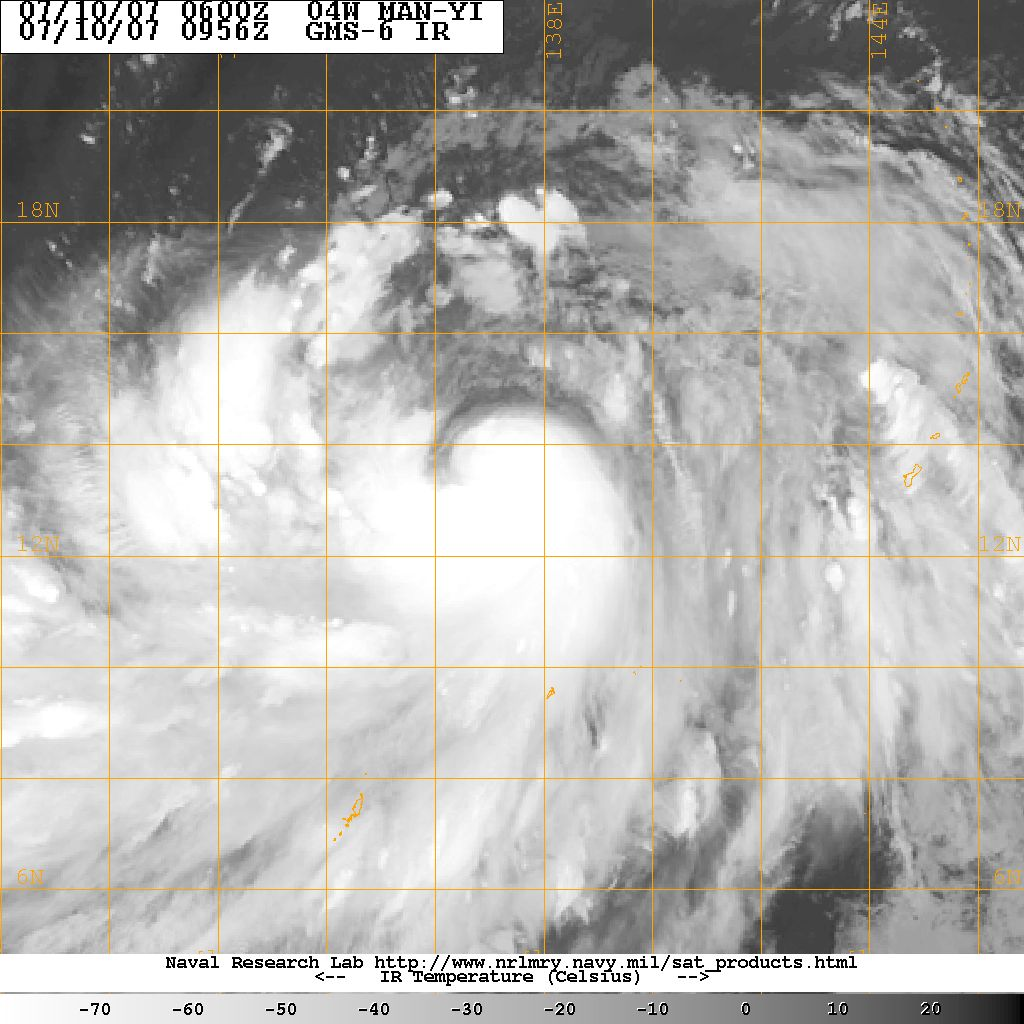
Typhoon Man-yi rapidly intensifying on July 10

Moving over warmer waters, Man-yi underwent rapid intensification late on July 11 and early on July 12, as it churned towards Okinawa in Japan, shortly before the JTWC declared Man-yi as a super typhoon. The PAGASA issued their final bulletin for the storm as it left out of their area of responsibility, before hitting Ryukyu Islands as a Category 4 super typhoon. As the typhoon entered unfavorable conditions, adding the brief land interaction with the nearby Japan, it slowly weakened until it made landfall in Kagoshima Prefecture on Kyūshū early the next day before turning to the east and making two more in Kōchi Prefecture on Shikoku and in Wakayama Prefecture on Honshū.

As it interacted with the country and the nearby jet stream, Man-yi rapidly degraded to a tropical storm and started extratropical transition, on July 14. It became extratropical on the next day, ending the advisories of JMA and the JTWC.

== Preparations ==
=== Guam ===
Tropical storm warnings and typhoon watches were put in place for most of Yap State at some point during the storm.

=== Philippines and Taiwan ===
There were no public storm wind signals raised due to the typhoon expected not to make landfall in the Philippines; however, the PAGASA stated that Man-yi will induce the southwest monsoon, which can trigger landslides and flash floods, particularly in the western section of the country.

The Central Weather Bureau of Taiwan noted that even the typhoon will pass to the east of the country, it might indirectly affect Taiwan's weather conditions when it nears close to the island.

=== Japan ===
The United States Military upgraded the Tropical Cyclone Condition of Readiness (TCCOR) levels for Kantō, Yokosuka, Sasebo and Okinawa on the afternoon of July 12 as Man-yi neared the islands.

Officials recommended the evacuation of thousands of families, while about 4,200 people fled for themselves to evacuation camps. Train services were stopped, roads blocked, 213 flights to and from Shanghai and Seoul, were all cancelled.

== Impact ==
=== Philippines and Guam ===
Strong waves from the typhoon capsized a ship 375 miles (604 km) to the northwest of Guam, killing three and leaving six missing. Downed electricity lines from Man-yi caused widespread power outages on Guam. Damages in Guam amounted to be US$10,000.

Despite Man-yi exiting the PAR on July 13, the big rainbands of the typhoon associated with the prevailing southwest monsoon brought heavy rainfall in parts of the Northern, Central and the Southern Luzon. There were also reports of landslides and flooding.

=== Japan ===
The Funagira Dam overflowing due to Man-yi

The Akiba Dam after Man-yi

Some TV footages showed high winds in Shizuoka's central prefecture pounding rocky shorelines, and a landslide in Chiba to the further north flattened one home. Power outages affected a total of 744 households while water was cut by landslides in some areas. The Funagira Dam in Shizuoka Prefecture overflowed due to the heavy rains associated with Man-yi. Three people were killed, among them an 11-year old kid who drowned in a river. Another man was left missing. Damages from Man-yi and the plum rain reached 60.9 billion JPY (US$499 million).

In Kadena Air Base, some trees and branches were knocked down due to the strong winds from Man-yi. There were reports of power outages and an interrupted supply of water due to the typhoon. Post mortem, Typhoon Man-yi has been the most powerful typhoon since 2003 to strike the base.

Not after the typhoon passed, the Niigata Chuetsu-oki Earthquake happened, which brought further devastation to Japan as it struck Kaminakaetsu, Niigata Prefecture with a magnitude of 6.6 M_{w}.

== See also ==
- Other tropical cyclones named Man-yi
- Other tropical cyclones named Bebeng
- Typhoon Usagi (2007) - a typhoon that brought further devastation to southern Japan as it made landfall on the area in late-July 2007.
- Typhoon Fitow (2007) - another typhoon that strikes southern Japan on early-September 2007.
- Isewan Typhoon - the strongest and deadliest typhoon to strike Japan.
