= Typhoon Nari (2001) =

Pacific typhoon in 2001

Typhoon Nari (Kiko)
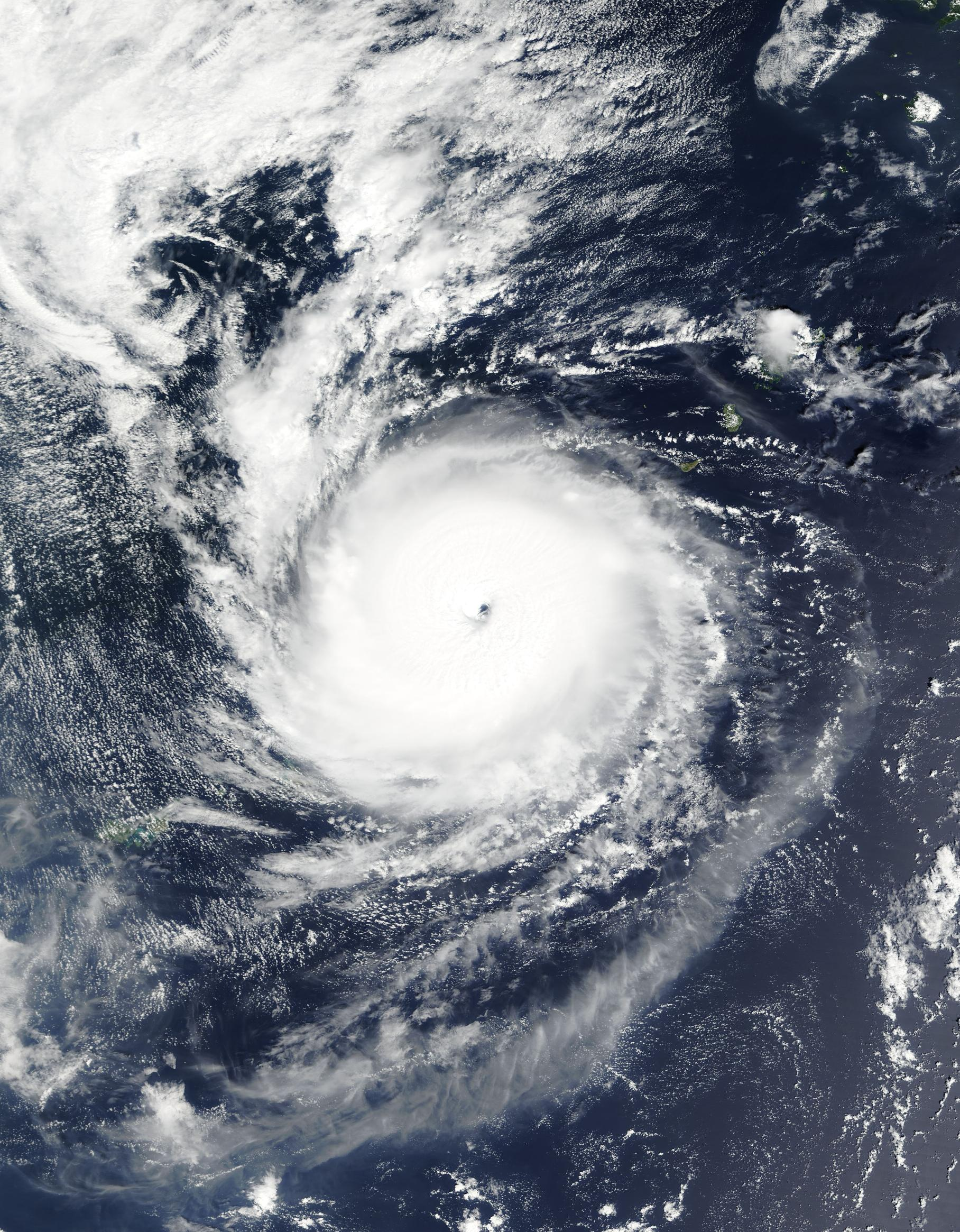
- Nari near peak intensity on September 11.

Meteorological history
- Formed: 5 September 2001
- Dissipated: 21 September 2001

Typhoon
- 10-minute sustained (JMA)
- Highest winds: 140 km/h (85 mph)
- Lowest pressure: 960 hPa (mbar); 28.35 inHg

Category 3-equivalent typhoon
- 1-minute sustained (SSHWS/JTWC)
- Highest winds: 185 km/h (115 mph)
- Lowest pressure: 944 hPa (mbar); 27.88 inHg

Overall effects
- Fatalities: 104 direct
- Damage: $443 million (2001 USD)
- Areas affected: Ryukyu Islands, Taiwan, Southern China
- IBTrACS
- Part of the 2001 Pacific typhoon season

Typhoon Nari, (Note: The name Nari (Korean: 나리, [ˈna̠(ː)ɾi]) was contributed by South Korea and means lily in Korean.) known in the Philippines as Tropical Storm Kiko, was an unusually long-lived Category 3 typhoon that took an erratic, two-week track near Taiwan. It also considered as the second wettest typhoon to hit the country. It was the 16th named typhoon in the 2001 Pacific typhoon season.

== Meteorological history ==
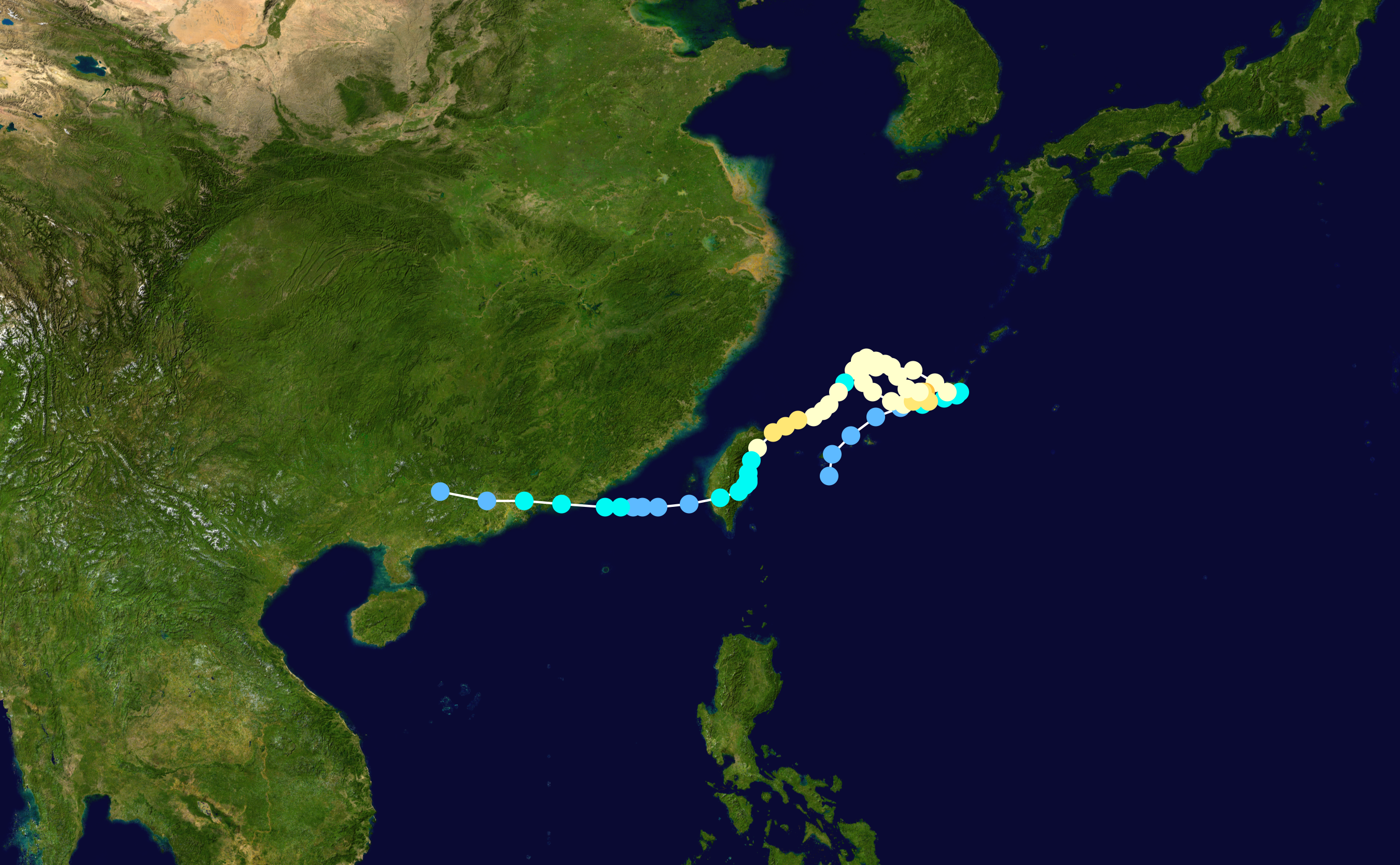
Map plotting the storm's track and intensity, according to the Saffir–Simpson scale Map key Saffir–Simpson scale Tropical depression (≤38 mph, ≤62 km/h) Tropical storm (39–73 mph, 63–118 km/h) Category 1 (74–95 mph, 119–153 km/h) Category 2 (96–110 mph, 154–177 km/h) Category 3 (111–129 mph, 178–208 km/h) Category 4 (130–156 mph, 209–251 km/h) Category 5 (≥157 mph, ≥252 km/h) Unknown Storm type Tropical cyclone Subtropical cyclone Extratropical cyclone, remnant low, tropical disturbance, or monsoon depression

On 31 August 2001, a weak low-pressure area formed south of Guam. By 5 September, it merged with a monsoonal trough and strengthened into the 26th tropical depression of the season northeast of Taiwan. A large, dry airflow from the northwest caused the storm to drift northeast where it became a tropical storm on 6 September. Nari was stationary near Okinawa due to the subtropical ridge dipping near Japan and became a typhoon on the 7th. On 9 September, at around 7:00(UTC), Nari developed an eye, which collapsed 14 hours later due to dry air inflowing around the storm, associated with an upper-level trough, causing leading to the system's decrease in size while becoming stationary. On 10 September, Nari was pulled slightly to the east by Typhoon Danas. At the same time, it made a small burst of convection as wind shear lowered and rapidly intensified into a Category 3 typhoon, reaching a peak of 115 mph (185 km/h) winds before weakening to a tropical storm on the 14th. It restrengthened to a typhoon, and as it continued southwestward, Nari reached 100 mph (160 km/h) winds before hitting northeastern Taiwan on the 16th. The storm drifted across the island, emerging into the South China Sea on the 18th as a tropical depression. It continued westward and made landfall east of Hong Kong as a 65 mph (105 km/h) tropical storm on the 20th.

== Impact ==
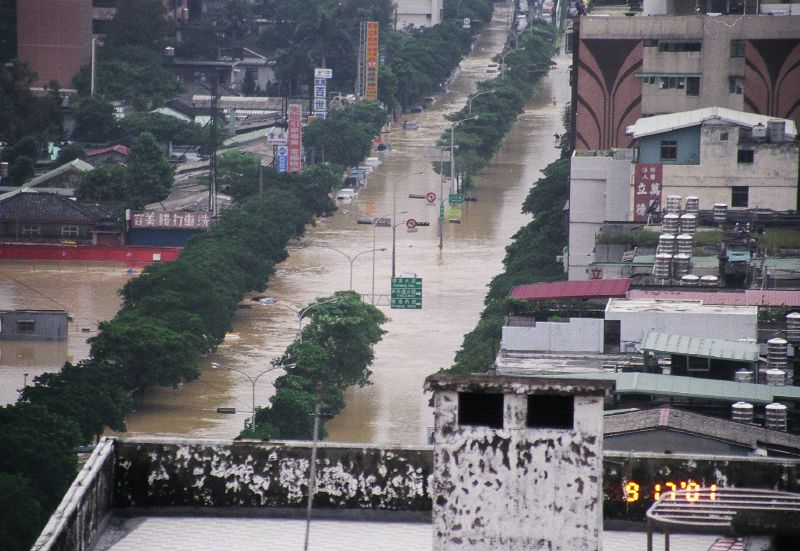
Flooding caused by the typhoon in Taipei.

Striking two months after Taiwan's second deadliest typhoon, Toraji, Nari brought torrential rainfall to much of the island. Numerous landslides triggered by the storm's rain destroyed homes and buried people. At least 94 people died on the island and ten others were missing. Agricultural losses from Nari were estimated at NT$2.9 billion (US$84 million). In mountainous regions, more than 1,225 mm (48.2 in) of rain fell over two days, leading to many rivers overflowing their banks. On 17 September, some areas recorded a record-breaking 800 mm (31 in) during a single day, equivalent to four months of rain in Taiwan. At the height of the storm, an estimated 650,000 people were without power and 350,000 lost their water and telephone service. Most of the fatalities took place around the city of Taipei and nearby counties. The metro system in the city was severely damaged by floods and was not expected to be working for at least six months.

== Aftermath ==
Wettest tropical cyclones and their remnants in Taiwan Highest-known totals
Precipitation			Storm	Location	Ref.
Rank	mm	in	Storm	Location	Ref.
1	3,060	120.47	Morakot 2009	Alishan, Chiayi	
2	2,319	91.30	Nari 2001	Wulai, New Taipei	
3	2,162	85.12	Flossie 1969	Beitou, Taipei	
4	1,987	78.23	Herb 1996	Alishan, Chiayi	
5	1,933	76.10	Gaemi 2024	Maolin, Kaoshiung	
6	1,774	69.84	Saola 2012	Yilan City	
7	1,725	67.91	Krathon 2024	Beinan, Taitung	
8	1,700	66.93	Lynn 1987	Taipei	
9	1,672	65.83	Clara 1967	Dongshan, Yilan	
10	1,611	63.43	Sinlaku 2008	Heping, Taichung	

In response to the severe damage, the Taiwanese government deployed roughly 8,000 soldiers to assist in search-and-rescue operations across the island. Nearly 10,000 people in northern and central Taiwan were relocated to shelters across the region.

Already suffering from an economic downturn from the September 11 attacks in the United States, the economy of Taiwan was severely affected by Nari. Businesses were shut down across the island and the stock exchange was closed for several days. Moreover, after it reopened, there was significantly less stock activity as hundreds of thousands of residents were either unable to get to work or hampered by travel issues. The combination of the two events was estimated to have reduced the gross domestic product of Taiwan by 0.2%, roughly NT$19.4 billion (US$560 million).

== See also ==
- Other tropical cyclones named Nari
- Other tropical cyclones named Kiko
- List of wettest tropical cyclones
