= List of storms named Mun =

List of storms with the same or similar names

The name Mun (Yapese: Muun, [mʊːn]) has been used for two tropical cyclones in the West Pacific Ocean. The name, contributed by Micronesia, refers to the fifth month of the Yapese lunar calendar in the Marbaaq dialect of Yapese. This month corresponds to around June in the Gregorian calendar. Also, Mun replaced the name Fitow on the naming lists.

- Tropical Storm Mun (2019; T1904, 05W) – a weak tropical storm that nearly crossed the Gulf of Tonkin to the coast of Vietnam and made landfall in Northern Vietnam killed two people.
- Severe Tropical Storm Mun (2025) (T2503, 04W) – a severe tropical storm that did not affect land.

== See also ==
- Tropical Storm Mulan (2022) – a West Pacific tropical storm with a similar name.

Preceded by Sepat	Pacific typhoon season names Mun	Succeeded by Danas
