= Ochiai =

Ochiai (written: 落合) is a Japanese surname. Notable people with the surname include:

- Fukushi Ochiai (落合 福嗣; born 1987), Japanese voice actor
- Hidy Ochiai (落合 秀彦; born 1939), Japanese judoka, karateka and writer
- Hiromitsu Ochiai (落合 博満; born 1953), Japanese baseball player and manager
- Hiroshi Ochiai (落合 弘; born 1946), Japanese footballer
- Kentaro Ochiai, Japanese diplomat at Paris Peace Conference (1919–1920)
- Masayuki Ochiai (落合 正幸), Japanese film director
- Ochiai Michihisa (落合 道久), Japanese samurai
- Motoki Ochiai (落合 モトキ; born 1990), Japanese actor
- Ochiai Naobumi (落合 直文; 1861–1903), pseudonym of Ayukai Morimitsu, Japanese poet
- Nobuhiko Ochiai (落合 信彦; 1942–2026), Japanese journalist and novelist
- Osamu Ochiai (落合 治; born 1931), Japanese sport shooter
- Rumi Ochiai (落合 るみ; born 1973), Japanese voice actress
- Tomoya Ochiai (落合 知也; born 1987), Japanese basketball player
- Tetsuya Ochiai (落合 哲也; born 2003), Japanese sumo wrestler competing under the name Hakunofuji
- Yoichi Ochiai (落合 陽; born 1987), is a Japanese academic and media artist

== See also ==
- Ochiai, Okayama, a former town in Maniwa District, Okayama Prefecture, Japan
- Ochiai Station (disambiguation), multiple railway stations in Japan
