= List of storms named Falcon =

The name Falcon has been used for six tropical cyclones in the Philippine Area of Responsibility by PAGASA in the Western Pacific Ocean. It refers to a kind of bird of the same name.

- Tropical Depression Falcon (2003) – a tropical depression that was only recognized by PAGASA.
- Typhoon Nari (2007) (T0711, 12W, Falcon) – struck South Korea.
- Severe Tropical Storm Meari (2011) (T1105, 07W, Falcon) – approached Korea.
- Typhoon Chan-hom (2015) (T1509, 09W, Falcon) – passed between Okinawa and Miyako-jima.
- Tropical Storm Danas (2019) (T1905, 06W, Falcon) – only caused minimal damages throughout its path.
- Typhoon Khanun (2023) (T2306, 06W, Falcon) – lingered the Okinawa Islands, and eventually struck Korea.

Preceded by Emil	Philippine typhoon names Falcon	Succeeded by Gavino
