= List of storms named Nari =

The name Nari (Korean: 나리, [ˈna̠(ː)ɾi]) has been used for five tropical cyclones in the West Pacific Ocean. The name, contributed by South Korea, means lily in Korean.

- Typhoon Nari (2001) (T0116, 20W, Kiko) – An erratic typhoon which approached Okinawa and struck Taiwan and China.
- Typhoon Nari (2007) (T0711, 12W, Falcon) – struck South Korea.
- Typhoon Nari (2013) (T1325, 24W, Santi) – struck Vietnam and the Philippines as a typhoon.
- Tropical Storm Nari (2019) (T1906, 07W) – struck Japan.
- Tropical Storm Nari (2025) (T2505, 06W) – formed off the coast of Japan.

== See also ==
Storms with similar names

- Typhoon Nabi (2005) – a Category-5 equivalent Pacific typhoon that made landfall in Japan.
- Tropical Storm Narra (2026) – a West Pacific tropical storm.

Preceded by Danas	Pacific typhoon season names Nari	Succeeded by Wipha
