= List of storms named Meari =

The name Meari (Korean: 메아리, [me.a.ɾi]) has been used for four tropical cyclones in the western North Pacific Ocean. The name was contributed by North Korea and means "echo" in Korean.

- Typhoon Meari (2004) (T0421, 25W, Quinta) – a Category 4-equivalent typhoon that killed 27 people in Japan.
- Tropical Storm Meari (2011) (T1105, 07W, Falcon) – a severe tropical storm that caused heavy precipitation in the Philippines, South Korea, and North Korea.
- Typhoon Meari (2016) (T1623, 26W) – churned in the open ocean.
- Tropical Storm Meari (2022) (T2208, 09W) – resulted in the cancellation of the 2022 Rock in Japan Festival's final day and three J1 League games.

Preceded by Mulan	Pacific typhoon season names Meari	Succeeded by Tsing-ma
