= Typhoon Nari (2007) =

Pacific typhoon in 2007

Typhoon Nari (Falcon)
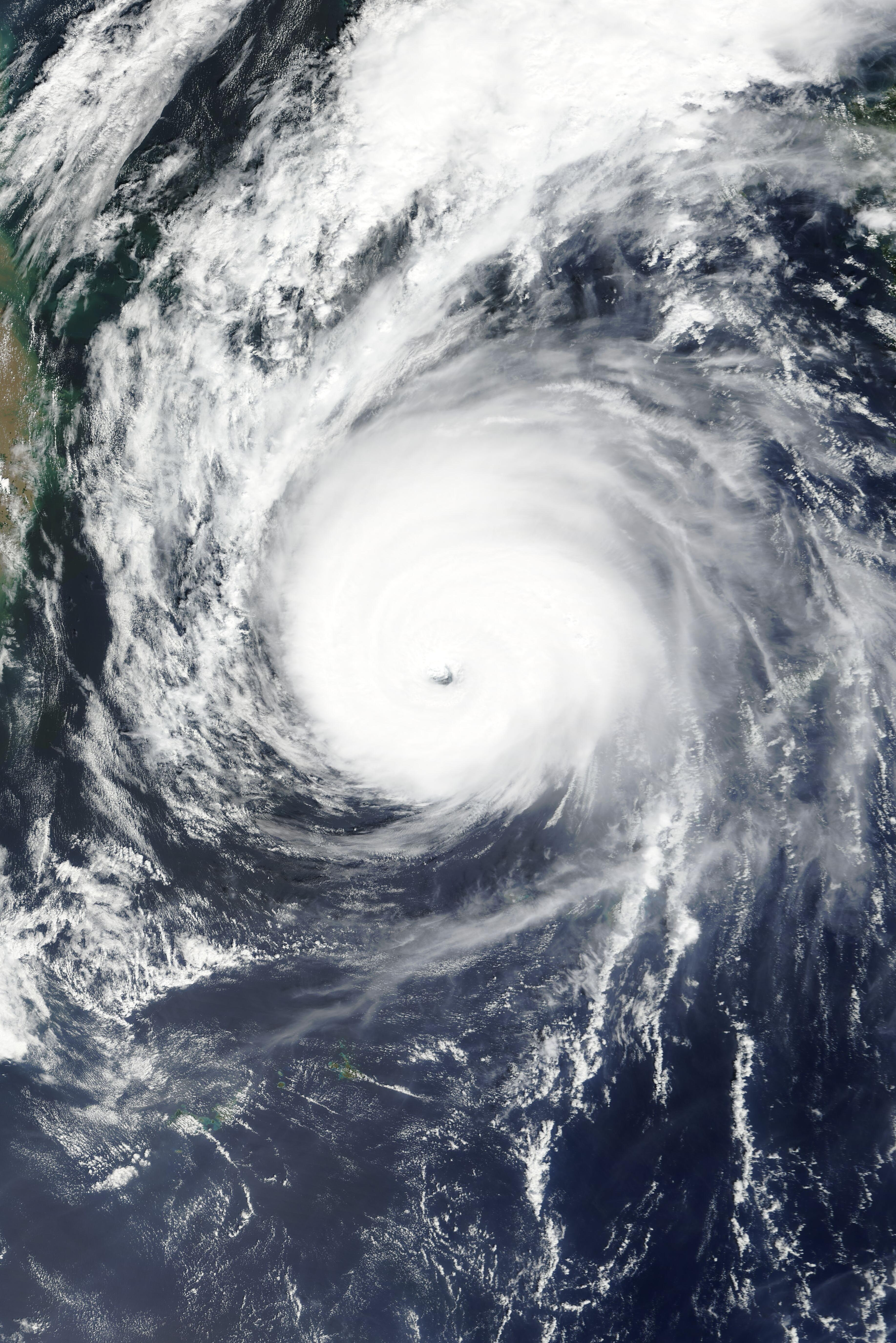
- Typhoon Nari shortly after peak intensity on September 15

Meteorological history
- Formed: September 11, 2007
- Extratropical: September 17, 2007
- Dissipated: September 20, 2007

Very strong typhoon
- 10-minute sustained (JMA)
- Highest winds: 185 km/h (115 mph)
- Lowest pressure: 935 hPa (mbar); 27.61 inHg

Category 4-equivalent typhoon
- 1-minute sustained (SSHWS/JTWC)
- Highest winds: 230 km/h (145 mph)
- Lowest pressure: 929 hPa (mbar); 27.43 inHg

Overall effects
- Fatalities: 23 direct
- Damage: $393 million (2007 USD)
- Areas affected: Japan and South Korea
- IBTrACS
- Part of the 2007 Pacific typhoon season

Typhoon Nari, (Note: The name Nari (Korean: 나리, [ˈna̠(ː)ɾi]) was contributed by South Korea and means lily in Korean.) known in the Philippines as Typhoon Falcon, was a small but powerful typhoon which struck the Korean Peninsula in early September 2007.

== Meteorological history ==
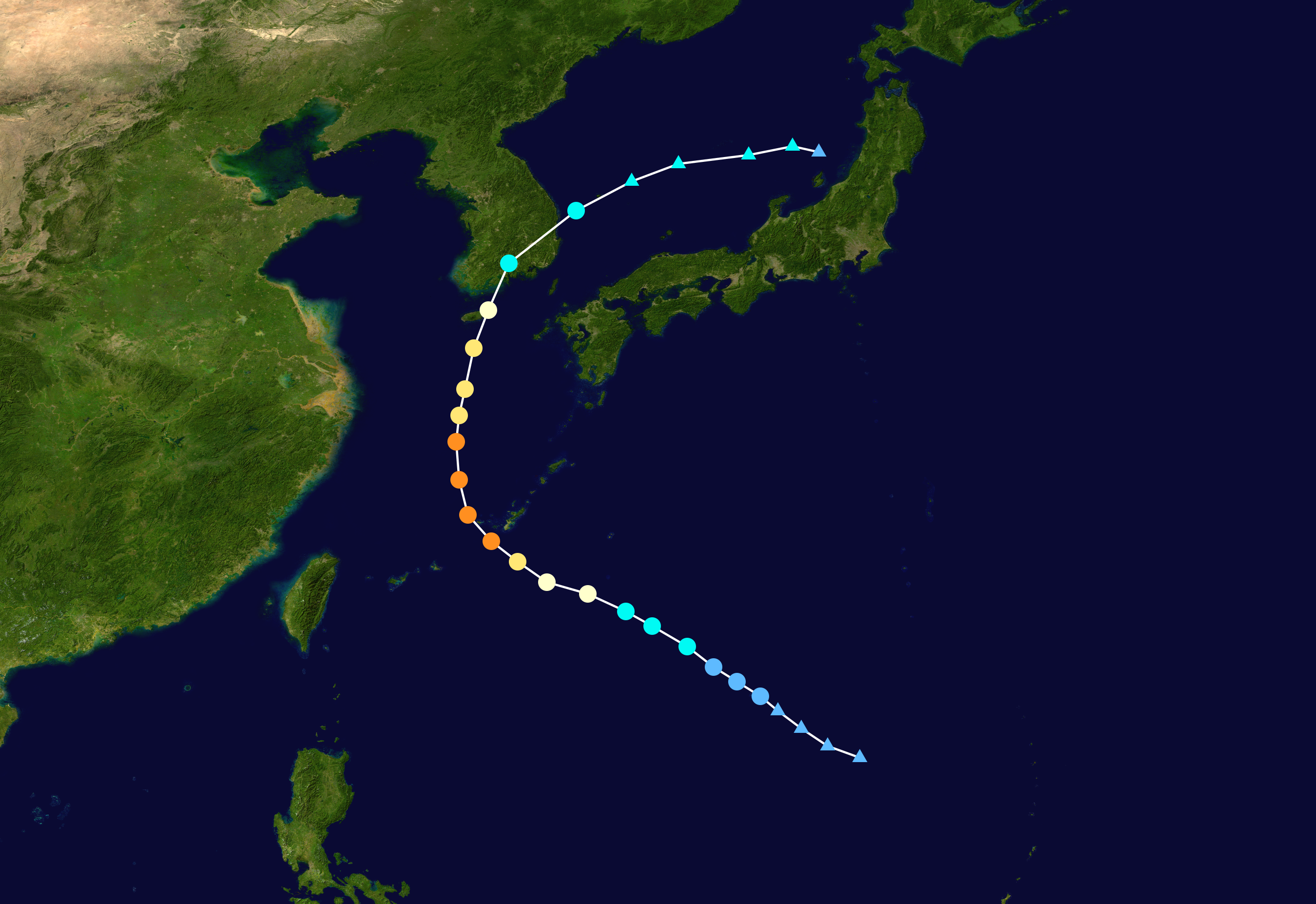
Map plotting the storm's track and intensity, according to the Saffir–Simpson scale Map key Saffir–Simpson scale Tropical depression (≤38 mph, ≤62 km/h) Tropical storm (39–73 mph, 63–118 km/h) Category 1 (74–95 mph, 119–153 km/h) Category 2 (96–110 mph, 154–177 km/h) Category 3 (111–129 mph, 178–208 km/h) Category 4 (130–156 mph, 209–251 km/h) Category 5 (≥157 mph, ≥252 km/h) Unknown Storm type Tropical cyclone Subtropical cyclone Extratropical cyclone, remnant low, tropical disturbance, or monsoon depression

An area of disturbed weather developed northwest of Guam on September 10 and moved northwestward, slowly increasing in organisation. The Japan Meteorological Agency began monitoring the system as a tropical depression the next day. The depression continued to organise and strengthen, and the Joint Typhoon Warning Center issued a Tropical Cyclone Formation Alert on it during the afternoon of September 12, and began issuing advisories on Tropical Depression 12W an hour later. The JMA followed suit early on September 13 and initiated advisories on the system; PAGASA named the system Falcon shortly after. The depression continued to intensify, and the JMA upgraded it to Tropical Storm Nari later that morning. The storm then underwent rapid intensification that afternoon and evening, strengthening from a tropical depression to a typhoon in just 18 hours. The JMA upgraded Nari to a severe tropical storm late that afternoon, and by late that evening, Nari was upgraded to a typhoon. Nari reached its peak on September 14, and began weakening soon afterwards. It turned extratropical right after landfall in South Korea at tropical storm strength.

== Preparations ==
=== Okinawa ===
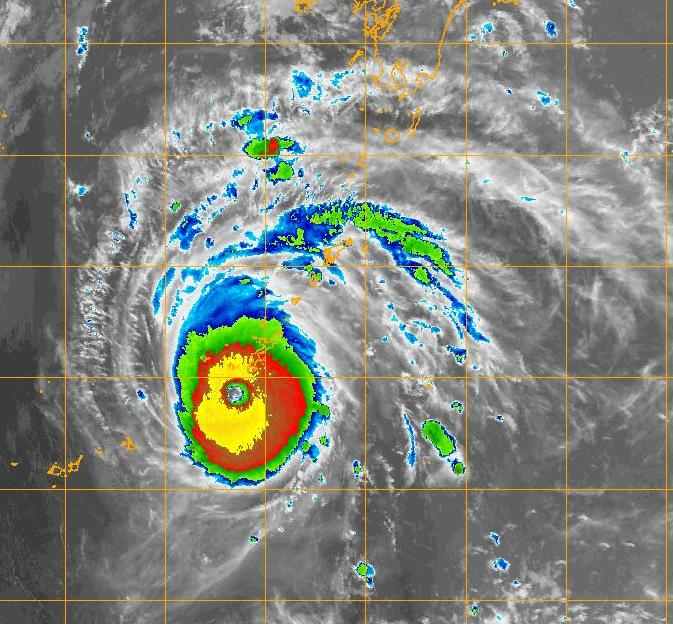
Enhanced Infra-red satellite image of Typhoon Nari near Okinawa on September 14

On September 14, Japan Airlines cancelled 14 flights in and out of Okinawa, affecting an estimated 5,300 people. All Nippon Airways cancelled 54 flights, Ryukyu Air Commuter cancelled 24, Skymark cancelled two, and Japan Airlines cancelled an additional 16 flights the next day. An estimated 21,000 passengers cancelled their flights arrangements due to Nari. United States Marine bases located in Okinawa were placed under Tropical Cyclone Condition of Readiness-3 as Nari approached the islands on September 15. Aircraft and important equipment were secured to prevent damage to them. Several of the more important aircraft were transported to other locations throughout the Pacific. Working parties were scrambled to quickly assess and repair damage following the typhoon. About 30 marine soldiers were placed on "Typhoon Watch". They were to ride out the storm at the Foster headquarters building until Tropical Cyclone Condition of Readiness-1 had been sounded. At that time, they were to survey the area for signs of damage.

=== South Korea ===
At least 300 flights in and out of South Korea were cancelled due to Typhoon Nari. About 130 of the cancelled flights were from Jeju Island. An additional 3,000 ferries were also cancelled from the island. Several ports along the southern coast of South Korea were shut down due to the storm. Typhoon warnings were issued for most of the southern regions of the country.

== Impact ==
=== Japan ===
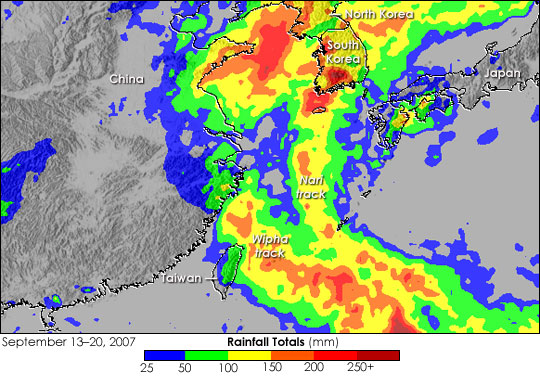
Estimated rainfall totals from Typhoons Nari and Wipha from September 13–20

Winds were recorded up to 101 km/h (63 mph) in the United States Marine base. Damage at the base was primarily limited to trees. The storm passed directly over Kumejima Island, producing a record 226 km/h (140 mph) wind gust on the island. A pressure of 948.4 hPa (mbar) was recorded as the eye passed over. This record was eclipsed less than two weeks later by Typhoon Wipha which produced a wind gust of 252 km/h (157 mph). Total precipitation in Okinawa was estimated to have reached 120 mm (4.7 in), with rainfall rates peaking at 45.5 mm (1.79 in) per hour. At least 4,500 residences were left without power throughout all the islands, most of which were on Kumejima. In Naha City, a wall collapsed due to the rain but caused no injuries. Cars were reportedly flipped over in Kumejima Town where the worst damage was dealt. Numerous buildings lost their windows and numerous trees were knocked down. The outer bands of Nari trigged flooding which killed three people and injured three others in Kyushu. Fourteen homes were destroyed, 22 were damaged, and 117 others were affected. A total of 1,247 hectares of farmland was either damaged or destroyed by the typhoon. At the height of the storm, 4,800 households were without power and 3,700 were without water. Damages from both prefectures amounted to ¥31.4 billion ($323 million USD).

=== South Korea ===
Throughout the country, a total of 479 structures were damaged or destroyed, displacing 948 people. The torrential rains submerged large areas of farmland and flooded roadways. The hardest hit area was Jeju Island, where rainfall amounted to a record 590 mm (23 in). At least 12 people were killed on the island and damages amounted to ₩28 billion ($19.2 million USD). In all, 20 people were killed and damages amounted to ₩65.2 billion (US$70 million).

== Aftermath ==
Following Typhoon Nari, Jeju Island was declared a national disaster area by the South Korean government. Residents who lost 30 percent or more of their property were entitled to a nine-month extension to their tax deadlines. The government reported that they would cover about 90 percent of the costs for rehabilitation on the island.

== See also ==
- Other tropical cyclones named Nari
- Other tropical cyclones named Falcon
- Typhoon Danas (2013)
- Typhoon Sanba (2012)
