= List of storms named Man-yi =

The name Man-yi (Cantonese: 萬宜, [maːn˨ jiː˨˩]) has been used for five tropical cyclones in the western North Pacific Ocean. The name was contributed by Hong Kong and refers to High Island Reservoir in Sai Kung Peninsula, which was originally a strait that separated the peninsula to High Island.

- Typhoon Man-yi (2001) (T0109, 12W) – Category 4 typhoon which stayed out to sea
- Typhoon Man-yi (2007) (T0704, 04W, Bebeng) – Category 4 super typhoon that struck Japan during July 2007
- Typhoon Man-yi (2013) (T1318, 16W) – struck Japan during September 2013; JTWC classified it as a Tropical Storm.
- Typhoon Man-yi (2018) (T1828, 34W, Tomas) – Category 2 typhoon that stayed out to sea
- Typhoon Man-yi (2024) (T2424, 25W, Pepito) – Category 5 super typhoon that made devastating landfalls in Dipaculao, Aurora and Panganiban, Catanduanes.

The name Man-yi was retired following the 2024 Pacific typhoon season and was replaced with Dim-sum (Cantonese: 點心, [tiːm˨˥ sɐm˥]), which refers to a large course of small dishes of dumplings and pastries in Cantonese cuisine.
