= Tropical Storm Meari (2011) =

Pacific severe tropical storm in 2011

Severe Tropical Storm Meari (Falcon)
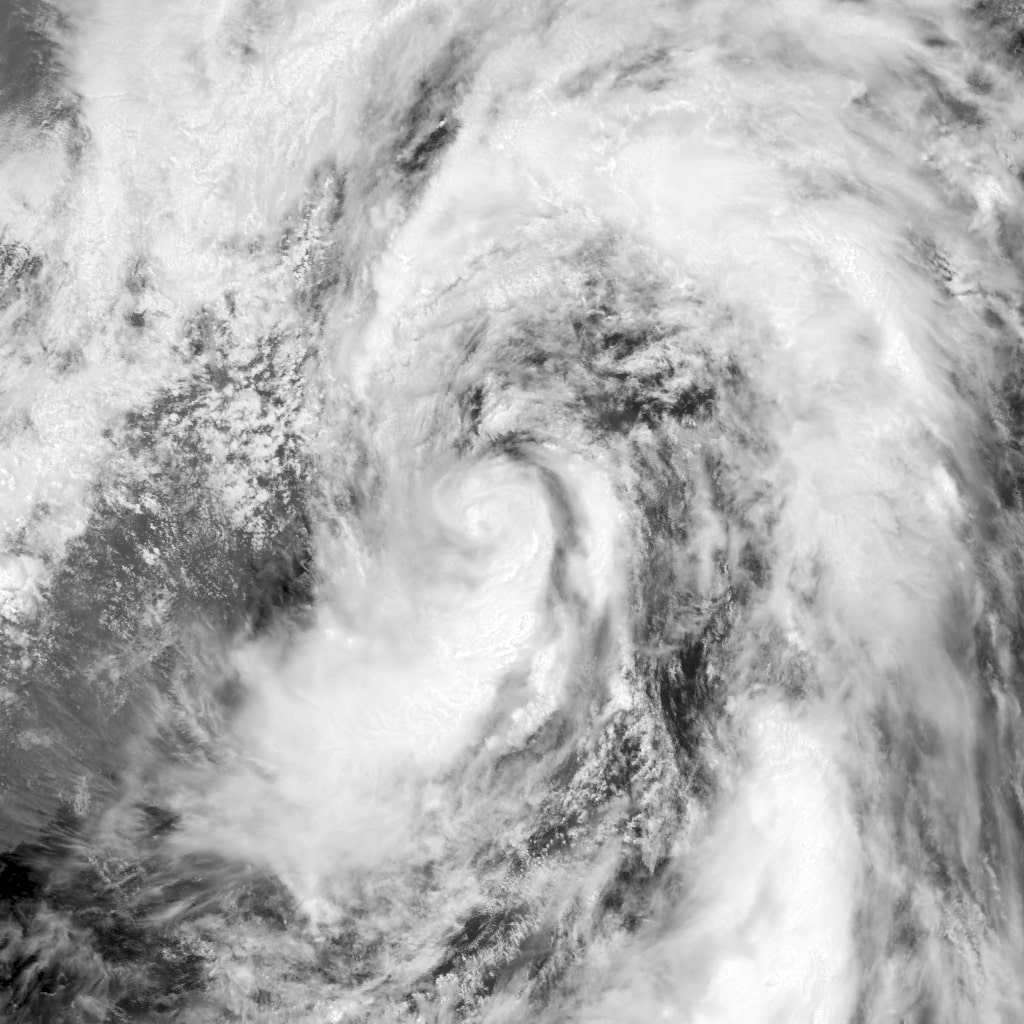
- Tropical Storm Meari off the east coast of China on June 25

Meteorological history
- Formed: June 20, 2011
- Dissipated: June 27, 2011

Severe tropical storm
- 10-minute sustained (JMA)
- Highest winds: 110 km/h (70 mph)
- Lowest pressure: 975 hPa (mbar); 28.79 inHg

Tropical storm
- 1-minute sustained (SSHWS/JTWC)
- Highest winds: 100 km/h (65 mph)
- Lowest pressure: 982 hPa (mbar); 29.00 inHg

Overall effects
- Fatalities: 17 (Note: Total does not include an unknown number of casualties in North Korea.)
- Missing: 15
- Damage: $47 million (2011 USD)
- Areas affected: Philippines, Taiwan, Ryukyu Islands, South Korea, North Korea
- IBTrACS
- Part of the 2011 Pacific typhoon season

Severe Tropical Storm Meari, known in the Philippines as Severe Tropical Storm Falcon, was an unusually large tropical cyclone that caused significant damage from the Philippines to the Korean Peninsula in late-June 2011.

== Meteorological history ==
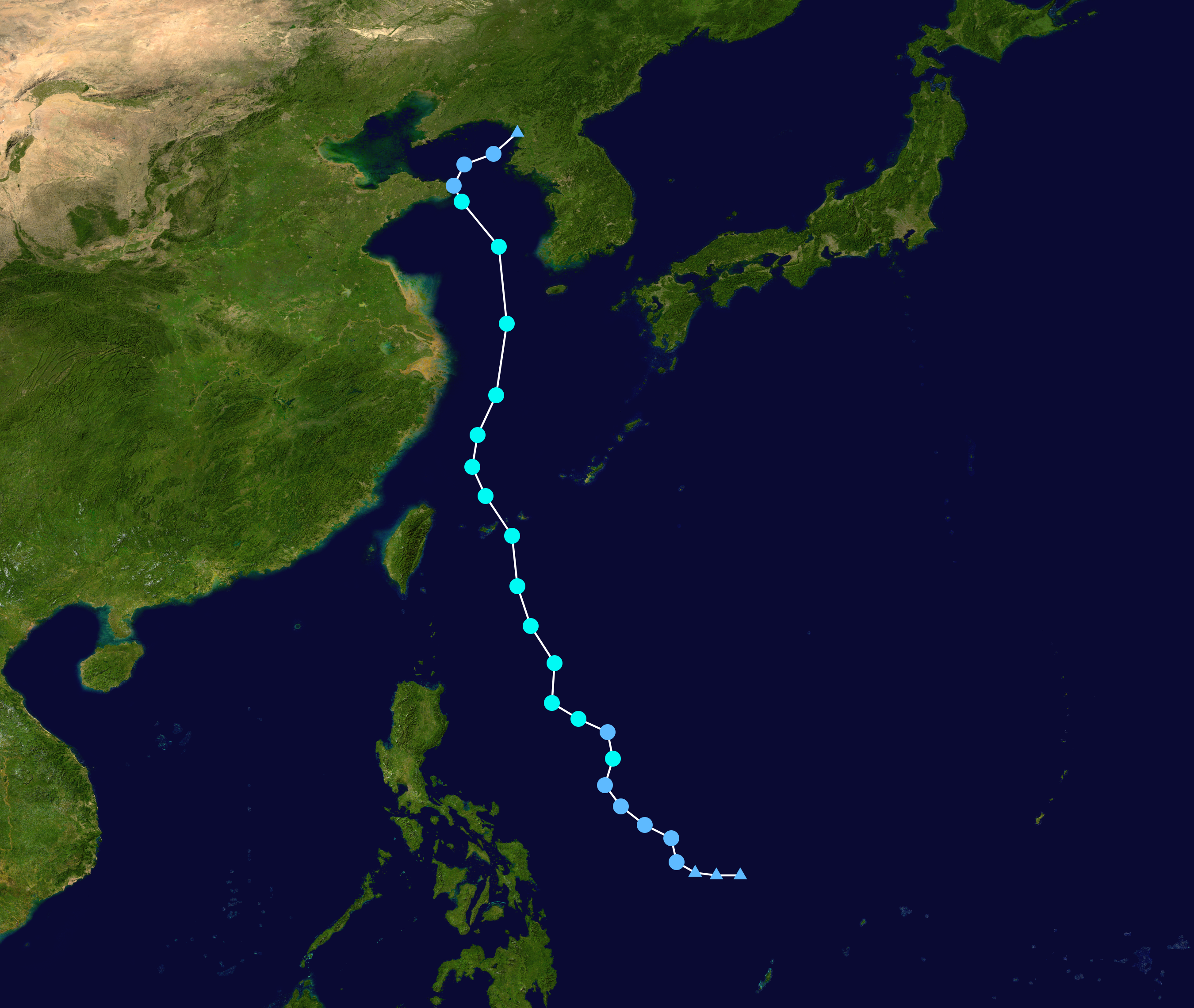
Map plotting the storm's track and intensity, according to the Saffir–Simpson scale Map key Saffir–Simpson scale Tropical depression (≤38 mph, ≤62 km/h) Tropical storm (39–73 mph, 63–118 km/h) Category 1 (74–95 mph, 119–153 km/h) Category 2 (96–110 mph, 154–177 km/h) Category 3 (111–129 mph, 178–208 km/h) Category 4 (130–156 mph, 209–251 km/h) Category 5 (≥157 mph, ≥252 km/h) Unknown Storm type Tropical cyclone Subtropical cyclone Extratropical cyclone, remnant low, tropical disturbance, or monsoon depression

On June 16, a large, disorganized area of showers and thunderstorms developed in association with a weak area of low pressure well to the southeast of Yap. Gradually, the disturbance became more organized as it moved through an area of moderate wind shear, high sea surface temperatures (estimated at 29 to 30 °C (84 to 86 °F) by satellites) and favorable diffluence. Further development of the low prompted the Joint Typhoon Warning Center (JTWC) to issue a Tropical Cyclone Formation Alert on June 20. Around 1800 UTC, the Japan Meteorological Agency (JMA) declared the system as a tropical depression. At this time, the depression was located roughly 405 km (250 mi) northwest of Palau. Tracking steadily northwestward in response to a ridge to the northeast, the depression crossed west of 135°E on June 21 and entered the Philippine Atmospheric, Geophysical and Astronomical Services Administration's (PAGASA) area of responsibility. The storm was subsequently assigned the local name Falcon by PAGASA. Throughout the day, convection around the center of the depression increased and developed defined banding features along the storm's periphery. Aided by a tropical upper tropospheric trough to the east, outflow improved around the circulation.

A large system, roughly 1,480 km (920 mi) wide, convection was slow to consolidate over the center which remained mostly cloud free. Microwave satellite imagery indicated that the system lacked strong inflow, leading to a disorganized structure. Due to its large size, slow intensification was expected over the following several days as the storm tracked generally northwestward towards Taiwan. Early on June 22, the depression intensified into a tropical storm, at which time the JMA assigned it the name Meari. (Note: The name Meari (Korean: 메아리, [me̞a̠ɾi]) was contributed by North Korea and means echo in Korean.) Around the time it was upgraded, the storm had grown to a size that covered nearly the entire Philippine Sea. By June 23, convection began consolidating near the storm's center, indicating that the storm was intensifying. The following day, the JMA estimated that Meari strengthened to a severe tropical storm, with maximum sustained winds around 95 km/h (60 mph). Later that day, the storm's expansive windfield began to contract as an upper-level trough near Taiwan impinged on the western edge of Meari. Though the storm's overall structure degraded somewhat, surface observations continued to show intensification with a meteorological station on Shimojishima reporting winds of 124 km/h (77 mph).

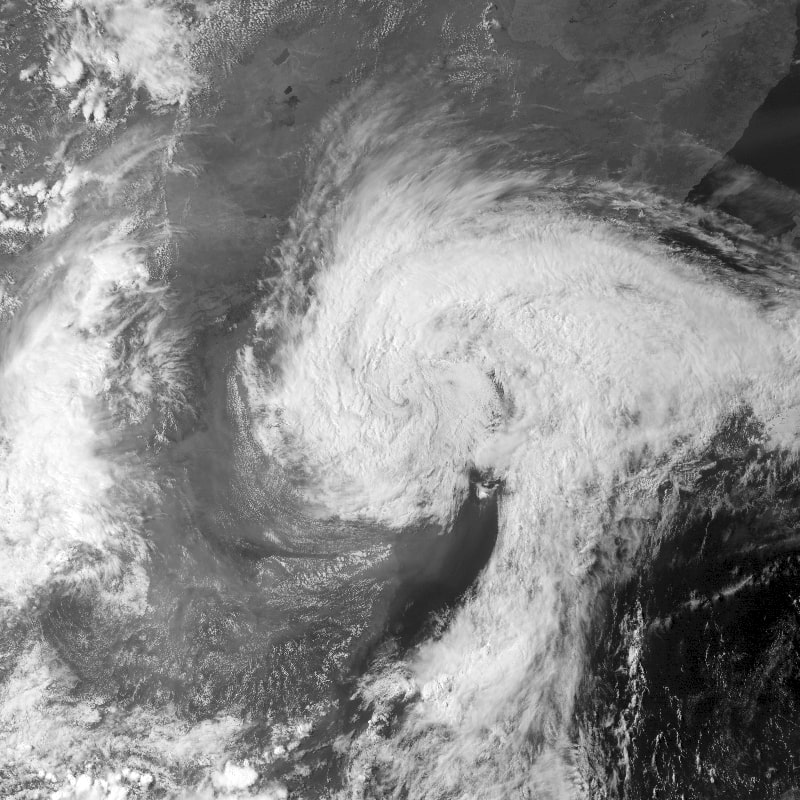
Tropical Storm Meari near landfall in northeastern China on June 26

Late on June 24, Tropical Storm Meari is estimated to have attained its peak intensity with winds around 110 km/h (70 mph) and a barometric pressure of 975 mbar (hPa; 28.79 inHg). Situated northeast of Taiwan, the storm turned northward due to a blocking ridge over Manchuria, China. By this time, the storm moved out of PAGASA's area of responsibility and the agency issued their final advisory. Throughout June 25, Meari's structure rapidly degraded as an approaching trough produced major subsidence over the northwestern portion of the storm. Situated between a subtropical ridge to the east and a trough to the west, the storm rapidly accelerated northward towards the Korean Peninsula. During this time, the system crossed over significantly cooler waters and alongside the subsidence, convection struggled to develop. Once over the East China Sea on June 26, the vertical structure of Meari significantly degraded, leaving only a surface low. In light of this, the storm turned back towards the northwest, again threatening China. Void of convection due to shear from the mid-latitude Westerlies, the weakened system soon made landfall along the Shandong Peninsula. After remaining near the peninsula for several hours, Meari rapidly accelerated towards the northeast and began taking on characteristics of an extratropical cyclone. Early on June 27, the storm completed the transition into an extratropical system hours before striking North Korea near the city of Anju with winds of 85 km/h (50 mph). Hours after moving onshore, the storm rapidly dissipated and was last noted around 1200 UTC.

== Preparations ==
=== Philippines ===
Following the first advisory on Tropical Depression Falcon by PAGASA on June 21, emergency management officials in the Philippines began taking precautions for potential damage. Severe weather bulletins and flood advisories were issued for much of the country as a large rainband established itself. In Cagayan Valley, the Philippine Army and Navy were placed on alert status for possible assistance in evacuation orders. By June 22, Public Storm Warning Signal One was raised for much of the Bicol Region. In some areas, schools were closed due to inclement weather. Additionally, the National Disaster Risk Reduction and Management Council prepositioned relief funds to be distributed once the storm passed. Off the coast of the Bicol Region, a no sailing advisory was issued to all vessels after seven fishermen went missing.

Continued rains across the country prompted evacuation orders on June 24 for more than 48,000 people. Numerous schools closed due to dangerous travel conditions. In order to prevent failure, several dams began opening gates and releasing excess water. Multiple emergency management agencies across the country stockpiled resources and placed relief teams on standby to quickly assist residents affected by the storm.

=== South Korea ===
On June 25, meteorologists and local media in South Korea began warning residents of the approaching storm. The main concern was for heavy, flooding rains falling at rates up to 30 mm (1.2 in) per hour with even heavier amounts in the mountains. In order to prevent contamination of rivers, the government announced that it would closely monitor the 113 disposal sites near streams or on slopes. Offshore, large swells of 7 to 8 m (23 to 26 ft) were expected. Across the country, 46 flights were canceled and 118 ships were ordered to remain at port. Typhoon warnings were raised for much of the country, mainly northern provinces, and storm warnings were issued for southern provinces.

== Impact ==
=== Philippines ===
Due to the large size of Meari, heavy rains associated with the storm fell across much of the Philippines starting on June 22 due to the southwest monsoon enhanced by the said storm. Within two days, parts of Metro Manila were submerged in up to 1.5 m (4.9 ft) of water and multiple dams neared their critical or spill level. In all, 12 people were killed, 4 people were injured, and 12 others went missing in country, and Meari caused a loss of Php647 million (US$14.9 million).

=== China ===
Striking the Shandong Peninsula on June 26, Tropical Storm Meari produced winds up to 83 km/h (52 mph) across parts of the region. Portions of Shandong, Liaoning and Jilin Provinces were affected by heavy rains for much of the day.

=== Korean Peninsula ===
Bringing torrential rains to much of the Korean Peninsula, Meari caused widespread flooding in the region. Following on the heels of several days of rain, Meari contributed to a record period of six consecutive days of rain in Seoul. The heaviest rains fell in northern portions of the country, peaking at 374 mm (14.7 in) in Boeun. In Seoul, 121 mm (4.8 in) of rain fell during the storm. Along the Nakdong River in North Gyeongsang, a 100 m (330 ft) section of bridge in Chilgok, built in honor of soldiers killed during the Korean War, collapsed. More than 10 km (6.2 mi) of road was washed away due to the storm. High winds in Jeju-do downed several tree limbs and power lines, leaving 9,861 households without power. At least nine people were killed in South Korea while another three were listed as missing. Of these fatalities, two resulted from rescuers being swept away while searching for people reported missing in flooded areas. In one incident, five people died after their car was swept away by an overflowing river. Overall, damage from the storm reached 28 billion won ($24.8 million USD).

Heavy rains also affected much of North Korea, worsening ongoing floods. The highest known rainfall total was 105 mm (4.1 in) in Hoeyang, though rain was still falling at the time of the reported amount. The heaviest damage occurred in Kangwon-do, North Hwanghae and South Hwanghae provinces where about 160 blocks of structures were destroyed. According to the country's prime minister, the combined effects of Meari and floods in July killed dozens of people and injured many more. An estimated 2,900 homes were destroyed and 60,000 hectares (148,200 acres) of farmland was submerged or washed away. Overall, approximately 8,000 people were left homeless. Coastal areas of both nations experience large waves.

== Aftermath ==
=== Philippines ===
Across the affected regions of the Philippines, more than 170,000 people were evacuated after the storm due to flooding. With many residents stranded by flood waters, multiple branches of the Philippine military provided rescue vehicles, such as trucks and rubber boats, to local authorities. Emergency operations were in full force shortly after the storm passed and relief distribution began by early July. Nearly Php31 million (US$716 thousand) worth of supplies was provided to affected residents. Several thousand sacks of rice previously stockpiled by disaster relief organizations and the military were distributed across the country. By June 28, the Government of the Philippines declared a state of calamity for the Province of Pampanga, Camiling, Paniqui, Concepcion, La Paz, San Clemente and San Mateo. In San Mateo, the Philippine Navy deployed a team of 198 soldiers to assist in evacuation efforts.

=== Korean Peninsula ===
In the wake of widespread flooding, South Korean President Lee Myung-bak expressed his sadness over the loss of life from Meari.

By early August, the Government of North Korea began a relief operation to assist residents affected by the July floods and Tropical Storm Meari. Food, drinking water, utensils, clothing and necessities were distributed in the hardest hit regions in South Hwanghae Province. Building supplies were also sent to initiate reconstruction. For the first time since the ROKS Cheonan sinking in March 2010, South Korea offered emergency aid to North Korea. The proposed aid included 5 billion won ($4.7 million USD) worth of quilts, medicine, instant noodles and healthy meals; however, the request made by the North Korean government was for rice and cement. By early October, the proposed aid effort was abandoned due to the disagreement.

== See also ==
- Other tropical cyclones named Meari
- Other tropical cyclones named Falcon
