= List of storms named Fitow =

The name Fitow (Yapese: fitöw, [fɪtœw]) has been used for three tropical cyclones in the Western Pacific Ocean. The name was contributed by the Federated States of Micronesia and refers to a type of flower (Calophyllum inophyllum) in Yapese.

- Tropical Storm Fitow (2001) (T0114, 18W) – struck Hainan island and mainland China, killing 4.
- Typhoon Fitow (2007) (T0709, 10W) – struck Japan, killing at least 2.
- Typhoon Fitow (2013) (T1323, 22W, Quedan) – damaging typhoon that struck China at Fuding in Fujian province.

The name Fitow was retired following the 2013 Pacific typhoon season and was replaced with Mun.
