= Funagira Dam =

Dam in Shizuoka Prefecture, Japan

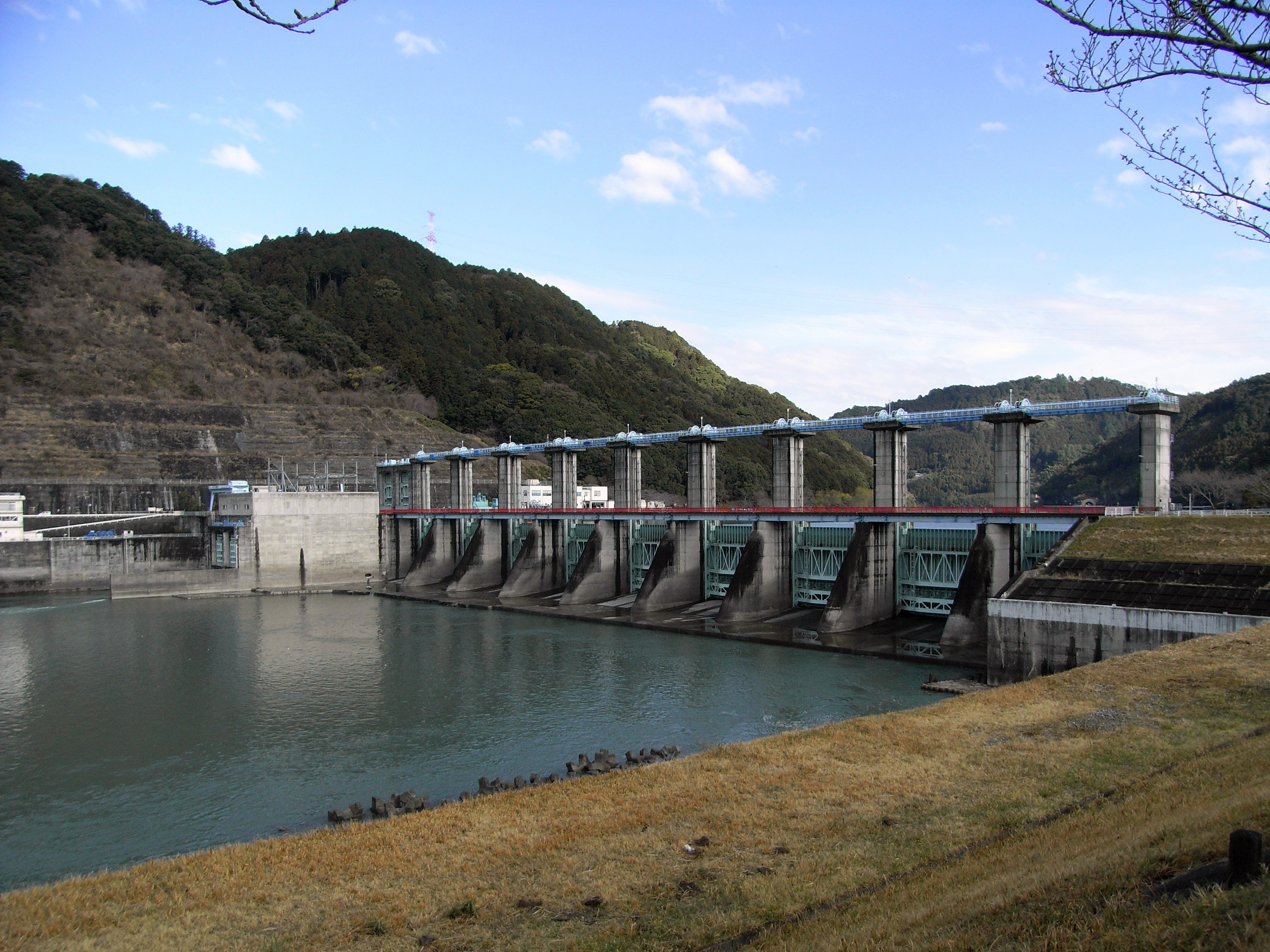
- Interactive map of Funagira Dam
- Official name: 船明ダム
- Location: Shizuoka Prefecture, Japan
- Coordinates: 34°53′26″N 137°48′54″E
- Construction began: 1972
- Opening date: 1977
- Operator: Electric Power Development Company

Dam and spillways
- Type of dam: Gravity
- Impounds: Tenryū River
- Height: 24 m (79 ft)
- Length: 221 m (725 ft)

Reservoir
- Creates: Funagira Reservoir
- Total capacity: 10,900,000 m^{3} (380,000,000 cu ft)
- Catchment area: 4,895 km^{2} (1,890 sq mi)
- Surface area: 190 ha (470 acres)

The Funagira Dam (船明ダム, Funagira damu) is a dam on the Tenryū River, located in Tenryū district, Hamamatsu city, Shizuoka Prefecture on the island of Honshū, Japan.

== History ==
The potential of the Tenryū River valley for hydroelectric power development was realized by the Taishō period Japanese government in the early 20th century. The Tenryū River was characterized by a high volume of flow and a fast current. Its mountainous upper reaches and tributaries were areas of steep valleys and abundant rainfall, and were sparsely populated, and the Tenryū River’s propensity for flooding made flood control a priority. By the late 1960s, numerous dams had been constructed on the river’s upper and middle reaches and on several of its tributaries.

The Funagira Dam was the last major dam to be completed on the Tenryū River, and was built only 30 kilometers from the river mouth at the piedmont point of the river. Construction work began on the Funagira Dam in 1972 and was completed by 1977 by a consortium of the Kumagaya-gumi and Nishimatsu Construction.

== Design ==
The Funagira Dam is a hollow-core concrete gravity dam with several central spillways. It supplies water to the nearby Funagira Hydroelectric Power Station, with a rated capacity of 32,000 kW.

== Surroundings ==
The Funagira Dam Reservoir is a popular attraction for canoeing and camping, due to its proximity to downtown Hamamatsu.

== See also ==
- List of dams and reservoirs in Japan
