= Ochiai Station =

Ochiai Station (落合駅) is the name of two train stations in Japan:

- Ochiai Station (Hokkaido)
- Ochiai Station (Tokyo)
