= List of storms named Danas =

The name Danas (Tagalog: danas, [ˈdaː.nɐs]) has been used for five tropical cyclones in the western North Pacific Ocean. The name was contributed by the Philippines and means "living, experiencing through an event" in Tagalog.

- Typhoon Danas (2001) (T0115, 19W) – interacted with Typhoon Nari and later struck Japan.
- Severe Tropical Storm Danas (2007) (T0710, 11W) – high waves injured two people in Japan.
- Typhoon Danas (2013) (T1324, 23W, Ramil) – Category 4 typhoon, which struck the Ryukyu Islands and Japan.
- Tropical Storm Danas (2019) (T1905, 06W, Falcon) – struck South Korea as a tropical depression.
- Typhoon Danas (2025) (T2504, 05W, Bising) – a Category 4-equivalent typhoon that struck West Taiwan and China.

Preceded by Mun	Pacific typhoon season names Danas	Succeeded by Nari

== See also ==
- Cyclone Dana (2024), a similarly-named cyclone in the North Indian Ocean
