= Typhoon Man-yi (2013) =

Pacific typhoon in 2013

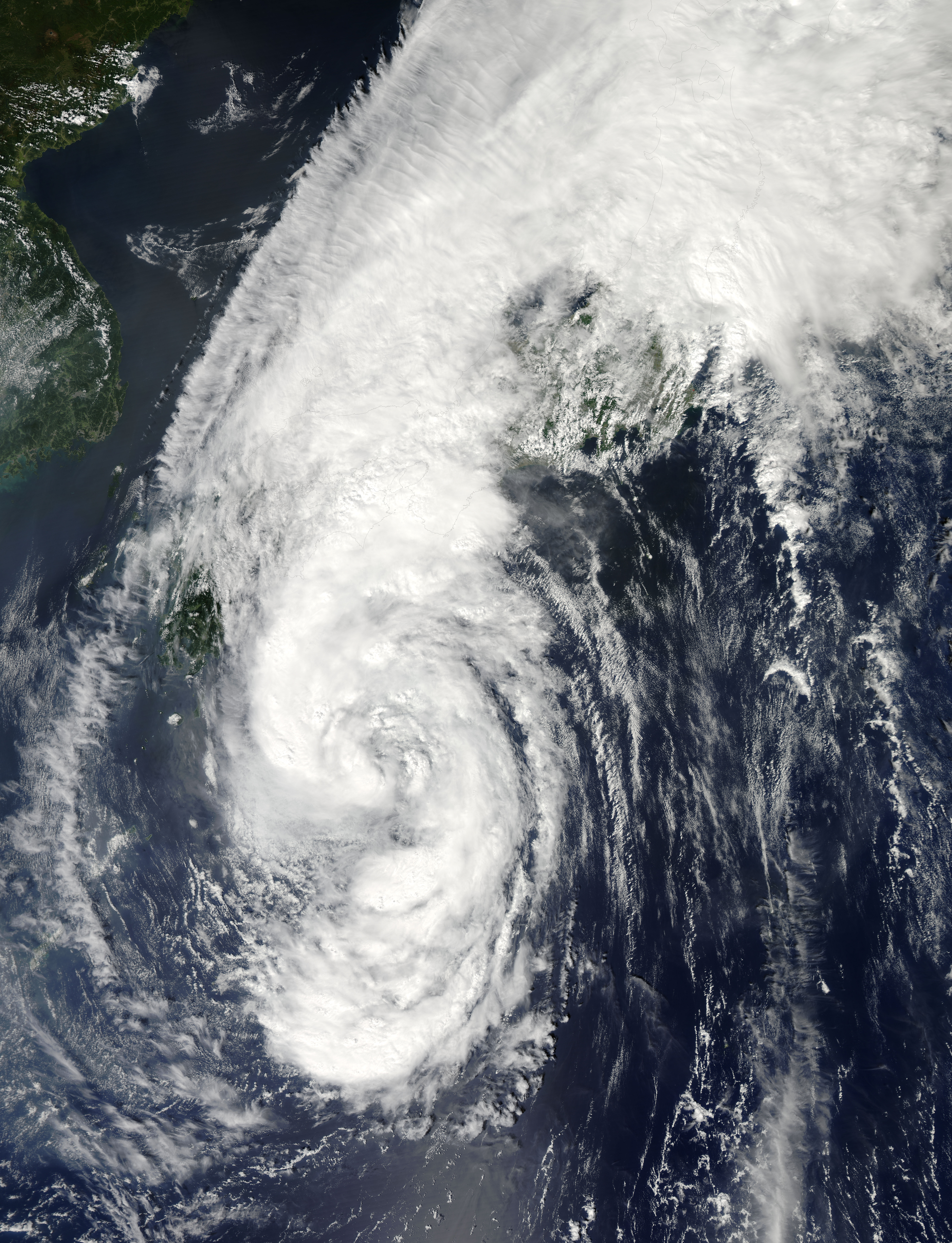
- Typhoon Man-yi approaching Japan on September 15

Meteorological history
- Formed: September 11, 2013
- Extratropical: September 16, 2013
- Dissipated: September 20, 2013

Typhoon
- 10-minute sustained (JMA)
- Highest winds: 120 km/h (75 mph)
- Lowest pressure: 960 hPa (mbar); 28.35 inHg

Tropical storm
- 1-minute sustained (SSHWS/JTWC)
- Highest winds: 110 km/h (70 mph)
- Lowest pressure: 978 hPa (mbar); 28.88 inHg

Overall effects
- Fatalities: 6 total
- Damage: $1.62 billion (2013 USD)
- Areas affected: Japan
- IBTrACS
- Part of the 2013 Pacific typhoon season

Typhoon Man-yi was a very severe storm that brought very strong winds and flash floods to Japan during mid-September. The third typhoon of the 2013 Pacific typhoon season, Man-yi was identified on September 10. It became a storm on September 12 and reached peak intensity on September 15. Japan was then experiencing winds above 30 knots. Typhoon Man-yi became extratropical on September 16 and fully dissipated late on September 20 in the Kamchatka Peninsula region, bringing strong winds until September 25.

== Meteorological history ==
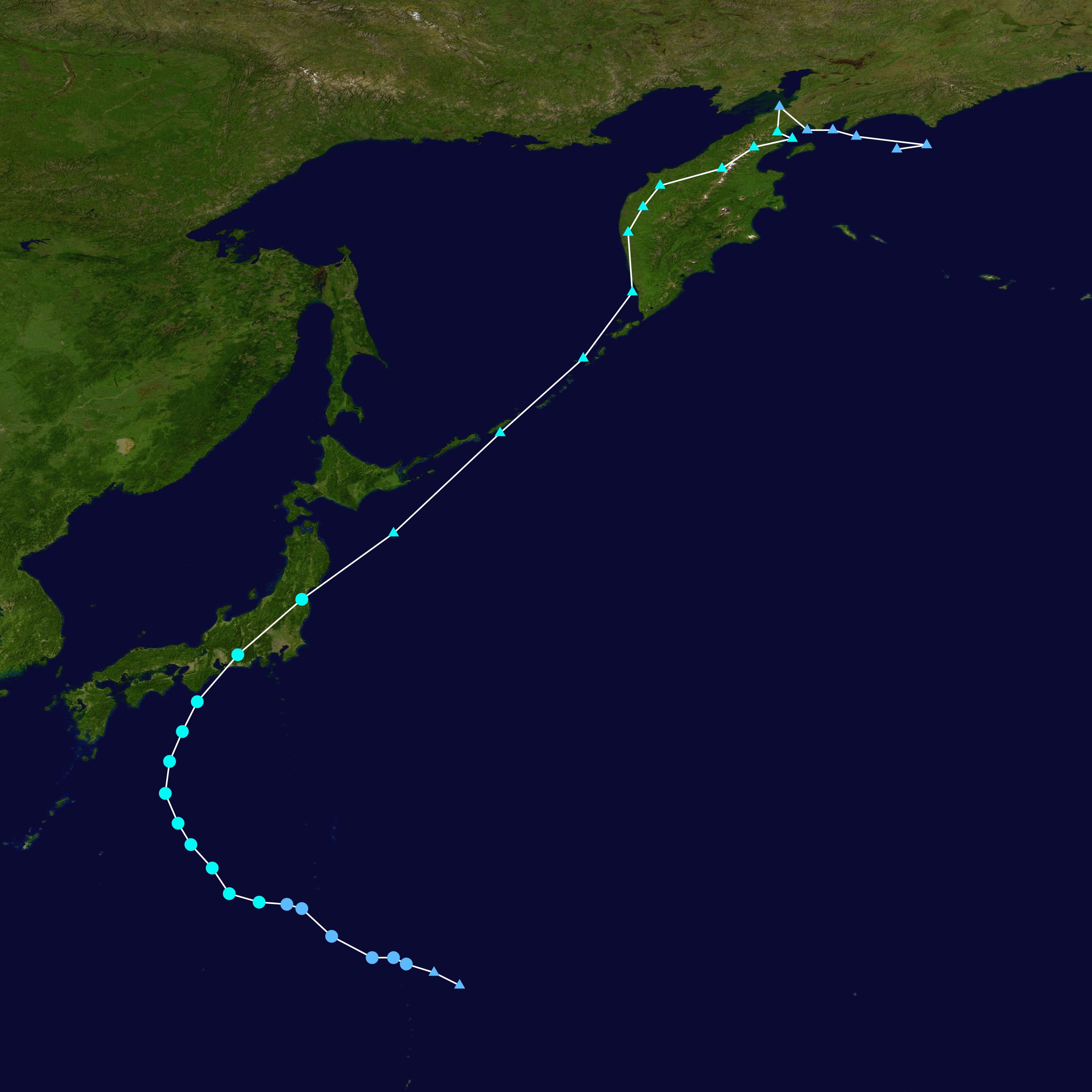
Map plotting the storm's track and intensity, according to the Saffir–Simpson scale Map key Saffir–Simpson scale Tropical depression (≤38 mph, ≤62 km/h) Tropical storm (39–73 mph, 63–118 km/h) Category 1 (74–95 mph, 119–153 km/h) Category 2 (96–110 mph, 154–177 km/h) Category 3 (111–129 mph, 178–208 km/h) Category 4 (130–156 mph, 209–251 km/h) Category 5 (≥157 mph, ≥252 km/h) Unknown Storm type Tropical cyclone Subtropical cyclone Extratropical cyclone, remnant low, tropical disturbance, or monsoon depression

A large disturbance formed near the Northern Mariana Islands late on September 9. Late on September 11, the JMA reported that the disturbance intensified to a tropical depression had developed about 565 km (350 mi) to the northeast of Saipan, in the Northern Mariana Islands. It was designated as 16W by the JTWC and JMA upgraded to a tropical storm naming it Man-yi on September 13, (Note: The name Man-yi (Cantonese: 萬宜, [maːn˨ jiː˨˩]) was contributed by Hong Kong and refers to High Island Reservoir in Cantonese.) moving north then west on September 13. Man-yi still started intensifying and grew larger more later that day as it dropped a pressure of 20 millibars.

Late on September 14, Man-yi became a severe tropical storm, absorbing few dry air and making a small unbalanced eye. Man-yi started moving towards Japan making more strong winds to Japan on September 15 and made landfall on September 16 near Toyohashi, Aichi Prefecture.

== Preparations and impact ==
During September 14, as winds started to get stronger, evacuations were ordered to many places. In Kyoto, 268,000 residences were ordered to leave and about 81,000 in Fukuchiyama.

In Kyoto on September 16, 260,000 people in the city were ordered to evacuate to shelters. Hundreds of thousands of others were also ordered to evacuate across mainly the west side of Japan. The JMA issued a “special warning” for three western Japan prefectures of Fukui, Kyoto, and Shiga. Over 70 people were injured and at least one person was killed. The government of Japan set up emergency task forces and employed rescue teams. Many homes were flooded and about 80,000 were without electricity in western and central Japan. Trains in Tokyo and its vicinity were mostly suspended and hundreds of flights were grounded.

The storm made its first landfall in Toyohashi, Aichi Prefecture in 08:00am on September 15 as 2 people were reported dead and 6 missing. During the morning hours of September 16, another 4 people were dead by falling trees, landslides and flashfloods. According to the Japan Meteorological Agency, precipitation in the 48 hours through Monday morning reached about 300 mm in parts of the cities of Kyoto and Otsu — more than they usually get for the entire month. Precipitation topped 500 mm in parts of Mie and Nara, the agency said. In Osaka, about 290,000 residents in the city's harbor area were forced to flee early Monday. Although the evacuation order was lifted that afternoon, officials warned that the raging river currents were still dangerous.

Severe thunderstorms associated with the typhoon resulted in a localized tornado outbreak with nine tornadoes touching down; none of these exceeded F1 intensity.

Typhoon Man-yi caused extensive damage across Japan, with losses reaching ¥160 billion (US$1.62 billion).

== See also ==
- Other tropical cyclones named Man-yi
- Typhoon Tokage (2004)
- Typhoon Wipha (2013)
- Typhoon Mindulle (2016)
