= Typhoon Fitow (2007) =

Pacific typhoon in 2007

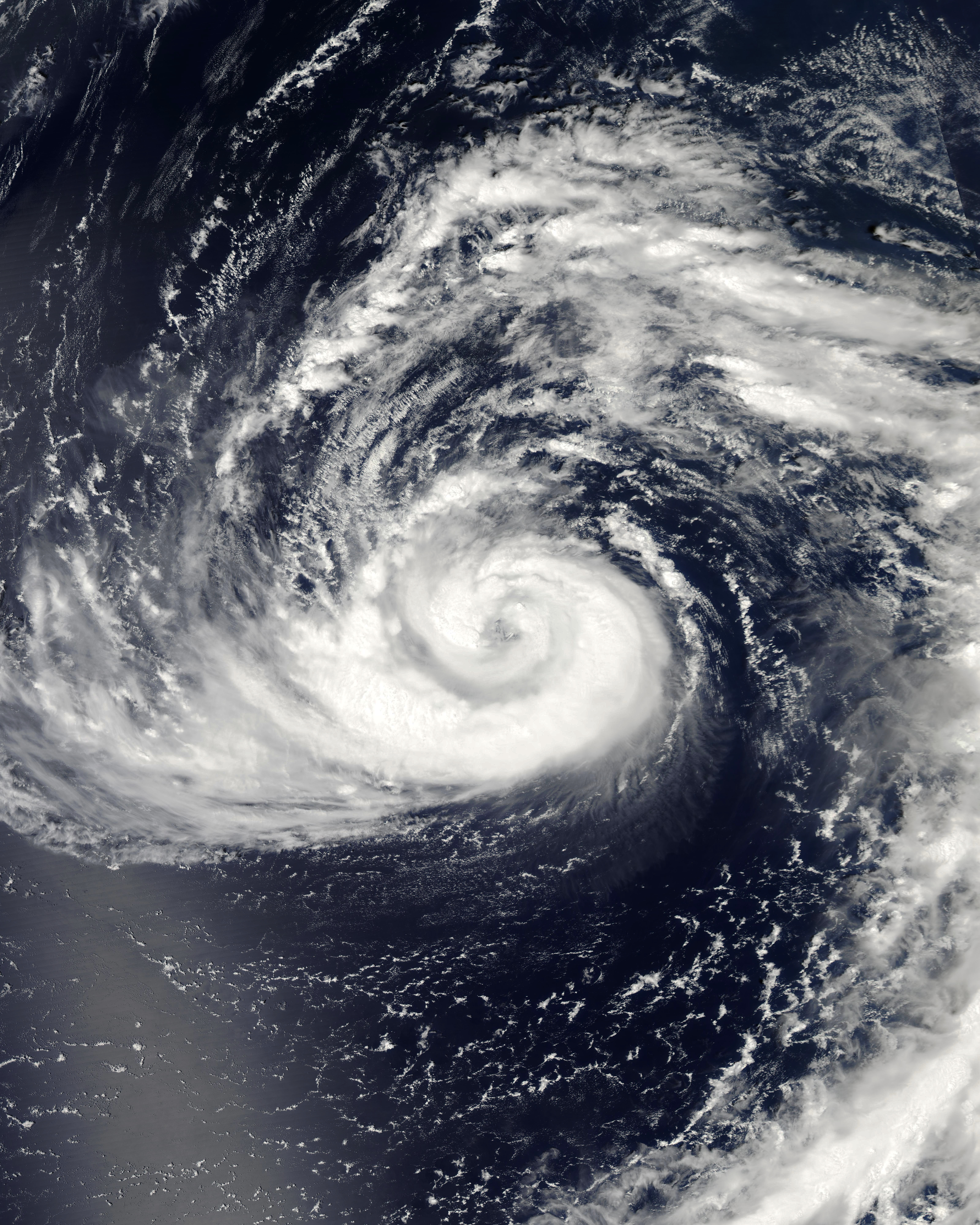
- Typhoon Fitow at peak intensity on August 31

Meteorological history
- Formed: August 26, 2007
- Extratropical: September 8, 2007
- Dissipated: September 11, 2007

Typhoon
- 10-minute sustained (JMA)
- Highest winds: 130 km/h (80 mph)
- Lowest pressure: 965 hPa (mbar); 28.50 inHg

Category 1-equivalent typhoon
- 1-minute sustained (SSHWS/JTWC)
- Highest winds: 150 km/h (90 mph)
- Lowest pressure: 963 hPa (mbar); 28.44 inHg

Overall effects
- Fatalities: 3 direct
- Damage: $1 billion (2007 USD)
- Areas affected: Japan and Russian Far East
- IBTrACS
- Part of the 2007 Pacific typhoon season

Typhoon Fitow (Note: The name Fitow (Yapese: fitöw, [fɪtœw]) was contributed by the Federated States of Micronesia and is the name of a flower (Calophyllum inophyllum) in Yapese.) was the ninth named tropical storm of the 2007 Pacific typhoon season that made landfall in Japan during early September. At its peak, it was thought to have been a minimal Category 2 typhoon by the JTWC, but was, in post-storm analysis, downgraded to a Category 1-equivalent typhoon by the Joint Typhoon Warning Center. The typhoon killed at least 2 people in Tokyo and was the first typhoon to hit the city since Typhoon Mawar in 2005. Damage from Fitow totaled to around $1 billion (2007 USD).

== Meteorological history ==
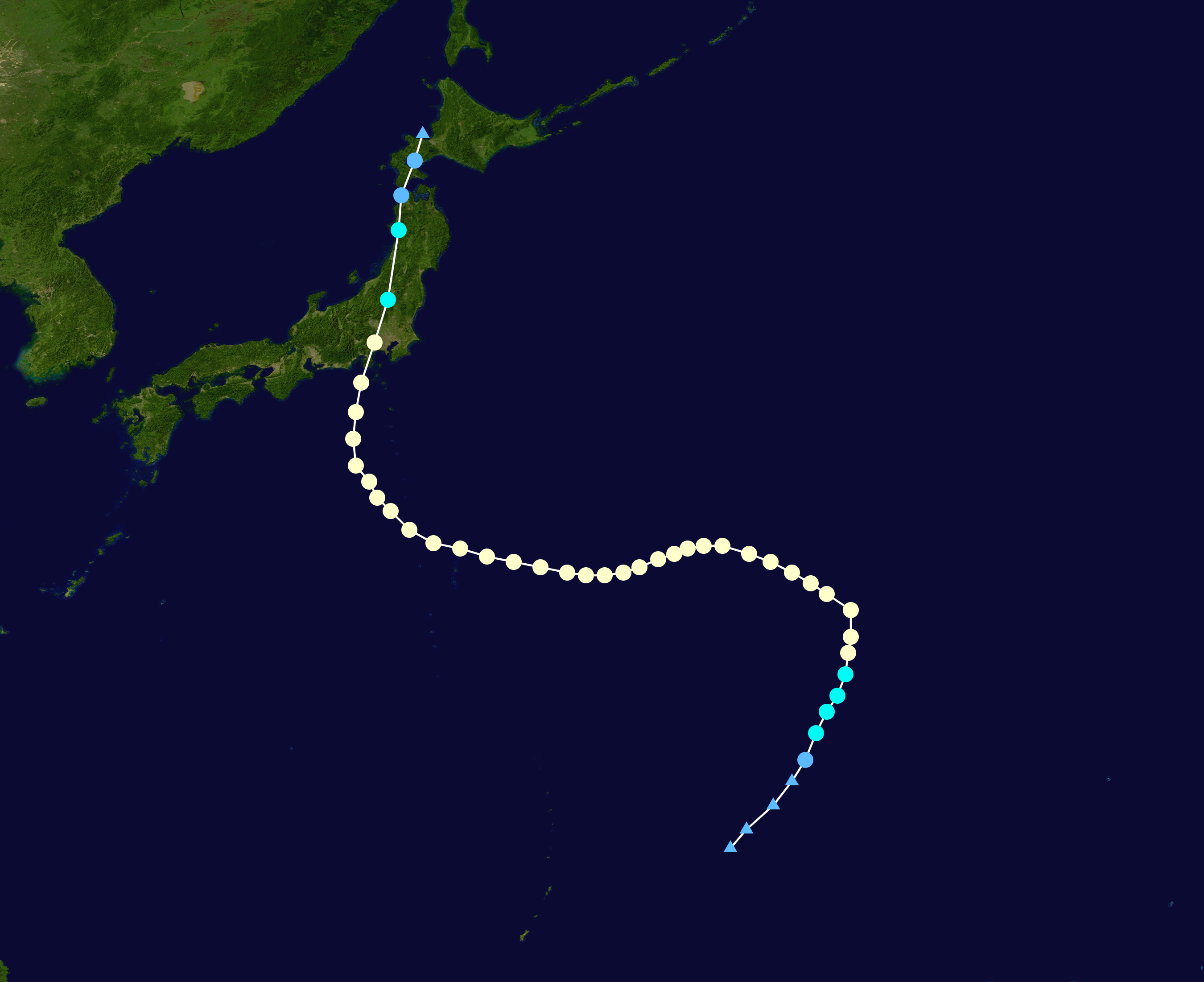
Map plotting the storm's track and intensity, according to the Saffir–Simpson scale Map key Saffir–Simpson scale Tropical depression (≤38 mph, ≤62 km/h) Tropical storm (39–73 mph, 63–118 km/h) Category 1 (74–95 mph, 119–153 km/h) Category 2 (96–110 mph, 154–177 km/h) Category 3 (111–129 mph, 178–208 km/h) Category 4 (130–156 mph, 209–251 km/h) Category 5 (≥157 mph, ≥252 km/h) Unknown Storm type Tropical cyclone Subtropical cyclone Extratropical cyclone, remnant low, tropical disturbance, or monsoon depression

On August 26 a Tropical disturbance developed in the Western Pacific Ocean to the northeast of Saipan and was designated as a minor tropical depression by the Japan Meteorological Agency early that day. The next day the Joint Typhoon Warning Center assessed the disturbances chances of forming, into a significant tropical cyclone within 24 hours as poor. On August 27 the JTWC reassessed the disturbances chances of forming into a significant tropical cyclone within 24 hours as fair and then later that day upgraded the disturbances chances of forming into a significant tropical cyclone as good and issued a tropical cyclone formation alert.

Later that day The JTWC began issuing warnings on Tropical Depression 10W, The next morning the system intensified quickly, under favourable conditions, becoming Tropical Storm Fitow that morning and then a severe tropical storm by the afternoon of August 29.

Late on the August 29, the JTWC upgraded Fitow to a typhoon. "Due to rapid intensification of the system", which had continued to consolidate. However it was not designated as a Typhoon by the JMA until August 30 Fitow then maintained Typhoon intensity with peak 10 minute wind speeds of 65 knots (120 km/h) until late on September 1 where it weakened into a severe tropical storm with wind speeds of 60 knots (110 km/h) it then Re-strengthened into a typhoon on September 5. Then late on the September 6 Typhoon Fitow made landfall on the Izu Peninsula with winds gusting to 65 knots (75 mph; 120 km/h) winds. Early the next day, JMA downgraded Fitow to a severe tropical storm. The JTWC released their final advisory on the system due to Fitow undergoing extratropical transition. The JMA then downgraded Fitow to a tropical storm, eventually dissipating on the 8th.

== Preparations ==
In Japan Flood Warnings and Evacuation Orders were issued from the west of Tokyo to the Tama River. At least 140 flights in and out of Japan were cancelled, stranding over 30,000 passengers. Several oil companies halted shipping due to Fitow. Bullet train services were also cancelled. A total of 223 flights were cancelled due to the storm, stranding over 36,000 people.

== Impact ==
=== Japan ===
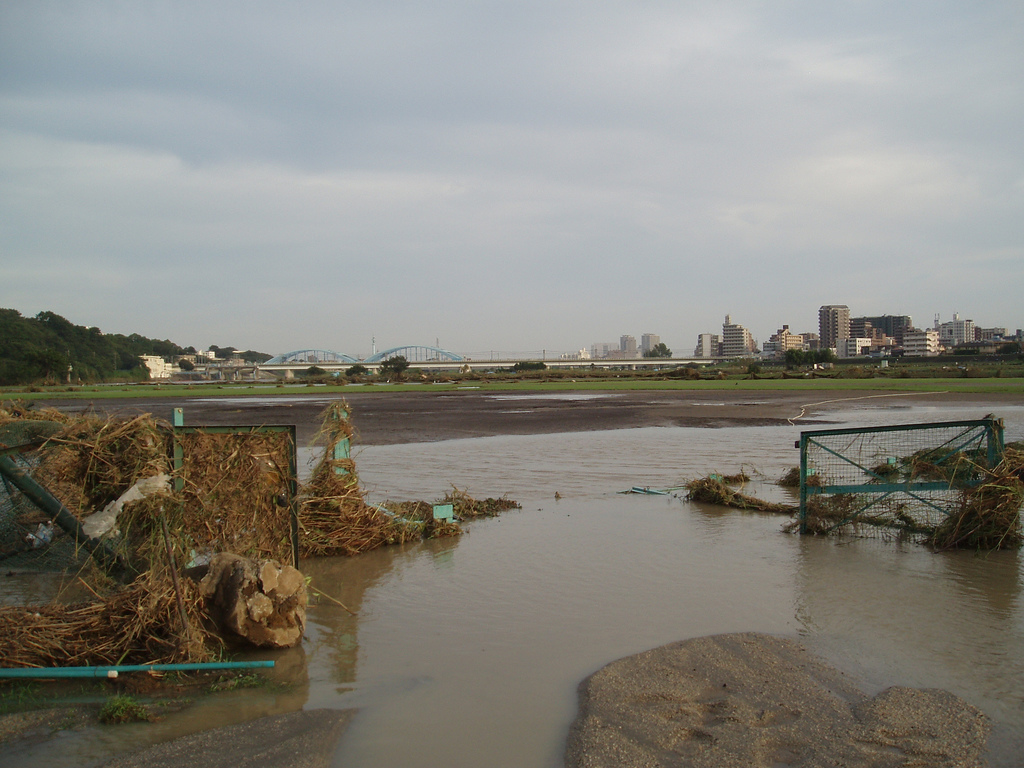
Flood damage from Typhoon Fitow along the Tama River flood plain

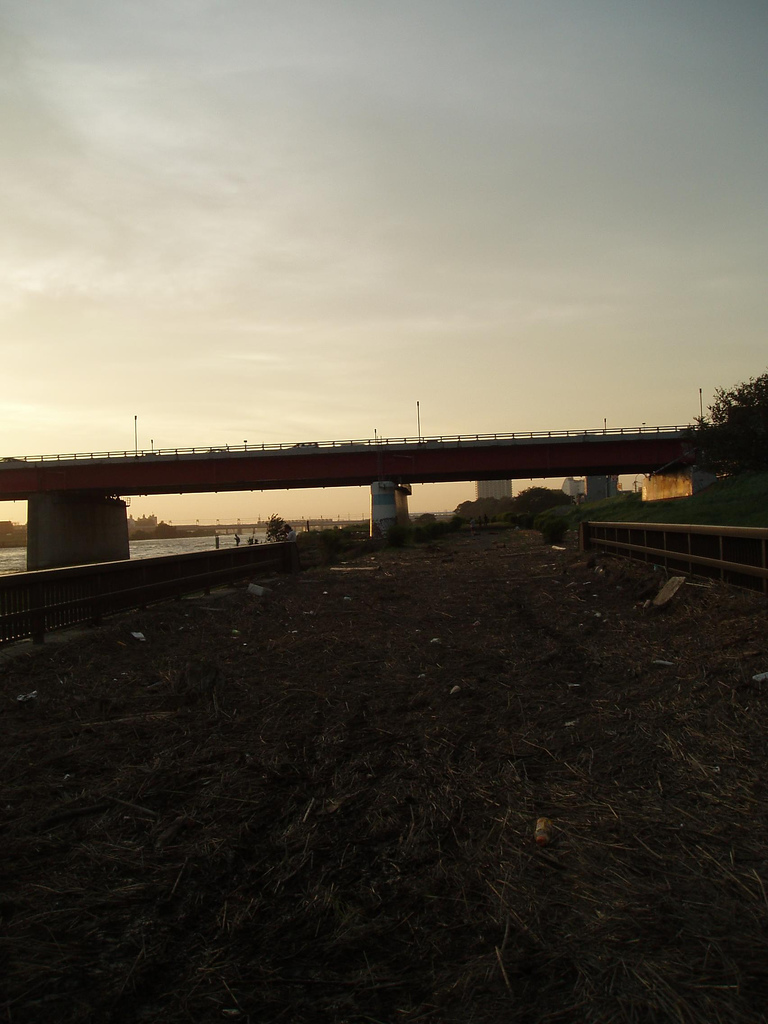
Bamboo covering a bridge following flooding from Typhoon Fitow

The water level of the Tama River exceeded dangerous level because of the heavy rain by Typhoon Fitow. Rainfall rates peaked at 66 mm/h (2.5 in/h) in Miyagi Prefecture and the highest accumulation was 694 mm (27.3 in) in Tokyo. Twenty-nine people were rescued from sandbanks on the Tama River on September 7 after the storm impacted Japan with powerful winds and heavy rain. At least 80,000 people were left without power as high winds from Fitow knocked down power lines. A 76-year-old man was killed when a tree limb fell on him. Several homes were reportedly destroyed by the typhoon. Three people were killed and 87 others were injured by Fitow throughout Japan. Heavy rains triggered 527 landslides throughout the country. Fourteen structures were destroyed, 62 were damaged, and another 1,941 were affected. A total of 17,037 hectares of farmland was damaged or destroyed by Fitow. About 1,113 km of roads, 1 km of railway, 14 ports, seven bridges, and six dykes were damaged. A total of 229,916 families were left without power at the height of the storm of which 4,010 also lost water supply. Nineteen ships sank during the storm. Agricultural losses amounted to $137 million (2007 USD). Total damages from the typhoon were estimated at $1 billion (2007 USD).

=== Russia ===
Fitow brought high winds, heavy rains, and large swells to parts of eastern Russia after transitioning into an extratropical cyclone. At least four villages, with a total population of 2,000, were affected by floods triggered by the remnants of the typhoon. In a 24‑hour span, some areas recorded rainfalls equivalent to a monthly rainfall total, causing numerous rivers to overflow their banks. Power was knocked out to several communities and a few roads and bridges were washed out by floods. Officials evacuated most of the residents in the flooded areas as a precaution.

== See also ==
- Other tropical cyclones named Fitow
- Timeline of the 2007 Pacific typhoon season
