= 2001 Pacific typhoon season =

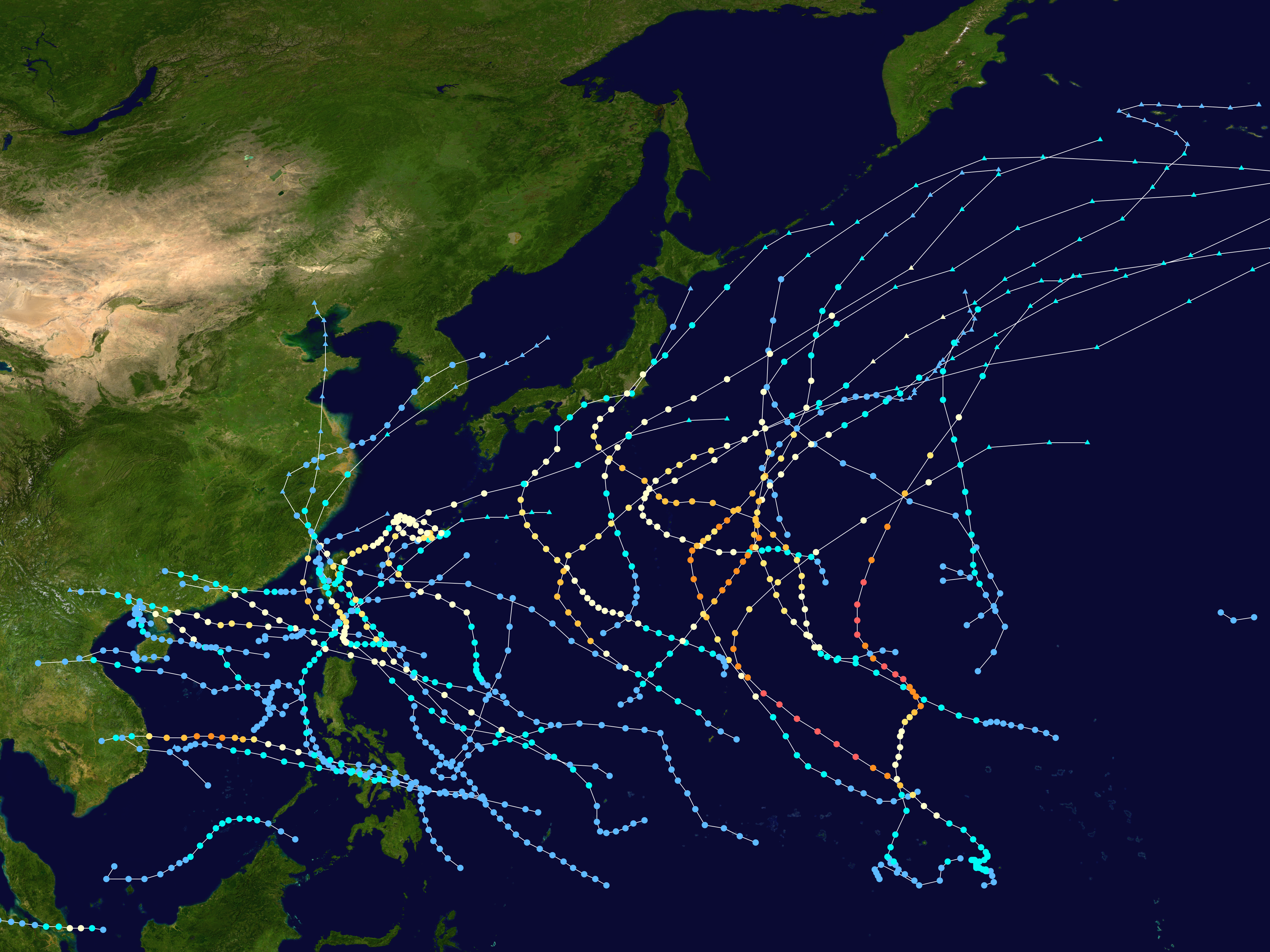
- Season summary map

Seasonal boundaries
- First system formed: February 17, 2001
- Last system dissipated: December 28, 2001 (Note: The JMA, which is the RSMC of the Northwest Pacific, downgraded Vamei to remnant low on December 28, while the JTWC continued to track it as a tropical depression until it crossed the basin on December 29.)

Strongest storm
- Name: Faxai
  - Maximum winds: 195 km/h (120 mph) (10-minute sustained)
  - Lowest pressure: 915 hPa (mbar)

Seasonal statistics
- Total depressions: 44, 2 unofficial
- Total storms: 26, 1 unofficial
- Typhoons: 16 (Note: Typhoon Soulik is not included in this season's totals but from last season's totals, despite reaching this intensity this year.)
- Very strong typhoons: 6
- Violent typhoons: 1
- ACE: 315.8
- Total fatalities: 1,714 total
- Total damage: $2.42 billion (2001 USD)

Related articles
- 2001 Atlantic hurricane season; 2001 Pacific hurricane season; 2001 North Indian Ocean cyclone season

The 2001 Pacific typhoon season was an slightly above-average season with twenty-six named storms, sixteen typhoons and three super typhoons. It ran year-round in 2001, with most tropical cyclones in the northwestern Pacific Ocean tending between May and November.

The early season was relatively inactive, with the first named storm, Cimaron, not developing until May 9. Taiwan suffered the most destruction from typhoons this year, with Typhoons Toraji, Nari, and Lekima being responsible for nearly 300 deaths in that island alone, making it one of the deadliest typhoon seasons in recorded history in that island. In November, Typhoon Lingling impacted the Philippines, killing 171 people, making it one of the deadliest Philippine storms this century. The season ended with the formation of Tropical Storm Vamei during the last week of December. Vamei would be notable for becoming the lowest latitude tropical storm, at 1.4°N, ever to be observed in the Northwest Pacific.

The scope of this article is limited to the Pacific Ocean, north of the equator and west of the International Date Line. Storms that form east of the date line and north of the equator are called hurricanes; see 2001 Pacific hurricane season. Tropical storms that formed in the West Pacific basin are assigned a name by the Tokyo Typhoon Center. Tropical depressions in this basin have the "W" suffix added to their number. Tropical depressions that enter or form in the Philippine area of responsibility are assigned a name by the Philippine Atmospheric, Geophysical and Astronomical Services Administration or PAGASA. This often results in the same storm having two names.

== Seasonal forecasts ==
TSR forecasts Date	Tropical storms	Total Typhoons	Intense TCs	Ref
Average (1971–2000)	27.2	17.0	8.2	
January 31, 2001	28.1	16.2	6.6	
June 15, 2001	26.1	17.5	8.7	
2001 season	Forecast Center	Tropical cyclones	Tropical storms	Typhoons
Actual activity:	JMA	43	25	16
Actual activity:	JTWC	33	30	20
Actual activity:	PAGASA	17	12	6

During the year, the Japan Meteorological Agency (JMA) issued advisories on tropical cyclones west of the International Date Line to the Malay Peninsula, and north of the equator, in its role as the official Regional Specialized Meteorological Center, as designated by the World Meteorological Organization in 1989. The JMA issued forecasts and analyses every six hours starting at midnight UTC using numerical weather prediction (NWP) and a climatological tropical cyclone forecast model. They used the Dvorak technique and NWP to estimate 10-minute sustained winds and barometric pressure. The JTWC also issued warnings on storms within the basin, operating from Pearl Harbor in Hawaii and supplying forecasts to the United States Armed Forces in the Indian and Pacific Oceans.

On January 31, Tropical Storm Risk (TSR) issued their extended range forecast for the Northwest Pacific in 2001, predicting near-average activity in terms of tropical storms, but a slightly below average in terms of typhoons. They predict that around 28 tropical storms would form, in which 17 of them would become typhoons, and 8 would further intensify to intense typhoons. TSR uses anomalous patterns of sea-surface temperatures (SSTs) over in the Niño 3.4 region (5°N-5°S, 120°W-170°W) during the August–September SST forecast as a predictor. With a predicted anomaly of −0.27 °C, a weak La Niña is expected — which tends to suppress tropical cyclone activity or intensity. On June 15, TSR issued their pre-season forecast, predicting a neutral typhoon season. Predicted tropical storm numbers have decreased to 26, but both their predicted typhoon and intense typhoon numbers have increased to 18 and 9, respectively. The key factor to this prediction is now due to the anticipated neutral value for the August–September SST forecast in the Niño 4 region (5°S – 5°N, 150°W – 160°E) of +0.27 °C.

== Seasonal summary ==
The Accumulated Cyclone Energy (ACE) index for the 2001 Pacific typhoon season as calculated by Colorado State University using data from the Joint Typhoon Warning Center was 307.3 units. Broadly speaking, ACE is a measure of the power of a tropical or subtropical storm multiplied by the length of time it existed. It is only calculated for full advisories on specific tropical and subtropical systems reaching or exceeding wind speeds of 39 miles per hour (63 km/h).

The season ran with weak La Niña conditions during the first quarter of the year and near-normal conditions throughout the rest of the year, with average sea-surface temperatures in the Niño 3.4 region of around −0.3 °C. It was the final year of a rather strong La Niña episode that persisted throughout most of the Pacific Ocean since 1998. This was demonstrated with this season's tropical activity being more active than the previous three seasons, but overall tropical activity still remaining below average.

2001 opened with Tropical Storm Soulik, from the previous season, active in the Philippine Sea. Soulik strengthened into the first typhoon seen this year and reached its peak intensity as a Category 3-equivalent typhoon on January 3, before quickly dissipating the next day. The formation of Tropical Depression 01W (Auring), however, officially initiated the start of the annual typhoon season on February 17. No tropical cyclones developed until after two months later, when another tropical depression had developed to the southeast of the Philippines. Tropical cyclogenesis gradually increased when May arrived – with three tropical systems developing. Two of these systems were only recognised as minor tropical depressions, while the other strengthened to the first official named storm of this year, Cimaron, which moved through the Philippine archipelago in the middle of the month.

== Systems ==
=== Severe Tropical Storm Cimaron (Crising) ===
- Severe tropical storm (JMA)
- Tropical storm (SSHWS)
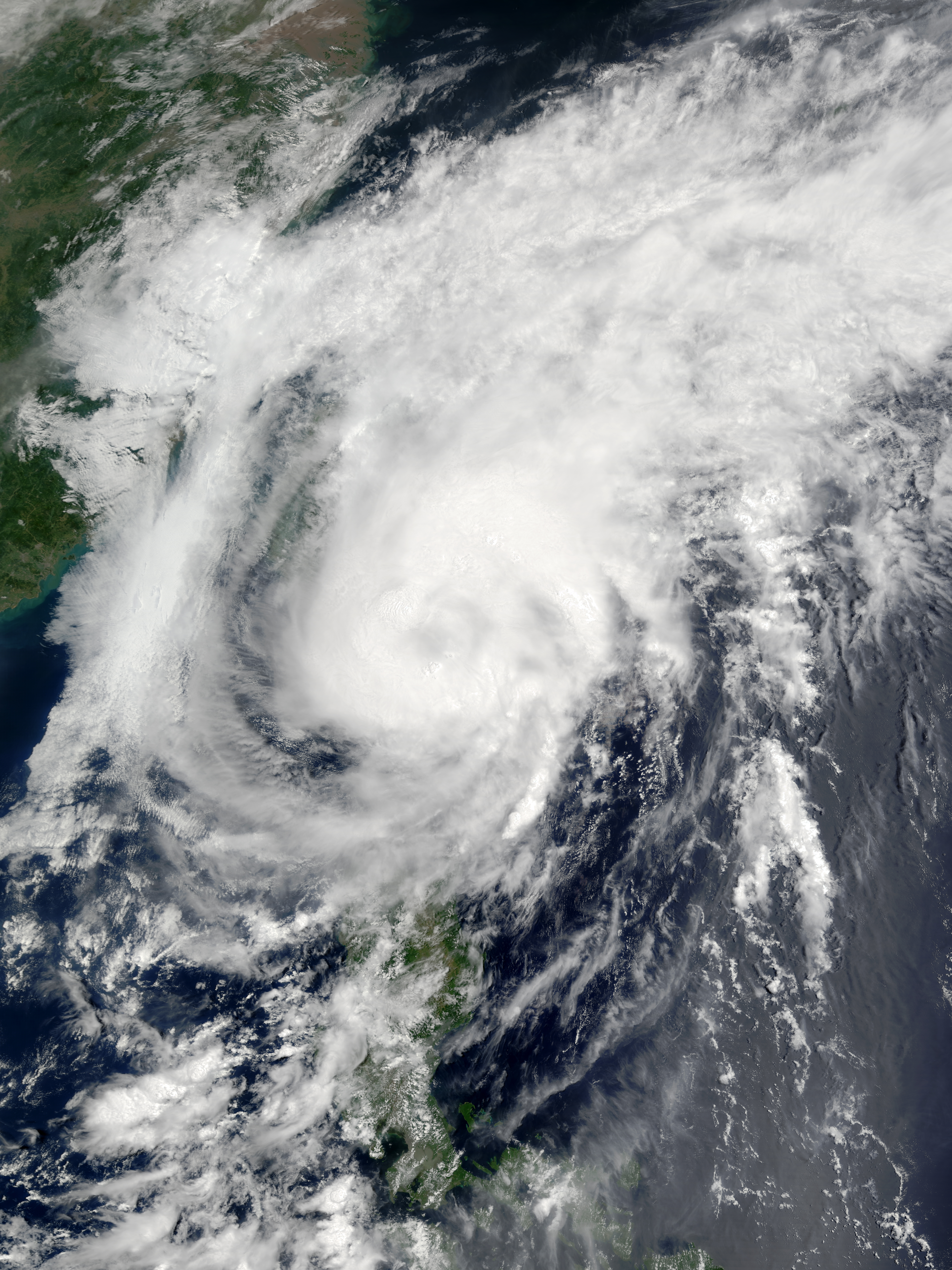
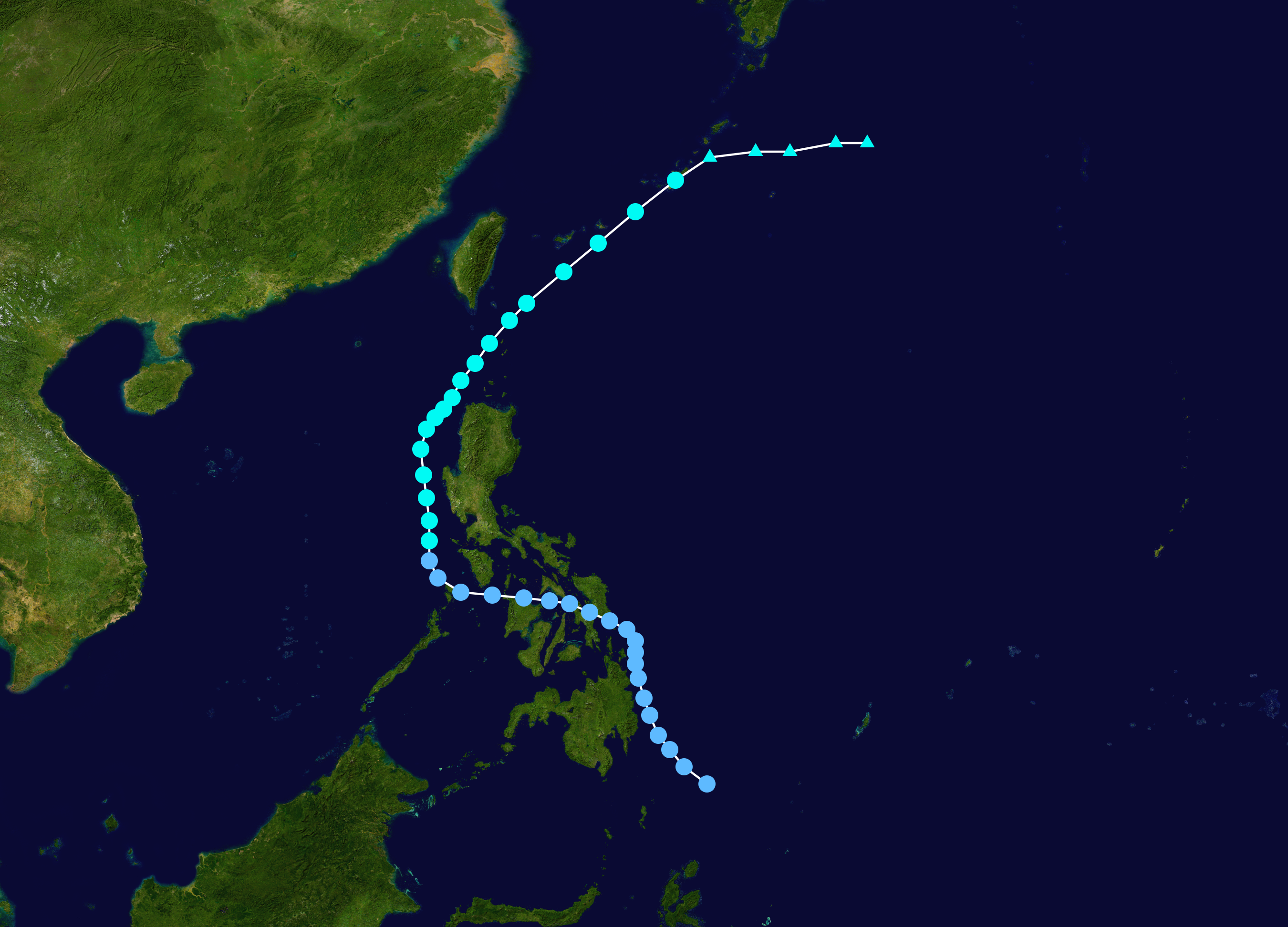
- Duration: May 9 – May 15
- Peak intensity: 95 km/h (60 mph) (10-min); 985 hPa (mbar)

A weak low-level circulation center (LLCC) south of Koror developed from a monsoon trough on May 4. The system was later upgraded to a tropical depression and was assigned 03W by the JTWC on May 7, before the JMA followed suit in upgrading its status on May 9, and at the same time, was assigned the name Crising by PAGASA after it entered its responsibility area. The following day, Tropical Depression 03W intensified to a tropical storm and was given the name Cimaron by the JMA. The storm was weakened by vertical wind shear on May 12, before it resumed intensifying and by May 13, was upgraded to a severe tropical storm after attaining 10-minute sustained winds of 95 km/h (60 mph). Cimaron slowly began to transition into an extratropical cyclone due to a weakening trend with vertical shear as the storm accelerated northeastward. Cimaron passed over 148 km (92 mi) southwest of Naha, Okinawa on May 14, before transitioning into an extratropical cyclone and becoming last noted by the JMA on May 15.

After having become an extratropical cyclone, strong winds struck the Ishigaki Island on May 14 and caused a building to collapse and also damage a plastic greenhouse. The damages in the island were estimated at ¥26.4 million (US$217 thousand) Furthermore, at Miyako Island, an additional ¥139 million (US$1.14 million) of damages occurred, and 22 flights were cancelled for 14 days. The storm later approached Okinawa, and around 20,000 people were affected, due to roads being flooded, and land transportation was crowded. A landslide out of three occurred in Naha City, resulting in 19 people evacuating and a household losing power. The overall damages in Okinawa totaled ¥318 million (US$2.62 million).

=== Typhoon Chebi (Emong) ===
- Typhoon (JMA)
- Category 3 typhoon (SSHWS)
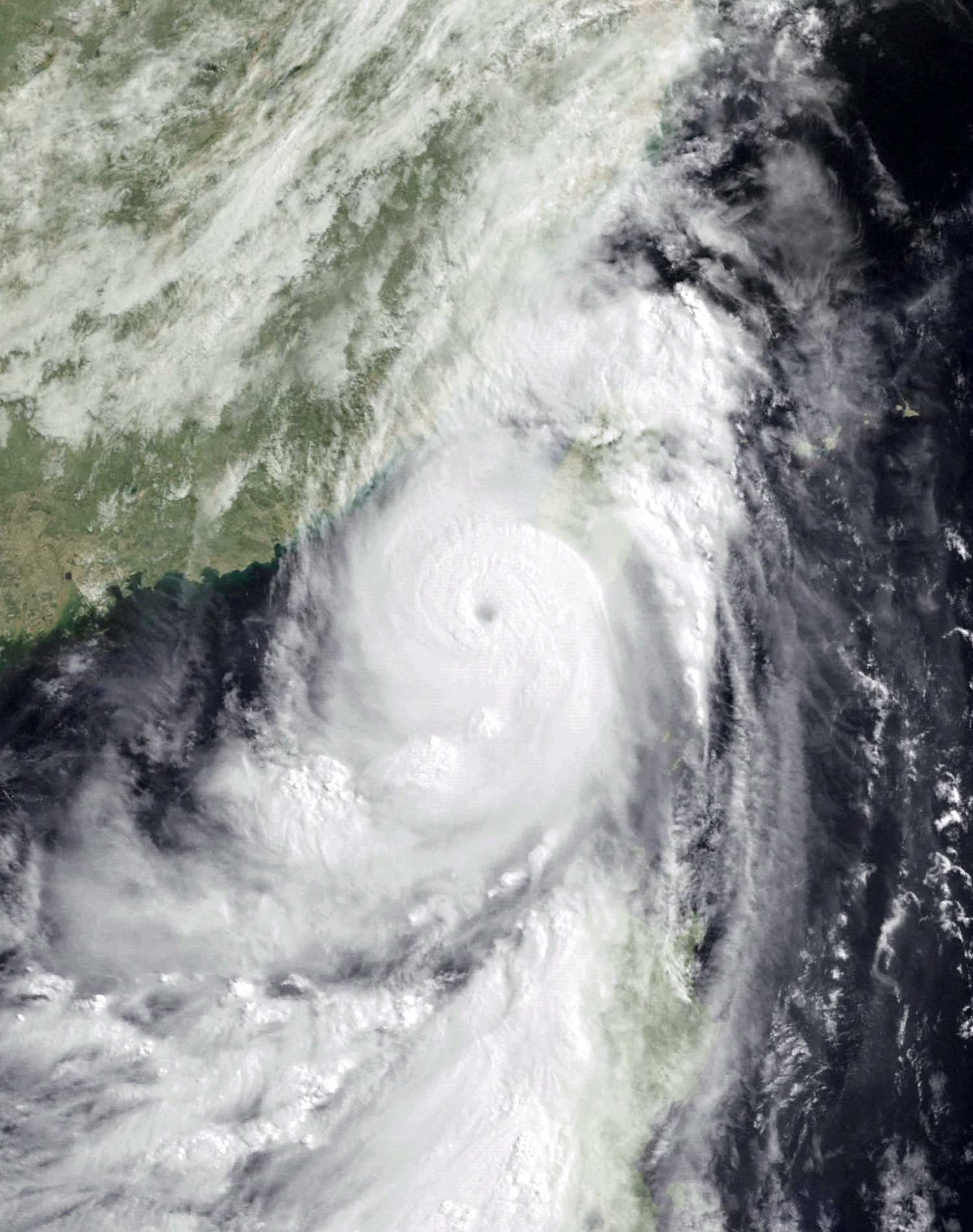
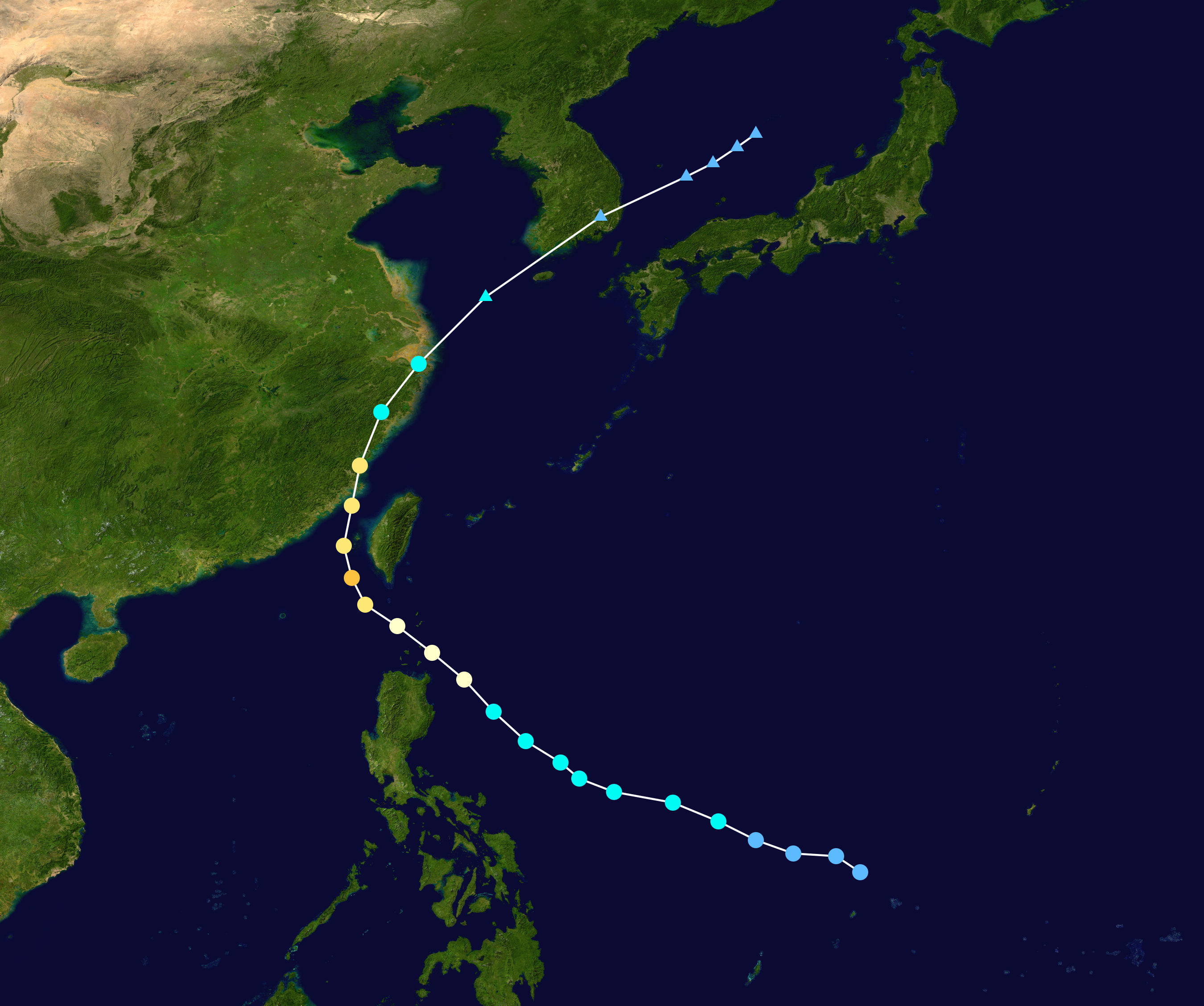
- Duration: June 19 – June 24
- Peak intensity: 120 km/h (75 mph) (10-min); 965 hPa (mbar)

On June 19, an area of convection developed southeast of Yap and by 18:00 UTC, was centered 278 km (173 mi) east-northeast of Palau. Rapid development occurred and the disturbance became identified as Tropical Depression 04W by the JTWC at 21:00 UTC. After entering the PAR and receiving the name Emong by PAGASA, the depression intensified into a tropical storm on June 20. Chebi headed northwest while being located east of the Philippines on June 21 at 06:00 UTC, and would later attain severe tropical storm intensity, before intensifying further to a typhoon the following day. Chebi reached its peak intensity on June 23, before a trough forced Chebi west and northwest where it made landfall near Fuzhou City, China. Chebi rapidly weakened while accelerating northward, and would degrade into an extratropical cyclone on June 24. Its remnants were last noted by the JMA along with other weather centers before dissipating on June 30.

Chebi killed 82 people, mostly in China, and left $422 million (2001 USD), $457 million (2005 USD). Chebi's heavy rains and strong winds left nine people dead, 28 missing and $13 million (2001 USD) in damage in the Philippines. Four of the nine were from a Belizean freighter that sank during the storm. The Penghu Islands, which took the brunt of the typhoon, suffered considerable damage as 102 fishing boats sank and ten thousand people were left without power. The storm also crippled ground and air traffic. A rain laden typhoon, Chebi produced 100 millimeters of rain across Guangdong. About 73 people were killed in China, most of them in the southeastern province of Fujian. The storm also destroyed several thousand acres of crops, resulting in economic losses. In Ningde, about 321,400 houses were destroyed by the typhoon. About 22 people were killed in Hangzhou when a landslide burst through a construction wall.

=== Severe Tropical Storm Durian ===
- Severe tropical storm (JMA)
- Category 1 typhoon (SSHWS)
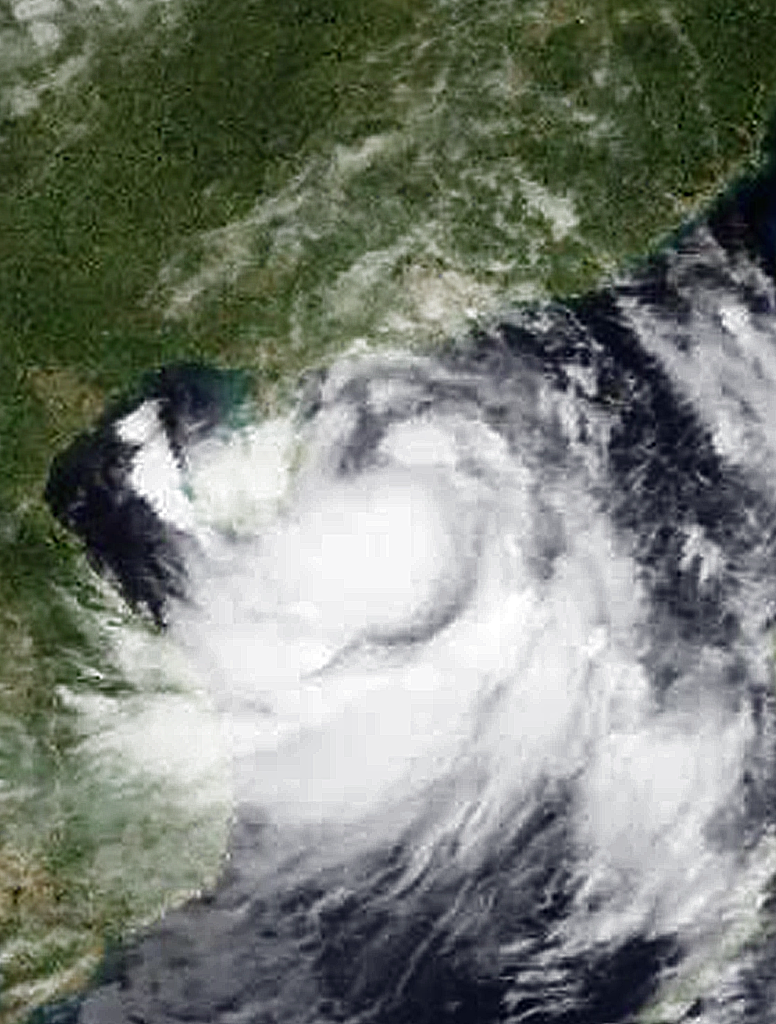
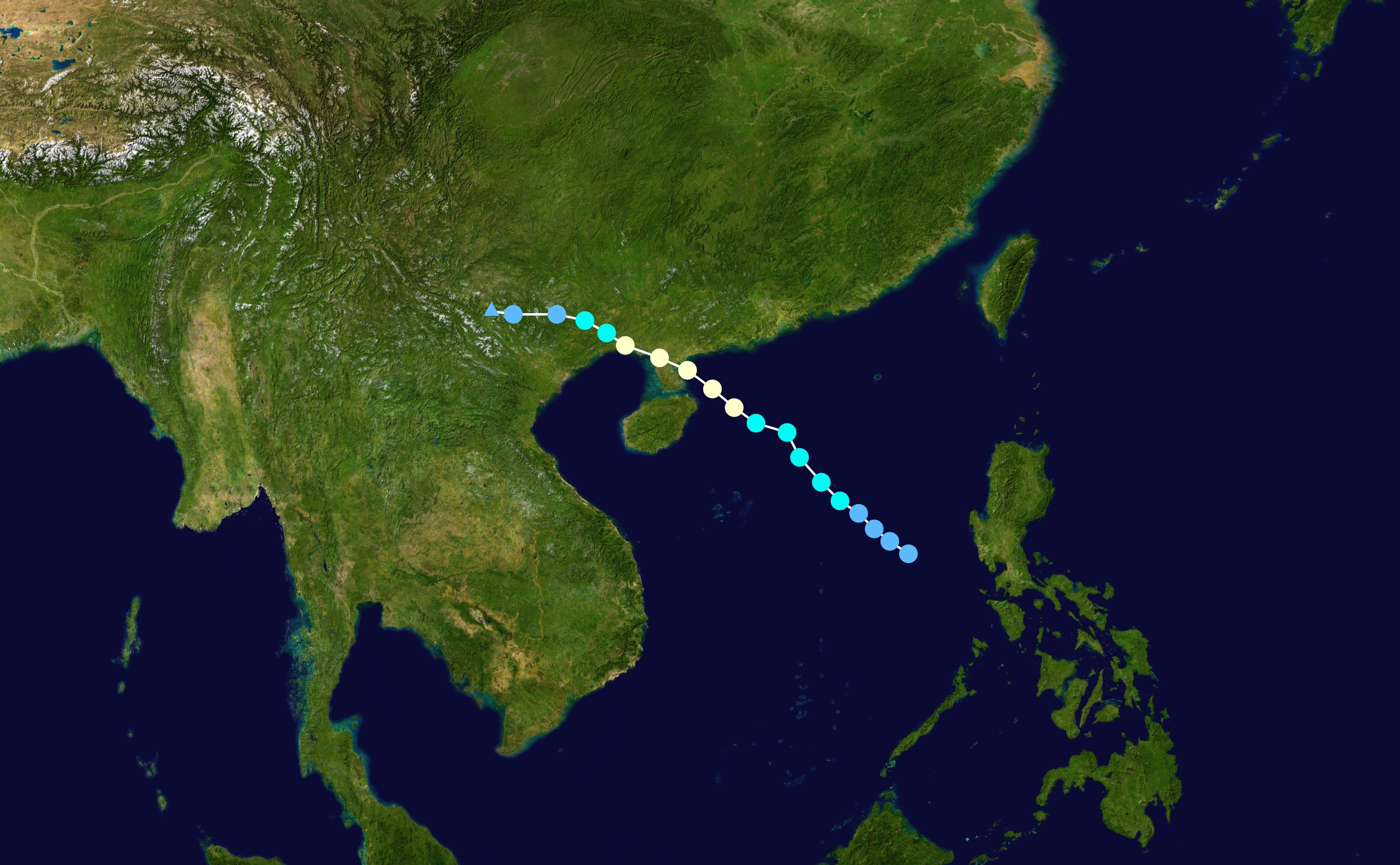
- Duration: June 29 – July 2
- Peak intensity: 110 km/h (70 mph) (10-min); 970 hPa (mbar)

The monsoon trough produced another disturbance that upgraded into a tropical depression to the west of Luzon on June 29. The tropical depression tracked northwestward while a subtropical ridge influenced the depression and caused it to upgrade to Tropical Storm Durian on June 30. The storm attained severe tropical storm status at 18:00 UTC the same day, with 10-minute winds of 110 km/h (70 mph) and 1-minute winds of 140 km/h (85 mph), making it equivalent to Category 1 winds on the Saffir–Simpson scale. Durian had an atmospheric pressure of 970 hPa (29 inHg). Durian made landfall on the Leizhou Peninsula, before rapidly weakening as it continued in the same direction before the JTWC stopped advisories of the storm on July 2, with the JMA doing the same the following day.

The name Durian was submitted by Thailand and refers to the Southeast Asian fruit of the same name. Throughout the provinces of Guangdong, Guangxi, and Hainan, more than 4.3 million people were affected, with over 13 thousand houses being destroyed. 21 people went missing off the coast of Guangdong. Zhanjiang suffered agricultural damage, with sugarcane fields and banana trees being destroyed and the deaths of over 52 thousand farm animals. Overall, Durian caused 65 deaths and 4.5 billion yuan ($449 million) in China, and over 500 people were reported injured. An injury also occurred in Hong Kong. In Northern Vietnam, 32 people were killed and 3 people went missing, with more than 20 thousand homes being destroyed by flooding. Durian was responsible for some of the worst flooding in Northern Vietnam for 40 years, with rainfall of up to 17 inches between July 2 and 4. The Vietnamese military sent amphibious vehicles to aid rescue efforts in the province of Thái Nguyên.

=== Severe Tropical Storm Utor (Feria) ===
- Severe tropical storm (JMA)
- Category 1 typhoon (SSHWS)
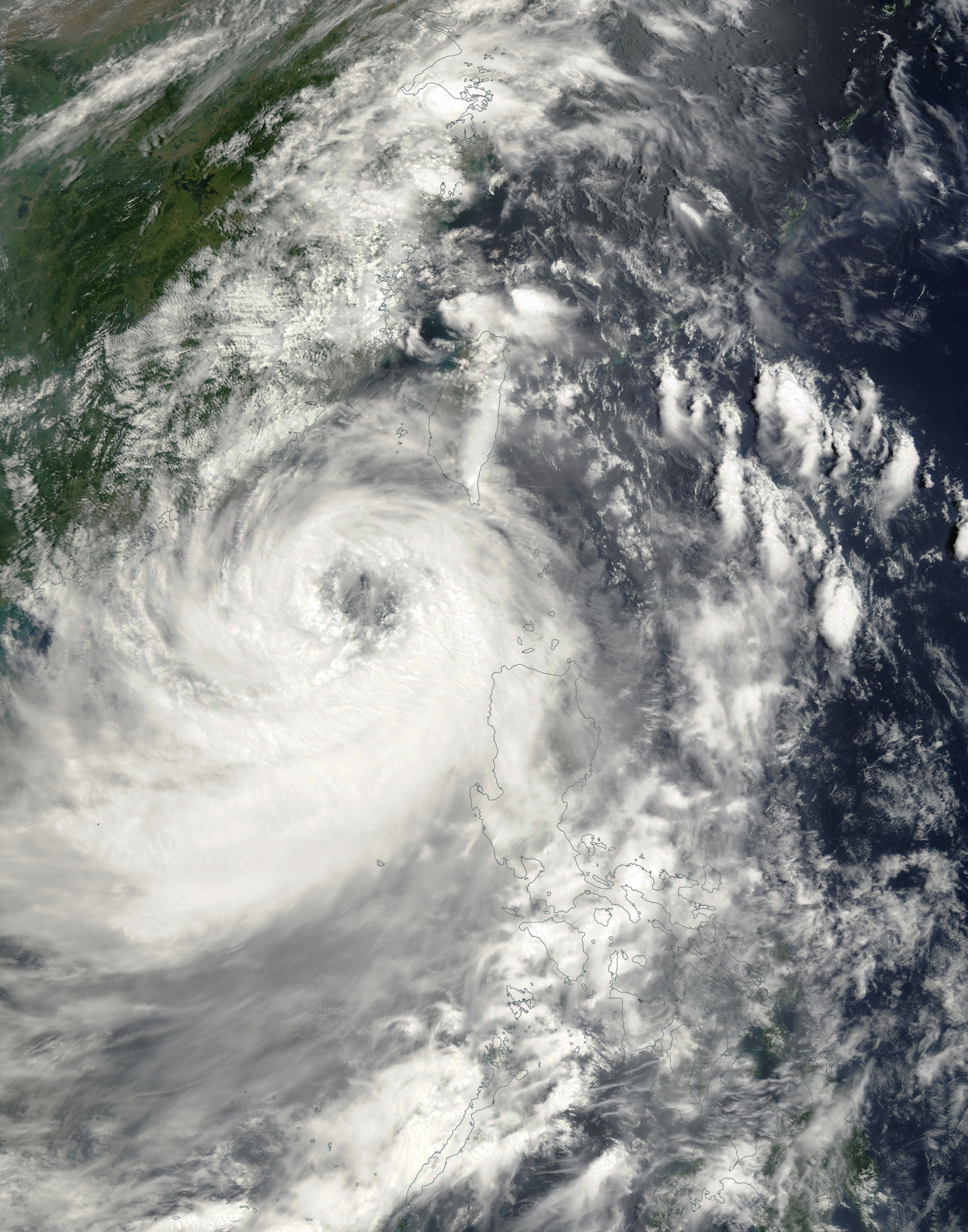
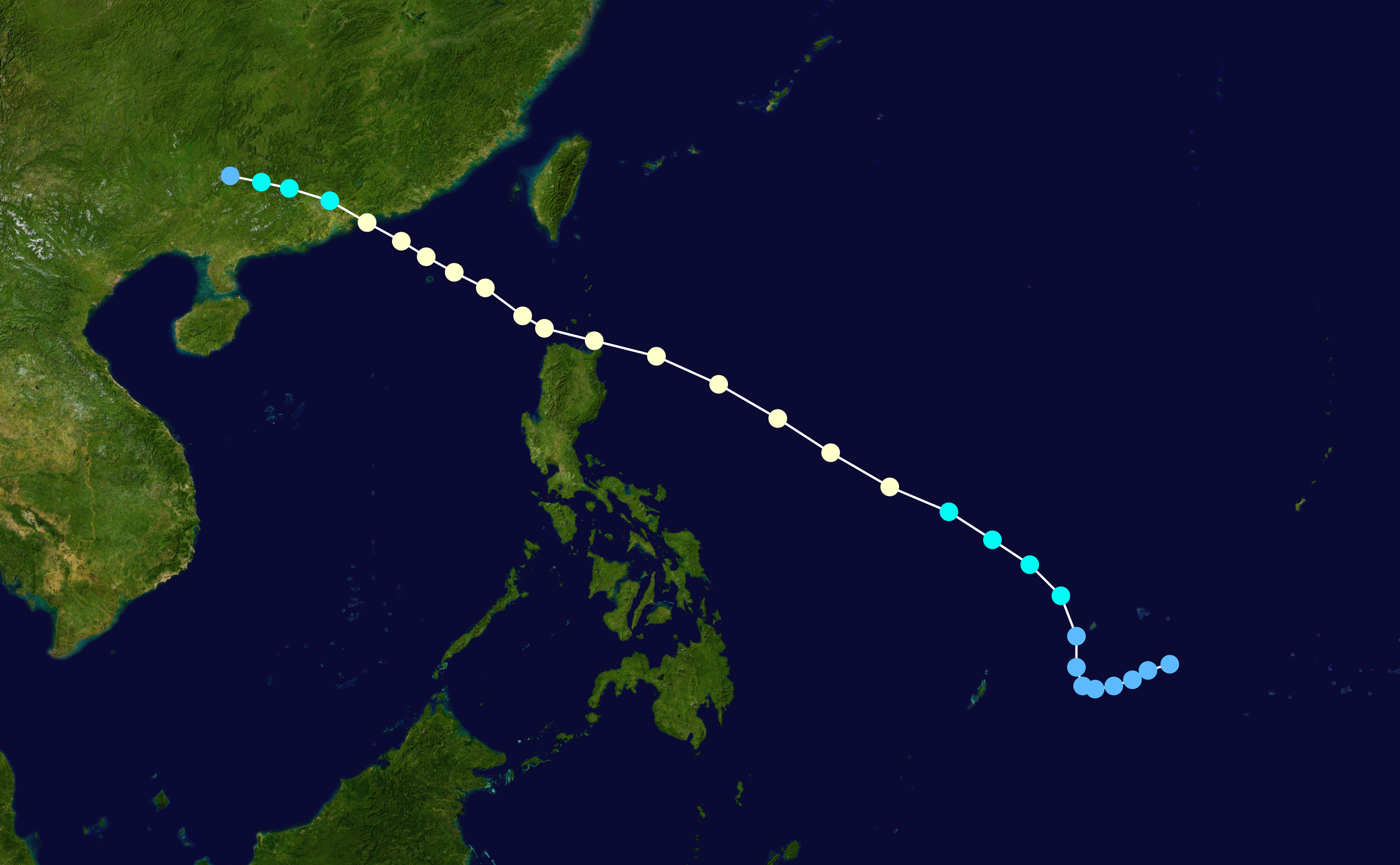
- Duration: July 1 – July 7
- Peak intensity: 110 km/h (70 mph) (10-min); 960 hPa (mbar)

Utor spawned from an area of convection that developed off 907 km (565 mi) south-southeast of Guam on June 26, that remained quasi-stationary for 2 days before upgrading to a tropical depression on July 1 due to favorable conditions such as low vertical shear. The depression strengthen into a tropical storm at 00:00 UTC on July 2. Utor tracked west-northwest from a peripheral ridge and developed further, after entering the Philippine Area of Responsibility, and attained severe tropical storm status the following day. Utor was a large cyclone, with gale-force wind of 250 nmi (465 km; 290 mi). Utor reached its peak strength on June 4, with 10-minute winds of 110 km/h (70 mph) and 1-minute winds of 150 km/h (95 mph), with the barometric pressure of 960 hPa (28 inHg). Utor was centered 56 km (35 mi) near northern Luzon and tracked northwesterly as it began to weaken. The storm made landfall near the east of Hong Kong on July 5 and quickly weakened before being last noted on July 7 by the JMA.

Utor, while not a very strong storm, brought heavy rain amounting to $297.2 million (2001 USD) in damage, as well as causing 203 fatalities.

=== Tropical Storm Trami (Gorio) ===
- Tropical storm (JMA)
- Tropical storm (SSHWS)
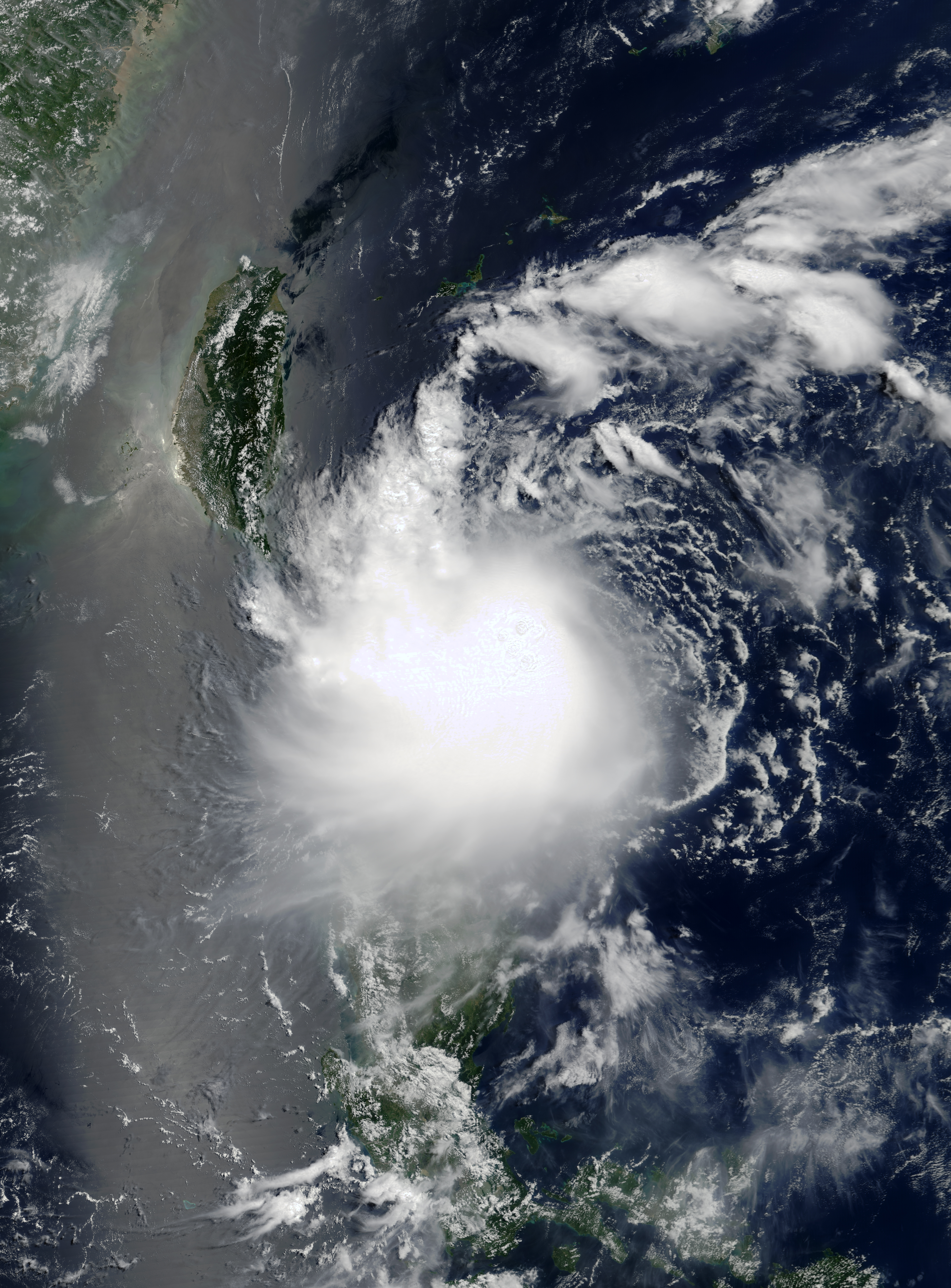
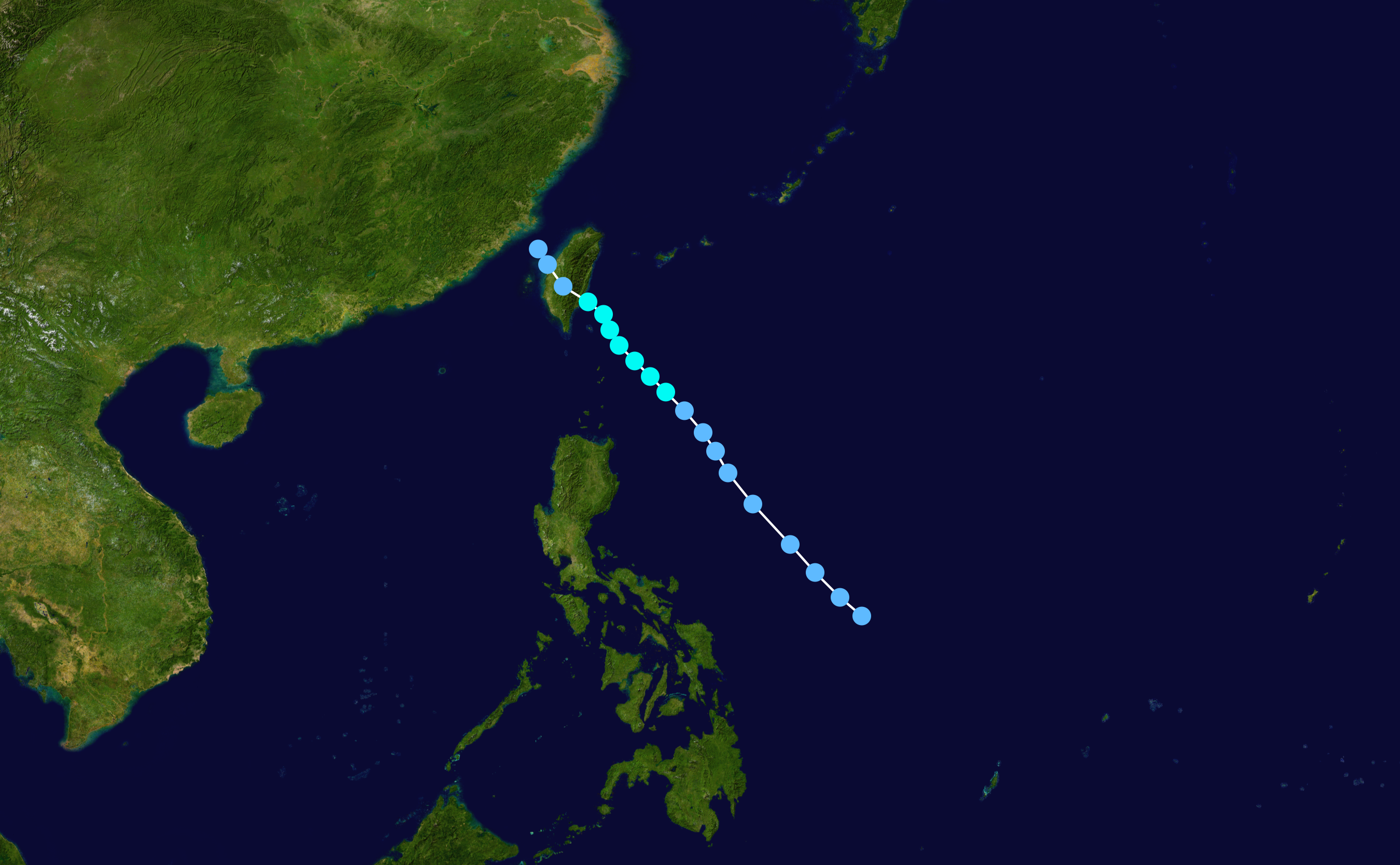
- Duration: July 8 – July 11
- Peak intensity: 75 km/h (45 mph) (10-min); 994 hPa (mbar)

Tropical Storm Trami originated from a disturbance that developed about 222 km (138 mi) northwest of Chuuk on July 3. Bursts of deep convection near the center were observed on the 7th, although the system remained disorganized. Organization improved and by July 8, was upgraded to a tropical depression. Moving northwestward, the system gradually intensified, and the PAGASA began initiating advisories on 18:00 UTC of the same day, naming the system, Gorio. Six hours later, the JTWC already deemed the system as Tropical Depression 07W. Deep convection persisted to the west of its well-defined, but a partially exposed center. Thus, the system gained strength into a tropical storm, with the JMA naming it as Trami. Northeasterly shear prevented the storm to significantly intensify, and therefore Trami maintained tropical storm intensity for a day — only peaking with 10-minute sustained wind speeds of 75 km/h (45 mph). By 12:00 UTC of July 11, Trami moved over Taiwan and into the Taiwan Strait, where Trami rapidly weakened and dissipated. No other storm weakened into a tropical depression over Taiwan until Typhoon Krathon did so on October 4, 2024.

Trami mostly affected Taiwan with just rainfall. However, Kaohsiung and Pingtung counties experienced the heaviest rainfall in 40 years. In Kaohsiung City, streets were clogged with bonded cars due to severe flooding, and more than 100,000 homes were left without power. The floods resulted in only five deaths in the southern part of the city.

=== Typhoon Kong-rey ===
- Typhoon (JMA)
- Category 2 typhoon (SSHWS)
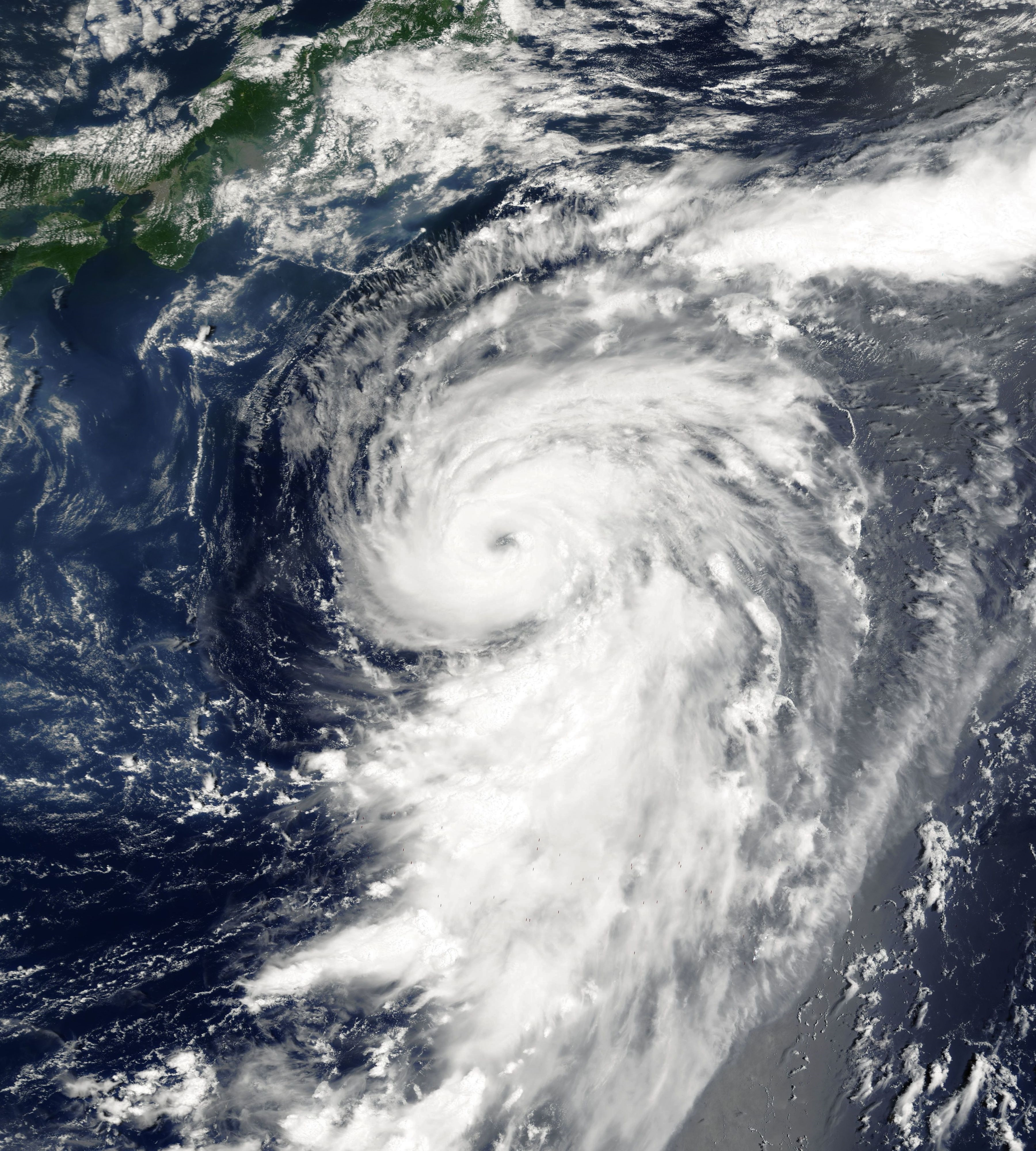
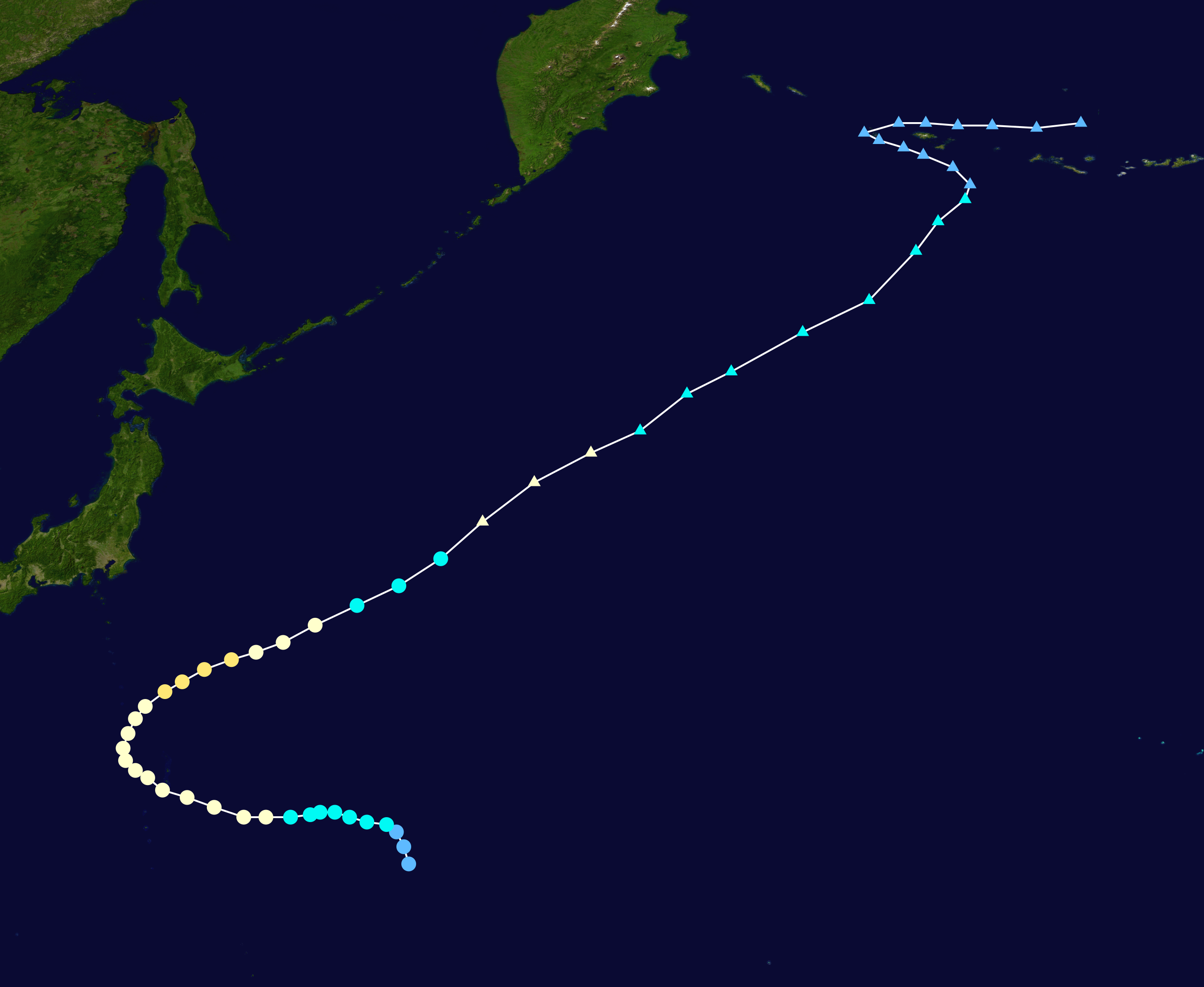
- Duration: July 21 – July 28
- Peak intensity: 130 km/h (80 mph) (10-min); 955 hPa (mbar)

Tropical Depression 09W developed from an area of convection about 1,000 km (620 mi) to the east of Iwo Jima on July 21. Continued consolidation of its convection prompted both the JTWC to classify it as a tropical storm on 18:00 UTC. The JMA followed suit six hours later and named it Kong-rey. By July 23, the JTWC upgraded Kong-rey to a typhoon while the JMA upgraded it to a severe tropical storm. A mid-latitude ridge to the east of Japan strengthened, causing Kong-rey to curve and move in a northeastward direction. Kong-rey reached its peak intensity on July 25, then slightly weakened afterwards. At the same time, the JMA had finally upgraded Kong-rey to a typhoon. On July 26, a redevelopment of a small eye caused Kong-rey to reach its second peak intensity for a short period of time. Its peak strength only maxed out to 10-minute sustained winds of 130 km/h (81 mph). Increasing wind shear caused the typhoon to weaken the next day. Kong-rey was downgraded to a tropical storm on 00:00 UTC of July 28. Both agencies issued their final warning later that day when it had become extratropical. Its remnants was still tracked until it reached the southwestern Aleutian Islands on August 3.

=== Severe Tropical Storm Yutu (Huaning) ===
- Severe tropical storm (JMA)
- Category 2 typhoon (SSHWS)
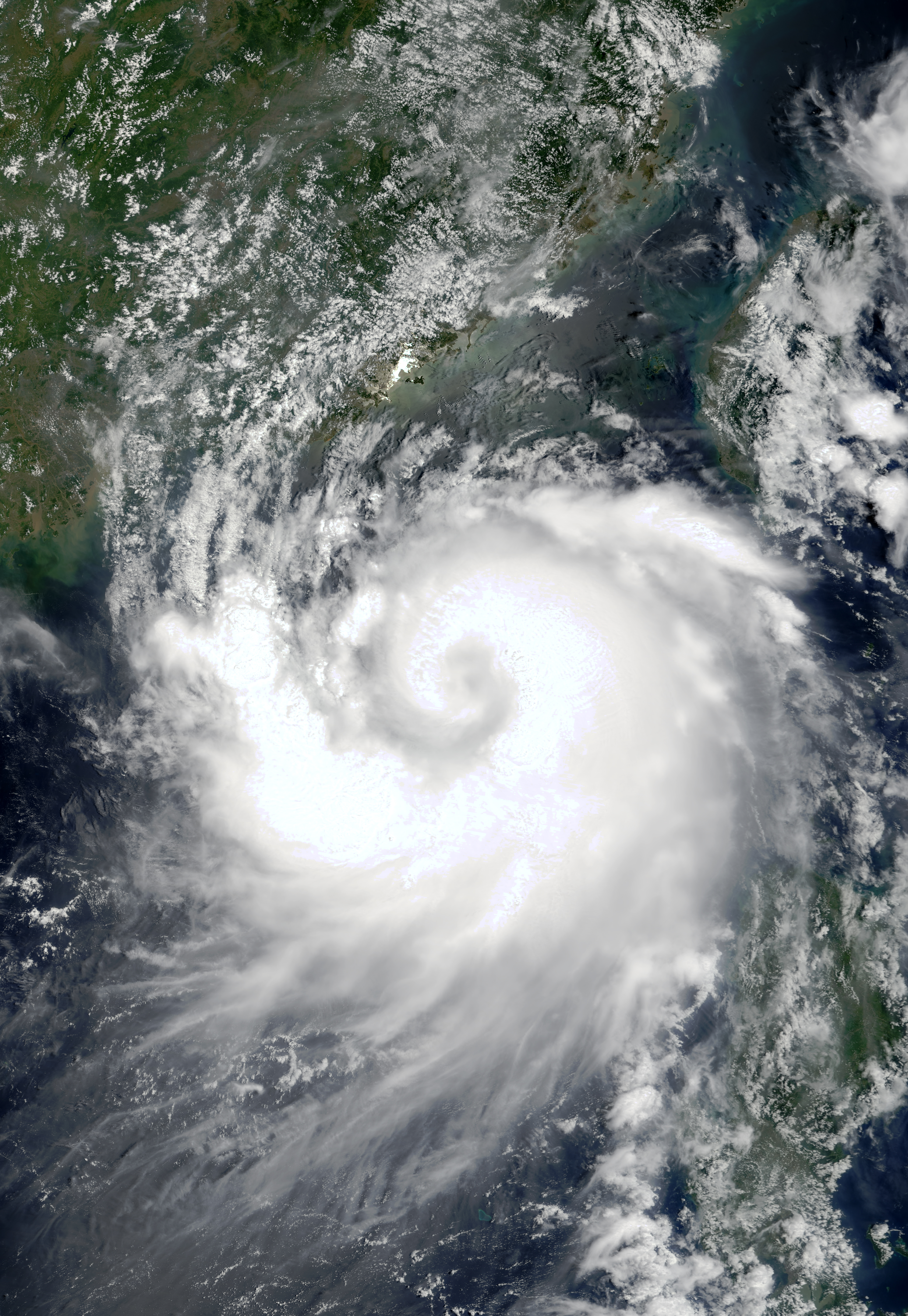
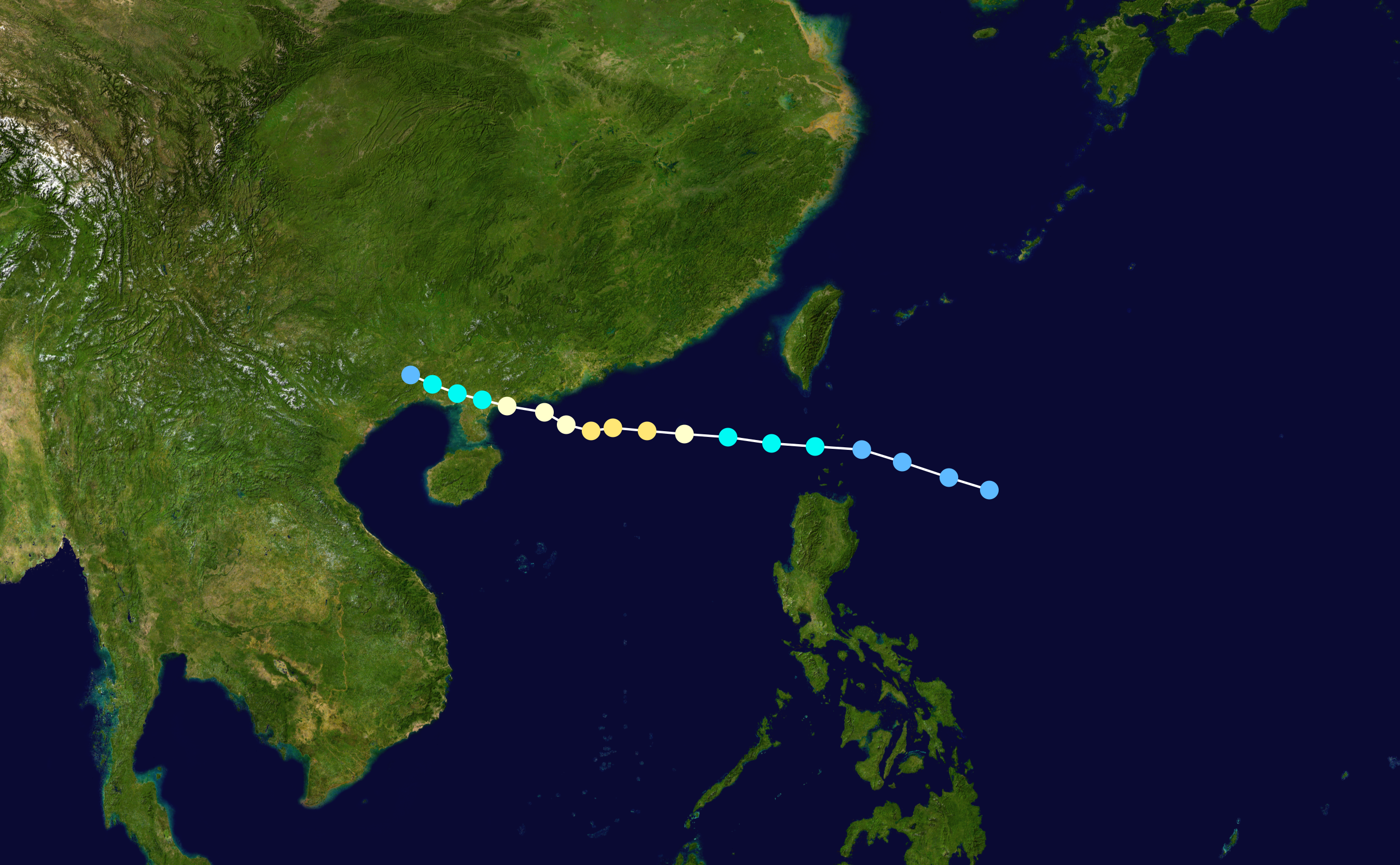
- Duration: July 22 – July 26
- Peak intensity: 100 km/h (65 mph) (10-min); 975 hPa (mbar)

A tropical depression had developed to the east of the northern tip of Cagayan, Philippines on July 22. On the next day, the PAGASA began initiating advisories on the system also, and had named it Huaning. The system strengthened into a tropical storm in the same day and was named Yutu by the JMA. Yutu moved in a general westward direction and passed the extreme northern Philippine islands. Satellite imagery depicted that a tightly wrapped convective banding was circulating around a developing eye, signalling that Yutu was undergoing a phase of rapid deepening. Thus, the JTWC quickly upgraded Yutu to a 70-knot typhoon. The JMA, however, only classified it as a severe tropical storm. On 12:00 UTC of July 25, Yutu reached its peak intensity as a Category 2-equivalent typhoon. The system slowly weakened afterwards, and seven hours later, Yutu made landfall over the Dianbai District. Yutu significantly weakened and fully dissipated on July 26.

Upon its landfall, Yutu brought gusty winds and rainfall throughout the Guandong province and nearby areas. Xuwen County recorded 260 mm (10 in) of rainfall for a 24-hour period from July 25–26. The city of Cheung Chau had experienced wind gusts of up to 63 knots (117 km/h; 72 mph). About 4,650 houses were destroyed in the province. Estimated damages were up to ¥700 million (US$109 million). No fatalities were reported, however ten people were injured by Yutu in Hong Kong.

=== Typhoon Toraji (Isang) ===
- Typhoon (JMA)
- Category 3 typhoon (SSHWS)
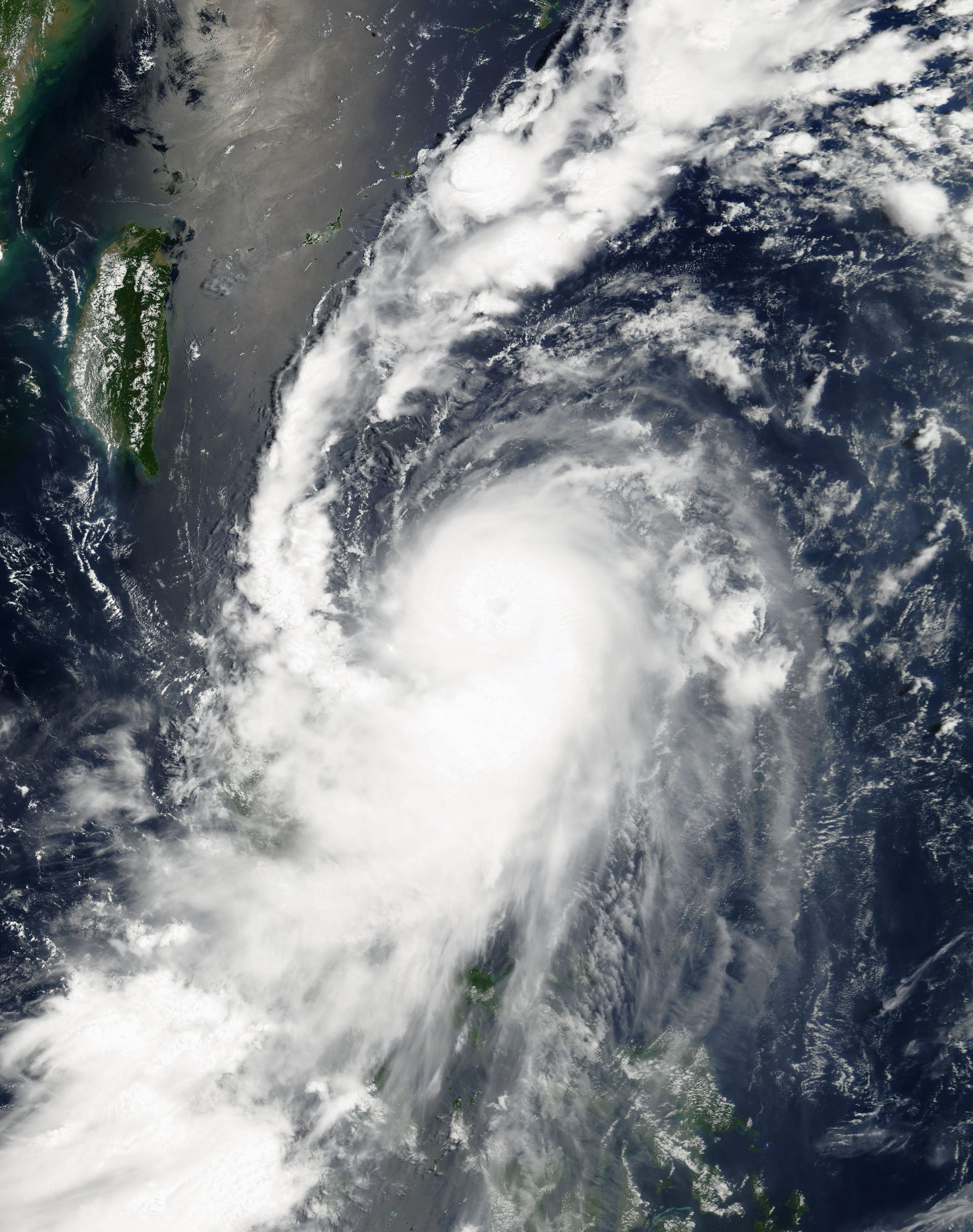
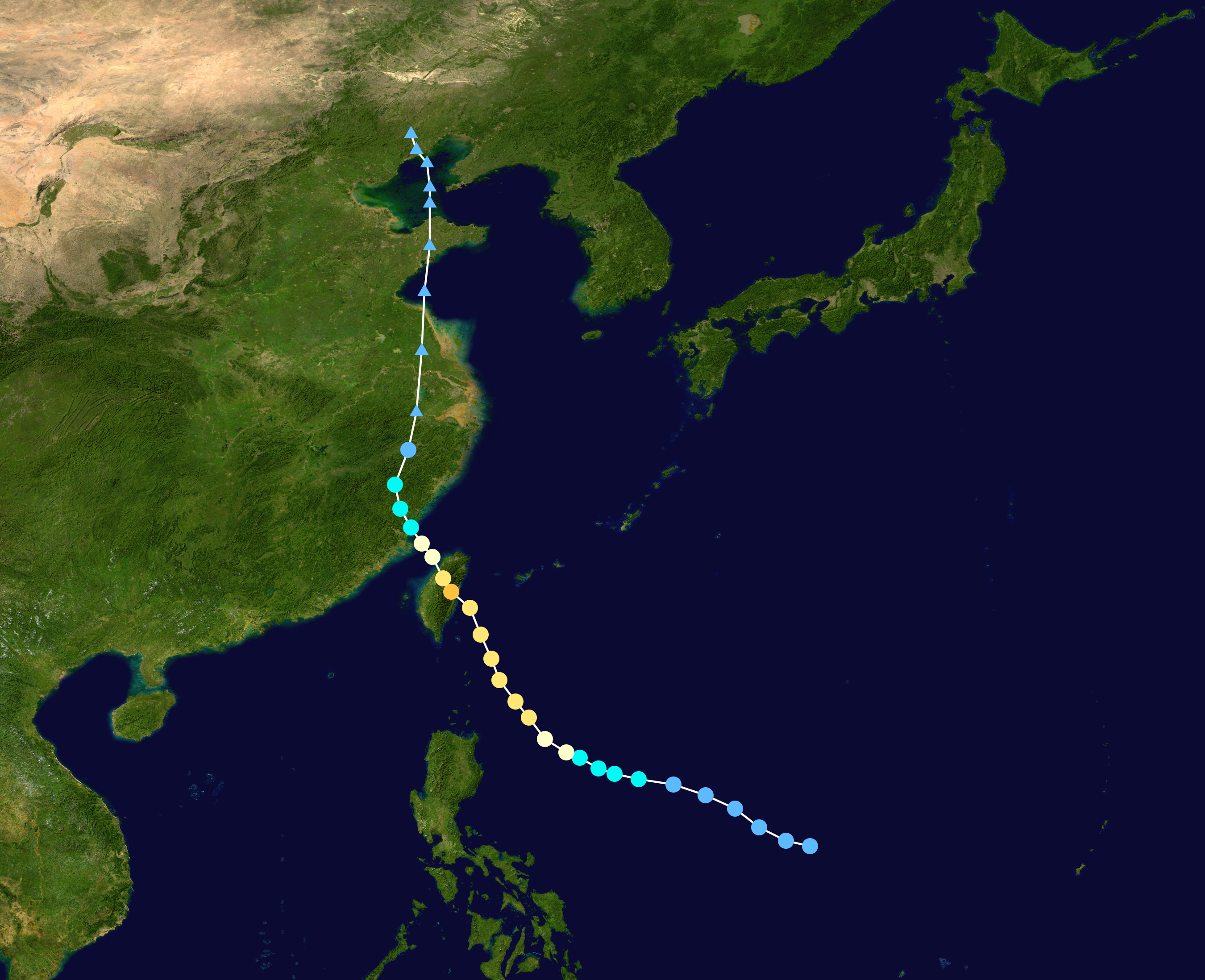
- Duration: July 25 – August 1
- Peak intensity: 140 km/h (85 mph) (10-min); 960 hPa (mbar)

A persistent but isolated deep convection near a broad LLCC was embedded to the monsoon trough approximately 356 mi (573 km) west of Guam on July 24. After organization and further development, the disturbance formed as Tropical Depression 11W and received the name Isang from PAGASA on July 25. The depression was far east of the Philippines as it tracked northwestward then west-northwestward. 11W intensified to tropical storm strength on July 27 east of Luzon. Toraji attained further to severe tropical storm status at 12:00 UTC before become a typhoon at 18:00 UTC the same day. Toraji moved north-northwesterly due to forming in a weakness in the subtropical ridge. Typhoon Toraji reached its peak strength on July 28, with 10-minute winds of 140 km/h (85 mph) and 1-minute winds of 185 km/h (115 mph), with the barometric pressure of 960 hPa (28 inHg), after making landfall in eastern Taiwan. Toraji weakened and was downgraded to a tropical depression while being near the coast of southeastern China on July 30, before making landfall that day. Toraji transitioned to an extratropical cyclone on August 1 before dissipating 2 days later.

Torrential rainfall produced by the storm triggered flash flooding and landslides across Taiwan, killing 200 people and leaving NT$7.7 billion (US$245 million) in damage. At least 30 people were killed in a village located in Nantou County which was completely buried by mud and rocks. In the wake of the storm, Taiwan's Premier, Chang Chun-hsiung criticized the excessive development of Taiwan and lack of heedance of possible negative effects for the significant loss of life from Toraji. He also initiated a reforestation project to avoid future disasters of a similar scale.

=== Typhoon Man-yi ===
- Typhoon (JMA)
- Category 4 typhoon (SSHWS)
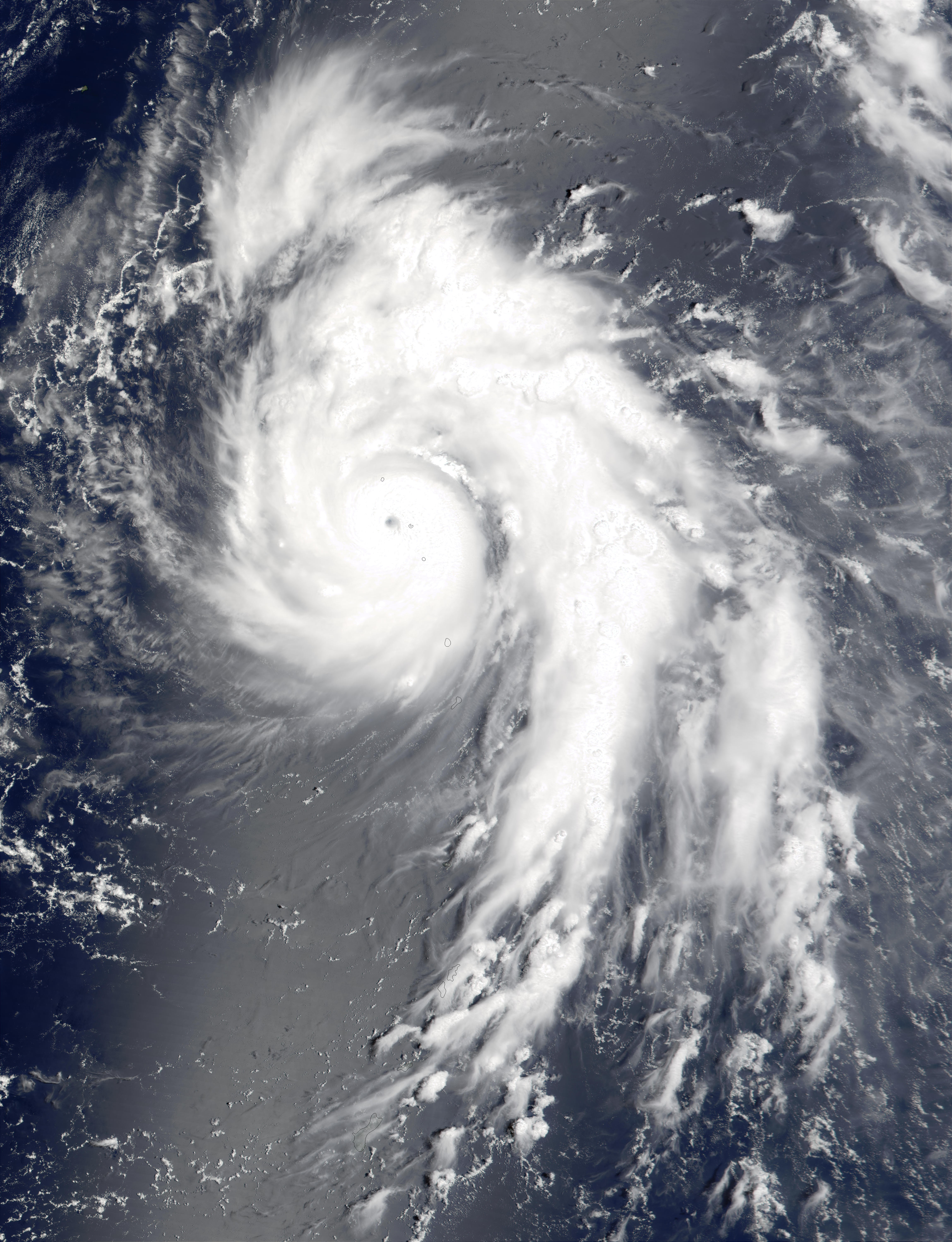
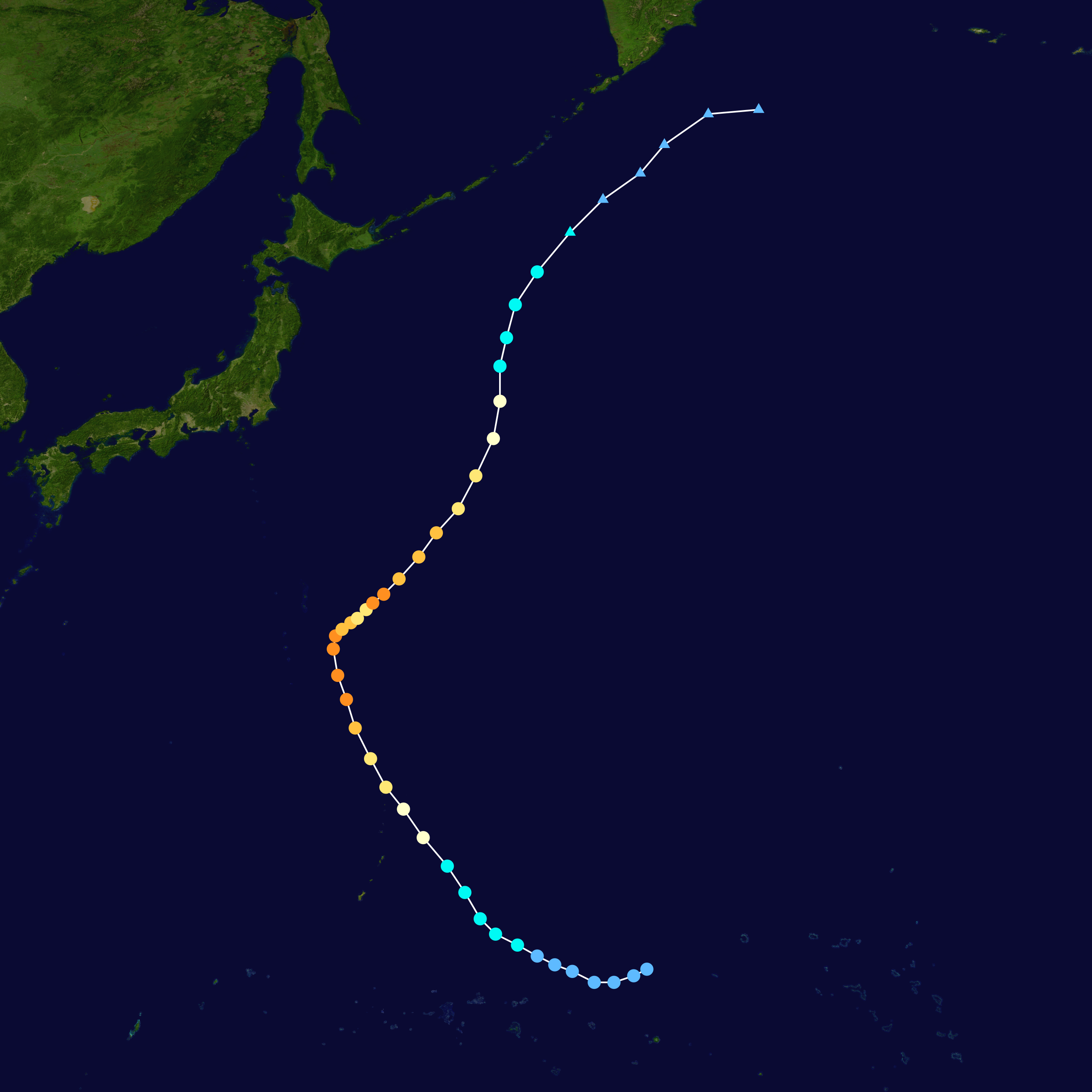
- Duration: August 1 – August 9
- Peak intensity: 150 km/h (90 mph) (10-min); 955 hPa (mbar)

On July 31, the JTWC started to monitor on a tropical disturbance that had developed about 278 km (173 mi) to the north of Pohnpei. The system developed into a tropical depression the next day, with the JTWC designating it as 12W. A central dense overcast built up over cloud tops as cold as −83 °C (−117 °F) from infrared satellite imagery. 12W further strengthened to a tropical storm by August 2, with the JMA receiving the name Man-yi.

The system gradually intensified as it moved northwest, with the JTWC considering Man-yi a minimal typhoon on the next day. The JMA, however, followed suit on August 4. At this time, deep convection was found to be developing near its eyewall and its cyclonic structure was becoming much more symmetrical. The JTWC quickly upgraded Man-yi to a high-end Category 3 typhoon. By 12:00 UTC, Man-yi reached its first initial peak strength as a Category 4-equivalent typhoon. Throughout the next day, Man-yi began to move in a northeastward direction as it dropped in intensity due to a phase of an eyewall replacement cycle. By August 6, Man-yi restrengthened and reached its second peak intensity. Thereafter, Man-yi began to weaken as its eye began to expand — and had an annular structure. On August 8, cold dry air began to wrap into the storm as it was undergoing extratropical transition. The JTWC issued their final advisory later that day, but the JMA still tracked the system until 12:00 UTC of August 9.

=== Tropical Storm Usagi ===
- Tropical storm (JMA)
- Tropical storm (SSHWS)
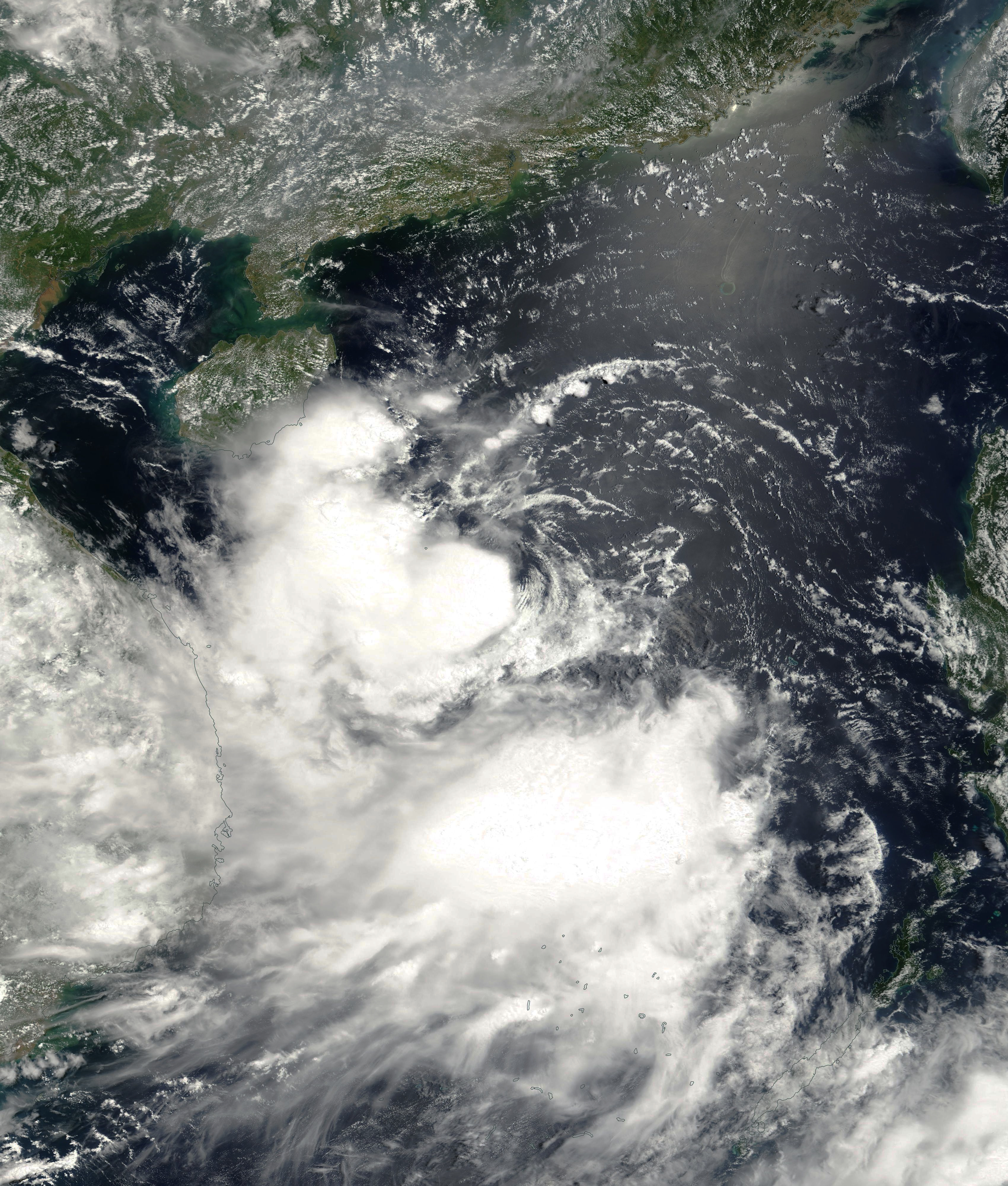
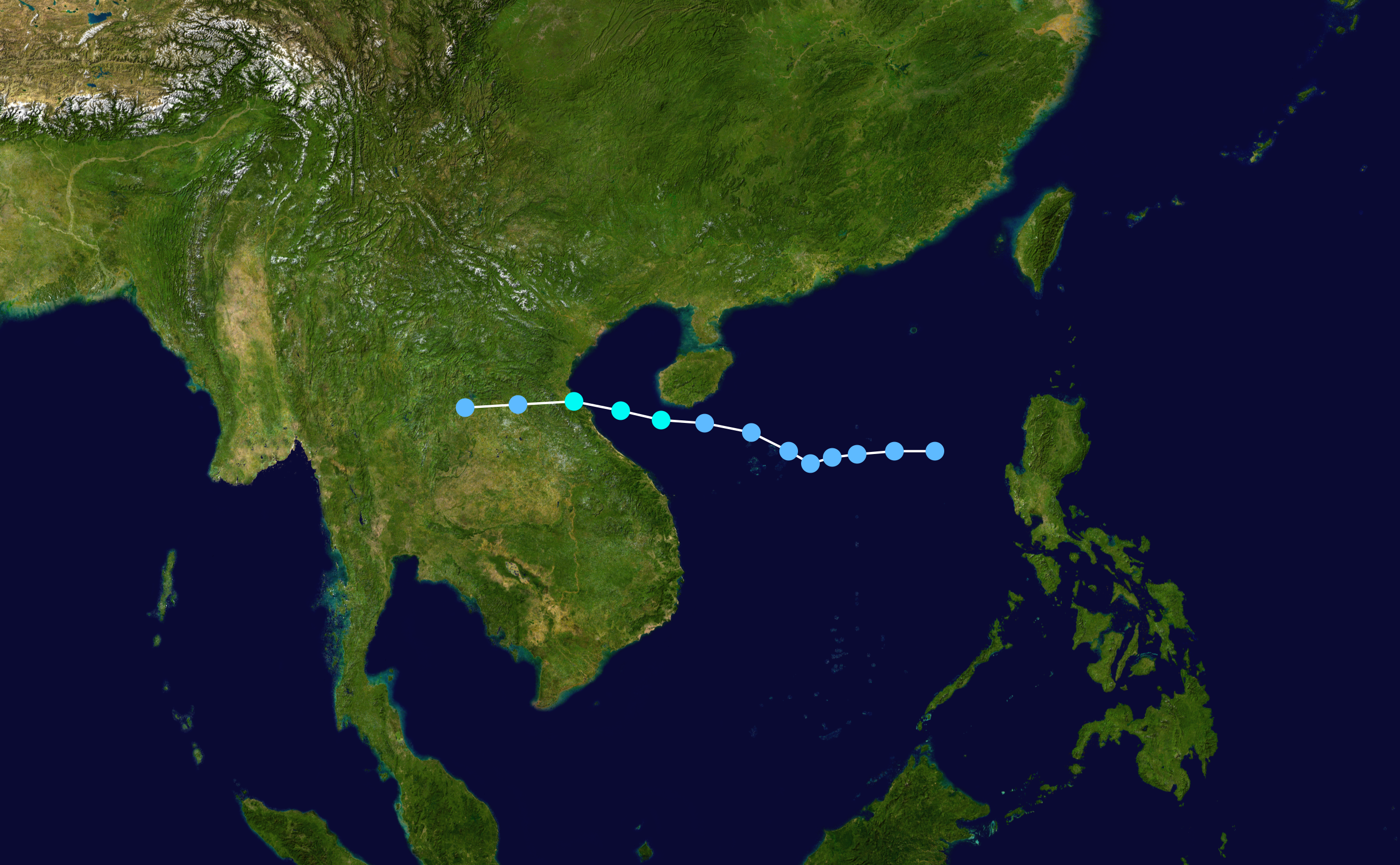
- Duration: August 8 – August 11
- Peak intensity: 65 km/h (40 mph) (10-min); 992 hPa (mbar)

A weak tropical depression had persisted in the South China Sea, just west off Luzon on August 8. On the next day, operationally, the JTWC began on issuing advisories on the system as Tropical Depression 13W. However post-analysis showed that the system had already intensified into a tropical depression several hours earlier. Despite with an exposed center, a weak banding feature began to develop around it. Organization of the 13W improved slightly, and by August 10, the system had intensified into a tropical storm, with the JMA naming it Usagi. Usagi reached its maximum intensity only with 10-minute sustained wind speeds of 65 km/h (40 mph). By 18:00 UTC, Usagi moved inland Vietnam, just to the south of Hanoi, and therefore the JTWC issued its final advisory on the system. The storm continued moving westward over land until it was last noticed by the JMA on August 11.

The storm brought heavy rainfall and flash flooding mostly in Vietnam and Thailand. Usagi had worsened flooding in Vietnam in the month of August, with some provinces such as An Giang and Đồng Tháp being raised to flood Alarm 3 – which is emergency flood condition, due to widespread flooding that is uncontrollable. Effects from the storm were much worse in Thailand. 200,000 hectares of farmland were submerged and thousands of homes were destroyed, leaving an estimated 450,000 people homeless. Deforestation in the mountainous areas of Phetchabun province brought in massive mudslides, especially in the Lom Sak District where its effects were much worse. At least 176 people have perished from the storm in Thailand, with most of these fatalities recorded in that district alone.

=== Typhoon Pabuk ===
- Typhoon (JMA)
- Category 2 typhoon (SSHWS)
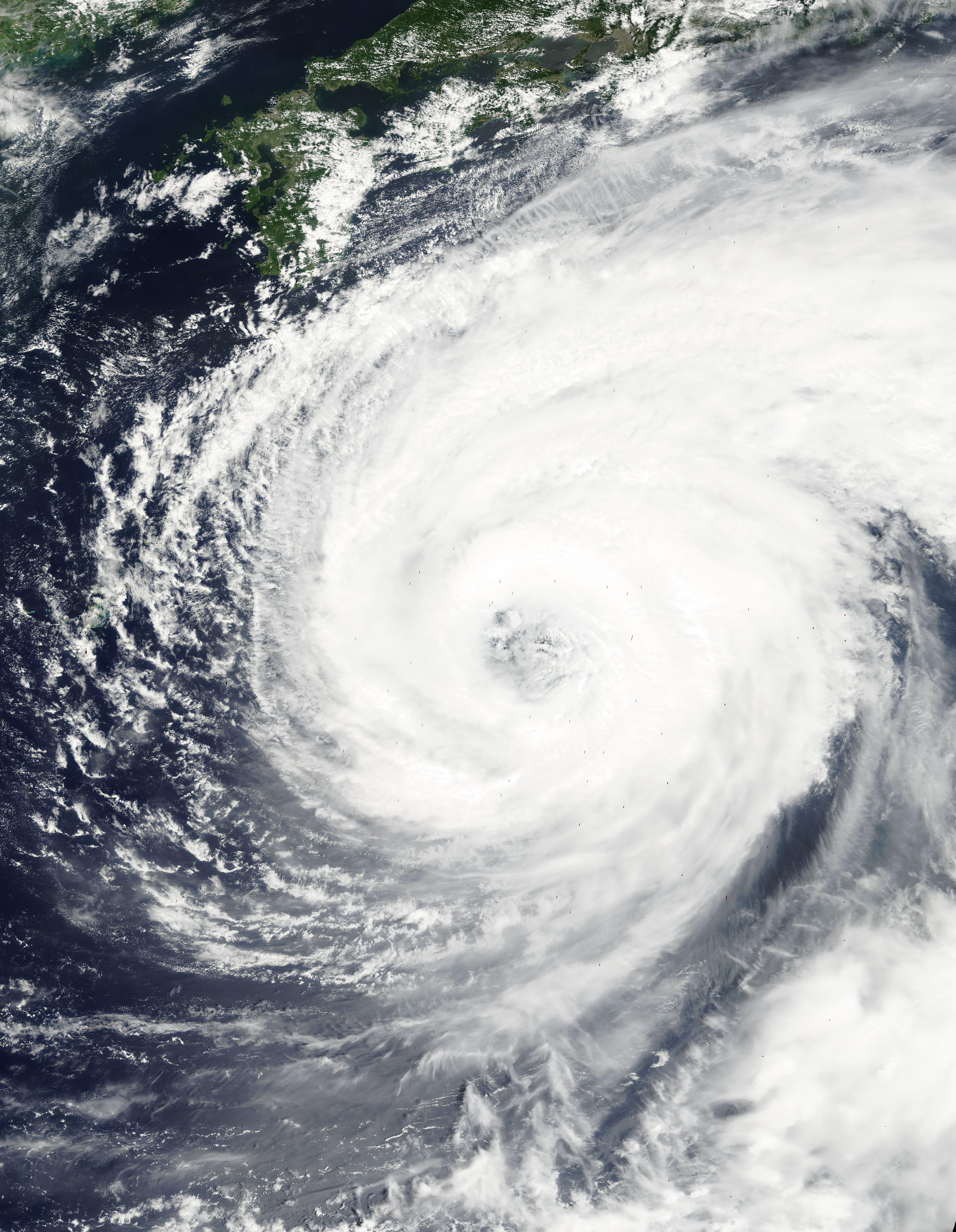
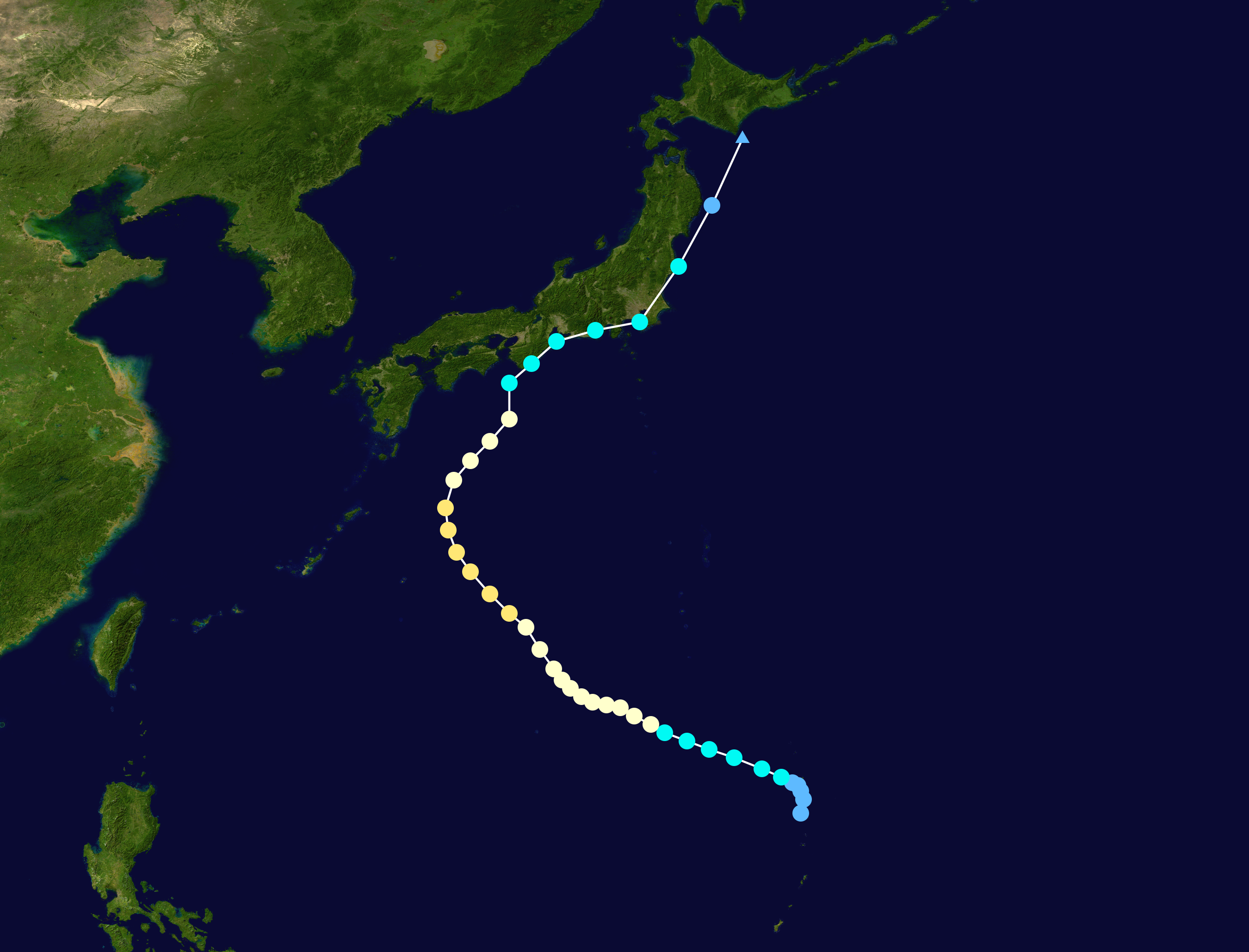
- Duration: August 13 – August 22
- Peak intensity: 130 km/h (80 mph) (10-min); 960 hPa (mbar)

On August 13, the JMA started to track a tropical depression that was embedded to the monsoon to the north-northwest of Saipan. Due to its rapid development, the JTWC issued a TCFA. The JTWC began issuing advisories; thereafter, giving the designation of 14W. All agencies upgraded 14W to a tropical storm the next day, after satellite imagery depicted a well-defined LLCC along with gale-force winds to the south of it. The JMA gave the storm the name Pabuk. Moving northwestward, Pabuk gradually intensified, and the JTWC upgraded the system to a typhoon on August 15; the JMA did the same 24 hours later. By August 17, Pabuk briefly reached its initial peak strength as a low-end Category 2 typhoon as it moved west-northwest before slowly weakening. During the next day, Pabuk began to re-intensify as a banding eye feature began to develop. Satellite animated imagery showed an eyewall forming with deep convection. By 06:00 UTC of August 19, Pabuk reached its second peak intensity with 1-minute sustained winds of 165 km/h (103 mph). The typhoon grew in size, and its eye became irregular, hinting on a weakening trend while moving north northeastward. Pabuk weakened to tropical storm intensity when it hit the southern coast of Japan, south of Osaka, on 12:00 UTC of August 21. On August 22, both the JMA and the JTWC issued its final advisory after it became extratropical.

Pabuk brought heavy rainfall in the southern part of Honshu, which flooded many homes and disrupting sea and air travel. As the typhoon was approaching, the JMA warned on heavy winds and strong gusts along the southwestern and western coastline of Japan. Heavy rainfall was forecast throughout most of the nation to as far south as Okinawa, with the Kii Peninsula being forecast to have rainfall of about 300 mm (12 in). Around 70 homes were flooded in the island of Amami Ōshima alone. Moreover, the launch of the next-generation rocket H-IIA was also halted due to stormy conditions. Throughout Japan, the storm resulted in eight fatalities and 141 injured people. 917 hectares of fields were damaged. Total damages from the typhoon amounted to ¥6.3 billion (US$52 million).

=== Typhoon Wutip ===
- Very strong typhoon (JMA)
- Category 4 super typhoon (SSHWS)
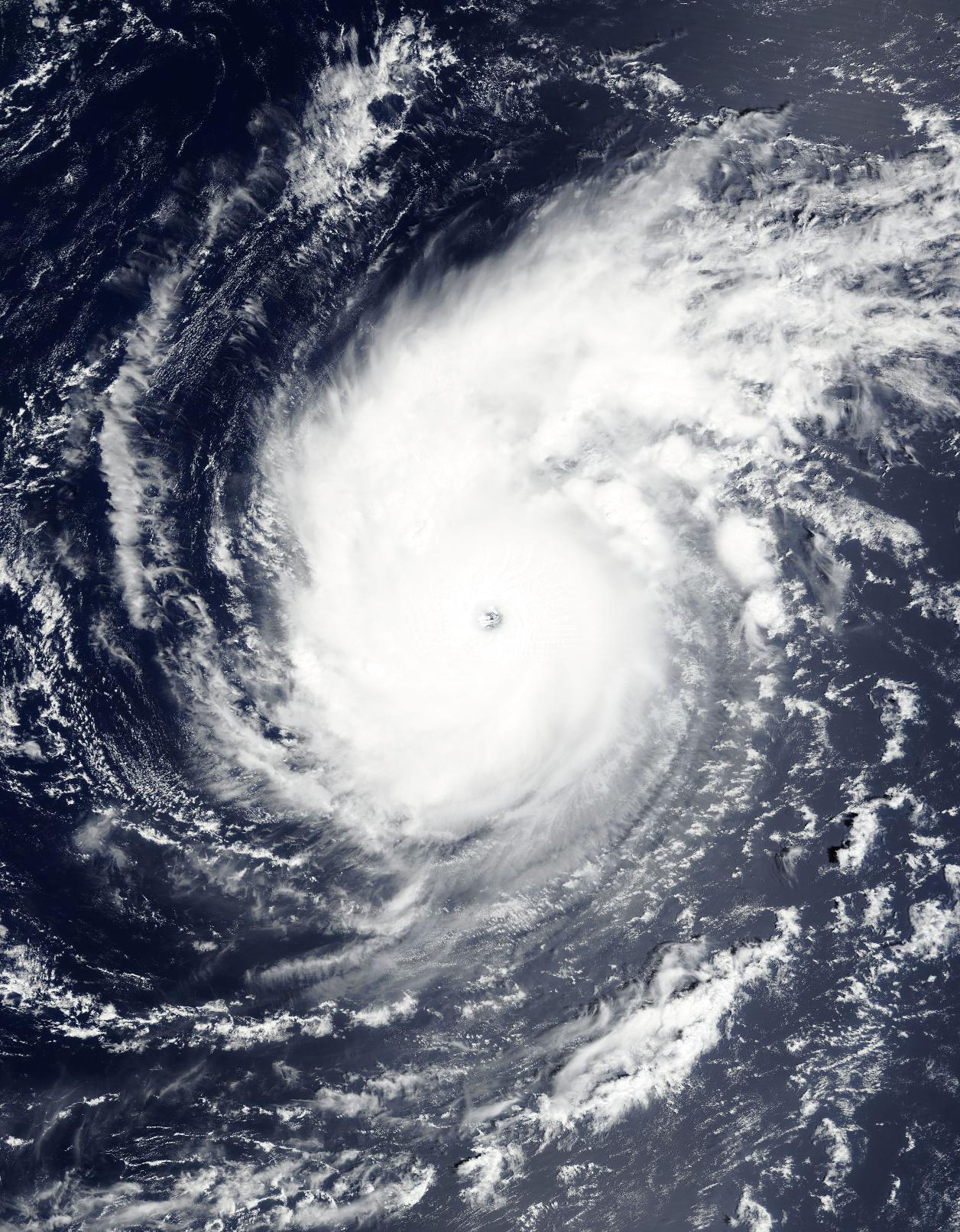
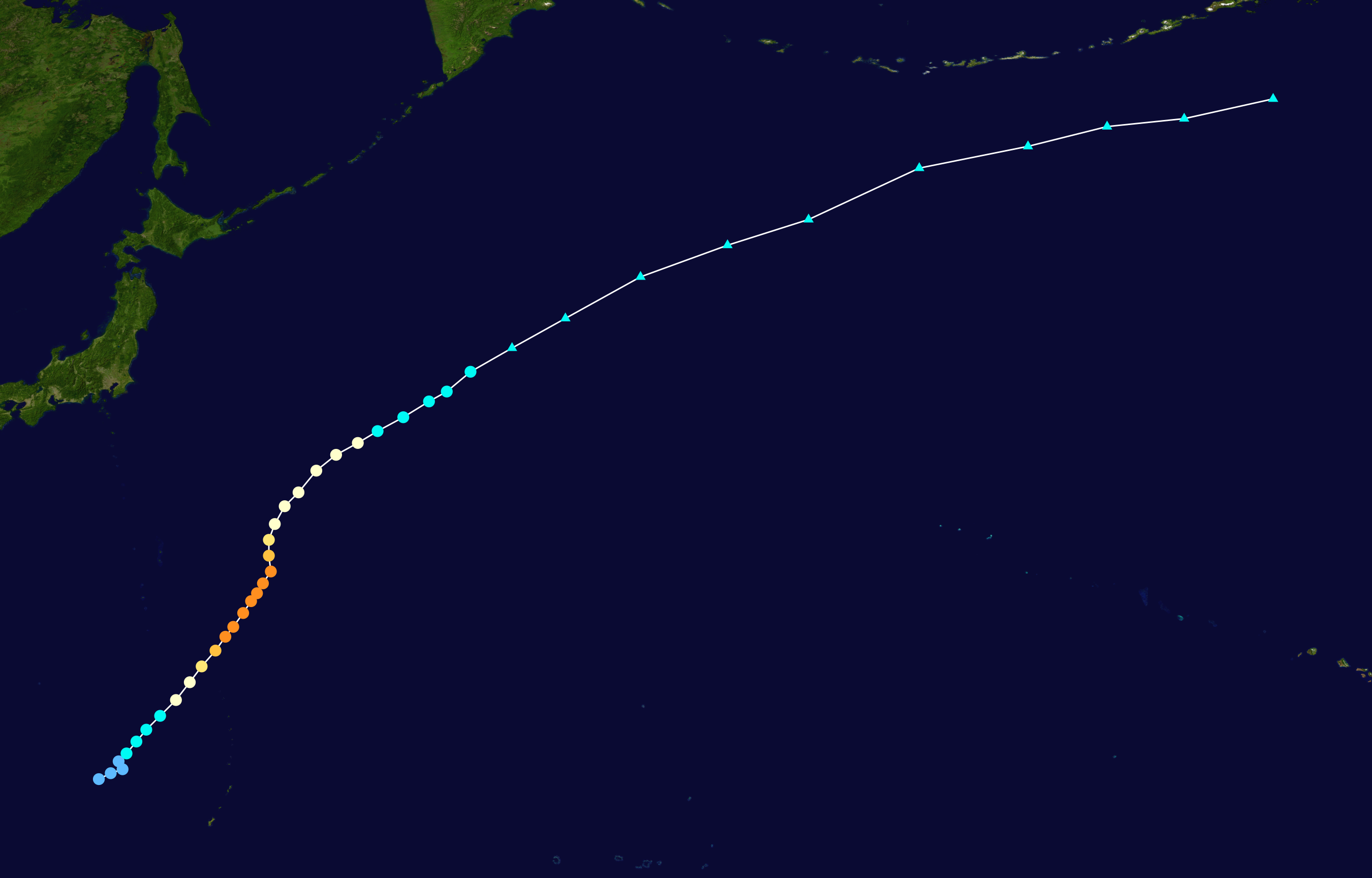
- Duration: August 26 – September 2
- Peak intensity: 165 km/h (105 mph) (10-min); 930 hPa (mbar)

A tropical disturbance that was embedded in a broad monsoonal circulation developed in the Philippine Sea on August 25. The JMA classified the system as a tropical depression on the next day. Early on August 27, the JTWC followed suit and began initiating advisories on Tropical Depression 16W, after improved organisation and increased convection. 16W quickly strengthened into a tropical storm thereafter, with the JMA naming it Wutip.

By August 28, an eye feature began to develop, forcing both agencies to quickly upgrade Wutip to a typhoon. Rapid deepening ensued for the rest of the day, and Wutip had already reached Category 4 typhoon intensity on 18:00 UTC of the same day. Wutip still strengthened until it reached super typhoon intensity on 06:00 UTC of August 29 – the first of this season – with 1-minute sustained winds of 240 km/h (150 mph) and a minimum pressure of 930 hPa. By August 30, Wutip began to weaken after its cloud tops began to warm and a reduction of convection. Wutip rapidly weakened down to tropical storm intensity by September 1, when it was already interacting with drier air, making its LLCC become exposed. Both the JMA and the JTWC issued their final advisory on 18:00 UTC of September 2, when it had weakened into an extratropical gale.

=== Tropical Storm Sepat ===
- Tropical storm (JMA)
- Tropical storm (SSHWS)
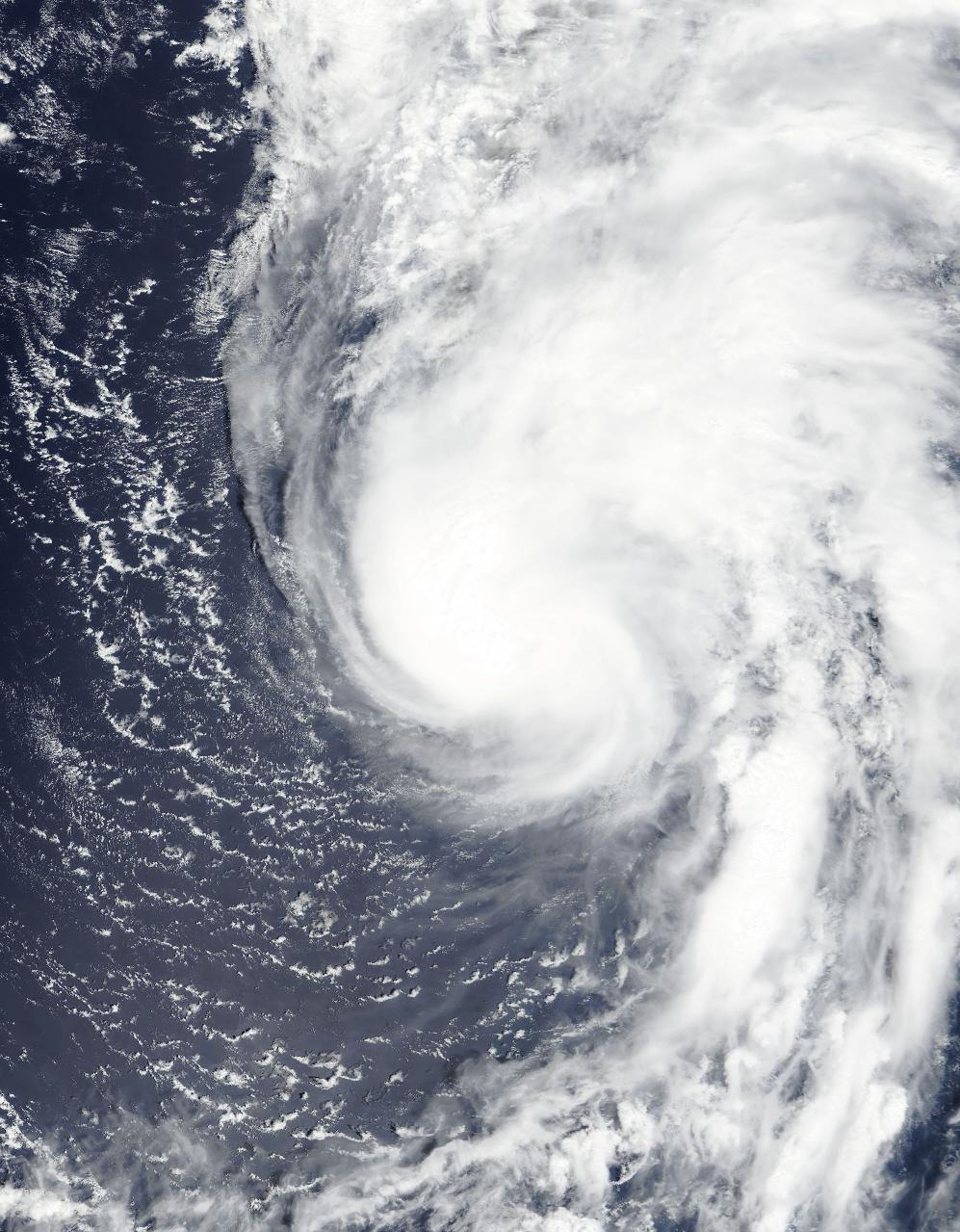
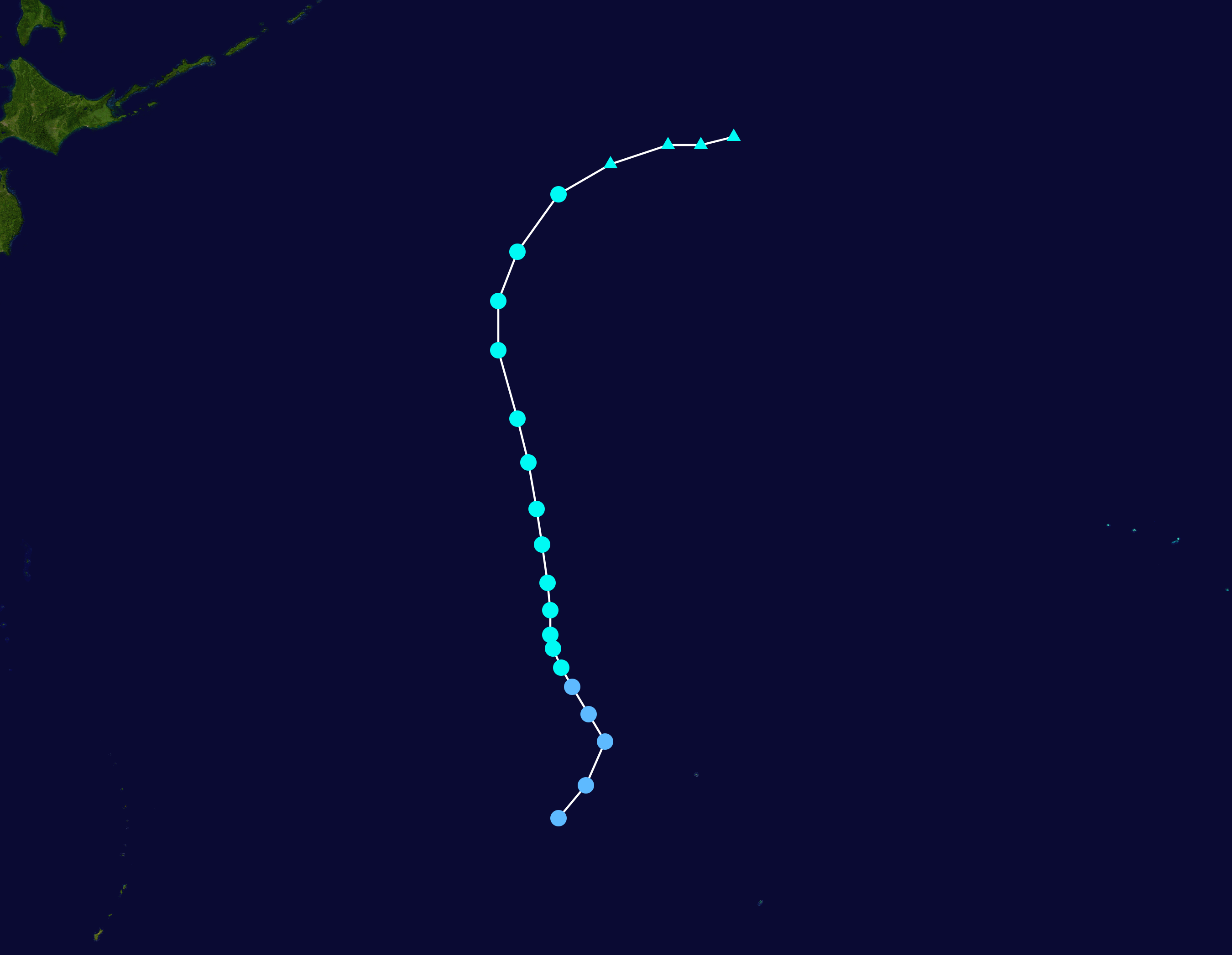
- Duration: August 26 – August 30
- Peak intensity: 85 km/h (50 mph) (10-min); 990 hPa (mbar)

Sepat originated from an extensive monsoon trough that spawned multiple vortices on August 19, to the south of Pohnpei. After moving east-northeastward in a few days, the JTWC issued a TCFA after its circulation improved in organisation on August 26. The JMA classified the system as a tropical depression around the same time. By August 27, the JTWC began initiating advisories, designating the system as Tropical Depression 17W. Now moving in a rather north-northwestward direction, 17W gained strength. Both the JMA and the JTWC upgraded the system to a tropical storm on 18:00 UTC. The JTWC had upped the system's intensity to 45 knots, hinting the Sepat had already reached its peak intensity. The JMA noted Sepat's peak intensity early on the next day. Overall convection around the storm's center had significantly decreased thereafter. On August 29, a satellite passing revealed that most of its convection had already scattered, prompting the JTWC to lower Sepat's intensity to minimal tropical storm strength. At this point, Sepat had moved far north over cooler waters. The JTWC issued its final advisory on 00:00 UTC of August 30 when they noted that it had become extratropical. The JMA followed suit twelve hours later.

=== Tropical Storm Fitow ===
- Tropical storm (JMA)
- Tropical storm (SSHWS)
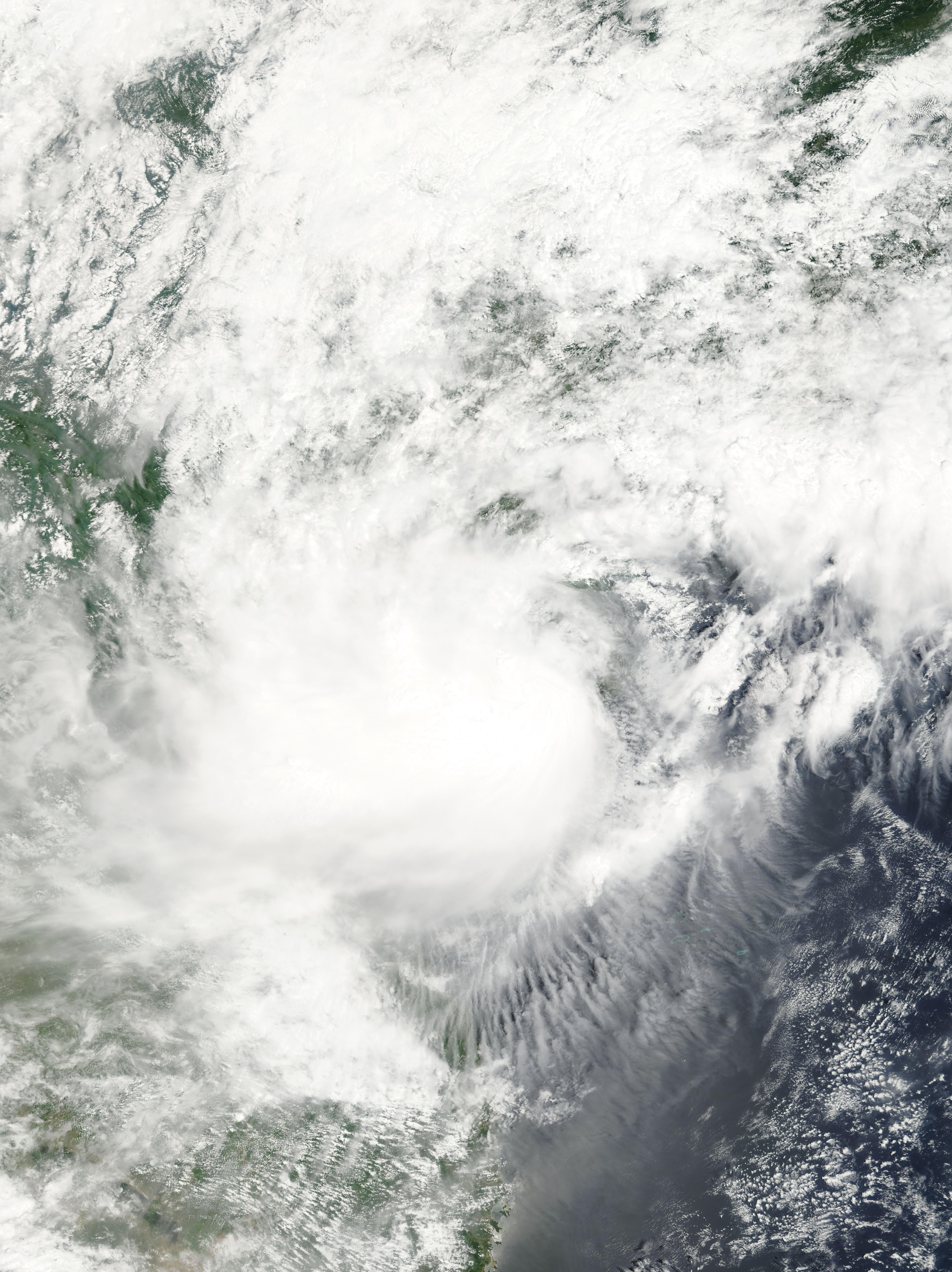
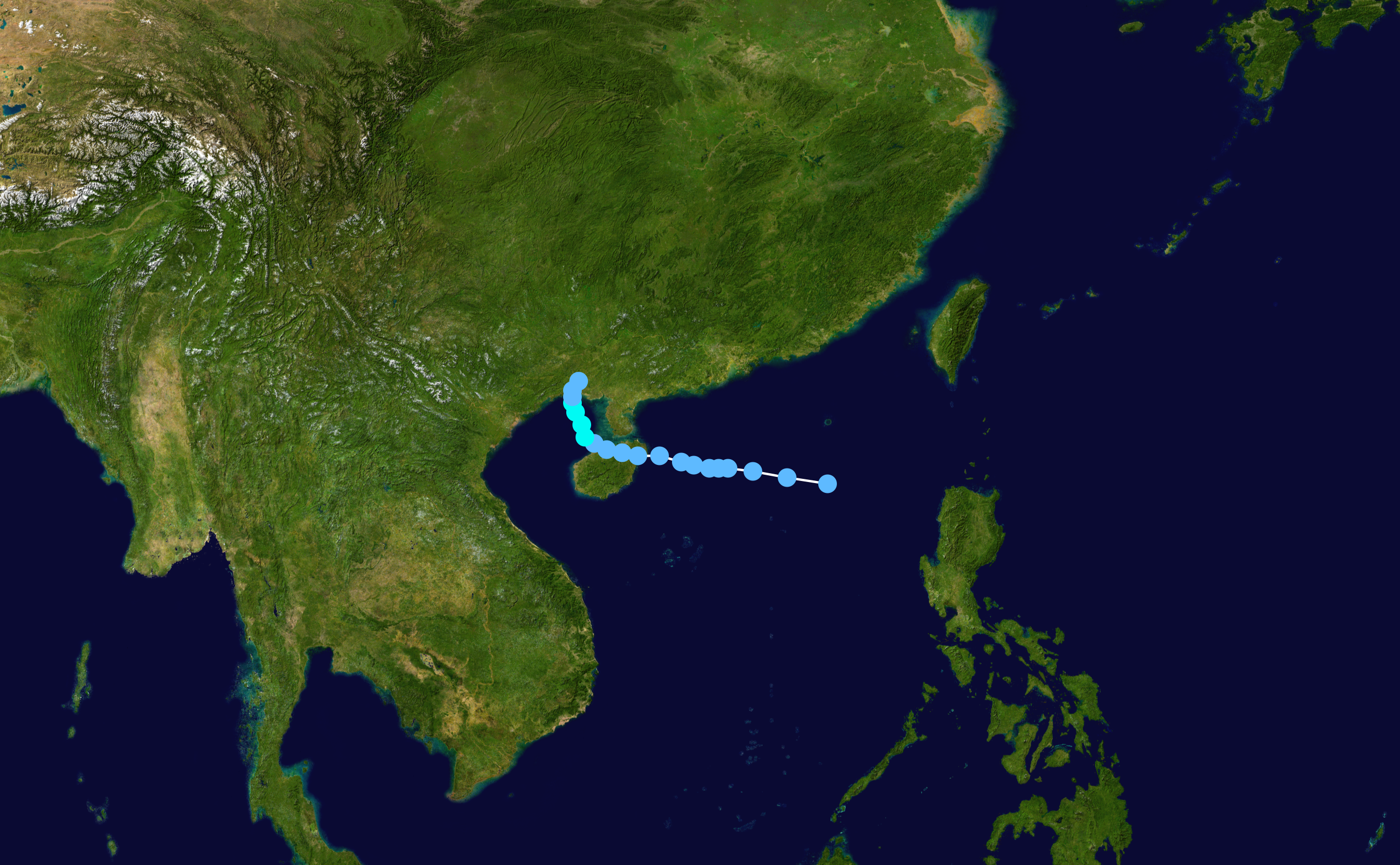
- Duration: August 28 – September 1
- Peak intensity: 65 km/h (40 mph) (10-min); 990 hPa (mbar)

Initially an area of thunderstorms formed west of Luzon late on August 26, possibly due to the remains of former Tropical Depression Jolina. Late on August 28 it formed into a tropical depression about 300 miles (480 km) south-southwest of Hong Kong. It moved west-northwest over northeastern Hainan late on August 29, before becoming a tropical storm 24 hours later. Early on August 31, the tropical storm began to drift north towards China. That evening, it struck Dongxing before weakening back into a tropical depression on September 1 and dissipating the following day.

Excessive rains fell in mainland China, with locations in Changjiang county measuring up to 831.1 mm in the 3 day period ending late on August 31. Total economic losses in Hainan were near 1.367 billion yuan (US$165.2 million). In all, 3680 houses were nearly destroyed, four died, and 3.5 million people were impacted by the tropical storm.

=== Typhoon Danas ===
- Very strong typhoon (JMA)
- Category 3 typhoon (SSHWS)
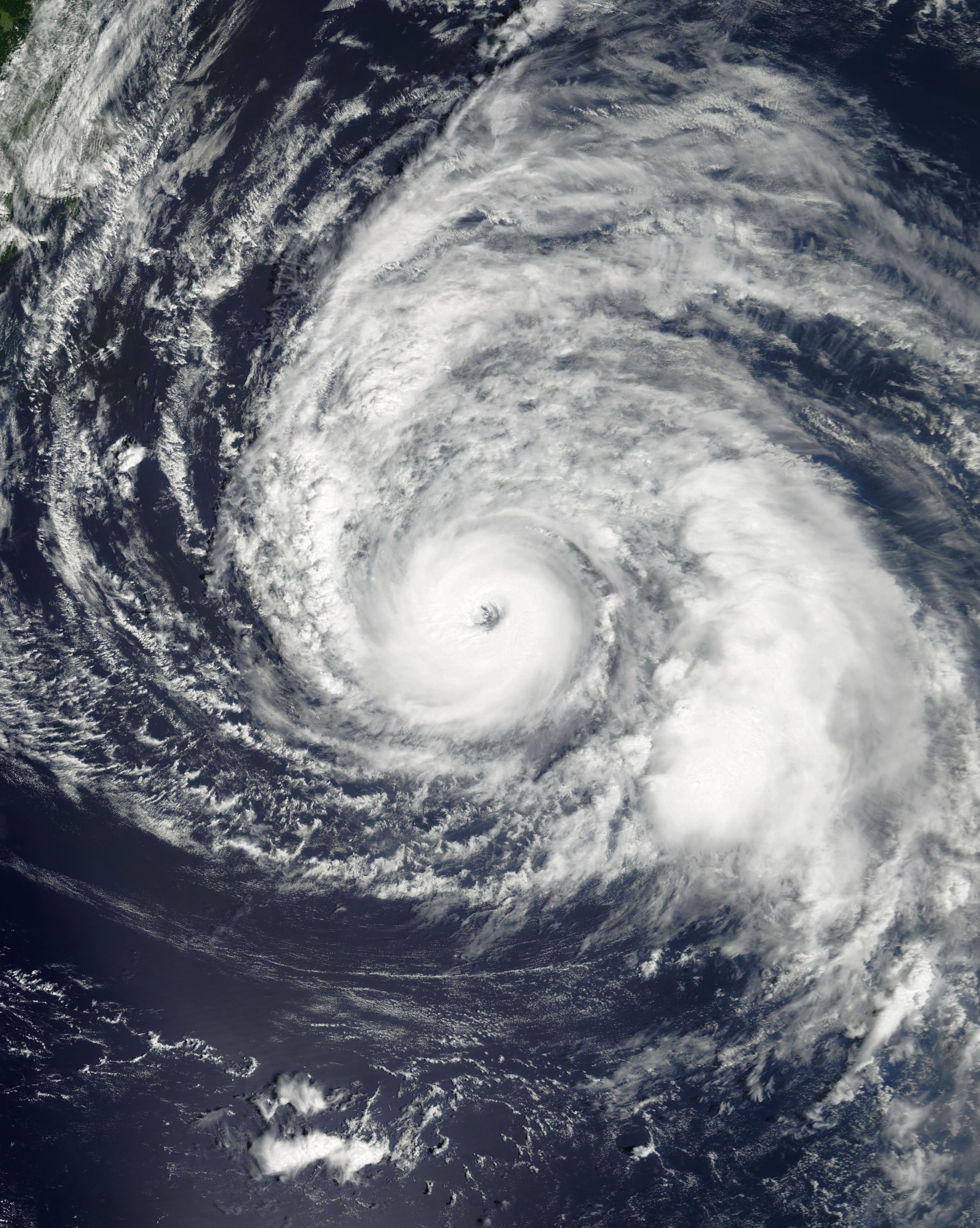
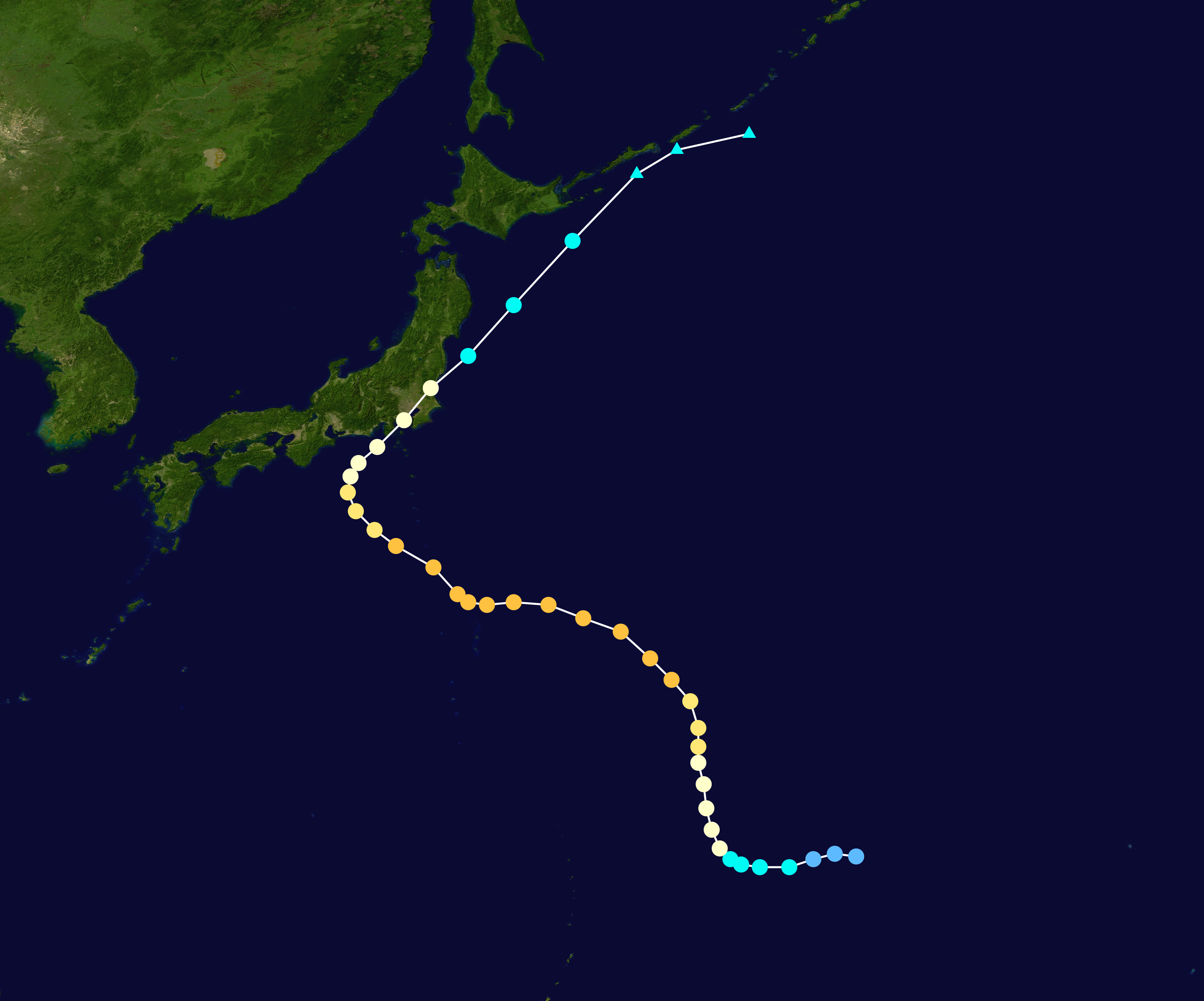
- Duration: September 3 – September 12
- Peak intensity: 155 km/h (100 mph) (10-min); 945 hPa (mbar)

An area of convection had persisted roughly 833 km (518 mi) to the west of Wake Island on September 2. Due to gradual development, the JTWC issued their first warning on 00:00 UTC of September 3, classifying the system as Tropical Depression 19W. Convective organisation continued to increase throughout the day, and both the JMA and JTWC upgraded the system to a tropical storm, naming it Danas. Moving westward, due to a subtropical ridge located to its north, Danas quickly intensified. The JTWC upgraded Danas to a minimal typhoon by 18:00 UTC of September 4, while the JMA did the same six hours later. As the typhoon began moving poleward, satellite imagery depicted on a development of a small eye with good convective banding. Hence, Danas intensified to a Category 2 typhoon. By 06:00 UTC of September 6, Danas reached peak intensity as a Category 4 typhoon – however post-analysis after the season showed that Danas only peaked as a Category 3 typhoon with 1-minute sustained winds of 195 km/h (121 mph). The typhoon maintained its intensity for the next 18 hours, until its eye became cloud-filled. Danas curved westward until a mid-latitude trough had weakened the ridge, causing the storm to move in a north-northeastward direction. The typhoon began to rapidly weaken, and by 00:35 UTC of September 11, Danas had already made landfall just to the southwest of Yokosuka. After crossing the eastern portion of Honshu, Danas weakened to a tropical storm. Both the JMA and the JTWC issued its final advisory on Danas on September 12, when it transitioned into an extratropical cyclone. Its remnants reached the Aleutian Islands two days later.

On September 10, Danas spawned a tornado near the city of Ochiai, just outside Tokyo. Along its track, the tornado damaged roofs, downed trees and injured one person. Following an assessment of the damage, the Tokyo District Meteorological Observatory ranked it as an F1 on the Fujita scale. According to reliable records, this was the eleventh tornado to touch down in the Kantō region. The town of Nikkō had recorded 870 mm (34 in) of rainfall over a four-day period. More than 140 domestic and international flights were canceled due to extreme winds and torrential rainfall. Throughout Japan, Danas was responsible for eight fatalities and injured 48 people. Damages from the storm amounted to ¥11.1 billion (US$91 million).

=== Typhoon Nari (Kiko) ===
- Typhoon (JMA)
- Category 3 typhoon (SSHWS)
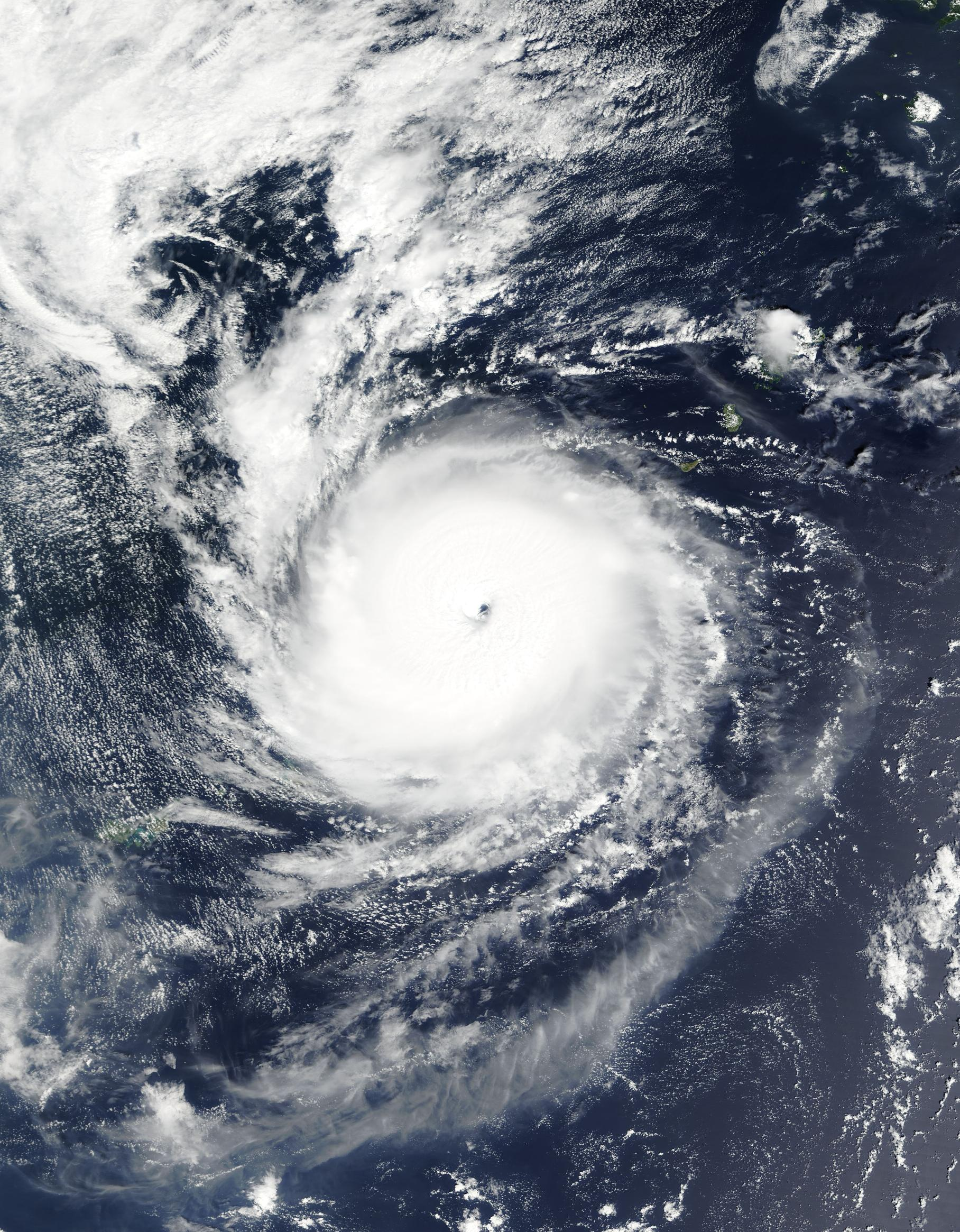
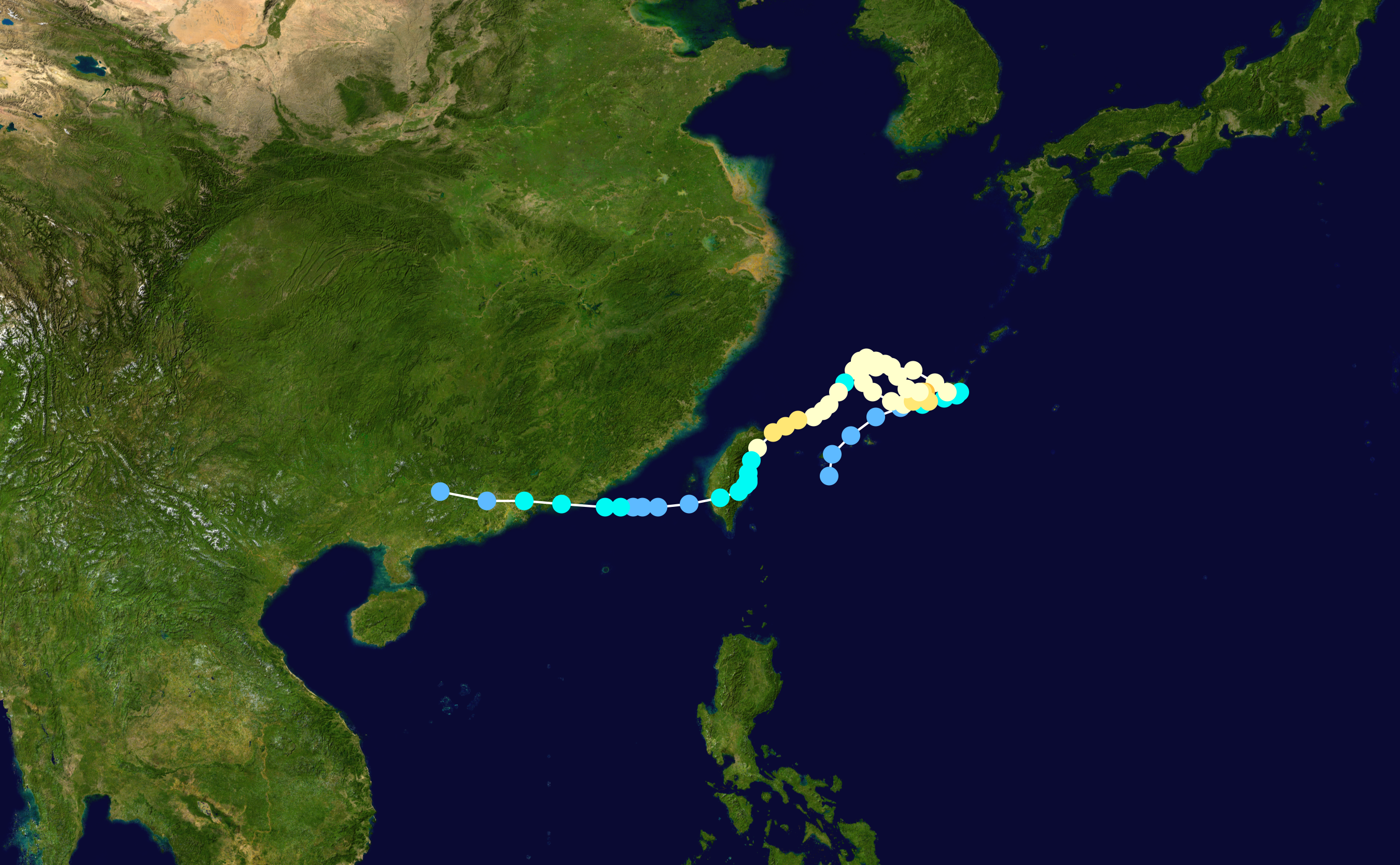
- Duration: September 5 – September 21
- Peak intensity: 140 km/h (85 mph) (10-min); 960 hPa (mbar)

On September 5, a tropical depression developed northeast of Taiwan. Weak currents, which were prevalent throughout its lifetime, caused it to drift to the northeast where it became a tropical storm on the 6th. Nari stalled near Okinawa, and became a typhoon on the 7th. Over the next 5 days, Nari executed a triple loop over open waters, reaching a peak of 115 mph (185 km/h) winds before weakening to a tropical storm on the 14th. It restrengthened to a typhoon, and as it continued southwestward, Nari reached 100 mph (160 km/h) winds before hitting northeastern Taiwan on the 16th. The storm drifted across the island, emerging into the South China Sea on the 18th as a tropical depression. It continued westward, and finally made landfall east of Hong Kong as a 65 mph (105 km/h) tropical storm on the 20th before dissipating as a tropical depression near the southern Chinese coasts.

Nari caused 92 casualties and up to 50 inches (1,300 mm) of rain led to torrential flooding.

=== Typhoon Vipa ===
- Typhoon (JMA)
- Category 1 typhoon (SSHWS)
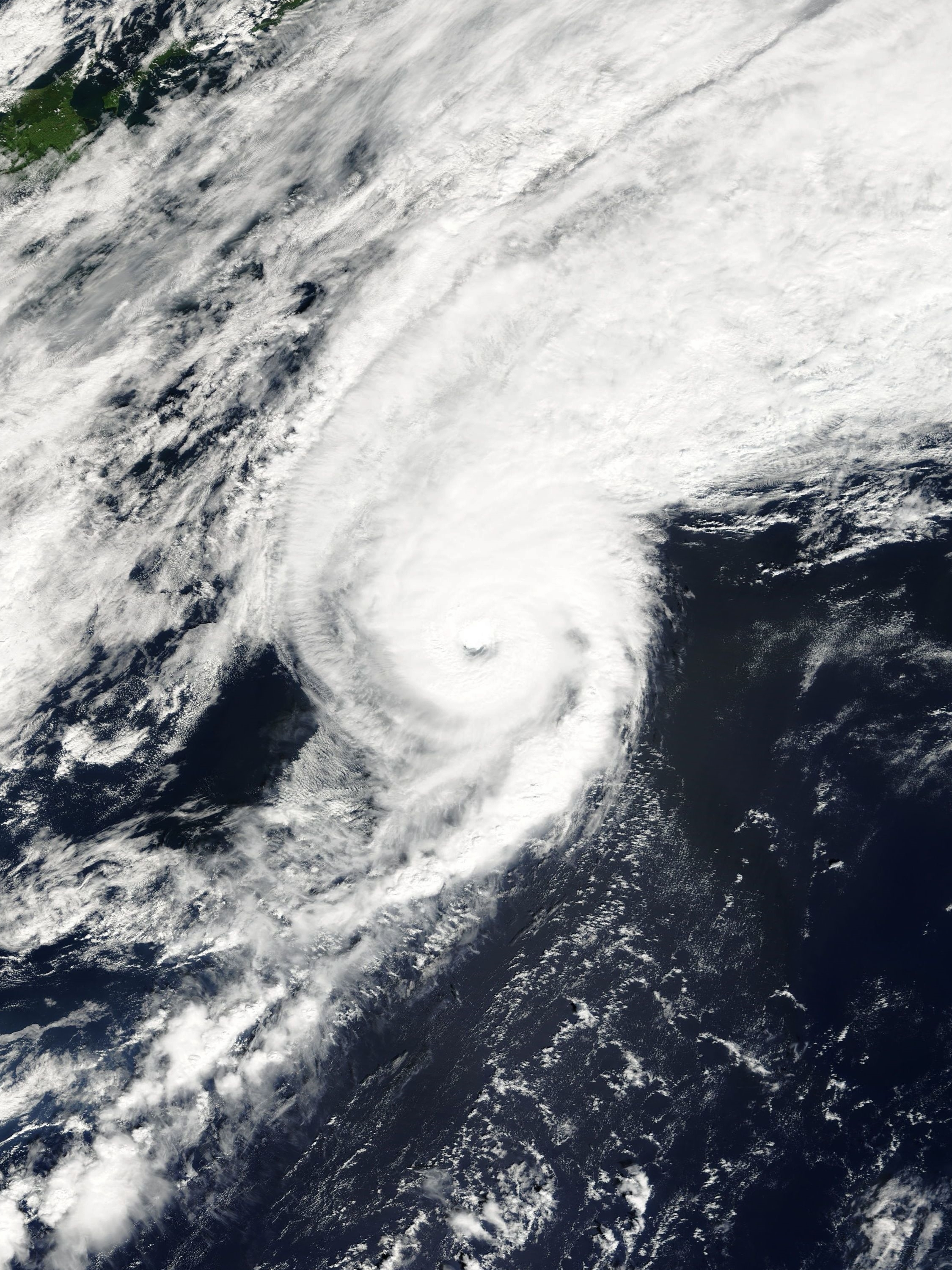
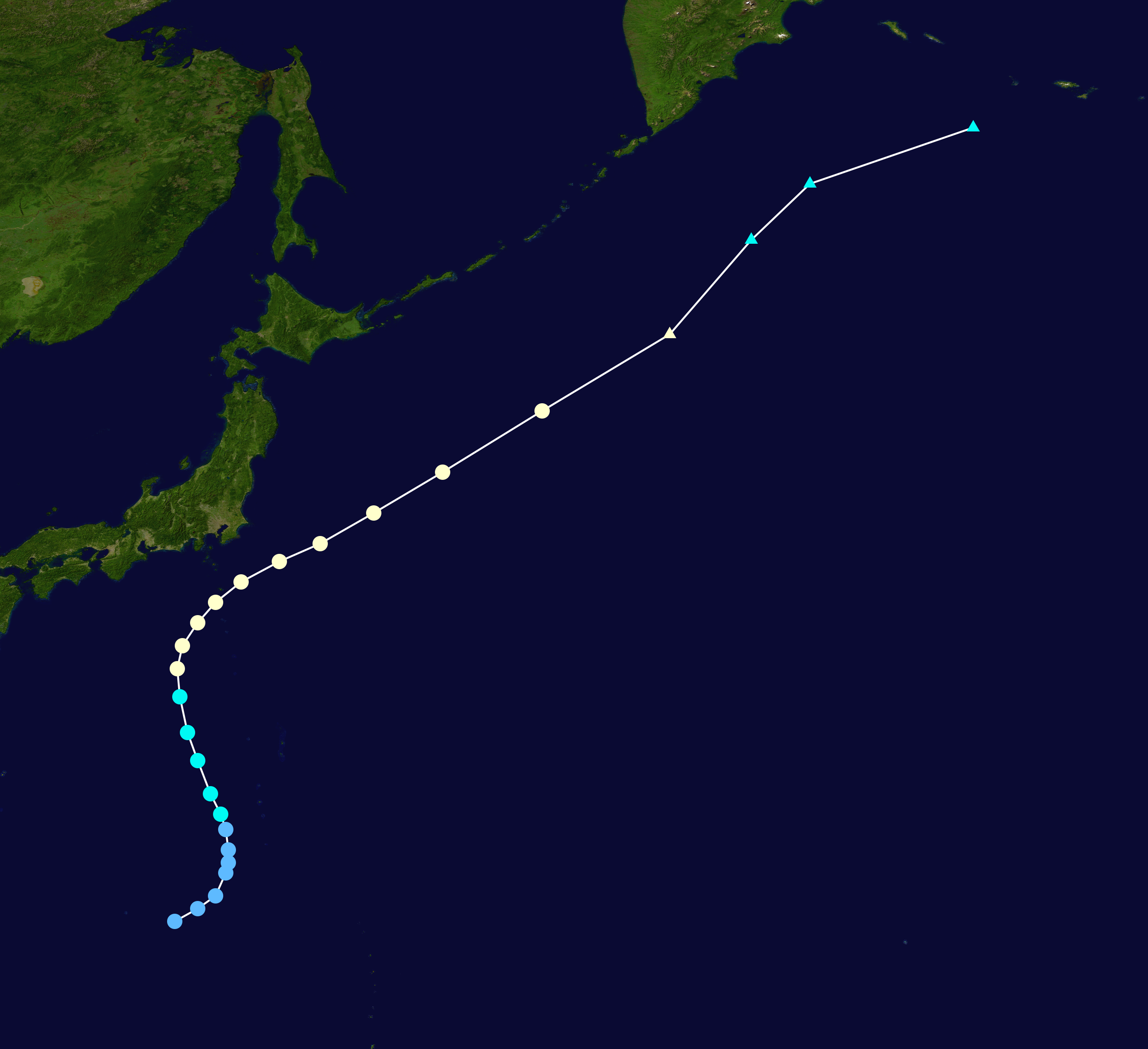
- Duration: September 17 – September 21
- Peak intensity: 120 km/h (75 mph) (10-min); 975 hPa (mbar)

Vipa originated from an upper-level low developed near Wake Island. The low began to interact with the monsoonal flow to its southwest, making it form a "monsoonal gyre" type system. On September 17 at 00:00 UTC, deep convection wrapping its LLCC led to the formation of a tropical depression, with the JTWC designating it as 21W. Organization ensued until the JTWC upgraded 21W to a tropical storm eighteen hours later. However, the JMA did not upgrade it until September 18, when it classified as Vipa. Satellite imagery depicted a small, cloud-filled eye, and thus, the JTWC upgraded the system to a minimal typhoon. The JMA upgraded Vipa into a severe tropical storm at this point. Vipa began moving northeastward when the typhoon reached its peak intensity of 1-minute sustained winds of 140 km/h (87 mph) on September 19. Vipa began to weaken as the JTWC signalized the beginning of an extratropical transition. However, its eye had enlarged, and Vipa reached its second peak intensity. The agency briefly upgraded Vipa into a typhoon, on September 20. On September 21, Vipa's eyewall began to deteriorate due to dry air. Both agencies issued their final advisory that day when Vipa had already transitioned into an extratropical cyclone. The remnants of Vipa was last noted in the Bering Sea two days later.

=== Typhoon Francisco ===
- Very strong typhoon (JMA)
- Category 3 typhoon (SSHWS)
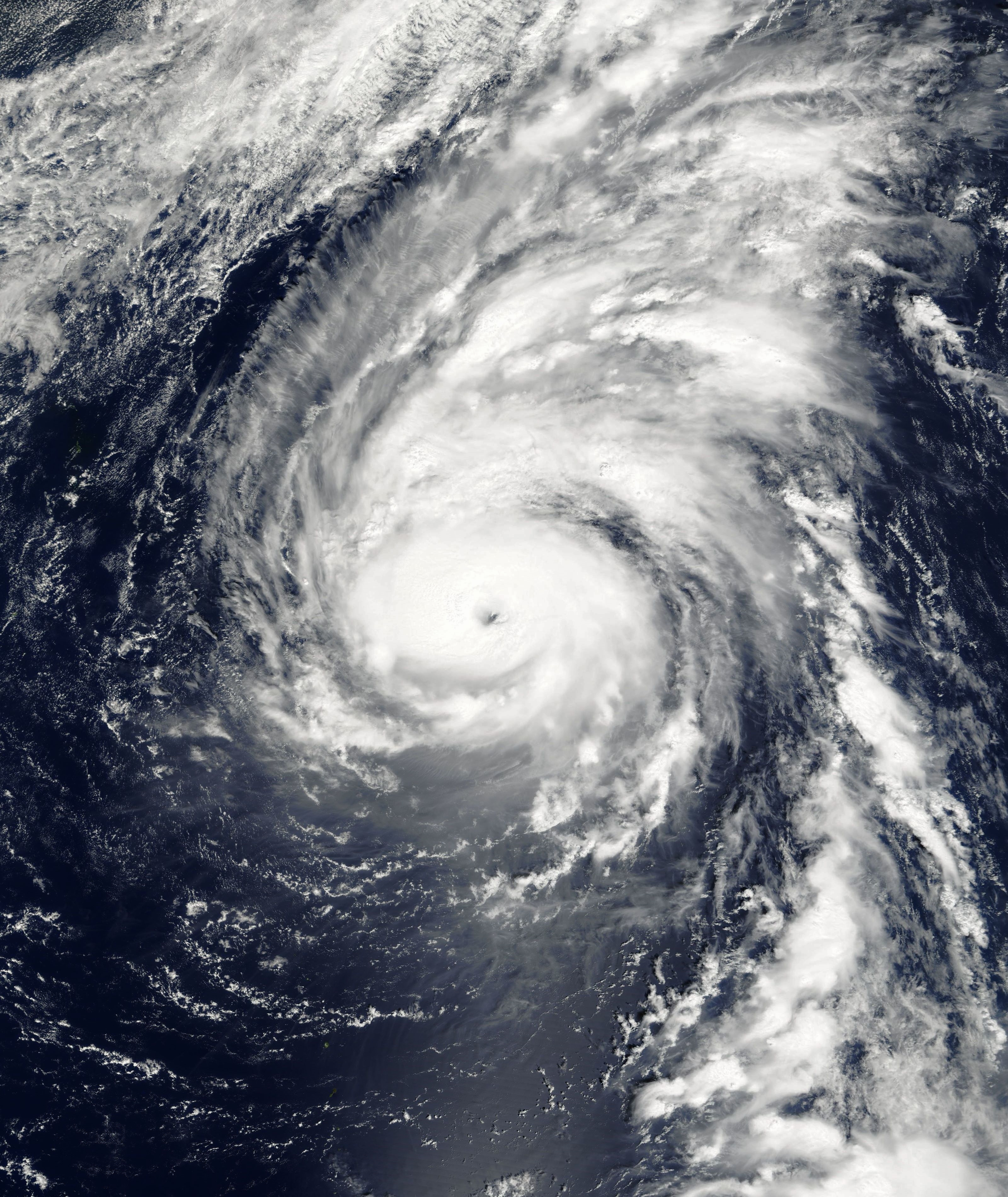
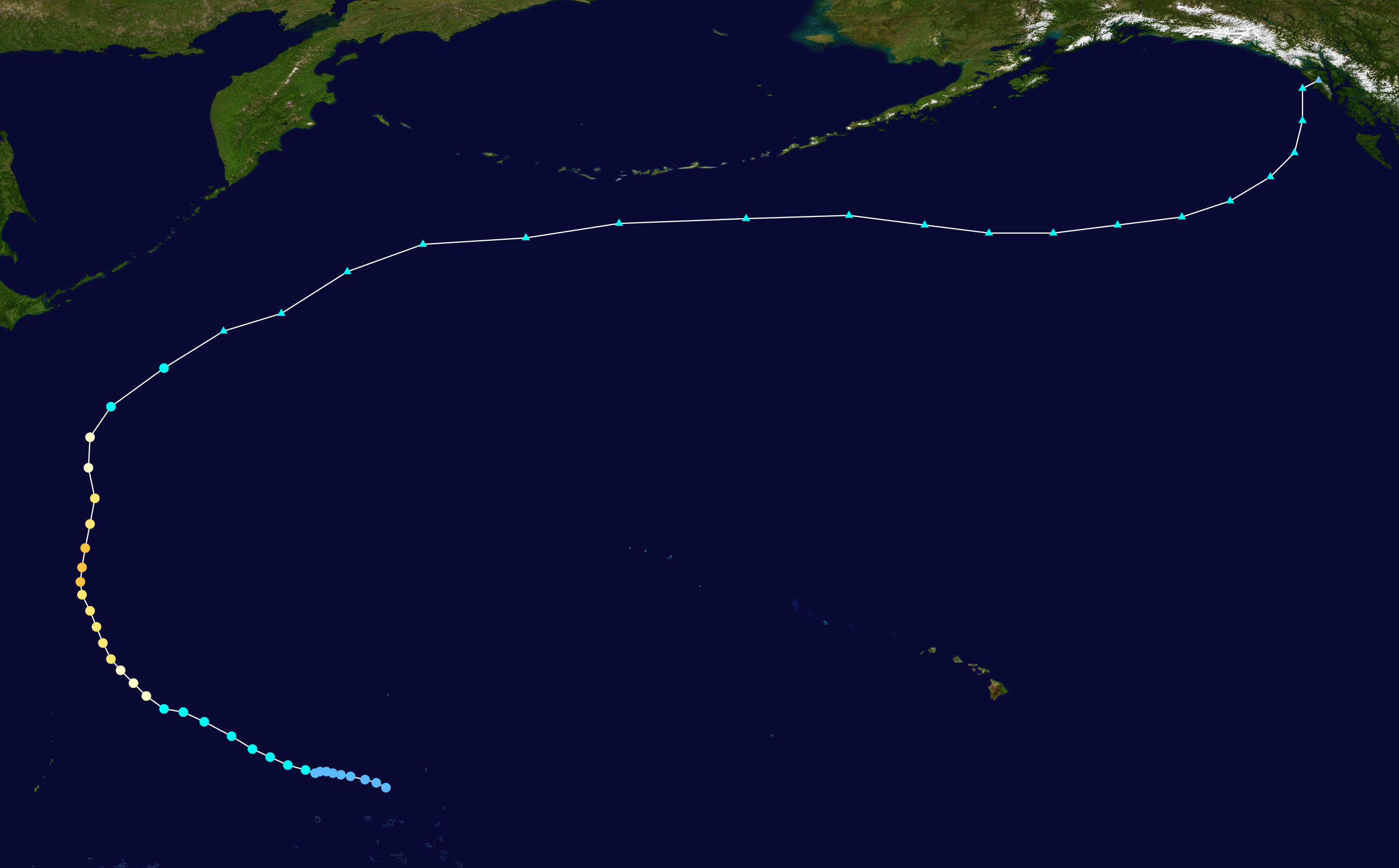
- Duration: September 18 – September 25
- Peak intensity: 155 km/h (100 mph) (10-min); 945 hPa (mbar)

On 00:00 UTC of September 18, the JMA began to monitor on a tropical depression that had developed about 509 km (316 mi) south-southeast of Wake Island. The JTWC followed suit on the next day, when they began issuing advisories on Tropical Depression 22W. 22W moved in a slow westward direction, when the JTWC upgraded the system to a tropical storm. By 00:00 UTC of September 20, the JMA followed suit and named it Francisco. Throughout the day, the convection had gradually build up, prompting the JTWC to quickly upgrade the storm to a typhoon by 12:00 UTC. Continued development caused Francisco to reach Category 2 typhoon intensity, as it began moving northward. On September 23, a ragged eye developed and was becoming clearer, and thus, the JTWC to upgrade Francisco to a Category 3 typhoon, with 1-minute sustained winds of 185 km/h (115 mph). Francisco reached its peak intensity that day, with a minimum barometric pressure of 945 hPa. However, by September 24, Francisco's convection had weakened, signalling a phase of rapid weakening. Both agencies downgraded Francisco to a tropical storm on the next day and issued their final advisories when the storm was becoming extratropical. Francisco's extratropical remnants was last seen on September 27 when it crossed the International Dateline.

=== Typhoon Lekima (Labuyo) ===
- Typhoon (JMA)
- Category 2 typhoon (SSHWS)
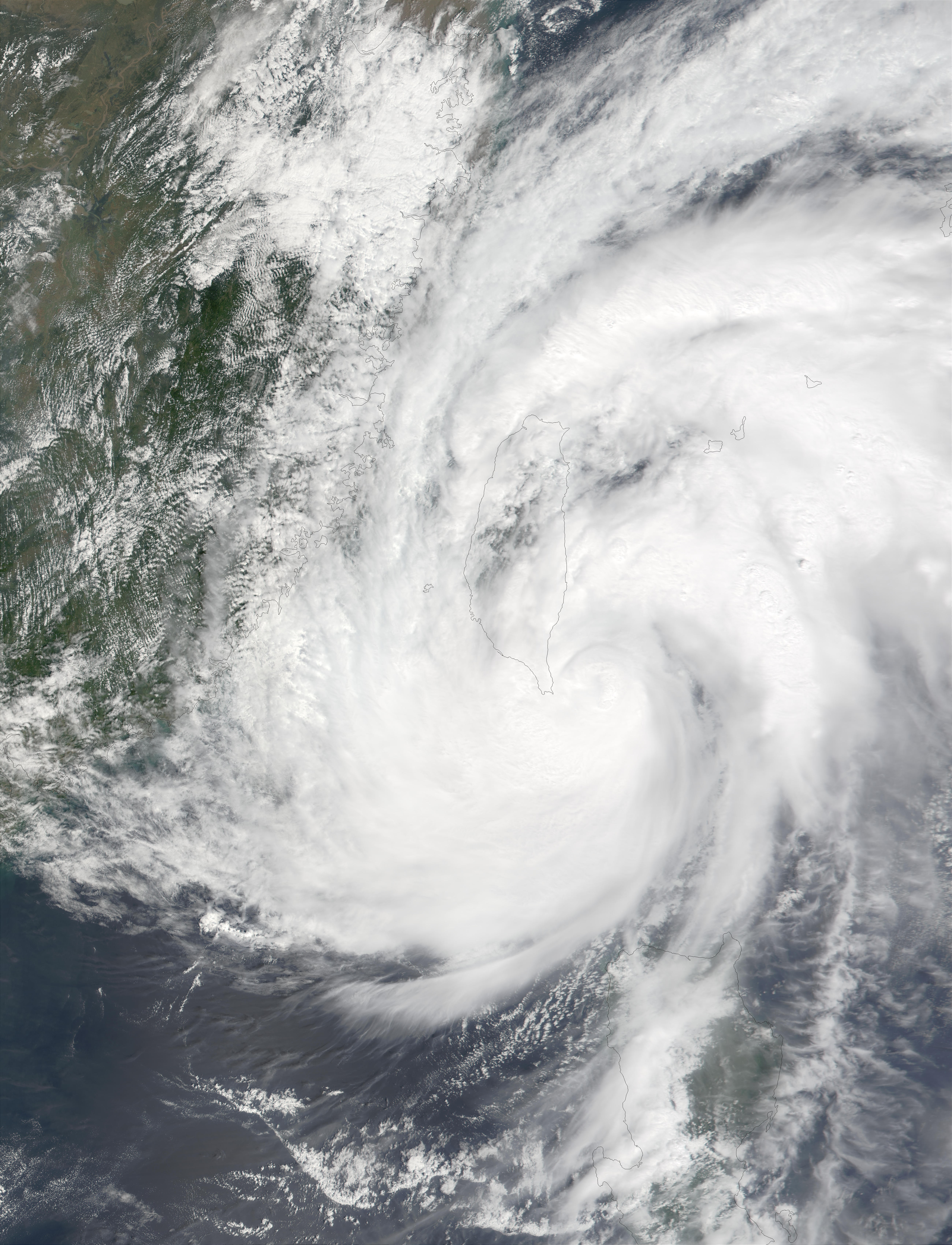
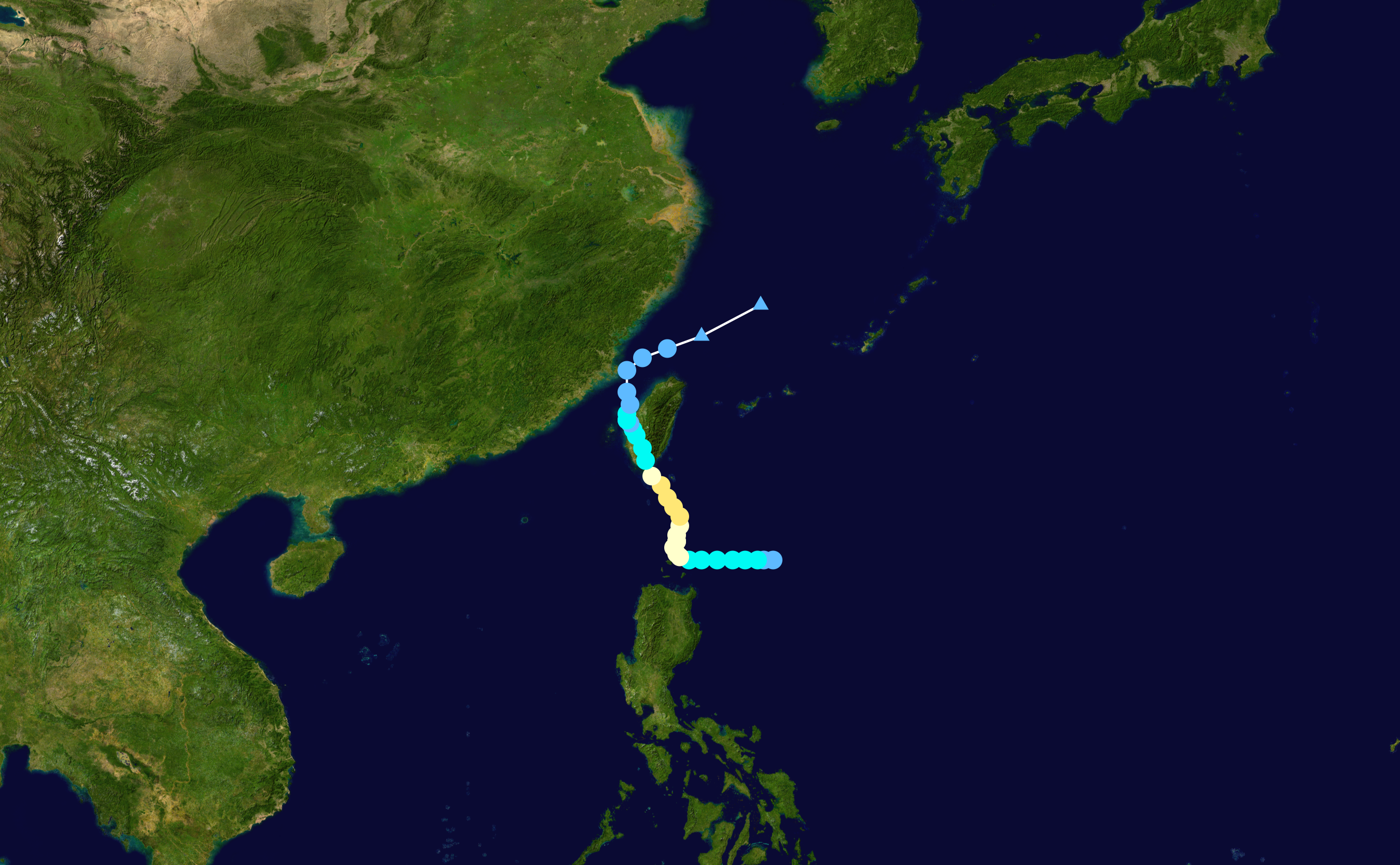
- Duration: September 22 – September 30
- Peak intensity: 130 km/h (80 mph) (10-min); 965 hPa (mbar)

Late on September 19, an area of convection associated with a monsoon trough had developed east of Luzon. By 00:00 UTC of September 22, both the JMA and the JTWC began tracking on the system, when it developed into a tropical depression, designating it as 23W. The PAGASA followed suit and gave the local name Labuyo. Later that day, the system quickly organised into a tropical storm while raining quasi-stationary, with the JMA naming it as Lekima. Subsequently, the storm began to move in a west-northwestward motion. With steady development, Lekima reached typhoon intensity on September 23. Satellite imagery had later depicted a small eye that was surrounded by convective bands. The JTWC upgraded Lekima to a Category 2-equivalent typhoon on September 25, and reached its peak intensity on 00:00 UTC of September 26, with 1-minute sustained winds of 175 km/h (109 mph). Lekima made landfall near the city of Dawu, nine hours later. Shortly thereafter, due to the mountainous terrains of Taiwan, Lekima's structure had rapidly deteriorated and the typhoon had weakened back into a tropical storm. On September 27, Lekima further weakened to a tropical depression as it moved further north of the island. However, the JTWC re-upgraded Lekima back to a minimal tropical storm for a twelve-hour period on September 28, before weakening again as it moved over the western waters of the island. Lekima moved northward, then northeastward, before dissipating on September 30.

The typhoon caused severe impacts in Taiwan as what Nari did a few weeks earlier. Torrential rainfall was experienced throughout many counties, and even some were recorded in the Fujian province. 5,600 people experienced lossage of power while landslides blocked highways due to the slow and erratic movement of the storm. Two fishermen drowned at sea with another person on board presumed drowned. In the Philippine archipelago of Luzon, one person drowned in a river due to heavy rainfall. Another fatality was seen in mainland China, where a person died in the province of Zhejiang due to a landslide on September 29.

=== Typhoon Krosa ===
- Typhoon (JMA)
- Category 3 typhoon (SSHWS)
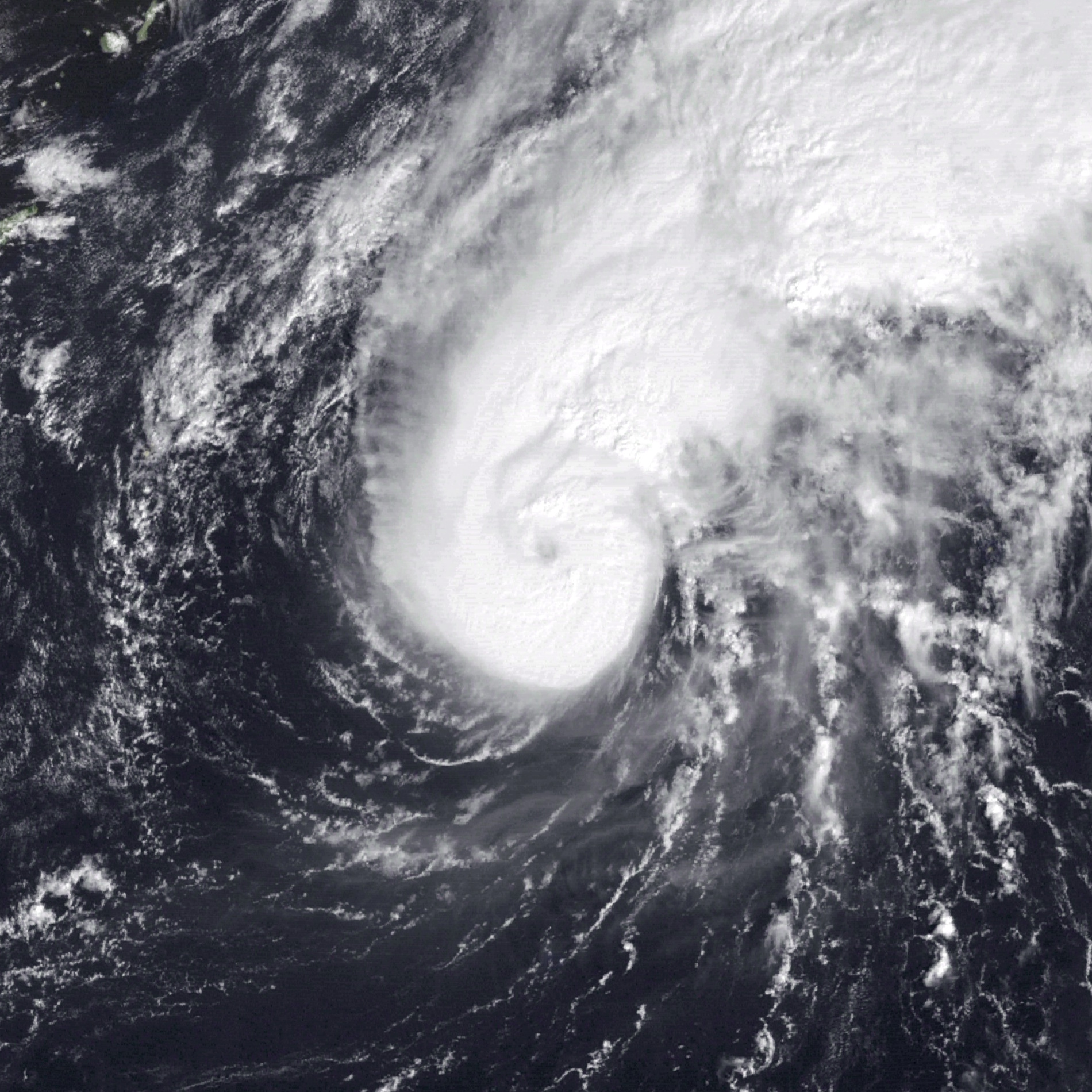
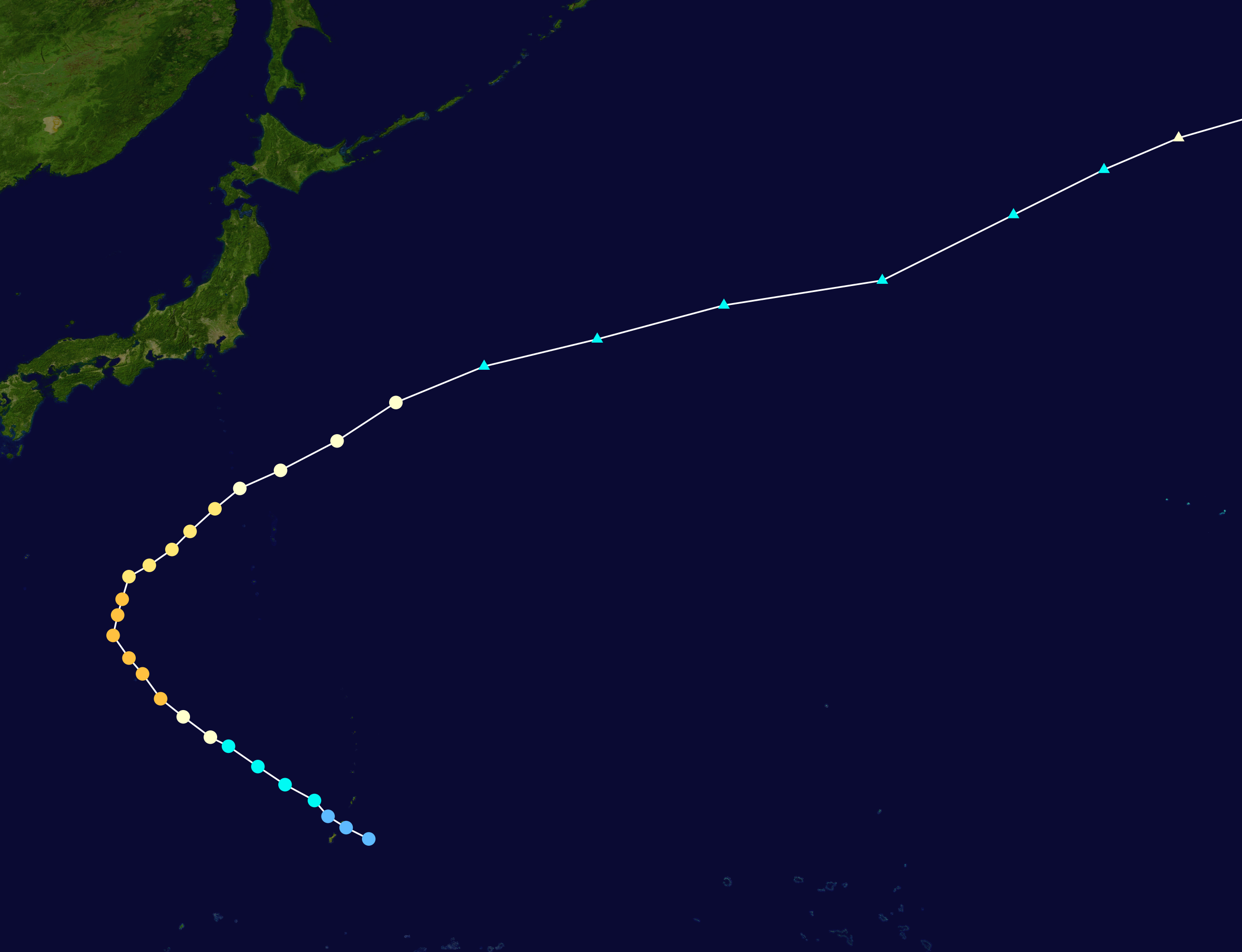
- Duration: October 3 – October 9
- Peak intensity: 150 km/h (90 mph) (10-min); 950 hPa (mbar)

A rapidly developing area of convection near Guam led to the formation of Tropical Depression 24W on October 3. Deep convection continued to form and the system strengthened into a tropical storm the next day, with the JMA naming it as Krosa. Krosa moved in a quickly paced northwestward direction and entered an area of favourable environments. Later that day, the JMA upgraded Krosa to a severe tropical storm, and quickly into typhoon on October 5. The system began to undergo a period of rapid intensification, in which Krosa reached its peak intensity as a Category 3-equivalent typhoon with 1-minute sustained winds of 195 km/h (121 mph) on 12:00 UTC. Krosa began to curve northward, then northeastward thereafter, when its convective structure had slightly weakened. At this time, the JMA considered Krosa to reach its peak intensity. Within the next two days, Krosa continued to weaken as it encountered increasing wind shear from the mid-latitude westerlies. By October 9, both the JMA and the JTWC issued their final warning on Krosa, as the storm moved into the baroclinic zone and became extratropical.

=== Typhoon Haiyan (Maring) ===
- Typhoon (JMA)
- Category 2 typhoon (SSHWS)
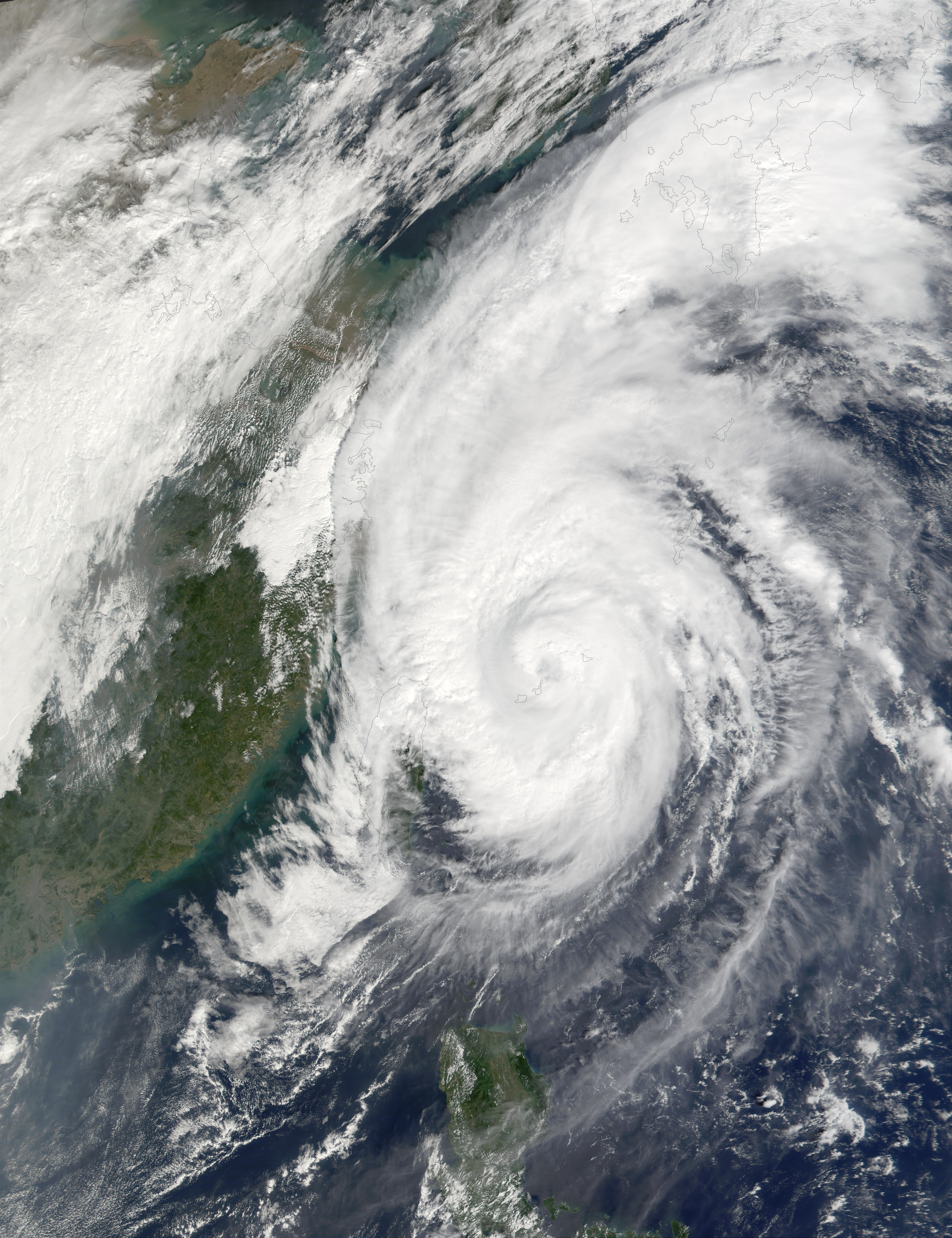
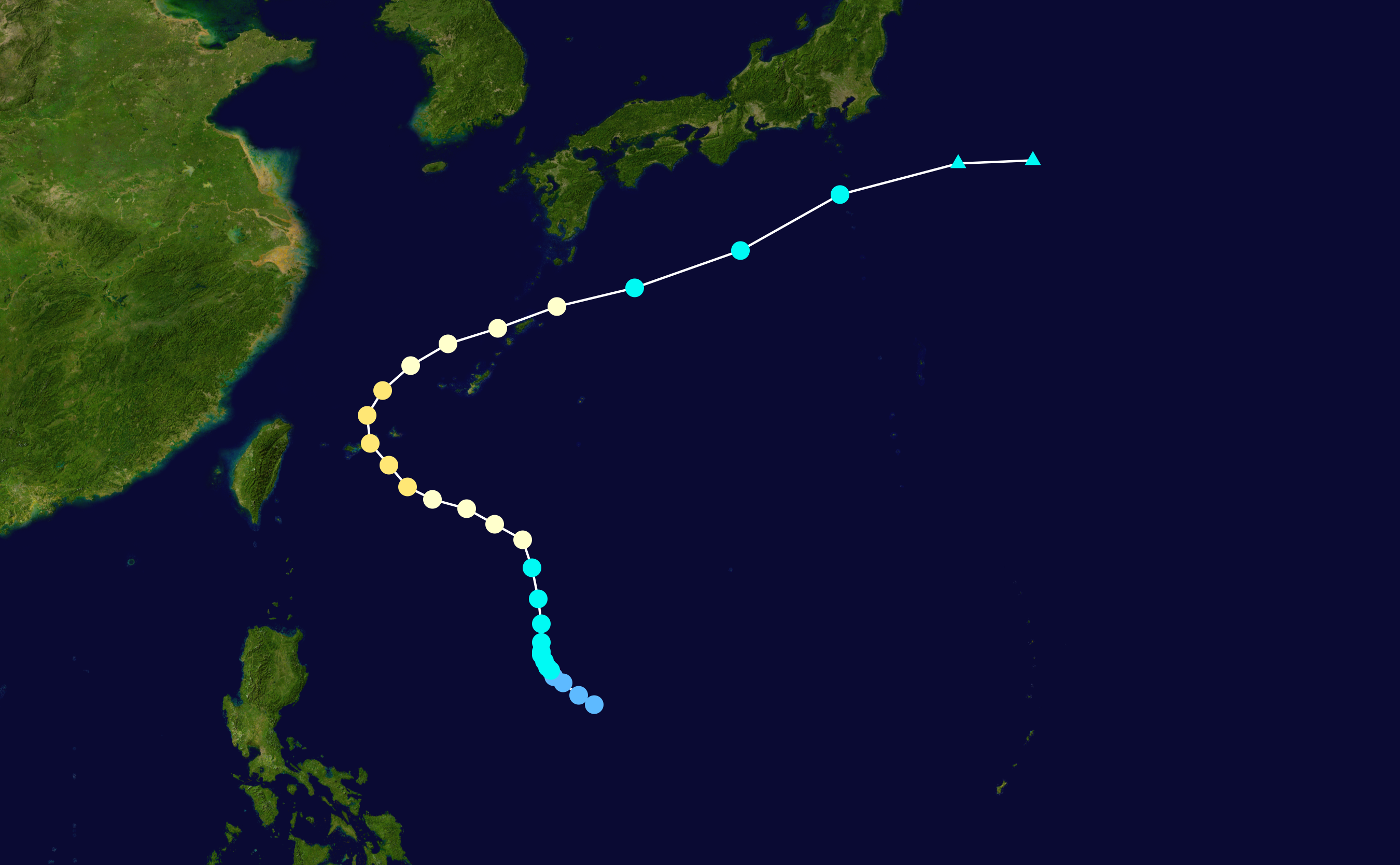
- Duration: October 11 – October 18
- Peak intensity: 130 km/h (80 mph) (10-min); 960 hPa (mbar)

Tropical Depression 25W formed over the Philippine Sea on October 11. The PAGASA named it as Maring 3 hours later. Maring steadily moved northwards due to an intensifying high-pressure area moving southwestwards, as the JTWC upgraded it to a tropical storm on October 13. In the same time, Maring became Tropical Storm Haiyan. The next day, the three agencies, upgraded it to a typhoon. Typhoon Haiyan reached peak intensity with winds equivalent to Category 2 strength on October 15. As the high-pressure moved westwards, Haiyan rapidly weakened to a minimal typhoon and moved westwards too, affecting Taiwan. Haiyan finally dissipated on October 18.

Throughout Japan and the Ryukyu Islands, two people were killed by the typhoon and another was injured. Damage from the storm amounted to 296.024 million yen (US$3.4 million).

=== Typhoon Podul ===
- Very strong typhoon (JMA)
- Category 5 super typhoon (SSHWS)
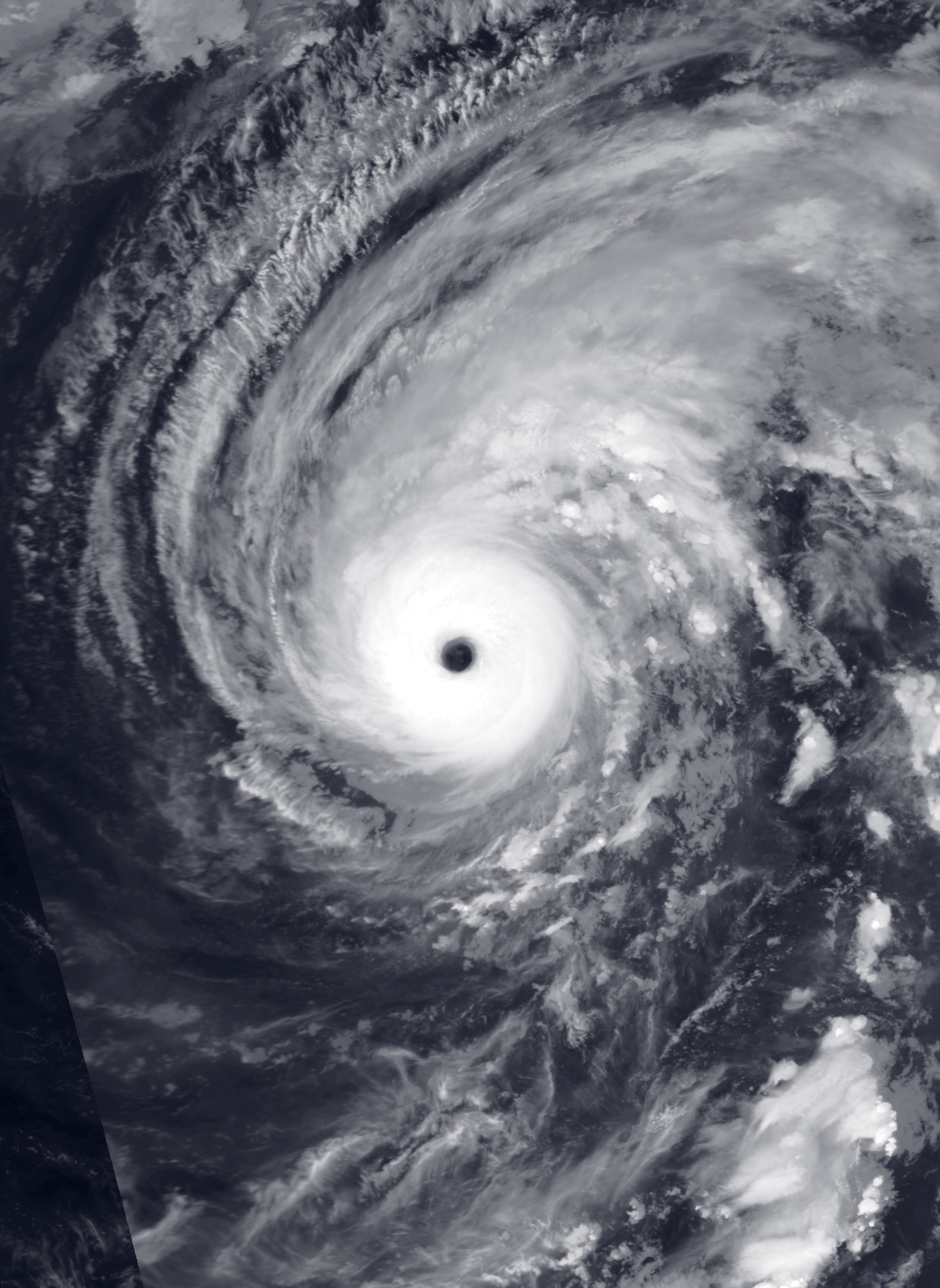
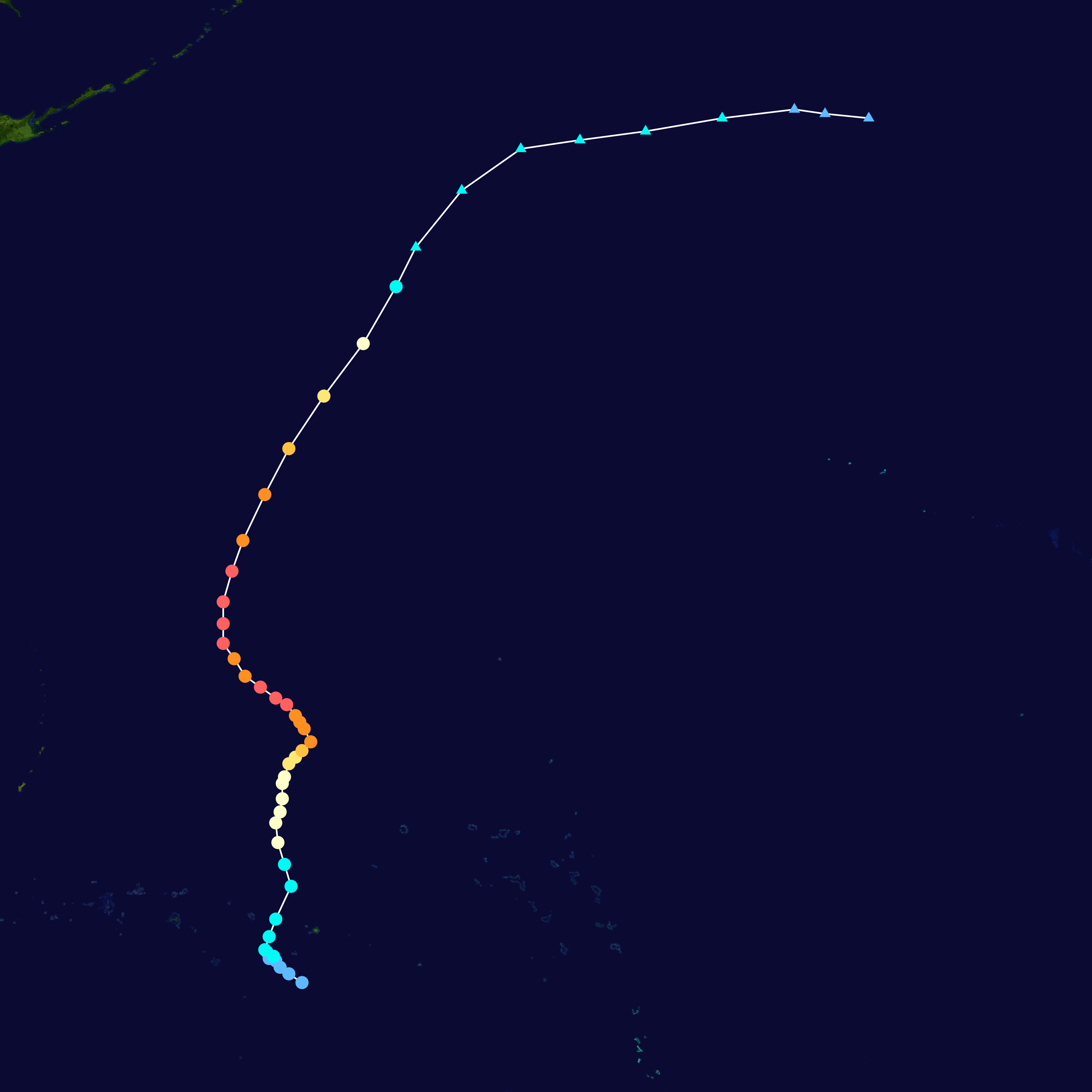
- Duration: October 18 – October 27
- Peak intensity: 185 km/h (115 mph) (10-min); 925 hPa (mbar)

Typhoon Podul originated from an area of convection located near Pohnpei on October 16. The system experienced vertical wind shear before strengthening to a tropical depression on October 18, before upgrading further to a tropical storm on October 20. Due to the increase of deep convection and the organization of the system's center, Podul was upgraded to a typhoon by the JTWC on the 21st while being centered about 480 km (300 mi) north-northwest of Pohnpei or 1,296 km (805 mi) east of Guam. The JMA however, upgraded the storm the following day to Typhoon Podul, as the storm shifted north-northeastward after making a half-counterclockwise turn.

Podul underwent steady intensification while its well-defined eye had developed on October 23. As it continued its northwestward trek, satellite imagery showed that Podul underwent a concentric eyewall cycle on the 24th. Podul reached its peak intensity on the 25th, with 10-minute winds of 185 km/h (115 mph) and 1-minute winds of 260 km/h (160 mph), prompting the JTWC to classify the storm as a super typhoon. Its barometric pressure was 925 hPa (27.3 inHg) by that time. Although it still had super typhoon strength, Podul showed its first signs of extratropical transition and by 18:00 UTC, was located 1,296 km (805 mi) northwest of Wake Island. Podul would retain the super typhoon strength for 72 hours, before its winds weakened to 220 km/h (135 mph). Podul recurved and accelerated north-northeast as it began to rapidly weaken from dry air and cold air advection and transitioned to an extratropical cyclone on the 28th before dissipating the next day.

=== Typhoon Lingling (Nanang) ===
- Very strong typhoon (JMA)
- Category 4 typhoon (SSHWS)
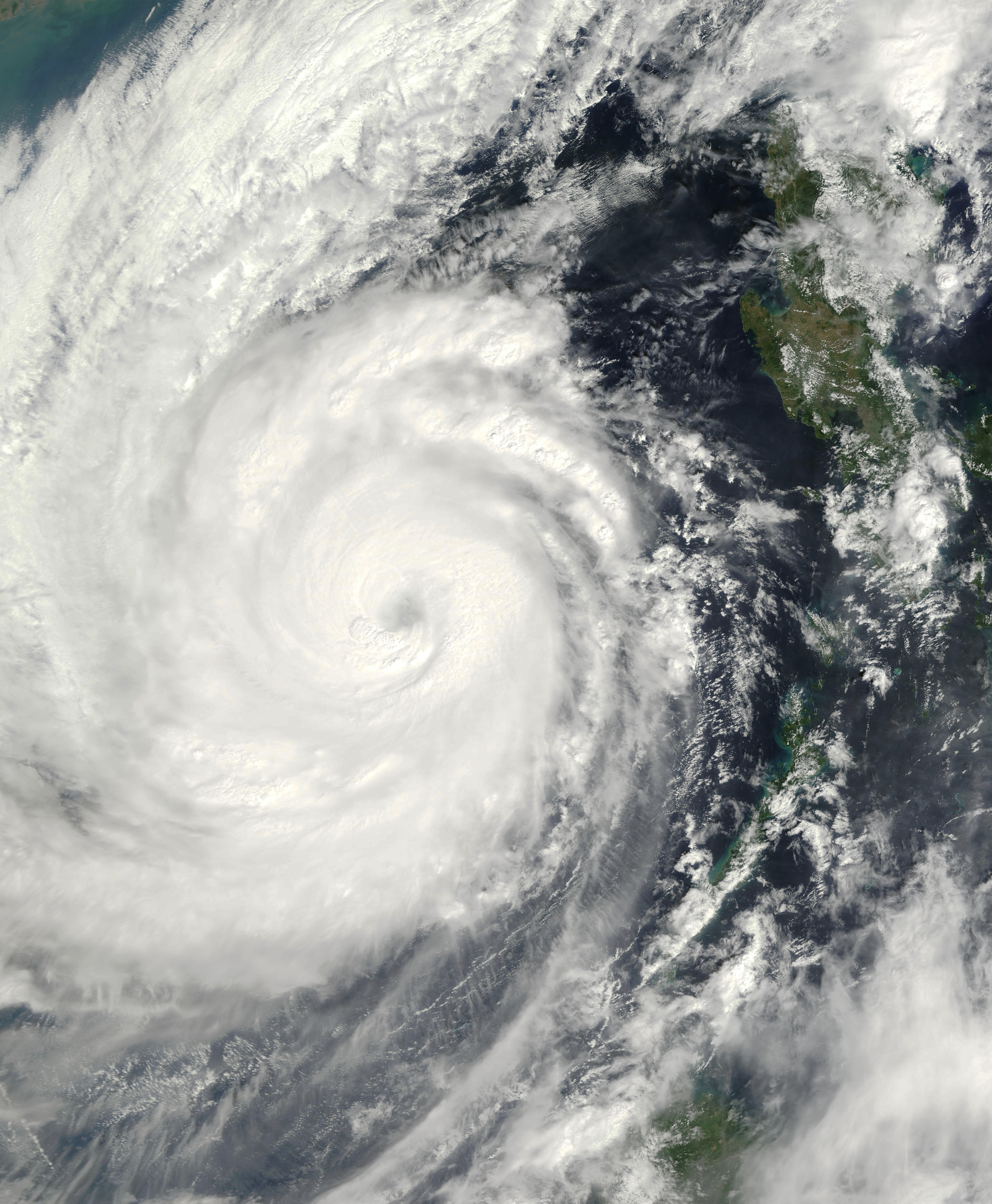
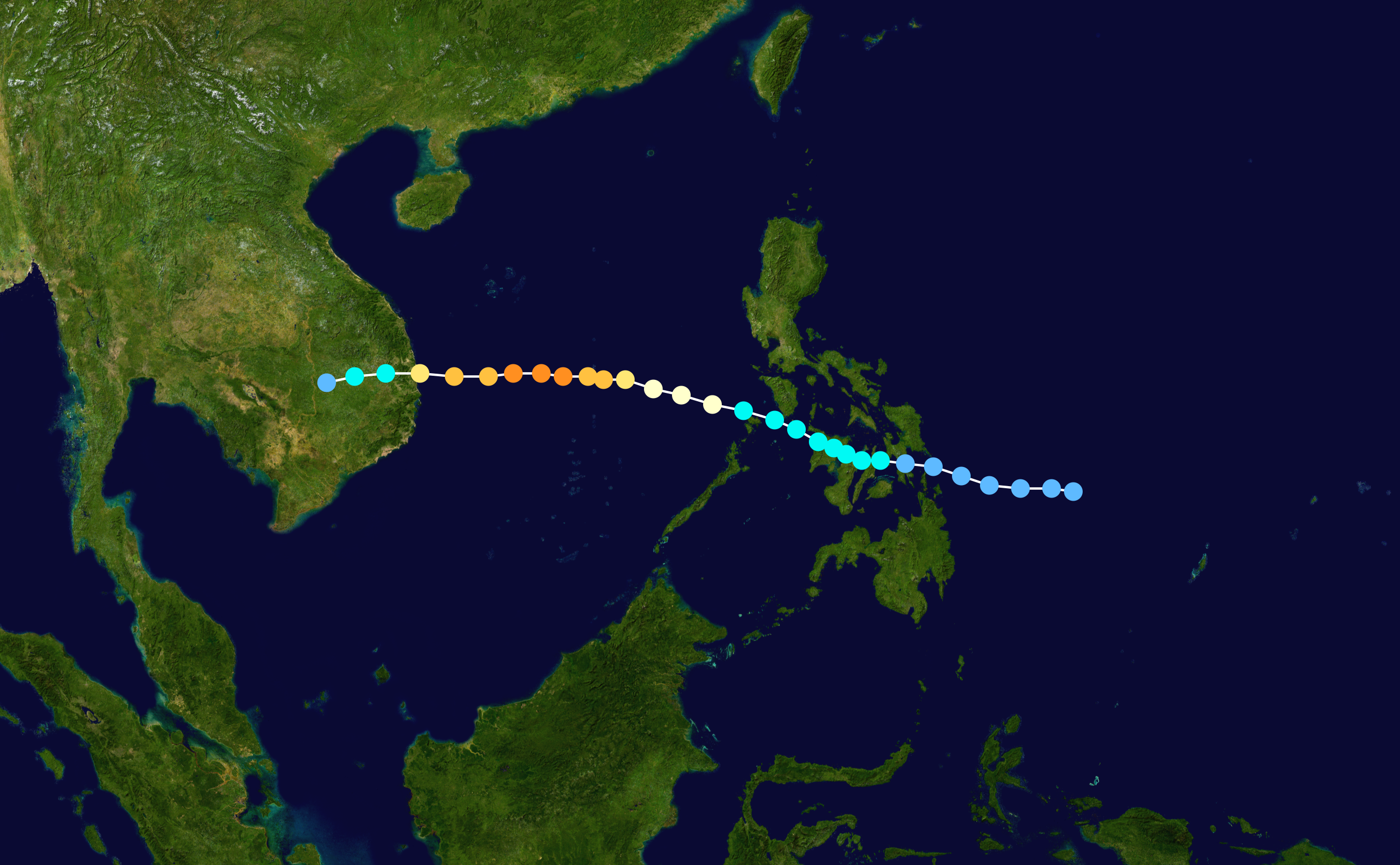
- Duration: November 6 – November 12
- Peak intensity: 155 km/h (100 mph) (10-min); 940 hPa (mbar)

A tropical depression formed in the Philippine Sea on November 5. It moved westward, hitting the Philippines on the 6th. The depression strengthened over the archipelago, becoming a tropical storm on the 7th. Lingling continued to intensify, reaching a peak of 130 mph (210 km/h) winds on the 10th in the South China Sea. The next day, the typhoon hit central Vietnam as a 110 mph (180 km/h) typhoon, and dissipated on the 12th.

Lingling, like most typhoons, brought torrential rains and flooding, resulting in 171 deaths in the Philippines (with 118 missing) and 18 deaths in Vietnam.

=== Tropical Storm Kajiki (Quedan) ===
- Tropical storm (JMA)
- Tropical storm (SSHWS)
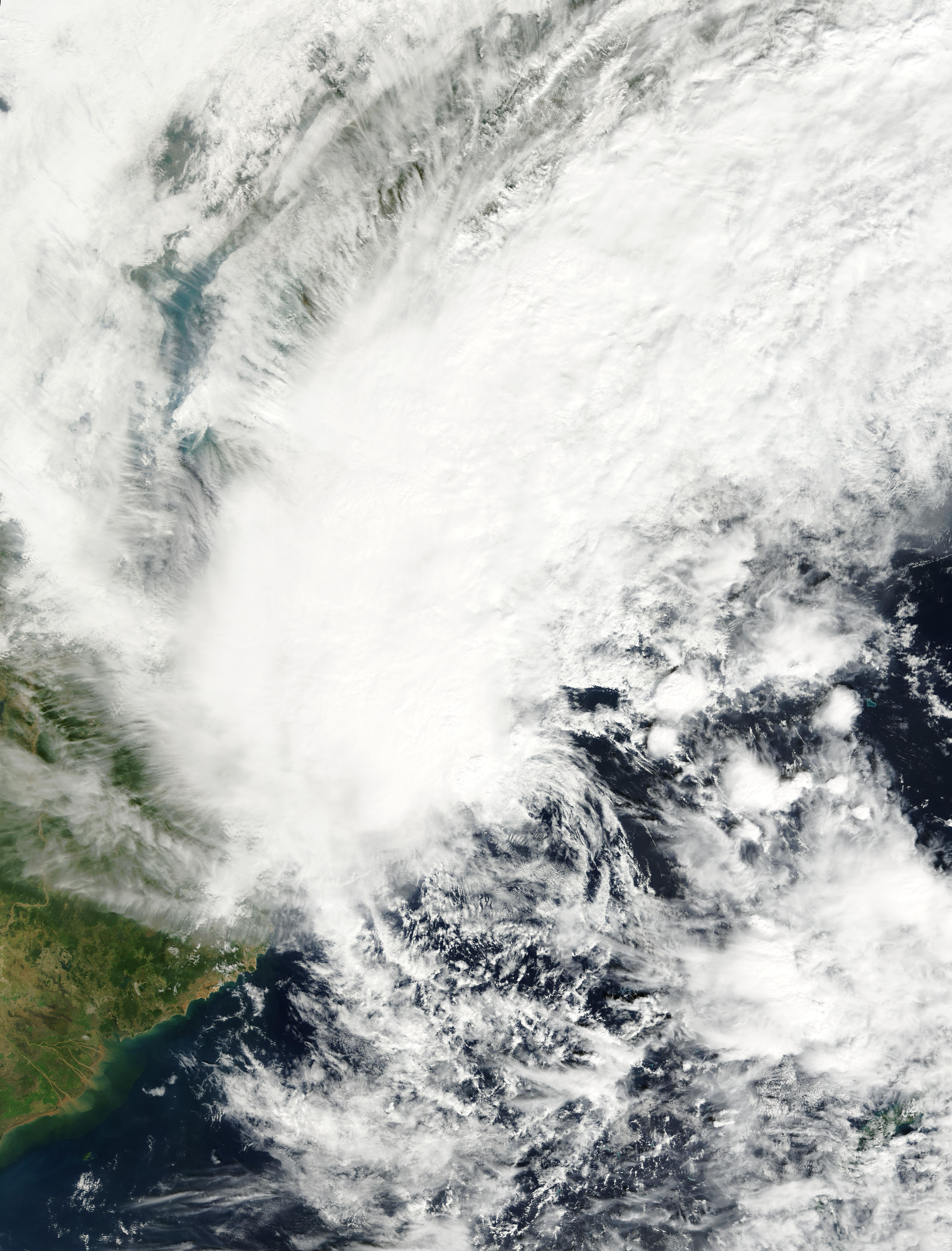
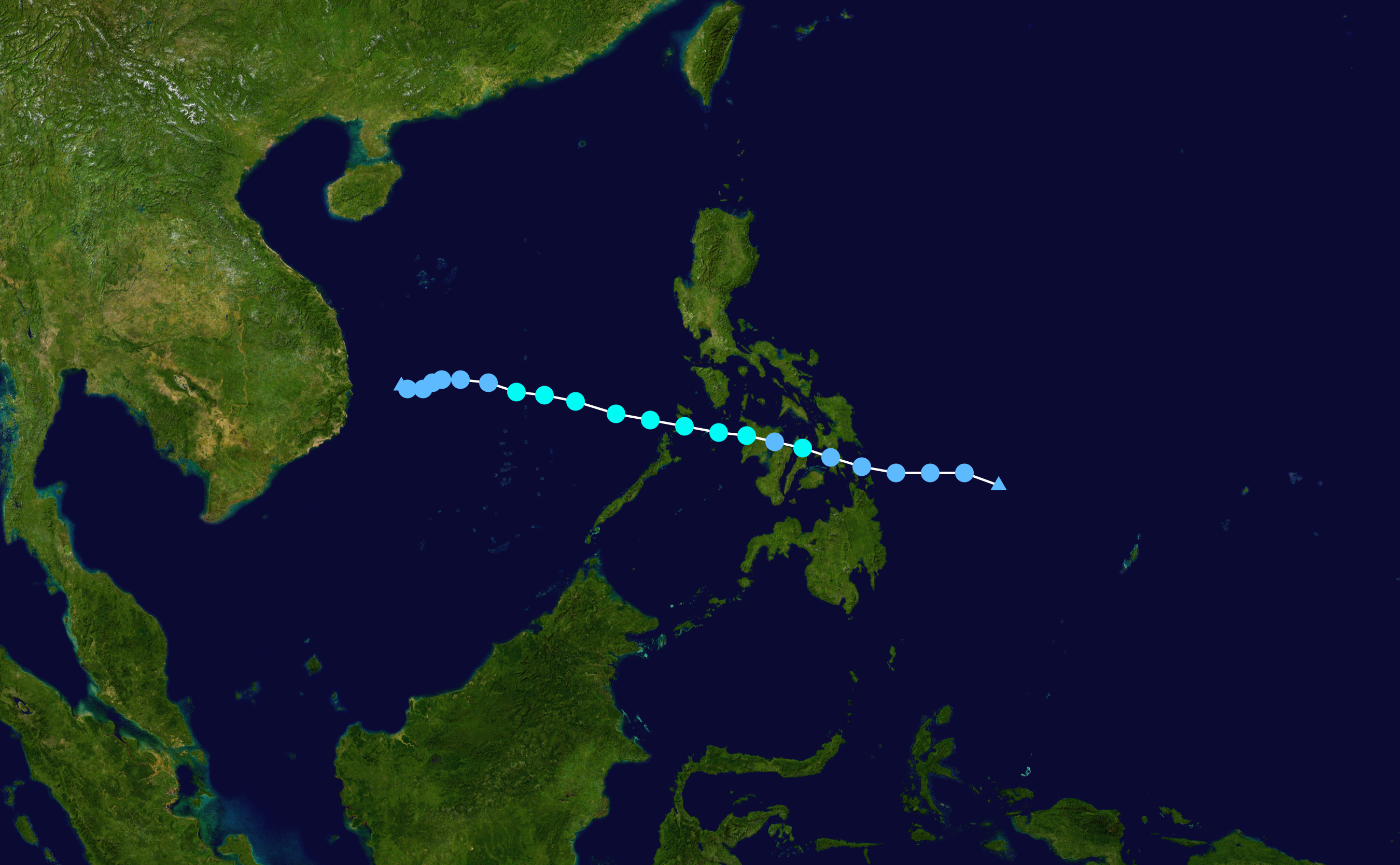
- Duration: December 4 – December 9
- Peak intensity: 65 km/h (40 mph) (10-min); 996 hPa (mbar)

In the first few days of December, an area of convection developed to the south of Guam. By December 4, both the JMA and the PAGASA upgraded the system into a tropical depression, with the PAGASA naming it Quedan. After deep convection was seen developing from multi-spectral imagery, the JTWC followed suit and began issuing advisories on 00:00 UTC of December 5 — giving the identifier of 30W. On the same day, the system intensified into a tropical storm, with the JMA naming it as Kajiki. Kajiki moved in a west-northwestward direction, traversing the islands of Visayas. By December 7, Kajiki emerged to the South China Sea, where unfavorable wind shear weakened the system. At this point, the storm's center started to become exposed and the storm's structure started to deteriorate. Both the JTWC and the JMA downgraded Kajiki to a tropical depression on the next day. The JMA tracked Kajiki until it neared the eastern coast of Vietnam on December 9.

In the Philippines, Kajiki (Quedan) brought only light to moderate rainfall over Visayas. Only two people were dead, while a total of 6,400 people were displaced, according to Agence France-Presse. Even though Kajiki remained far away from China, heavy rainfall from the storm's outflow was seen in the Hainan and Guandong provinces. In Xuwen County, 70 millimetres (2.8 in) of rainfall was recorded in a 24-hour period from December 9 to 10. Qiongzhong County received the highest amount of precipitation, with a recorded 249 millimetres (9.8 in). In Hainan, the heavy rainfall mostly led to agricultural losses, damaging up to ¥90.57 million (US$10.94 million).

=== Tropical Storm 31W ===
- Tropical storm (SSHWS)
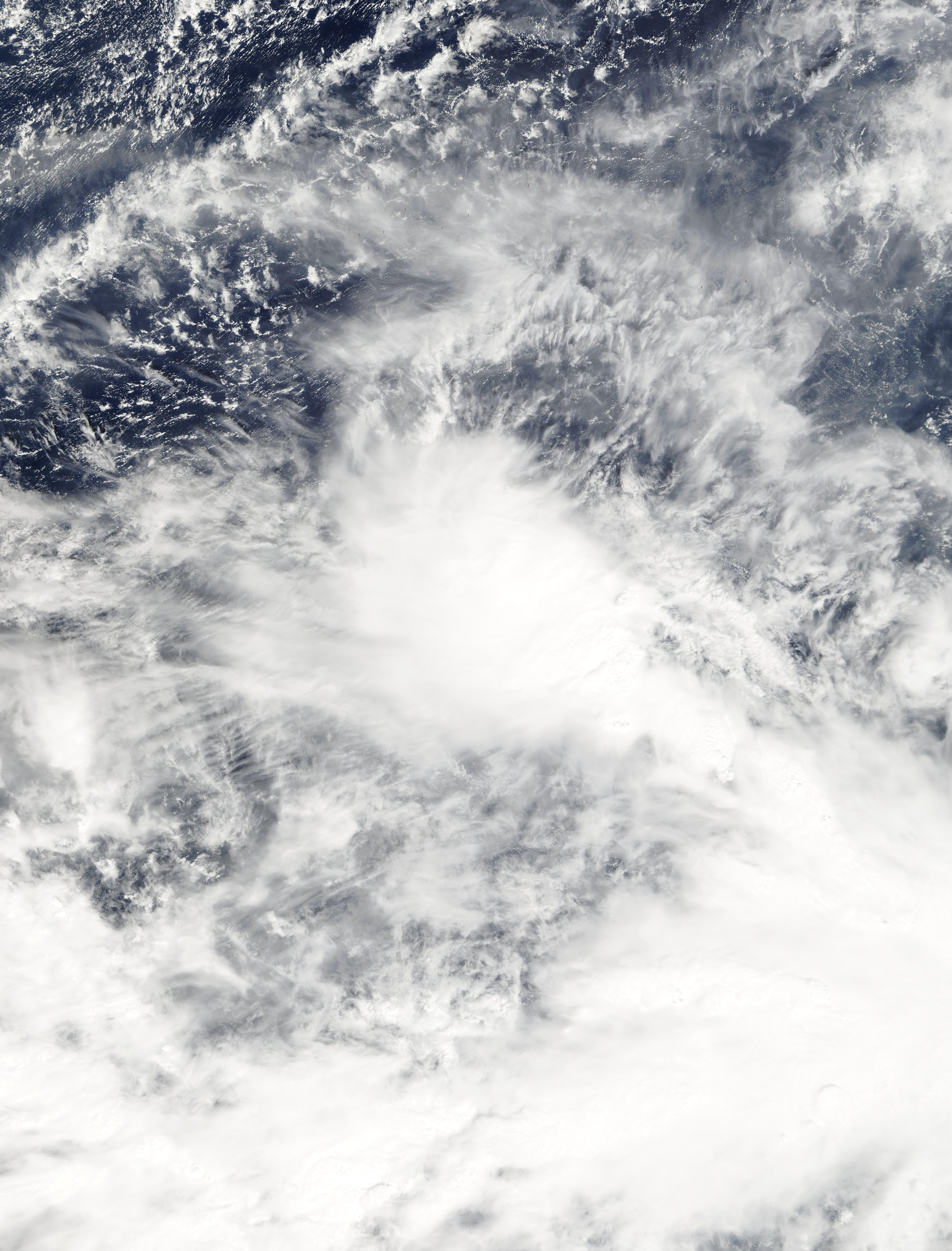
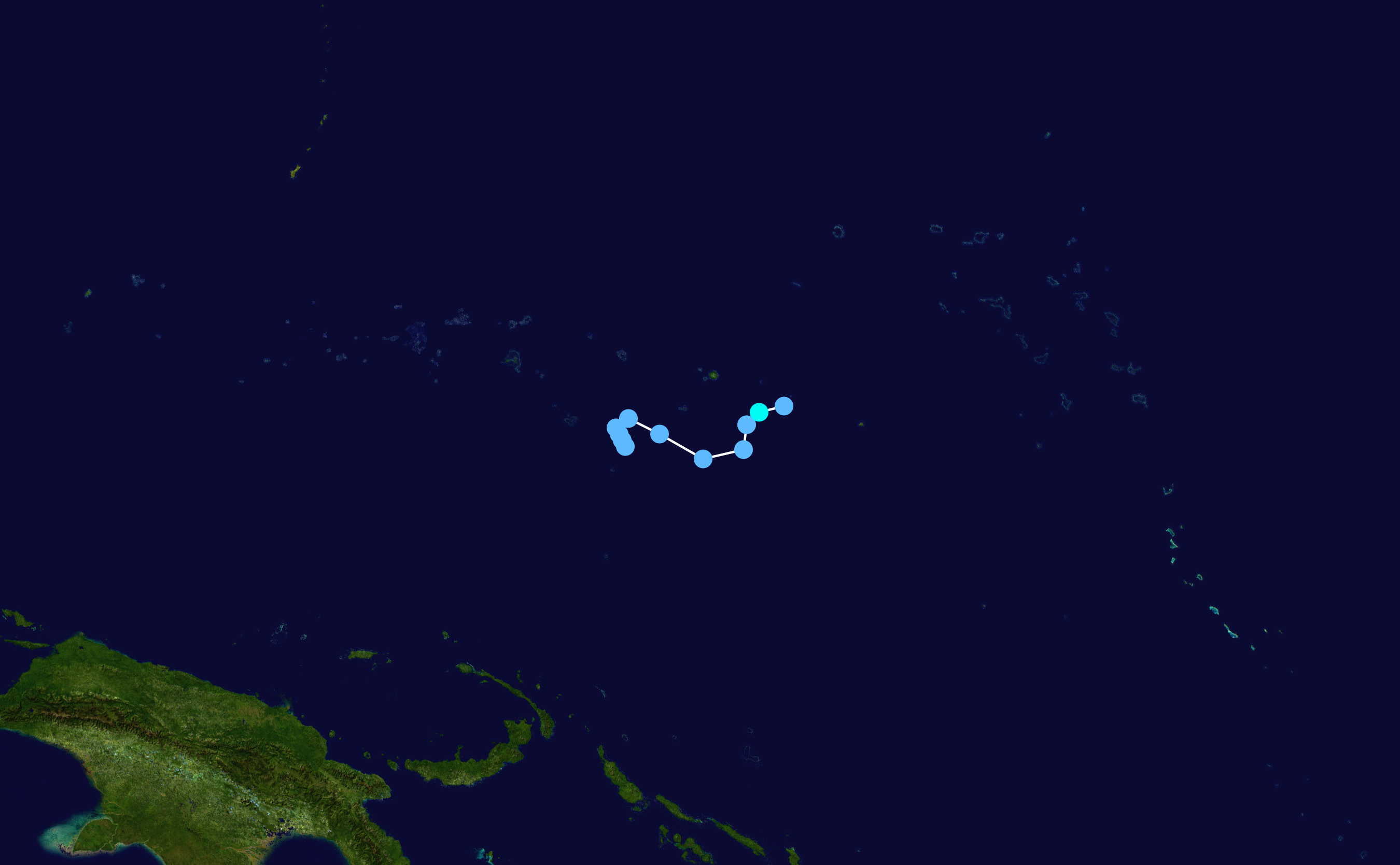
- Duration: December 10 – December 13
- Peak intensity: 65 km/h (40 mph) (1-min); 997 hPa (mbar)

Operationally the same system as Typhoon Faxai, an area of unorganised convection in a region of weak to moderate vertical wind shear had persisted to the southwest of Pohnpei on December 10. By 12:00 UTC of the same day, the JTWC upgraded the system to Tropical Depression 31W. Satellite imagery and animations showed that there were multiple centers within the large-scale center, which made it difficult to track. By December 12, the system finally gained convection near its center. 31W briefly reached tropical storm intensity by the JTWC on 18:00 UTC of the same day. The storm was still difficult to track, which made one warning relocating the storm's center near the island of Kosrae. However, after post-analysis, this center was a newly developed center that originated from the same surface trough of 31W. This new center eventually became Tropical Storm Faxai.

=== Typhoon Faxai ===
- Violent typhoon (JMA)
- Category 5 super typhoon (SSHWS)
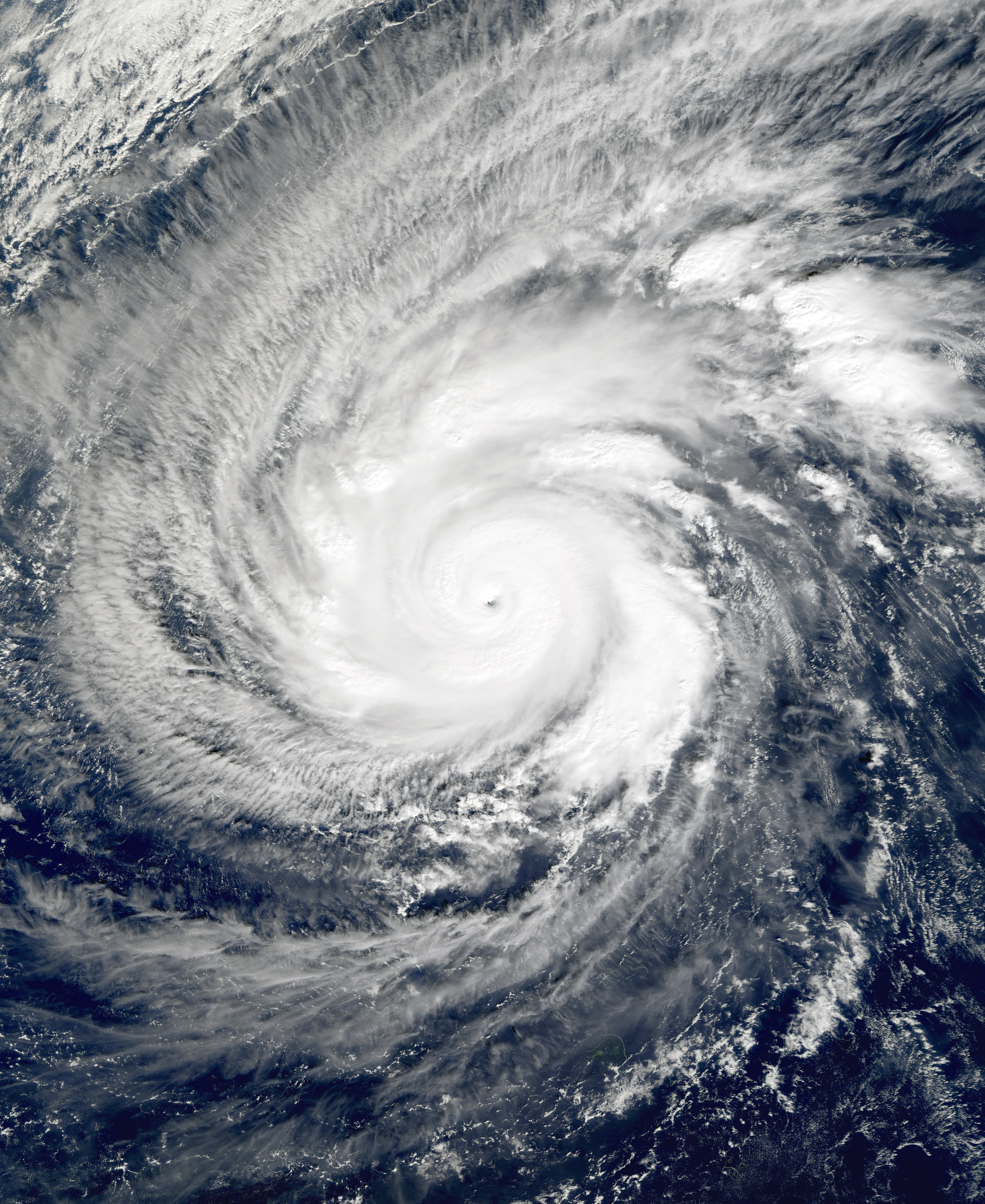
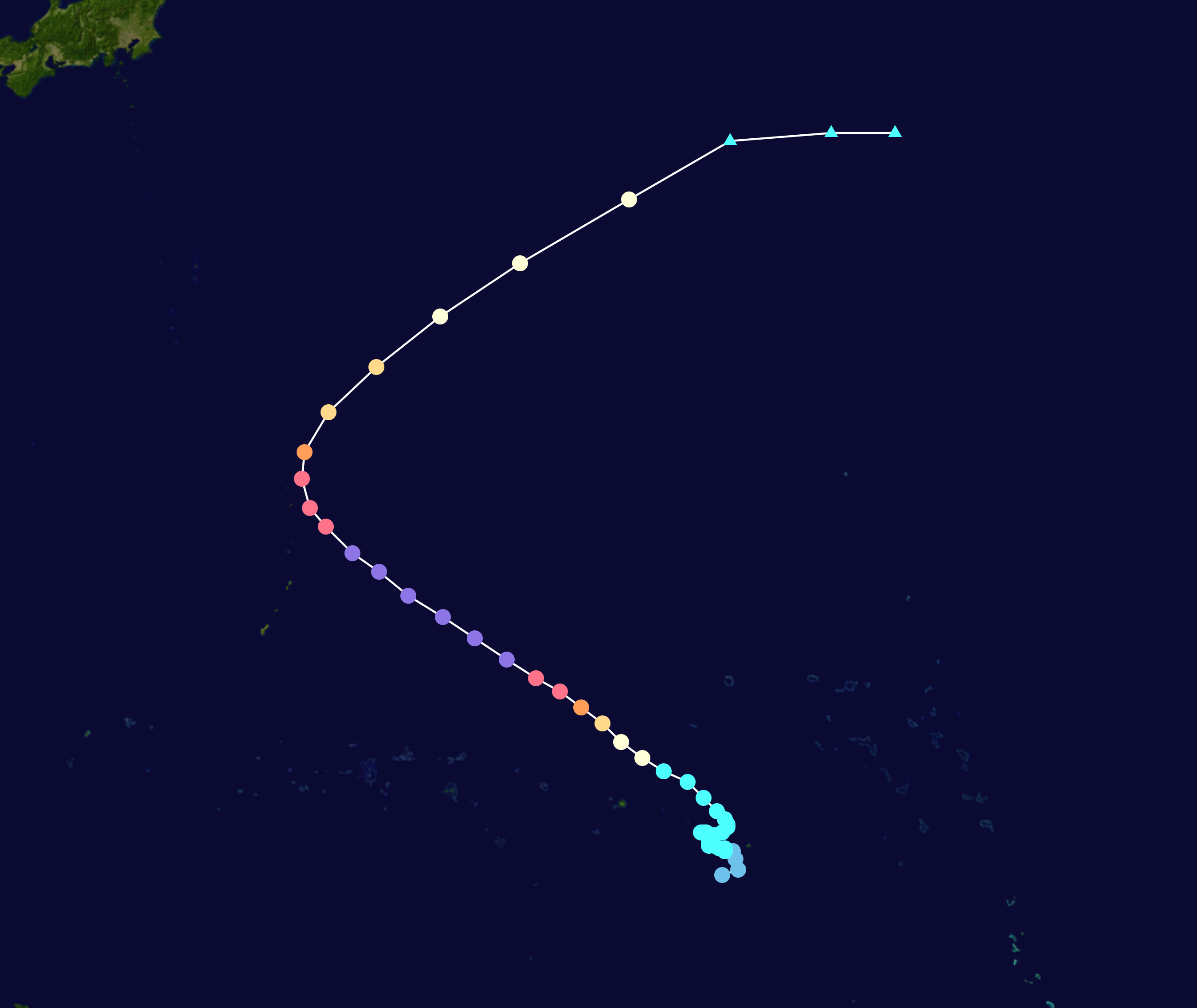
- Duration: December 13 – December 25
- Peak intensity: 195 km/h (120 mph) (10-min); 915 hPa (mbar)

Typhoon Faxai originated from a low-latitude monsoon trough in the Caroline Islands that developed from the remnants of 31W through post-analysis on December 13. The system would later become a tropical depression, giving it the initial designated name 31W by the JTWC. The tropical depression upgraded to a tropical storm by the JTWC on December 15, before the JMA follows suit on December 16, giving the storm the name Faxai. Tropical Storm Faxai remained stationed around Kosrae for several days before slowly moving in eastward motion. The storm then drifted west-northwestward and became more organized. By December 21, the storm intensified into a typhoon and formed an eye.

The storm steadily went on a west-northwestward direction while positioned approximately 1,204 km (748 mi) southeast of the Mariana Islands. Faxai began to rapidly intensify, and by December 22, Faxai became the year's third super typhoon. Faxai reached its peak intensity the following day, with 10-minute sustained winds of 195 km/h (120 mph) and 1-minute sustained winds of 285 km/h (175 mph), with the minimum central pressure of 915 hPa (27.0 inHg). The eye became cloud-filled as the typhoon started to weaken. Faxai recurved over the island of Agrihan on December 24, and began to transition into an extratropical cyclone. The storm degraded as it rapidly weakened. On Christmas Day, a significant decrease of deep convective clouds and bands occurred. The JTWC issued its final bulletin as it declared that Faxai became extratropical and later dissipated. Its remnants were noted on December 26 by the JMA.

Initially Faxai was classified as part of Tropical Depression 31W, but post-analysis considers the early part of Faxai's life a separate storm. As such, Faxai was classified as 33W in post-analysis. Faxai poured 10.74 and 24.76 in (27.3 and 62.9 cm) of rainfall upon Kosrae. An indirect death occurred in the island and electrical power was knocked by the heavy rainfall. A 69-year-old man drowned in Gun Beach from strong currents across the shoreline on December 22.

=== Tropical Storm Vamei ===
- Tropical storm (JMA)
- Category 1 typhoon (SSHWS)
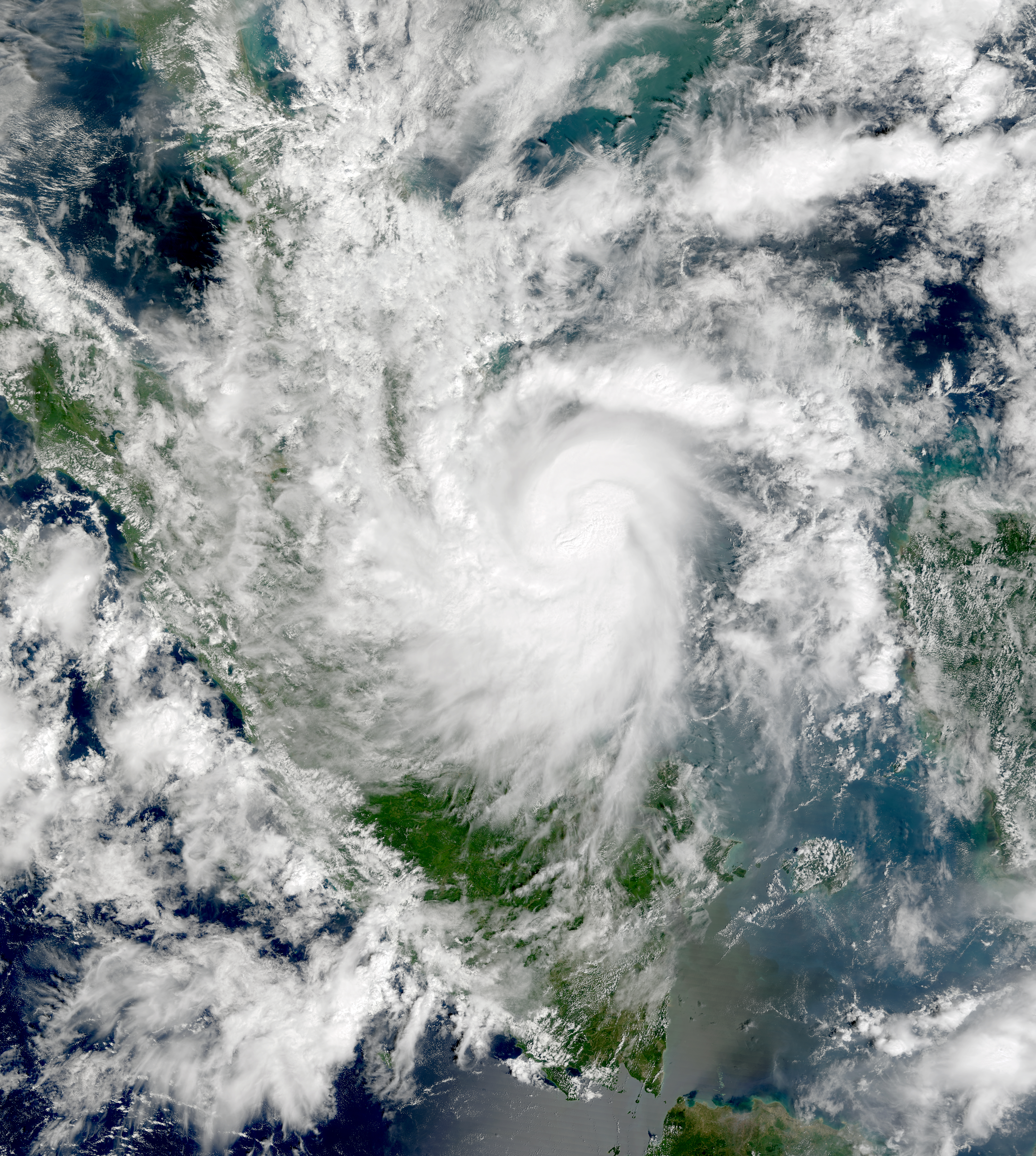
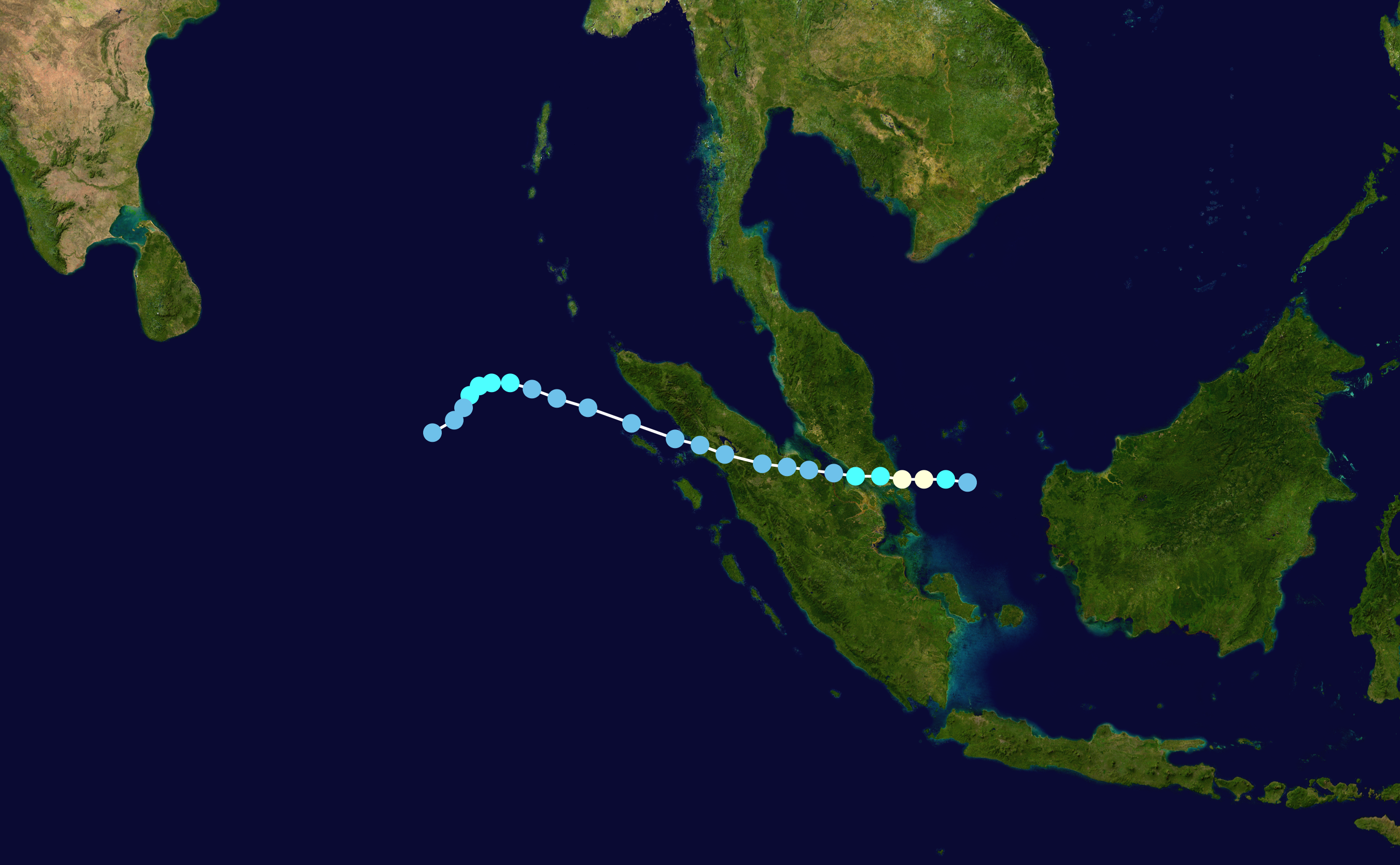
- Duration: December 26 – December 28 (Exited basin on Dec. 29)
- Peak intensity: 85 km/h (50 mph) (10-min); 1006 hPa (mbar)

Tropical Depression 32W formed 370 kilometres (230 miles) east of Singapore at 1200 UTC (2000 SGT) on December 26. It is extremely unusual to see tropical development this close to the equator. The initial position of 1.4° N means this storm formed only 167 kilometres (104 mi) north of the equator. On December 27 it was upgraded to Tropical Storm Vamei, and shortly thereafter it made landfall in Malaysia. Emerging into the Indian Ocean on December 29 as a Tropical Depression, it briefly re-strengthened before dissipating on January 1.

Offshore of Malaysia, two U.S. Navy ships in Vamei's eyewall were damaged by strong winds. Vamei brought strong winds and heavy rainfall to Malaysia, where rainfall reached over 200 mm (7.9 in) in Senai. Additionally, monsoonal moisture, influenced by the storm, produced moderate to heavy precipitation across various regions of peninsular Malaysia. Along Gunung Pulai, the rainfall caused a landslide which destroyed four houses and killed five people. Damage from the flooding was estimated at RM13.7 million (2001 MYR, $3.6 million 2001 USD). The Malaysian government provided affected families up to RM5,000 (2001 MYR, $1,300 2001 USD) in assistance for food, clothing, and repairs. Vamei also brought heavy rainfall to Singapore, which caused air traffic disruptions at the Singapore Changi Airport.

=== Other systems ===
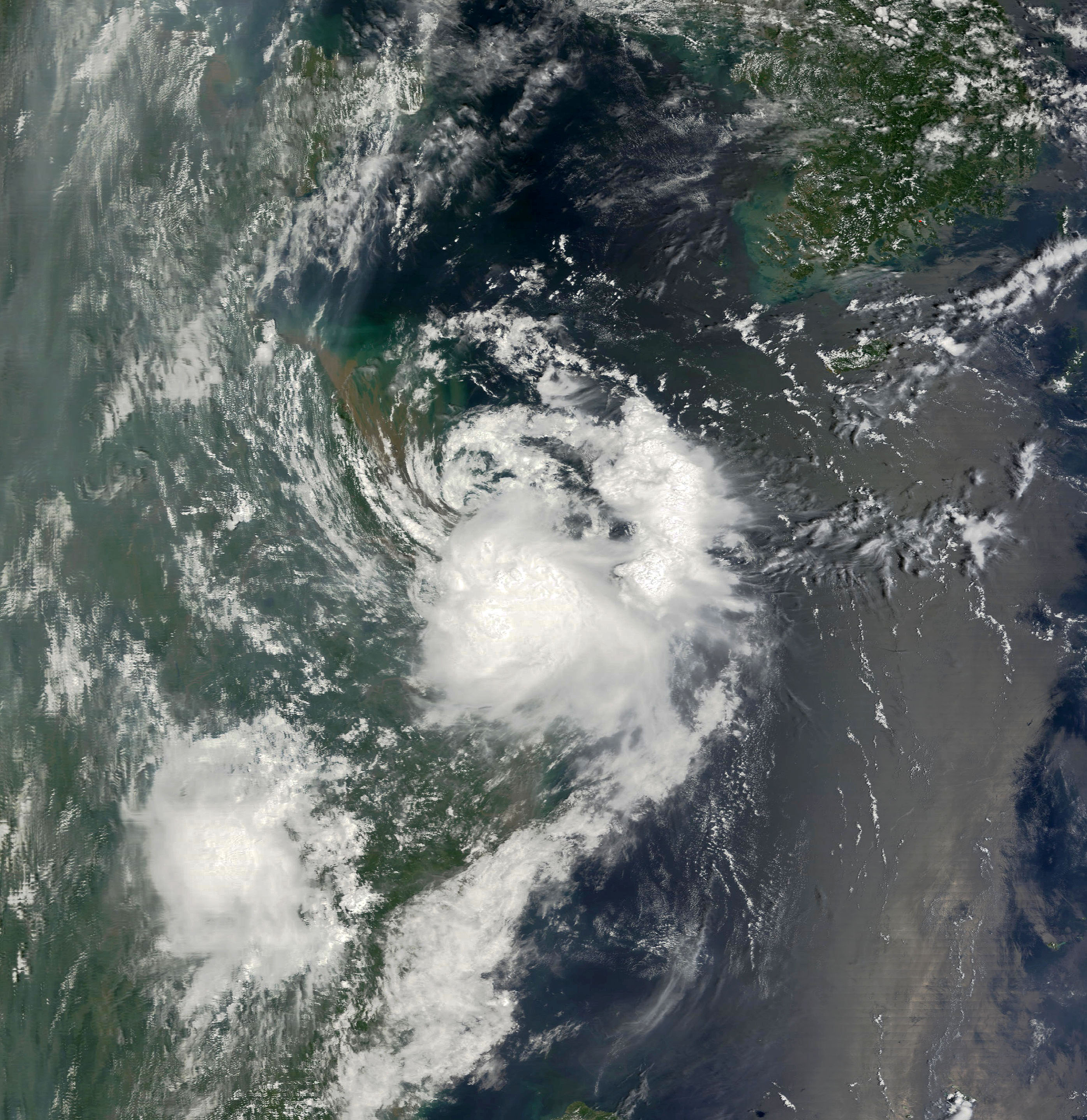
A tropical depression over Shanghai on August 6

- On 18:00 UTC of February 17, both the JMA and PAGASA began to track a tropical depression that was located about 324 km (201 mi) to the northeast of Surigao of Northern Mindanao. The PAGASA named the system, Auring. The JTWC followed suit and designated it 01W, six hours later. Auring moved westward and began traversing the Philippine archipelago of Visayas. By February 19, the PAGASA issued its final warning on Auring. The JTWC also issued its final advisory on the system on February 20. The JMA downgraded the system to a low-pressure area, and its remnants tracked northward, where it was last noted off the coast of the Ilocos Region on February 23. Auring brought rainfall throughout most of Visayas and Mindanao. At least 18 people died, with most of these deaths due to landslides that occurred from the torrential rain. In Leyte and most of Mindanao, flooding submerged the homes of 159,785 people. Damages from crops and property have been estimated at ₱200 million (US$4.16 million).
- The PAGASA began issuing advisories on Tropical Depression Barok on 06:00 UTC of April 16, located to the west of Palau. Six hours later, the JTWC followed suit on initiating advisories, where they designated it as 02W. Barok moved in a northwestward direction well to the east of the Philippines without any intensification. By April 19, both agencies stopped warning on the system when the depression quickly deteriorated. Even though warnings were discontinued, its remnants continued to show signs of life with several bursts of convection. This prompted the JTWC to issue a Tropical Cyclone Formation Alert (TCFA) on April 21, however its convection significantly weakened.
- On May 6, the JMA tracked a weak tropical depression off the northeastern coast of Mindanao. The system degenerated into a low-pressure area the next day. A tropical depression was briefly tracked by the Central Weather Bureau of Taiwan in the middle of May. The JTWC issued a TCFA on May 16, but the system moved inland over Vietnam in the Nam Dinh province.
- On June 16, PAGASA designated Tropical Depression Darna just off the eastern coast of Luzon. Three days later, the JMA also classified it as a tropical depression, but it quickly dissipated.
- The JTWC began tracking Tropical Depression 08W about 972 km (604 mi) southwest of Midway Atoll on July 10. 08W was known as a "hybrid system", where it developed in an area of strong wind shear and the system was already becoming extratropical. The JTWC issued its second and final warning early the next day. The storm's remnants moved outside the basin early on July 12.
- On July 16, the JMA began to monitor a tropical depression about 833 km (518 mi) east-northeast of Iwo Jima. The depression moved in a slow, erratic direction, and began moving east-northeastward. By July 18, the system was approaching a shortwave trough, causing it to weaken and dissipate the next day.
- On August 2, the JMA started to track a tropical depression that had developed about 972 km (604 mi) southeast of Okinawa. The depression moved in a west-northwestward track until it was lasted noted to the east of Taiwan. Presumably related from the previous system, the JMA began to track another tropical depression that had developed near Shanghai on August 5. The system emerged to the Yellow Sea and impacted the Korean Peninsula on August 7, before dissipating on the next day. This tropical depression brought heavy rainfall across eastern China, with Huangpu District, Shanghai getting 289 mm (11.4 in) of rainfall. Due to this, 30,000 houses were destroyed, and moreover, the system produced a tornado near the area.
- On August 16, the PAGASA started to track Tropical Depression Jolina to the west of Dagupan. The depression slowly meandered in the place until its system's center became exposed, and dissipated on August 21.
- On 12:00 UTC of August 24, the JMA started to track a weak tropical depression that had developed about 648 km (403 mi) to the northwest of Wake Island. Six hours later, the JTWC followed suit and began issuing advisories, giving the designation of 15W. The system slowly intensified within the next day. Despite bring predicted that the system would intensify into a tropical storm, the JTWC indicated that the system was beginning to merge with a frontal boundary. Afterwards, 15W re-curved and began moving northwestward until it neared Hokkaido on 00:00 UTC of August 28, when the system was absorbed by a stationary front.
- On October 20, a tropical depression had developed a couple hundred miles east of the coast of Vietnam. The JTWC issued a TCFA when the system was embedded in a broad area of convection. However, this was cancelled the next day when the system moved over Vietnam and dissipated. The tropical depression brought torrential rains all over Vietnam, which worsened the flooding that has been existing since August. 39 people have died with the added effects from the system, and damage totals from the overall flooding had reached ₫1.5 trillion (US$66.6 million).
- A tropical disturbance associated with the monsoon trough began to form about 315 km (196 mi) west-southwest of Pohnpei on November 14. Convection slowly deepened and the disturbance's structure began to consolidate. By 06:00 UTC of November 17, the JMA upgraded the system to a tropical depression. Animated satellite imagery revealed that its center became elongated with continued development of convection. This prompted the JTWC to begin issuing advisories as a tropical depression six hours later, giving the designation 28W. Maintaining its intensity, 28W tracked westward and entered the Philippine Area of Responsibility on November 20, with PAGASA to start issuing bulletins and naming it Ondoy. Later that day, the JTWC upgraded Ondoy to a tropical storm, peaking with 1-minute sustained winds of 65 km/h (40 mph). Shortly thereafter, Ondoy's center became partially exposed, with the JTWC downgrading the system back to a tropical depression. Within the next two days, Ondoy completed a loop to the east of Samar Island, and shifted its movement north-northwestward. The JTWC issued its final advisory on 18:00 UTC of November 24, however both the JMA and PAGASA still tracked the system until November 25.
- On November 18, the JMA began to track a tropical depression that had developed about 426 km (265 mi) northeast of Singapore. By the next day, the system began to drift eastward, with satellite imagery depicting a convective banding feature with some deep convection. The JTWC upgraded the system to a tropical depression and issued its first advisory on 06:00 UTC of November 20, receiving the designation 29W. 29W intensified into a tropical storm by the JTWC on 00:00 UTC of November 21, when the system's vortex became well-defined. By the next day, the storm entered the western portion of the Philippine area of responsibility, with PAGASA giving the name Pabling. On November 23, the JTWC downgraded Pabling back to a tropical depression after the system encountered increasing wind shear. The JTWC issued its final advisory shortly thereafter, when the storm was located just off the southern tip of Palawan. Pabling slowly dissipated the next day when it emerged in the waters of the Sulu Sea.

== Storm names ==
Within the North-western Pacific Ocean, both the Japan Meteorological Agency (JMA) and the Philippine Atmospheric, Geophysical and Astronomical Services Administration assign names to tropical cyclones that develop in the Western Pacific, which can result in a tropical cyclone having two names. The Japan Meteorological Agency's RSMC Tokyo — Typhoon Center assigns international names to tropical cyclones on behalf of the World Meteorological Organization's Typhoon Committee, should they be judged to have 10-minute sustained windspeeds of 65 km/h (40 mph). While the Philippine Atmospheric, Geophysical and Astronomical Services Administration assigns names to tropical cyclones which move into or form as a tropical depression in their area of responsibility located between 135°E and 115°E and between 5°N-25°N even if the cyclone has had an international name assigned to it. The names of significant tropical cyclones are retired, by both PAGASA and the Typhoon Committee. Should the list of names for the Philippine region be exhausted then names will be taken from an auxiliary list of which the first ten are published each season. Unused names are marked in gray.

=== International names ===
During the season 26 named tropical cyclones developed in the Western Pacific and were named by the Japan Meteorological Agency, when it was determined that they had become tropical storms. These names were contributed to a list of a 140 names submitted by the fourteen members nations and territories of the ESCAP/WMO Typhoon Committee.

Cimaron	Chebi	Durian	Utor	Trami	Kong-rey	Yutu	Toraji	Man-yi	Usagi	Pabuk	Wutip	Sepat
Fitow	Danas	Nari	Vipa	Francisco	Lekima	Krosa	Haiyan	Podul	Lingling	Kajiki	Faxai	Vamei

Each of the names in this list was used for the first time. However, it was the only time for the names Vipa and Vamei to be utilized, as the former's spelling was corrected to Wipha in 2002, while the name Vamei was retired, and was replaced with Peipah.

=== Philippines ===
Auring	Barok	Crising	Darna	Emong
Feria	Gorio	Huaning	Isang	Jolina
Kiko	Labuyo	Maring	Nanang	Ondoy
Pabling	Quedan	Roleta (unused)	Sibak (unused)	Talahib (unused)
Ubbeng (unused)	Vinta (unused)	Wilma (unused)	Yaning (unused)	Zuma (unused)
Auxiliary list
Alamid (unused)	Bruno (unused)	Conching (unused)	Dolor (unused)	Ekis (unused)
Fuerza (unused)	Gimbal (unused)	Hampas (unused)	Isko (unused)	Juego (unused)

The Philippine Atmospheric, Geophysical and Astronomical Services Administration uses its own naming scheme for tropical cyclones in their area of responsibility. PAGASA assigns names to tropical depressions that form within their area of responsibility and any tropical cyclone that might move into their area of responsibility. Should the list of names for a given year prove to be insufficient, names are taken from an auxiliary list, the first 10 of which are published each year before the season starts.

Starting in 2001, new sets of names are implemented. Most of these names in the list were used for the first time (and only, in the cases of Barok, Darna, Nanang, and Pabling), except for the names Auring, Huaning, Isang, and Maring, which were taken from the old list. The name Yaning was also taken from the old list. Names that were not assigned are marked in gray.

=== Retirement ===
The name Vamei was retired by the ESCAP/WMO Typhoon Committee. The name Peipah was chosen to replace Vamei. The name Nanang was retired by PAGASA and was replaced by Nando for 2005. Along with Nanang, PAGASA unofficially retired the names Barok, Darna, Pabling, Roleta, Sibak, Talahib, Ubbeng, Yaning, Zuma, Ekis, Fuerza, Gimbal, Hampas and Juego, and replaced them with Bising, Dante, Pepeng, Ramil, Santi, Tino, Urduja, Yolanda, Zoraida, Ernie, Florante, Gerardo, Hernan and Jerome for future seasons.

== Season effects ==
This table lists all the storms that developed in the western Pacific Ocean to the west of the International Date Line during the 2001 season. It includes their intensity, duration, name, landfalls, deaths, and damages. All damage figures are in 2001 USD. Damages and deaths from a storm include when the storm was a precursor wave or extratropical low.

Name	Dates	Peak intensity			Areas affected	Damage (USD)	Deaths	Ref(s).
Name	Dates	Category	Wind speed	Pressure	Areas affected	Damage (USD)	Deaths	Ref(s).
01W (Auring)	February 17 – 20	Tropical depression	55 km/h (34 mph)	1,004 hPa (29.65 inHg)	Philippines	$4.16 million	18	
02W (Barok)	April 16 – 18	Tropical depression	45 km/h (28 mph)	1,004 hPa (29.65 inHg)	None	None	None	
TD	May 6 – 7	Tropical depression	Not specified	1,004 hPa (29.65 inHg)	Philippines	None	None	
TD	May 16	Tropical depression	Not specified	Not specified	Vietnam	None	None	
Cimaron (Crising)	May 9 – 14	Severe tropical storm	95 km/h (59 mph)	985 hPa (29.09 inHg)	Philippines, Taiwan	$555,000	None	
Darna	June 17 – 19	Tropical depression	55 km/h (34 mph)	1000 hPa (29.53 inHg)	Philippines	Unknown	None	
Chebi (Emong)	June 19 – 24	Strong typhoon	120 km/h (75 mph)	965 hPa (28.50 inHg)	Philippines, China, Taiwan, South Korea, Japan	$471 million	464	
Durian	June 29 – July 2	Severe tropical storm	95 km/h (59 mph)	970 hPa (28.64 inHg)	China, Vietnam	$422 million	97	
Utor (Feria)	July 1 – 7	Severe tropical storm	110 km/h (68 mph)	960 hPa (28.35 inHg)	Philippines, China, Taiwan	$332 million	197	
Trami (Gorio)	July 8 – 11	Tropical storm	75 km/h (47 mph)	994 hPa (29.35 inHg)	Philippines, Taiwan, East China	Unknown	5	
08W	July 10 – 11	Tropical depression	45 km/h (28 mph)	1,002 hPa (29.59 inHg)	None	None	None	
TD	July 16 – 19	Tropical depression	Not specified	1,004 hPa (29.65 inHg)	None	Unknown	None	
Kong-rey	July 21 – 28	Strong typhoon	130 km/h (81 mph)	955 hPa (28.2 inHg)	None	None	None	
Yutu (Huaning)	July 22 – 26	Severe tropical storm	100 km/h (62 mph)	975 hPa (28.79 inHg)	Philippines, Vietnam, South China	$109 million	None	
Toraji (Isang)	July 25 – August 1	Strong typhoon	140 km/h (87 mph)	960 hPa (28.35 inHg)	Philippines, Taiwan, East China	$245 million	200	
Man-yi	August 1 – 9	Strong typhoon	150 km/h (93 mph)	955 hPa (28.2 inHg)	Mariana Islands	$50,000	None	
TD	August 2 – 3	Tropical depression	Not specified	1,004 hPa (29.65 inHg)	Taiwan, Ryukyu Islands	None	None	
TD	August 5 – 8	Tropical depression	Not specified	1,000 hPa (29.53 inHg)	East China, Korean Peninsula	None	None	
Usagi	August 8 – 11	Tropical storm	65 km/h (40 mph)	992 hPa (29.29 inHg)	South China, Vietnam, Laos	$3.2 million	176	
Pabuk	August 13 – 22	Strong typhoon	130 km/h (81 mph)	960 hPa (28.35 inHg)	Mariana Islands, Japan	$5.55 million	8	
Jolina	August 16 – 19	Tropical depression	55 km/h (34 mph)	998 hPa (29.47 inHg)	Philippines	None	None	
TD	August 22 – 24	Tropical depression	Not specified	1,000 hPa (29.53 inHg)	None	None	None	
TD	August 22 – 23	Tropical depression	Not specified	1,002 hPa (29.59 inHg)	None	None	None	
15W	August 24 – 28	Tropical depression	55 km/h (34 mph)	1,000 hPa (29.53 inHg)	None	None	None	
Wutip	August 26 – September 2	Very strong typhoon	165 km/h (103 mph)	930 hPa (27.46 inHg)	None	None	None	
Sepat	August 26 – 30	Tropical storm	85 km/h (53 mph)	990 hPa (29.23 inHg)	None	None	None	
Fitow	August 28 – September 1	Tropical storm	85 km/h (53 mph)	990 hPa (29.23 inHg)	South China	$202 million	4	
Danas	September 3 – 12	Very strong typhoon	155 km/h (96 mph)	945 hPa (27.91 inHg)	Japan	$9.79 million	8	
Nari (Kiko)	September 5 – 21	Strong typhoon	140 km/h (87 mph)	960 hPa (28.35 inHg)	Japan, Taiwan, East China	$443 million	104	
TD	September 5 – 7	Tropical depression	Not specified	1,002 hPa (29.59 inHg)	South China	None	None	
TD	September 8 – 10	Tropical depression	Not specified	1,000 hPa (29.53 inHg)	Taiwan, Ryukyu Islands	None	None	
TD	September 9 – 12	Tropical depression	Not specified	1,000 hPa (29.53 inHg)	South China, Vietnam	None	None	
Vipa	September 17 – 21	Strong typhoon	120 km/h (75 mph)	975 hPa (28.79 inHg)	Japan	None	None	
Francisco	September 18 – 25	Very strong typhoon	155 km/h (96 mph)	945 hPa (27.91 inHg)	None	None	None	
Lekima (Labuyo)	September 22 – 30	Strong typhoon	130 km/h (81 mph)	965 hPa (28.5 inHg)	Philippines, Taiwan, East China	Unknown	5	
Krosa	October 3 – 9	Strong typhoon	150 km/h (93 mph)	950 hPa (28.05 inHg)	Mariana Islands	None	None	
Haiyan (Maring)	October 11 – 18	Strong typhoon	130 km/h (81 mph)	960 hPa (28.35 inHg)	Taiwan, Japan	$3.4 million	2	
Podul	October 19 – 27	Very strong typhoon	185 km/h (115 mph)	925 hPa (27.32 inHg)	Caroline Islands	None	None	
TD	October 20 – 21	Tropical depression	Not specified	1,002 hPa (29.59 inHg)	Vietnam	$66.6 million	39	
Lingling (Nanang)	November 6 – 12	Very strong typhoon	155 km/h (96 mph)	940 hPa (27.76 inHg)	Philippines, Vietnam, Cambodia	$70.3 million	379	
28W (Ondoy)	November 17 – 25	Tropical depression	55 km/h (34 mph)	996 hPa (29.41 inHg)	Caroline Islands, Mariana Islands, Philippines	None	None	
29W (Pabling)	November 18 – 23	Tropical depression	55 km/h (34 mph)	1,004 hPa (29.65 inHg)	Philippines, Malaysia, Brunei, Borneo	None	None	
Kajiki (Quedan)	December 4 – 9	Tropical storm	65 km/h (40 mph)	996 hPa (29.41 inHg)	Philippines, Vietnam	$14 million	2	
31W	December 10 – 12	Tropical storm	65 km/h (40 mph)	997 hPa (29.44 inHg)	Caroline Islands	None	None	
Faxai	December 13 – 25	Violent typhoon	195 km/h (121 mph)	915 hPa (27.02 inHg)	Caroline Islands, Mariana Islands	$1 million	1	
Vamei	December 26 – 28	Tropical storm	85 km/h (53 mph)	1,006 hPa (29.71 inHg)	Singapore, Malaysia, Sumatra	$3.6 million	5	
Season aggregates
46 systems	February 17 – December 28, 2001		195 km/h (121 mph)	915 hPa (27.02 inHg)		$2.42 billion	1,714	

== See also ==
- List of Pacific typhoon seasons
- 2001 Pacific hurricane season
- 2001 Atlantic hurricane season
- 2001 North Indian Ocean cyclone season
- South-West Indian Ocean cyclone seasons: 2000–01, 2001–02
- Australian region cyclone seasons: 2000–01, 2001–02
- South Pacific cyclone seasons: 2000–01, 2001–02
