= Tropical Storm Mangkhut (2013) =

Pacific tropical storm in 2013

Tropical Storm Mangkhut (Kiko)
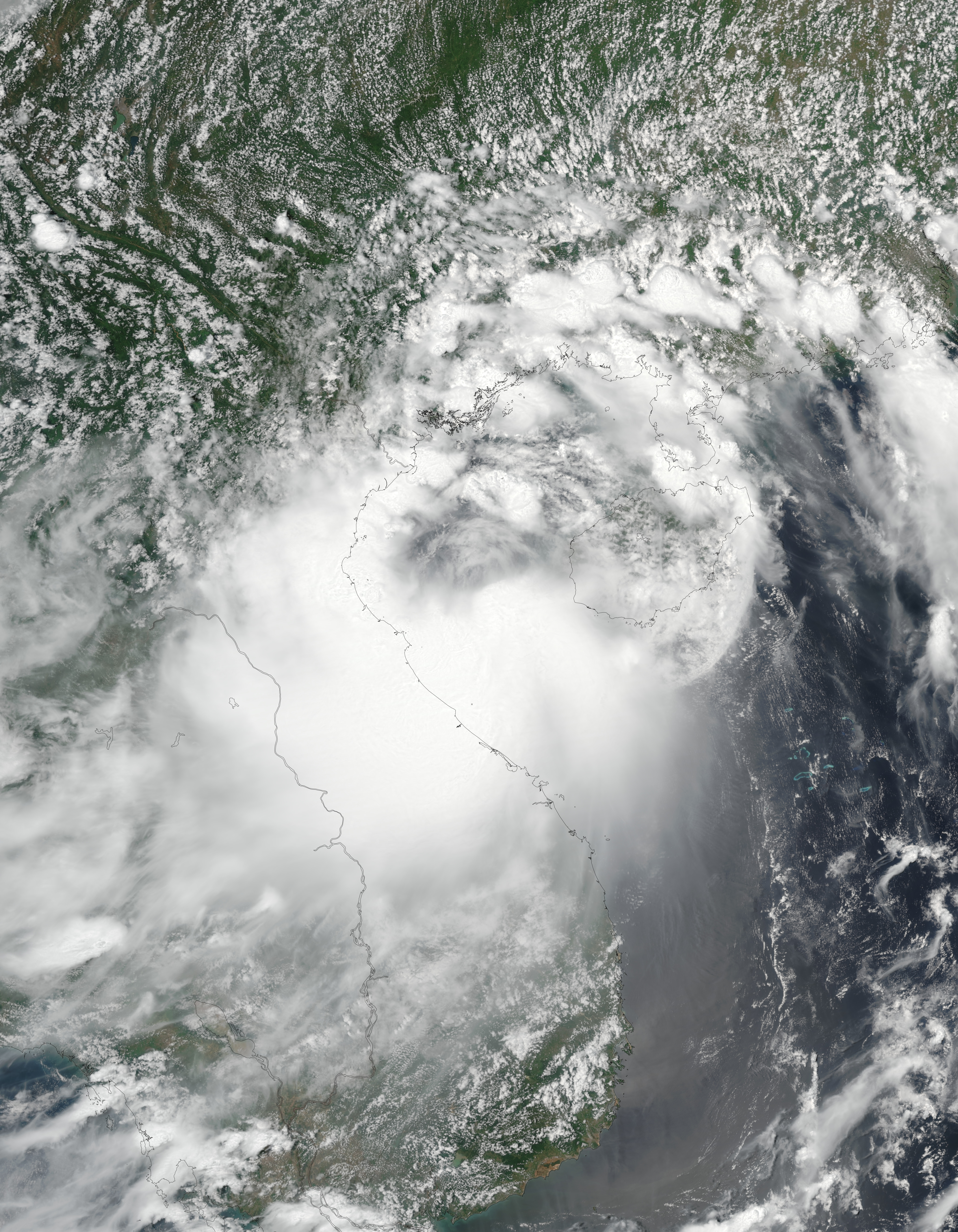
- Tropical Storm Mangkhut at peak intensity approaching Vietnam on August 7

Meteorological history
- Formed: August 5, 2013
- Dissipated: August 8, 2013

Tropical storm
- 10-minute sustained (JMA)
- Highest winds: 75 km/h (45 mph)
- Lowest pressure: 992 hPa (mbar); 29.29 inHg

Tropical storm
- 1-minute sustained (SSHWS/JTWC)
- Highest winds: 85 km/h (50 mph)
- Lowest pressure: 989 hPa (mbar); 29.21 inHg

Overall effects
- Fatalities: 4
- Missing: 5
- Damage: $56.1 million (2013 USD)
- Areas affected: Philippines; China; Vietnam; Laos; Thailand
- IBTrACS /
- Part of the 2013 Pacific typhoon season

Tropical Storm Mangkhut, (Note: The name Mangkhut (Thai: มังคุด, [maŋ˧ kʰut̚˦˥]) was contributed by Thailand and means mangosteen (Garcinia mangostana) in Thai.) known in the Philippines as Tropical Depression Kiko, was a storm that made landfall in Vietnam during August 7 and 8, 2013. The 10th named storm of this season. Shortly after Tropical Storm Jebi made landfall over northern Vietnam, another area of low pressure was recognized northeast of Puerto Princesa, Palawan, the system is also favorable for any intensification. After being named Kiko by PAGASA, the storm consolidated further, resulting in being named Mangkhut as it intensified into a tropical storm. Mangkhut moved north-northwest before making landfall over northern Vietnam. The system later dissipated at Laos on August 8.

At least 3 people were killed, due to strong winds and flash floods. Mangkhut was the first storm to form during August and nearly had the same track as Tropical Storm Jebi a week prior.

== Meteorological history ==
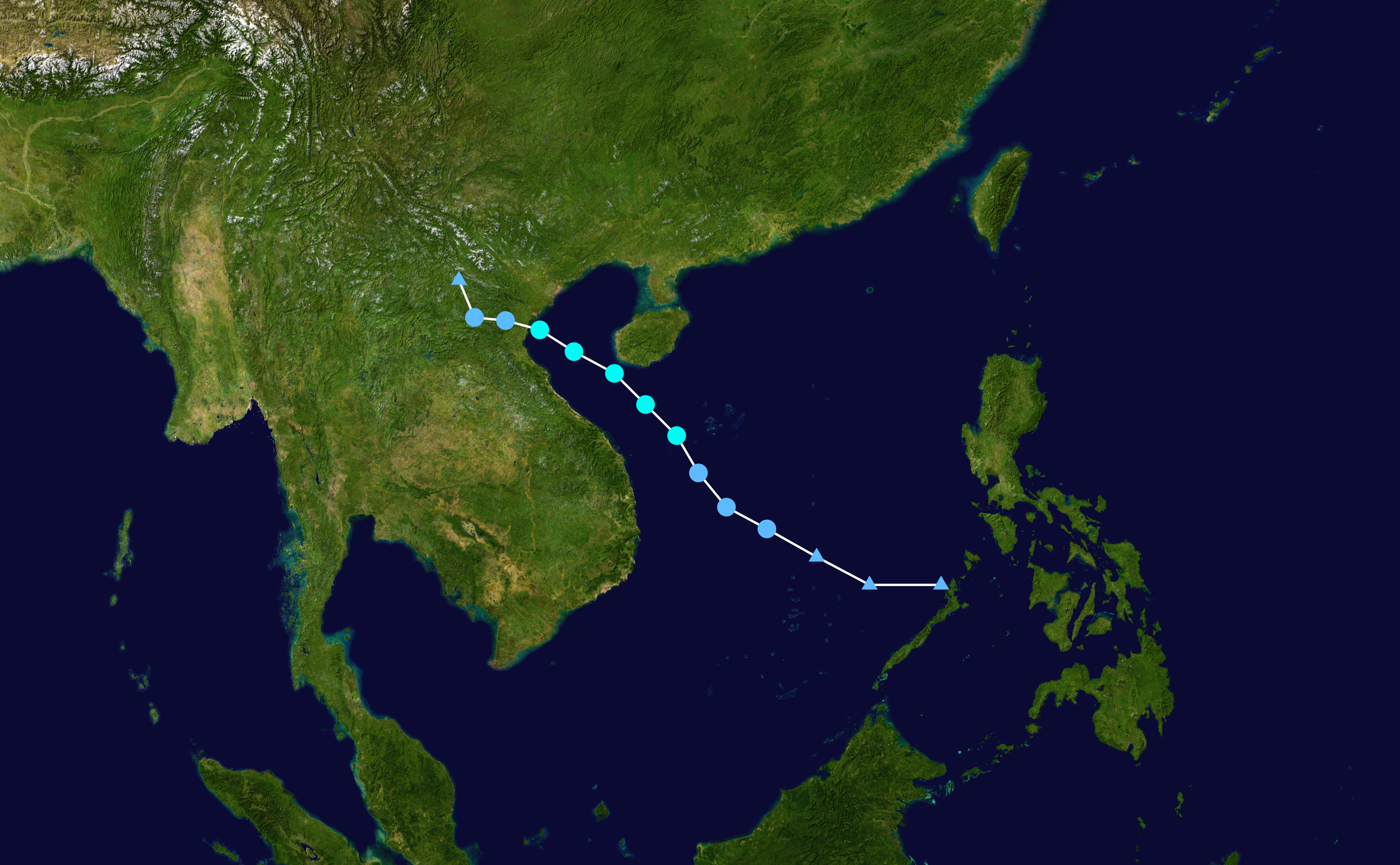
Map plotting the storm's track and intensity, according to the Saffir–Simpson scale Map key Saffir–Simpson scale Tropical depression (≤38 mph, ≤62 km/h) Tropical storm (39–73 mph, 63–118 km/h) Category 1 (74–95 mph, 119–153 km/h) Category 2 (96–110 mph, 154–177 km/h) Category 3 (111–129 mph, 178–208 km/h) Category 4 (130–156 mph, 209–251 km/h) Category 5 (≥157 mph, ≥252 km/h) Unknown Storm type Tropical cyclone Subtropical cyclone Extratropical cyclone, remnant low, tropical disturbance, or monsoon depression

A broad low pressure area formed east of Mindanao, Philippines on August 3, after Jebi made landfall over northern Vietnam and dissipated. Early on August 5, the JMA and PAGASA reported that a tropical depression had developed within a favourable environment for further development, about 145 km (90 mi) to the northeast of Puerto Princesa in Palawan with the latter naming it as Kiko.

Later that day as the system consolidated further the JMA reported that the depression had developed into a tropical storm and named it Mangkhut, before the JTWC initiated advisories and designated it as Tropical Depression 10W.

Over the next couple of days the system moved towards the north-northwest before it made landfall in Northern Vietnam during August 7. Later that day, it was said that 2 people died due to strong winds and falling debris. On August 8, Mangkhut was weakened to a tropical depression by the JMA, and JTWC later that day. Mangkhut was then last noted early the next day as it dissipated over Laos. During August 9, a total of 3 people were killed.

== Impact ==
=== Vietnam ===
In the afternoon of August 7, a teenager named Pham Thanh Son (16 years old, resident of Dang Giang Ward, Ngo Quyen District) heard information about Mangkhut affecting Hai Phong, so he and his three friends took two motorbikes to go watch the storm. All 4 people stopped at the beach area in front of the Hai Yen hotel to watch the waves. Son ran along the embankment all by himself, and he was suddenly swept into the sea by the waves. Downpours throughout Wednesday night, August 7 until Thursday, August 8 dropped rainfall 80 mm (3.1 in) deep on streets of the capital, causing difficulties for many people going to work. Meanwhile, rainfall totals went up to about 300 mm (12 in) in central Thanh Hóa and northern Hai Phong city, with wind speeds hitting 62–88 km/h (40–55 mph).

Tropical Storm Mangkhut weakened as it made landfall over Thanh Hóa Province and Ninh Bình Province delta late evening on 7 August. A peak gust of 30 m/s was recorded at Nam Dinh, and accumulated precipitation total during the time of Mangkhut over Southeast part of Vietnam was 336mm which was recorded at Ky Anh. A central pressure value of 992.2mb was also recorded at 15:20 UTC in Thanh Hoa city. Four persons were killed, five were injured due to the impact of Mangkhut.

Total damage in Vietnam reached 1.3 trillion dong (US$56.1 million).

== See also ==
- Other tropical cyclones named Mangkhut
- Other tropical cyclones named Kiko
- Tropical Storm Koni
- Tropical Storm Kelly
