= List of storms named Durian =

The name Durian (Thai: ทุเรียน, [tʰú(ʔ).rīan]) has been used for two tropical cyclones in the western North Pacific Ocean. The name was contributed by Thailand and means durian (Durio zibethinus) in Thai.

- Severe Tropical Storm Durian (2001) (T0103, 05W) – a severe tropical storm that made landfall in China and caused the worst flooding in northern Vietnam in four decades.
- Typhoon Durian (2006) (T0621, 24W, Reming) – a deadly Category 4-equivalent super typhoon that made landfalls in the Philippines and Vietnam.

The name Durian was retired following the 2006 Pacific typhoon season and was replaced with Mangkhut.

== See also ==
Similar names that have been used for tropical cyclones:

- Cyclone Darian (2022) – used in the Australian region.
