= List of storms named Mangkhut =

The name Mangkhut (Thai: มังคุด, pronounced [māŋ.kʰút]) has been used for two tropical cyclones in the northwestern Pacific Ocean. The name was contributed by Thailand and means mangosteen (Garcinia mangostana) in Thai. It replaced Durian.

- Tropical Storm Mangkhut (2013) (T1310, 10W, Kiko) – a weak storm that affected Northern Vietnam.
- Typhoon Mangkhut (2018) (T1822, 26W, Ompong) – a destructive Category 5 super typhoon that made landfall in Baggao, Cagayan in the Philippines and subsequently impacted Hong Kong and southern China.

The name Mangkhut was retired after the 2018 Pacific typhoon season and was replaced with Krathon (Thai: กระท้อน, pronounced [krā.tʰɔ́ːn]), which means santol (Sandoricum koetjape) in Thai. The name was first (and only) used in 2024.

- Typhoon Krathon (2024) (T2418, 20W, Julian) – an erratic Category 4 super typhoon that affected the Batanes and made landfall over southwestern Taiwan.

The name Krathon was retired after the 2024 Pacific typhoon season and was replaced with Burapha (Thai: บูรพา, pronounced [būː.rā.pʰāː]) which means east in Thai.
