= Tropical Storm Durian (2001) =

Pacific severe tropical storm in 2001

Severe Tropical Storm Durian
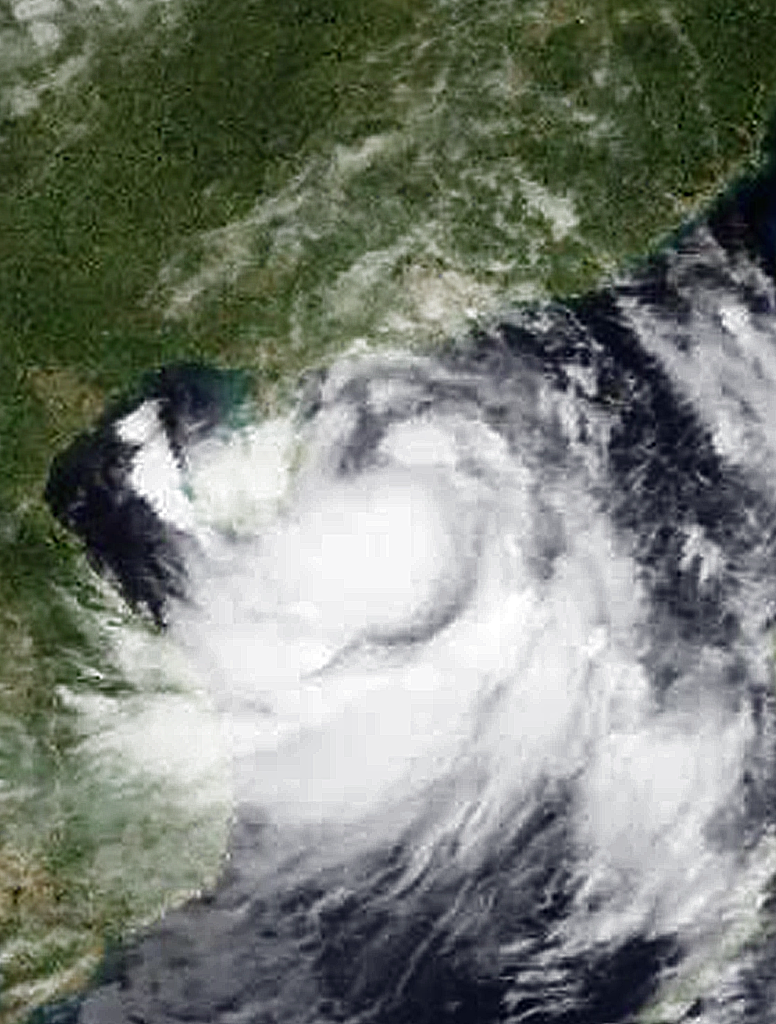
- Durian near peak intensity on July 1

Meteorological history
- Formed: June 29, 2001
- Dissipated: July 2, 2001

Severe tropical storm
- 10-minute sustained (JMA)
- Highest winds: 110 km/h (70 mph)
- Lowest pressure: 970 hPa (mbar); 28.64 inHg

Category 1-equivalent typhoon
- 1-minute sustained (SSHWS/JTWC)
- Highest winds: 140 km/h (85 mph)
- Lowest pressure: 967 hPa (mbar); 28.56 inHg

Overall effects
- Fatalities: 97 total
- Damage: $449 million (2001 USD)
- Areas affected: China; Vietnam
- IBTrACS
- Part of the 2001 Pacific typhoon season

Severe Tropical Storm Durian (Note: The name Durian (Thai: ทุเรียน, [tʰu˦˥(ʔ) ria̯n˧]) was contributed by Thailand and means durian (Durio zibethinus) in Thai.) was a deadly system that caused severe impacts in China and Vietnam in late-June and early-July 2001. The seventh tropical depression and third named storm of the 2001 Pacific typhoon season, the storm was first noted on June 29 and quickly intensified into a tropical storm and given the name Durian by the Japan Meteorological Agency (JMA). Durian continued northwestward before intensifying into a severe tropical storm as it approached the Chinese coast. On July 1 just before landfall, Durian peaked in intensity, with the JMA estimating 10-min winds of 110 km/h (68 mph) and the Joint Typhoon Warning Center (JTWC) estimating 1-min winds of 140 km/h (87 mph). Durian made landfall on Zhanjiang at peak intensity, before quickly weakening over land and dissipating on July 3 over the mountains of Vietnam.

In China, Durian caused 65 deaths and 4.5 billion yuan ($449 million) in damages, with thousands of houses being destroyed and 180 thousand hectares of farmland being damaged. In Northern Vietnam, flooding from the storm caused 23 deaths, with the aforementioned flooding being the worst recorded in 40 years.

== Meteorological history ==
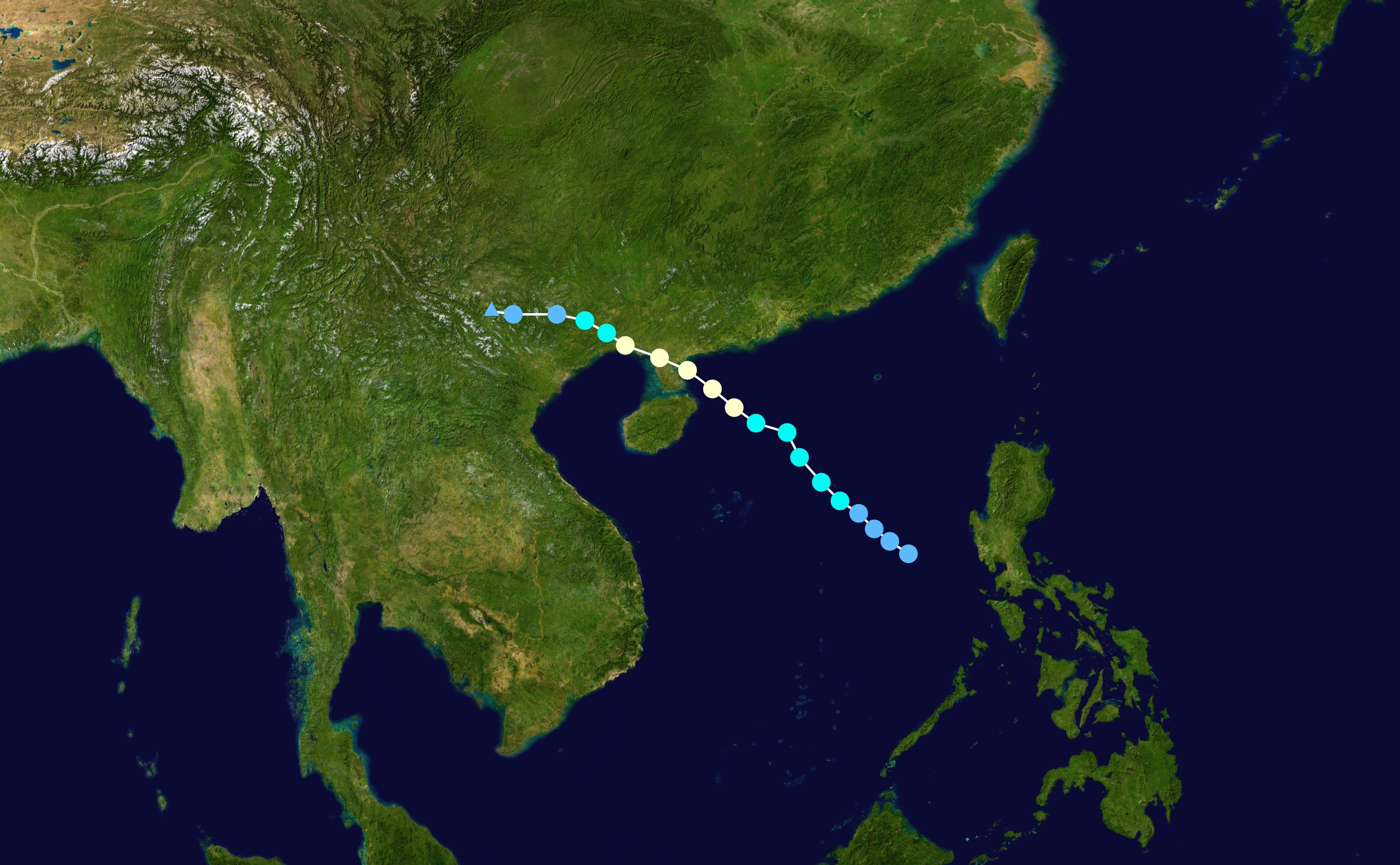
Map plotting the storm's track and intensity, according to the Saffir–Simpson scale Map key Saffir–Simpson scale Tropical depression (≤38 mph, ≤62 km/h) Tropical storm (39–73 mph, 63–118 km/h) Category 1 (74–95 mph, 119–153 km/h) Category 2 (96–110 mph, 154–177 km/h) Category 3 (111–129 mph, 178–208 km/h) Category 4 (130–156 mph, 209–251 km/h) Category 5 (≥157 mph, ≥252 km/h) Unknown Storm type Tropical cyclone Subtropical cyclone Extratropical cyclone, remnant low, tropical disturbance, or monsoon depression

On June 29 at 00:30 UTC, the JTWC noted a developing area of convection in the South China Sea, with the JTWC assessing it fair for development potential. Early morning satellite imagery indicated cyclonically curved cloud lines and a circulation inside the monsoon trough over the area, though moderate vertical wind shear present appeared to somewhat hinder development. At 6:00 UTC the same day, the JMA classified the system as a tropical depression, with the JTWC issuing a Tropical Cyclone Formation Alert (TCFA) a few hours later, having noted reports of pressure falls and increasing winds. The JTWC later followed suit, upgrading the system to Tropical Depression 05W at 18:00 UTC. The next day at 0:00 UTC, the JTWC upgraded the system to a tropical storm, with the JMA following 6 hours later, giving it the name Durian. Durian continued on a northwesterly track due to a subtropical ridge extending from a mid-level high south of Kyushu, and at 18:00 UTC the same day, the JMA upgraded Durian to a severe tropical storm. Hours later on July 1 at 6:00 UTC, the JTWC upgraded Durian to a typhoon as it was situated about 200 nm southwest of Hong Kong, with the Hong Kong Observatory (HKO) upgrading it later in the day. Satellite imagery at the time showed a small yet well-defined eye, with radar indicating the diameter of the eye was 20 km. At 18:00 UTC the same day, the JTWC and JMA estimated that Durian had peaked with 1-min winds of 140 km/h (87 mph) and 10-min winds of 110 km/h (68 mph) just east of the Leizhou Peninsula, with a minimum central pressure of 970 hPa. Gales from the storm covered an area roughly 150 nm in diameter. The HKO also estimated Durian's peak with winds of 130 km/h (81 mph) and a minimum central pressure of 965 hPa. At approximately 22:00 UTC, Durian made landfall in the vicinity of Zhanjiang at peak intensity. After making landfall, Durian began to weaken rapidly, losing typhoon status as it moved into the northern Gulf of Tonkin and tracked into Guangxi, with the JTWC issuing its final warning on the system at 18:00 UTC on July 2. The JMA also downgraded Durian to a tropical depression as it was situated around Nanning. Durian fully dissipated on July 3 as it entered the mountainous terrain in Northern Vietnam.

== Preparations and impacts ==
=== Hong Kong and China ===
At 7:40 pm local time on June 30, the Standby Signal No. 1 was raised in Hong Kong, with the Strong Wind Signal No. 3 being raised later in the day at 10:20 pm. All tropical cyclone warnings were lifted on July 2 at 9:20 am.

Throughout the provinces of Guangdong, Guangxi, and Hainan, more than 4.3 million people were affected, with over 13 thousand houses being destroyed. In Zhanjiang, a press report mentioned that 305 mm of rain fell in the city, with Nanning receiving 209 mm of rainfall. 21 people went missing off the coast of Guangdong, with 30 flights being cancelled in Hainan. In Zhanjiang, 180 thousand hectares of farmland were damaged, along with sugarcane fields and banana trees being destroyed and the deaths of more than 52 thousand farm animals. In Hong Kong, a waterspout was observed in the Tathong Channel at around 12:50 pm before dissipating over land. A woman was injured by a wooden board lifted by wind in Hong Kong, with several reports of fallen trees and collapsed scaffolding throughout the city. In Jordan Valley, accumulated rainfall from the storm was observed at 190.5 mm, with storm surge in Hong Kong peaking at 0.56 meters on July 1. Overall, Durian caused 65 deaths and 4.5 billion yuan ($449 million) in China, with the China Meteorological Administration (CMA) reporting over 500 people injured.

=== Vietnam ===
In Northern Vietnam, 32 people were killed and 3 people went missing, with more than 20 thousand homes being destroyed by flooding. Durian was responsible for some of the worst flooding in Northern Vietnam for 40 years, with the Vietnam Hydrometeorological Service reporting rainfall of up to 17 inches between July 2 and 4. The Vietnamese military sent amphibious vehicles to aid rescue efforts in the province of Thái Nguyên. In the provinces affected, 80 percent of the area was estimated to be partially flooded, with waters in the Lô River rising 2.6 meters above Alarm Level III.

== See also ==
- Other tropical cyclones named Durian
- Tropical cyclones in 2001
- Tropical Storm Utor (2001) – A storm that impacted the same areas days later
- Tropical Storm Wutip (2025) – A storm with a similar track occurring at about the same time of year
