= List of storms named Faxai =

The name Faxai (Lao: ຟ້າໃສ, [faː˥˨ saj˩]) has been used for four tropical cyclones in the western North Pacific Ocean. The name was contributed by Laos and is a feminine given name meaning "clear skies" in Lao.

- Typhoon Faxai (2001) (T0125, 33W) – an intense late-season typhoon that stayed out to sea.
- Severe Tropical Storm Faxai (2007) (T0720, 20W, Juaning) – approached Japan.
- Typhoon Faxai (2014) (T1403, 03W) – had no effects on land.
- Typhoon Faxai (2019) (T1915, 14W) – Category 4 typhoon that made landfall in the Kantō region of Japan.

The name Faxai was retired following the 2019 Pacific typhoon season and was replaced with Nongfa (Lao: ໜອງຟ້າ, [nɔːŋ˩ faː˥˨]), which refers to Nong Fa Lake in Lao.

- Tropical Storm Nongfa (2025) (T2514, 20W, Jacinto) – affected the Philippines and made landfall over Vietnam
