= Typhoon Faxai (2001) =

Pacific typhoon in 2001

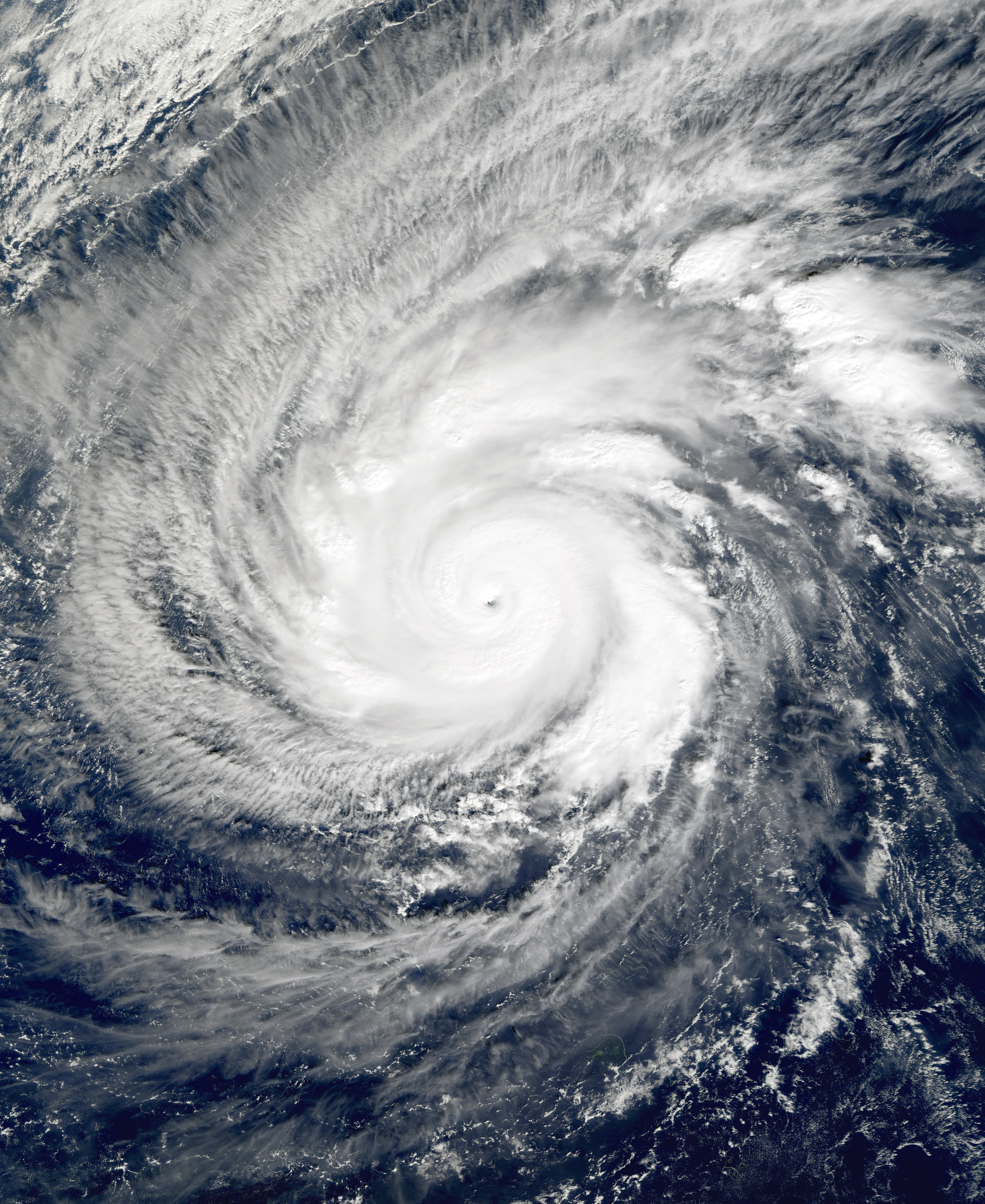
- Faxai at peak intensity on December 23

Meteorological history
- Formed: December 13, 2001
- Extratropical: December 25, 2001
- Dissipated: December 26, 2001

Violent typhoon
- 10-minute sustained (JMA)
- Highest winds: 195 km/h (120 mph)
- Lowest pressure: 915 hPa (mbar); 27.02 inHg

Category 5-equivalent super typhoon
- 1-minute sustained (SSHWS/JTWC)
- Highest winds: 285 km/h (180 mph)
- Lowest pressure: 879 hPa (mbar); 25.96 inHg

Overall effects
- Fatalities: 2 total
- Damage: $1 million (2001 USD)
- Areas affected: Federated States of Micronesia, Mariana Islands
- IBTrACS
- Part of the 2001 Pacific typhoon season

Typhoon Faxai (Note: The name Faxai (Lao: ຟ້າໃສ, [faː˥˨ saj˩]) was contributed by Laos and is a feminine given name meaning "clear skies" in Lao.) was the strongest tropical cyclone worldwide in 2001. The twenty-fifth named storm and the sixteenth typhoon of the 2001 Pacific typhoon season, Faxai originated from a circulation in the monsoon trough. The system remained stationary for several days near Kosrae, pouring heavy rain that knocked down power. An indirect death occurred on the island as well. As the storm steadily intensified, Faxai moved west-northwestward at a very slow pace as it neared Pingelap, damaging crops, before bringing strong winds and rainfall that produced two landslides in Pohnpei on December 20. Intensity fluctuated, but convection in the core became more defined and by December 21, Faxai had intensified into a typhoon. A period of rapid intensification then followed, and by early December 23, Faxai reached its peak intensity.

Preparations were ordered as Faxai approached the Mariana Islands, which included a state of emergency on Guam being declared. Faxai produced swells, causing rip currents that drowned a man in Guam. An eyewall replacement cycle was initiated as Faxai began to weaken. On December 24, Faxai recurved north-northeastward, approaching the island of Agrihan, before transitioning into an extratropical cyclone on Christmas Day. Agrihan endured powerful winds, but reported minimal damage. The storm's remnants were last marked far west-northwest of Midway Atoll on December 26, before dissipating on that same day. In total, Faxai caused damage of $1 million throughout the affected areas.

== Meteorological history ==
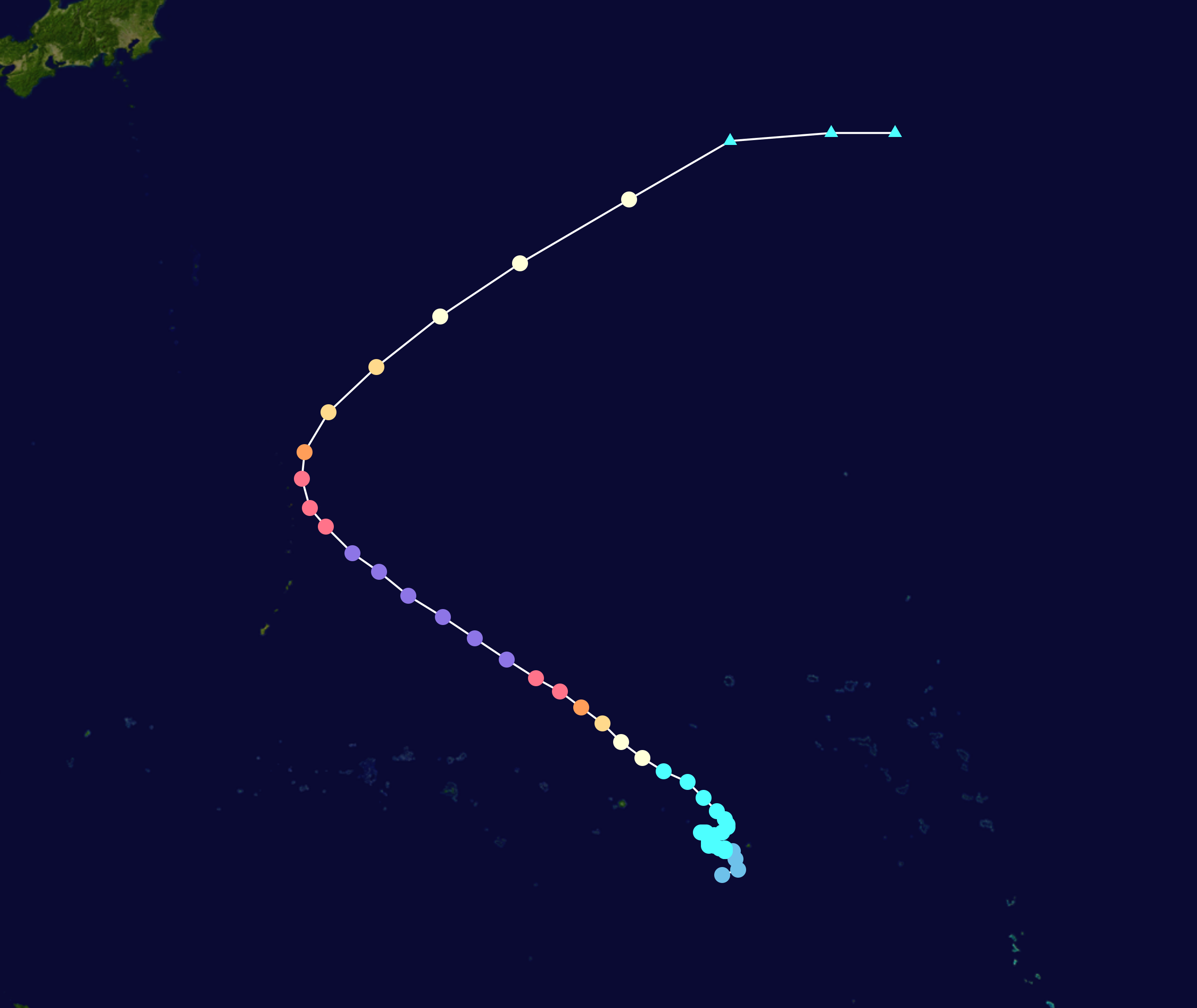
Map plotting the storm's track and intensity, according to the Saffir–Simpson scale Map key Saffir–Simpson scale Tropical depression (≤38 mph, ≤62 km/h) Tropical storm (39–73 mph, 63–118 km/h) Category 1 (74–95 mph, 119–153 km/h) Category 2 (96–110 mph, 154–177 km/h) Category 3 (111–129 mph, 178–208 km/h) Category 4 (130–156 mph, 209–251 km/h) Category 5 (≥157 mph, ≥252 km/h) Unknown Storm type Tropical cyclone Subtropical cyclone Extratropical cyclone, remnant low, tropical disturbance, or monsoon depression

The origins of Typhoon Faxai are traced back to a low-latitude monsoon trough in the Caroline Islands that spawned a circulation. Operationally, Faxai was designated the numeral identifier 31W by the Joint Typhoon Warning Center (JTWC), as Faxai and another tropical cyclone were considered to be one tropical cyclone; however, post-season analysis determined that Faxai's low-level circulation center (LLCC) had developed near Kosrae after the dissipation of the other cyclone's circulation. As such, Faxai was re-designated as 33W. On December 13, the system that became Faxai had intensified into a tropical depression southeast of Pohnpei.

For several days, the nascent cyclone stationed in the vicinity of Kosrae. It oscillated near the 5th parallel due to the broad and ill-defined center being difficult to locate. Other factors encompass an interaction with a shear line that spanned toward the system from the northeast, a slightly weak subtropical ridge and a sequence of westerly wind bursts. During the period, the JTWC upgraded the cyclone to a tropical storm early on December 15. Though with no change in intensity, organization very slowly increased, and by 18:00 UTC of the next day, the Japan Meteorological Agency (JMA) designated the system a tropical storm and gave it the name Faxai.

The tropical storm moved west-northwestward very slowly and entered a point 324 km (201 mi) east-southeast of Pohnpei on December 17. Around later that day, the Special Sensor Microwave/Imager detected early stages of eyewall development. On December 18, Faxai remained nearly stationary before steering eastward, as the easterlies and the equatorial westerlies dragged the storm in between back and forth. Vertical wind shear around the storm increased due to the easterlies in the tropics and upper troposphere, starting a weakening trend. Early on December 20, Faxai commenced its northwestward path. Intensification of inner-core convection fluctuated as an outer rainband became more defined. At 06:00 UTC, Faxai intensified into a severe tropical storm northeast of Pohnpei. After continuous strengthening, the JTWC estimated that Faxai was a typhoon at 18:00 UTC, followed by the JMA six hours later on December 21.

At that time, rapid intensification ensued for 18 hours, with 1-minute winds increasing from 140 km/h (85 mph) to 220 km/h (140 mph). An upper-level ridge north of Faxai slightly weakened, allowing poleward outflow to develop. Faxai continued to strengthen rapidly, and after six hours, became the year's third and final super typhoon with winds of 250 km/h (155 mph). Additional intensification commenced with very conducive outflow and the primary rainband consolidating, and by the beginning of the next day, Faxai achieved its peak intensity; 10-minute winds of 195 km/h (120 mph) and the lowest atmospheric pressure of 915 hPa (27.02 inHg) were assessed by the JMA, whereas 1-minute winds were assessed at 285 km/h (180 mph) by the JTWC. Around that time, Faxai displayed concentric eyewalls holding a 15 km (9.2 mi) eye.

Not long after peak intensity, the compact irregular eye became cloud-filled, becoming replaced by a ragged banding eye feature, as wind speed began to decrease. Convection in the southeast quadrant began to wear off. Furthermore, dry air invaded the western side of the storm. On Christmas Eve, Faxai recurved about 65 km (40 mi) east of Agrihan as it gradually weakened. The degrading was temporarily halted by a slight burst of deep convection as Faxai accelerated north-northeastward at 30 km/h (20 mph), before Faxai revealed signs of a transition into an extratropical cyclone. On Christmas Day, convection over the western portion greatly decreased. The LLCC and convection, however, remained well-organized during the extratropical transition. At 06:00 UTC, Faxai weakened back into a severe tropical storm. The JTWC then declared that Faxai had completed its transition into an extratropical cyclone at 18:00 UTC. Moving east-northeastward at 80 km/h (50 mph) on December 26, Faxai's remnants were last noted 1,200 km (750 mi) west-northwest of Midway Atoll by the JMA, before they dissipated at 12:00 UTC.

== Preparations and impact ==
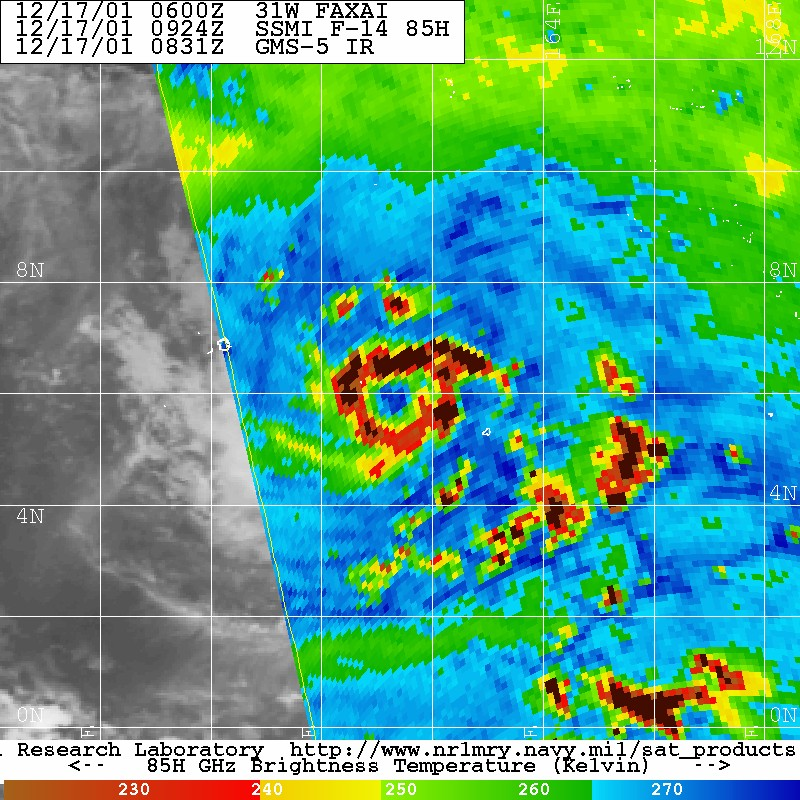
Microwave imagery of Tropical Storm Faxai on December 17, indicating an eyewall, while near Kosrae and Pohnpei

While the storm was operationally labeled Tropical Depression 31W, the National Weather Service office in Tiyan, Guam issued a tropical storm watch for Kosrae on December 13, before extending it across Pohnpei, Mokil, and Pingelap the next day; the watch for Kosrae was soon upgraded to a warning later that day. A tropical storm warning was then hoisted for Pingelap on December 15, and later for Mokil. A typhoon warning was then issued for Mokil and Pohnpei as Faxai intensified on December 17.

Tropical Storm Faxai was within 48 km (30 mi) west-southwest of Kosrae during December 16. Throughout the previous day, the system poured 10.74 in (273 mm) of rain, and from December 13 to 18, 24.76 in (629 mm) of rain fell upon the island. Wind gusts of nearly 75 km/h (45 mph) were recorded, with peak gusts assessed at 80 km/h (50 mph). An indirect death of a man occurred on the island and electrical power was knocked by heavy rainfall. Damage to banana crops was also reported. The west shore of the island experienced coastal flooding, as many rocks were lifted onto the road of that shore. The storm then drifted west and tracked very near Pingelap on December 18, where winds of 45 km/h (29 mph) and gusts of 75 km/h (48 mph) were recorded. There, many banana trees were downed and some taro patches were damaged by sea water run-up. Faxai moved northwest slowly and on the 20th, produced strong winds of 55 km/h (34 mph) in Pohnpei. The storm poured heavy rain of 80 mm (3.13 in) and caused flooding and two landslides in Nett, as a constitutional convention was convened in Palikir. Overall, Faxai caused $500,000 in property damage and $400,000 of damage towards crops in the Federated States of Micronesia.

Forecasts indicated that Faxai would pass near Guam on December 24. In response, typhoon watches were instated across the islands of Guam, Rota, Tinian, and Saipan on December 22. The Governor of Guam Carl Gutierrez declared a state of emergency and Typhoon Condition 3 as Faxai approached the territory. The legislation of Guam authorized the use of $250,000 for mitigation and expenses associated with civil defense, public safety, or health emergencies; it was anticipated that Faxai had the potential to strike the island with powerful winds and inflict devastating damage. The United States Air Force's 36th Wing deployed its civil engineering squadron to secure Andersen Air Force Base. On December 22, a 69-year-old man drowned in Gun Beach, Guam from strong rip currents caused by swells from Faxai across the shoreline. He was given CPR before being transported to Guam Memorial Hospital, where he was pronounced dead. Faxai recurved and headed more towards north, passing 571 km (355 mi) northeast of Guam on the afternoon of December 23, and later passed 290 km (180 mi) north-northeast of Saipan early on the following day. The storm passed east of Agrihan by only 72 km (45 mi). Despite the strong winds the island experienced, the ten residents of the island at the time all survived. The only damage occurred when a water well was flooded by saltwater, and was estimated to be $100,000.

== See also ==
- Tropical cyclones in 2001
- Other systems named Faxai
- Typhoon Lola (1986) – A typhoon that also had a curvature identical to Faxai's.
- Typhoon Pat (1991) – Another typhoon that also had a curvature identical to Faxai's.
- Typhoon Isa (1997) – An intense typhoon that took an identical trajectory.
- Typhoon Pongsona (2002) – A Category 4-equivalent typhoon that took a comparable track.
- Typhoon Tingting (2004) – A Category 1-equivalent typhoon that affected similar areas.
- Typhoon Kong-rey (2007) – A Category 3-equivalent typhoon that took a similar track.
- Typhoon Choi-wan (2009) – A Category 5-equivalent typhoon that took an identical track.
- Typhoon Bualoi (2019) – Another Category 5-equivalent typhoon that took a comparable track.
