= Tropical cyclones in 2001 =

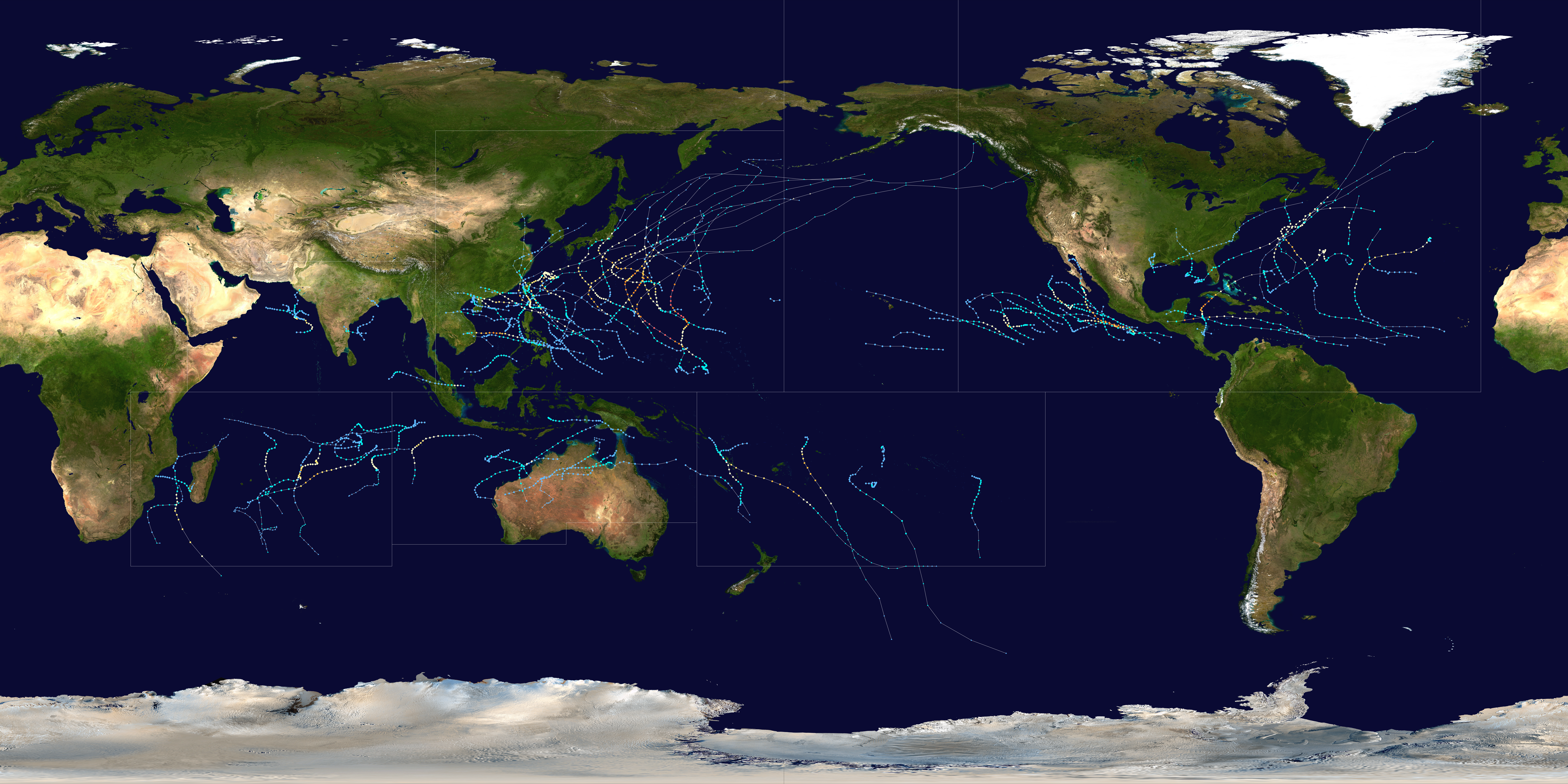
- Year summary map

Year boundaries
- First system: Ando
- Formed: December 31, 2000
- Last system: 05F
- Dissipated: January 6, 2002

Strongest system
- Name: Faxai
- Lowest pressure: 915 mbar (hPa); 27.02 inHg

Longest lasting system
- Name: Allison, Erin, and Nari
- Duration: 16 days

Year statistics
- Total systems: 124
- Named systems: 82
- Total fatalities: 2,796 total
- Total damage: $11.92 billion (2001 USD)
Related articles
- 2001 Atlantic hurricane season
- 2001 Pacific hurricane season
- 2001 Pacific typhoon season
- 2001 North Indian Ocean cyclone season
- 2000–01 South-West Indian Ocean cyclone season
- 2001–02 South-West Indian Ocean cyclone season
- 2000–01 Australian region cyclone season
- 2001–02 Australian region cyclone season
- 2000–01 South Pacific cyclone season
- 2001–02 South Pacific cyclone season

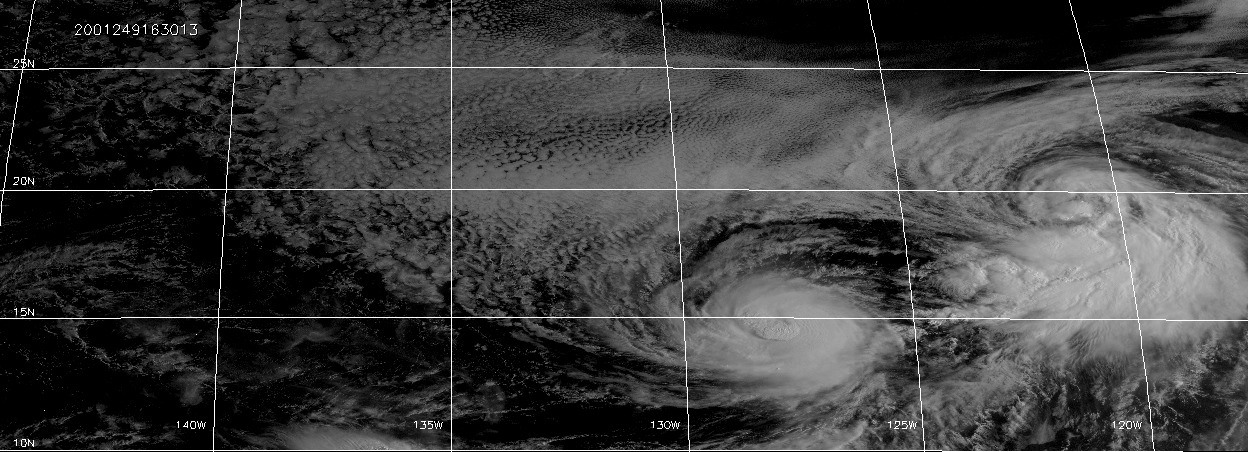
Hurricane Gil (left) and Tropical Storm Henriette (right) on September 7

During 2001, tropical cyclones formed in seven different areas called basins, located within various parts of the Atlantic, Pacific and Indian Oceans. A total of 128 tropical cyclones formed within bodies of water known as tropical cyclone basins, with 83 of them were further named by the responsible weather agencies when they attained maximum sustained winds of 35 knots (65 km/h; 40 mph). Typhoon Faxai is the strongest tropical cyclone throughout the year, peaking with a pressure of 915 hPa (27.02 inHg) and attaining 10-minute sustained winds of 195 km/h (120 mph). The deadliest tropical cyclone of the year was Lingling in the West Pacific which caused 379 fatalities in total as it struck the Philippines and Vietnam, while the costliest storm of the year was Michelle, with a damage cost of around $2.43 billion as it catastrophically affected the Greater Antilles and the Bahamas in late October. So far, 23 Category 3 tropical cyclones formed, including two Category 5 tropical cyclones formed in the year. The accumulated cyclone energy (ACE) index for the 2001 (seven basins combined), as calculated by Colorado State University was 672.4 units.

== Global atmospheric and hydrological conditions ==
La Niña is a weather pattern that occurs every few years, as a result of complex variations on the ocean temperatures in the equatorial band of the Pacific Ocean. The 1998–2001 La Niña persisted through early 2001, which made the waters of Pacific Ocean, and the Atlantic Ocean warmer than normal.

== Systems ==
=== January ===
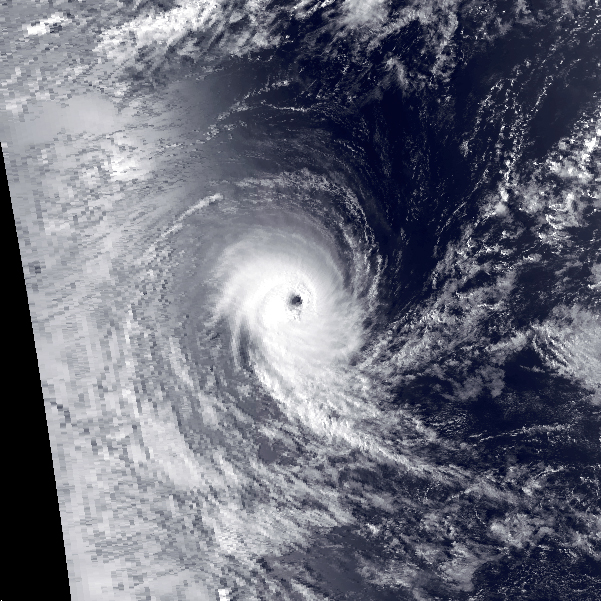
Cyclone Charly

In January, the Intertropical Convergence Zone (ITCZ), which allows for the formation of tropical waves, is located in the Southern Hemisphere, remaining there until May. This limits Northern Hemisphere cyclone formation to comparatively rare non-tropical sources. In addition, the month's climate is also an important factor. In the Southern Hemisphere basins, January, at the height of the austral summer, is the most active month by cumulative number of storms since records began. Of the four Northern Hemisphere basins, none is very active in January, as the month is during the winter, but the most active basin is the Western Pacific, which occasionally sees weak tropical storms form during the month.
January was very inactive despite this, with only five storms forming, three getting named, all in the southern hemisphere. In the Australian basin, Cyclone Terri affected Western Australia, but caused no damage. The rest of the activity was confined to the Southwestern Indian Ocean, with two unnamed tropical depressions, and cyclones Bindu and Charly forming, with the latter being the most intense tropical cyclone this month. Two storms, Typhoon Soulik, and Cyclone Ando have also formed in December 2000, and persisted into 2001.

Tropical cyclones formed in January 2001
Storm name	Dates active	Max wind km/h (mph)	Pressure (hPa)	Areas affected	Damage (USD)	Deaths	Refs
Bindu	January 3–17	150 (90)	955	Rodrigues	None	None	
Charly	January 17–31	185 (115)	930	Rodrigues, Mauritius, Réunion	None	None	
06	January 22–24	Not specified	Not specified	Réunion, Madagascar	None	None	
Terri	January 27–31	110 (70)	975	Western Australia	None	None	
07	January 30 – February 3	Not specified	Not specified	None	None	None	

=== February ===
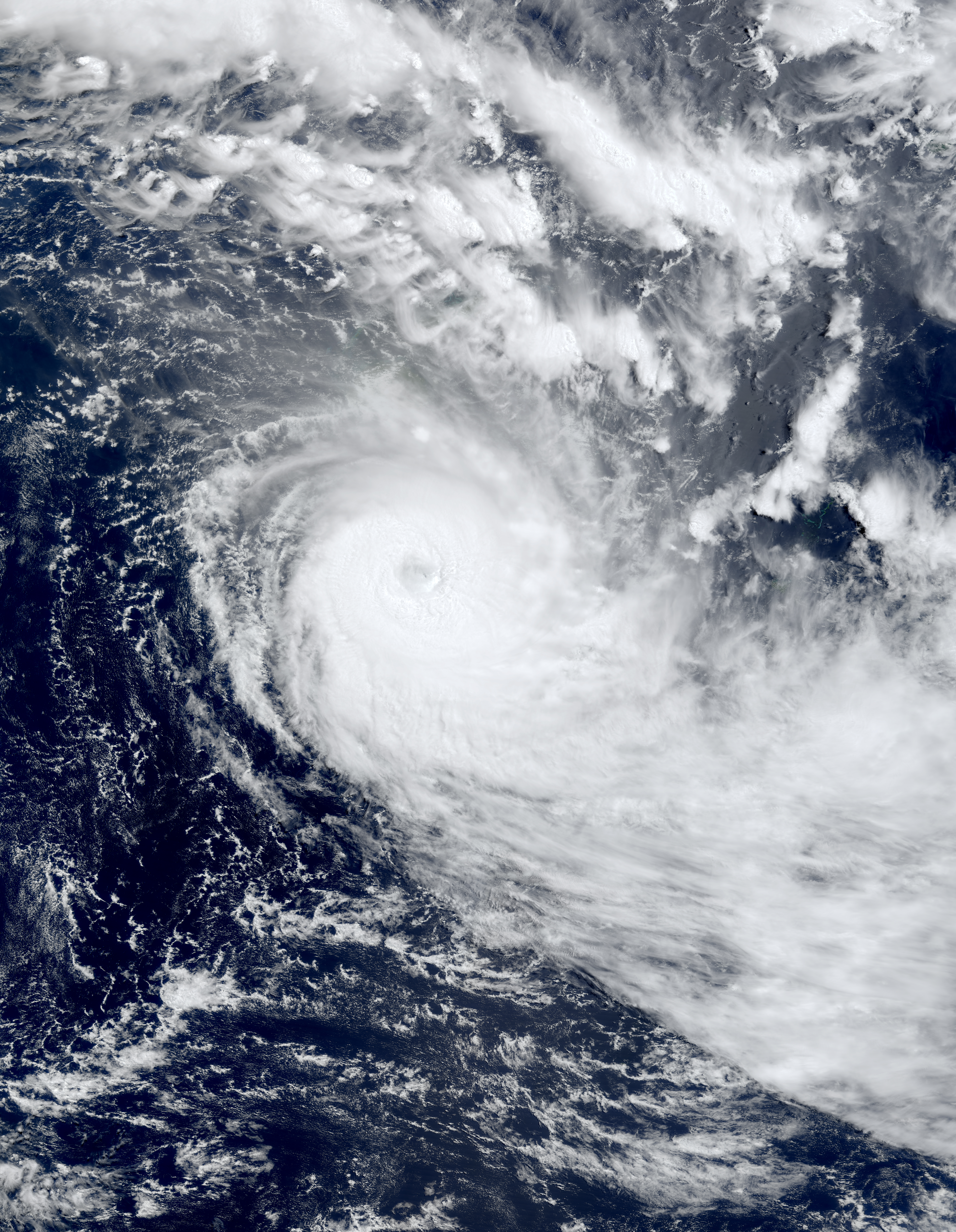
Cyclone Paula

In terms of activity, February is normally similar to January, with activity effectively restricted to the Southern Hemisphere excepting the rare Western Pacific storm. In fact, in the Southern Hemisphere, due to the monsoon being at its height, February tends to see more formation of strong tropical cyclones than January despite seeing marginally fewer overall storms. In the Northern Hemisphere, February is the least active month, with no Eastern or Central Pacific tropical cyclones and only one Atlantic tropical cyclone having ever formed in the month. Even in the Western Pacific, February activity is low: in 1992, the month had never seen a typhoon-strength storm, the first being Typhoon Higos in 2015.
Within February, ten storms have formed, of which seven were officially named, with another storm, Auring, receiving a name that is deemed unofficial outside of the Philippines. No storms formed within the Southwestern Indian Ocean this month. In the Australian basin, cyclones Vincent, Winsome, Wylva, and Abigail formed, all of which affected landmasses, but most remained relatively weak. In the South Pacific, cyclones Oma, Paula, the strongest storm this month, and Rita formed, with Oma and Paula affecting landmasses.

Tropical cyclones formed in February 2001
Storm name	Dates active	Max wind km/h (mph)	Pressure (hPa)	Areas affected	Damage (USD)	Deaths	Refs
Vincent	February 7 – 15	85 (50)	980	Western Australia	None	None	
Winsome	February 8 – 14	75 (45)	981	Northern Territory	None	2	
Wylva	February 14 – 22	75 (45)	988	Queensland, Northern Territory, Western Australia	None	None	
10P	February 16	55 (35)	1000	None	None	None	
07F	February 16 – 18	55 (35)	993	New Caledonia	None	None	
01W (Auring)	February 17 – 20	55 (35)	1004	Philippines	Unknown	15	
Oma	February 20 – 22	95 (60)	984	Cook Islands	Minor	None	
Abigail	February 24 – March 8	120 (75)	970	Queensland, Northern Territory, Western Australia	None	None	
Paula	February 26 – March 4	175 (110)	930	Vanuatu, Fiji	$1.39 million	2	
Rita	February 27 – March 5	85 (50)	986	None	None	None	

=== March ===
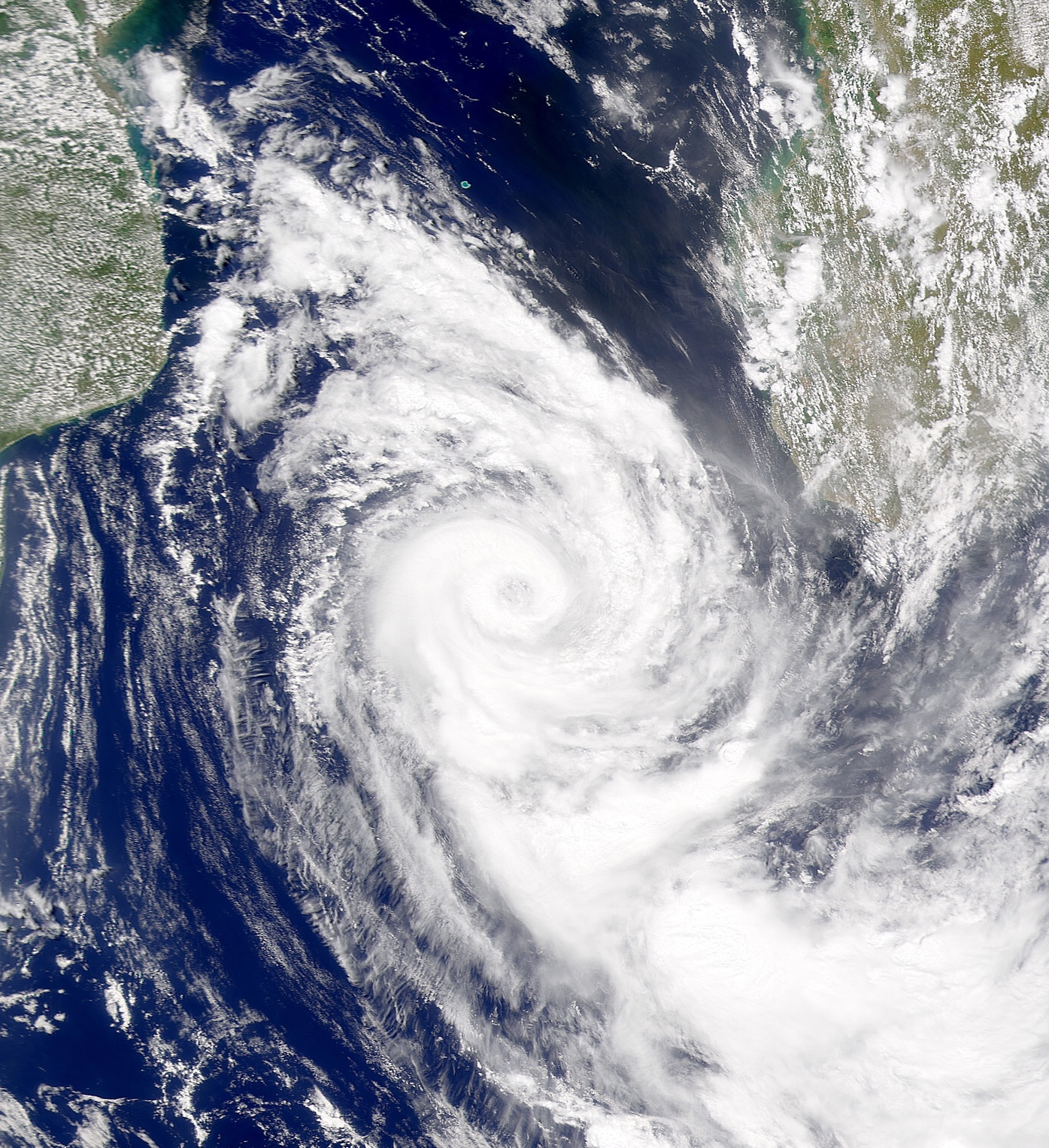
Cyclone Dera

During March, activity tends to be lower than in preceding months. In the Southern Hemisphere, the peak of the season has normally already passed, and the monsoon has begun to weaken, decreasing cyclonic activity, however, the month often sees more intense tropical cyclones than January or February. Meanwhile, in the Northern Hemisphere basins, sea surface temperatures are still far too low to normally support tropical cyclogenesis. The exception is the Western Pacific, which usually sees its first storm, often a weak depression, at some point between January and April.
March 2001 was an example of this phenomenon, with only three storms forming, and only one, Cyclone Dera, getting named. Thusly, Cyclone Dera is also the strongest storm this month, both in terms of maximum sustained winds and minimum barometric pressure.

Tropical cyclones formed in March 2001
Storm name	Dates active	Max wind km/h (mph)	Pressure (hPa)	Areas affected	Damage (USD)	Deaths	Refs
11F	March 1–3	Not specified	Not specified	None	None	None	
12F	March 1–3	Not specified	Not specified	None	None	None	
Dera	March 4–12	150 (90)	955	Europa Island, Mayotte, Comoros, Mozambique	Unknown	2	

=== April ===
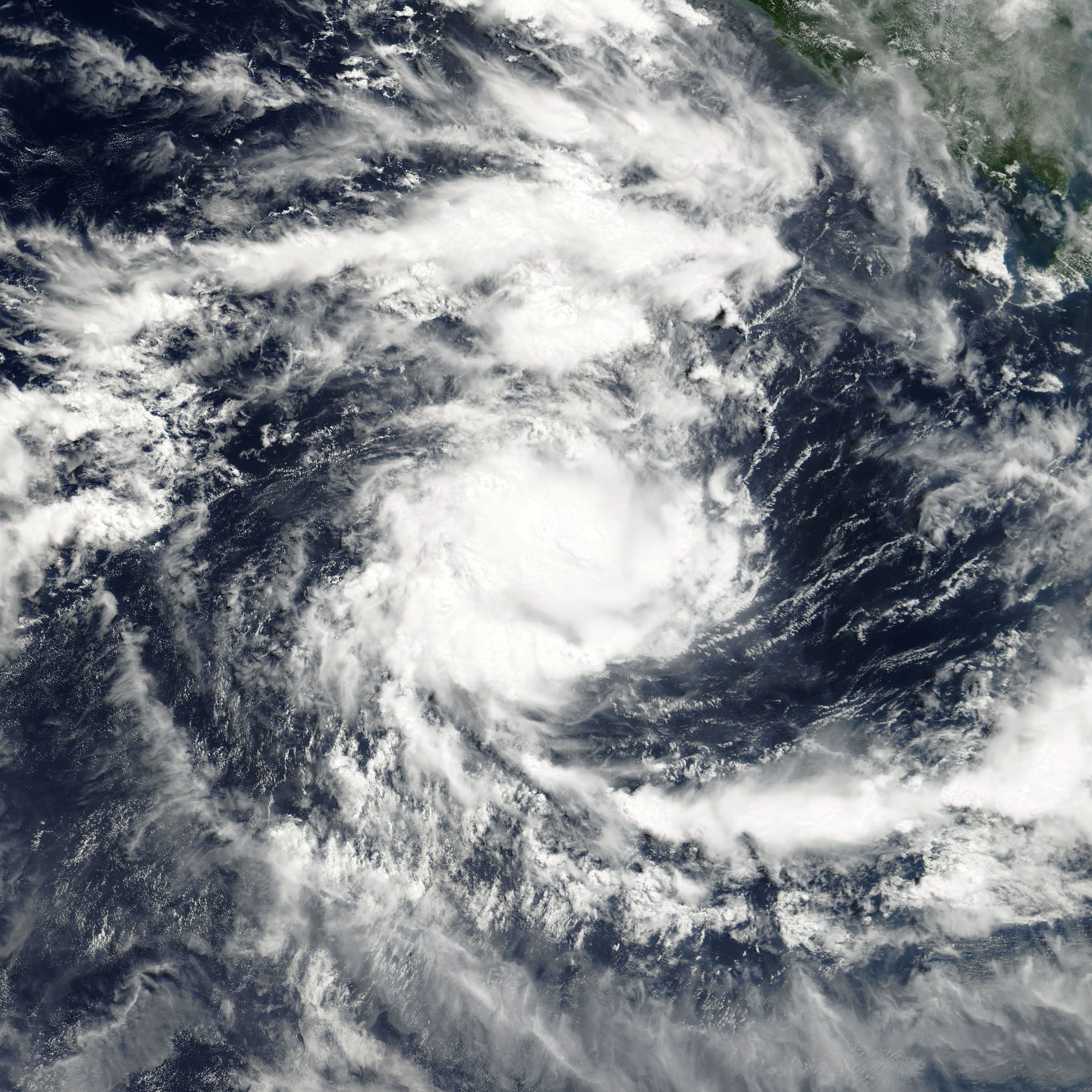
Cyclone Walter

The factors that begin to inhibit Southern Hemisphere cyclone formation in March are even more pronounced in April, with the average number of storms formed being hardly half that of March. However, even this limited activity exceeds the activity in the Northern Hemisphere, which is rare, with the exception of the Western Pacific basin. All Pacific typhoon seasons between 1998 and 2016 saw activity between January and April, although many of these seasons saw only weak tropical depressions. By contrast, only two Atlantic hurricane seasons during those years saw tropical cyclone formation during that period. With the combination of the decreasing temperatures in the Southern Hemisphere and the still-low temperatures in the Northern Hemisphere, April and May tend to be the least active months worldwide for tropical cyclone formation.
April was a near-average month, with six storms forming, four getting named, all in the southern hemisphere. Although another system, 02W (Barok), received a name that is deemed unofficial outside of the Philippines. In the Australian basin, Walter and Alistair formed, with the former being the strongest storm this month. Walter impacted the Cocos Islands, while Alistair impacted Australia. The Southwest Indian Ocean featured Tropical Storm Evariste, which struck St. Brandon and Rodrigues. Ιn the southern pacific, Cyclone Sose impacted a handful of nations within six days, although damage was mostly minor.

Tropical cyclones formed in April 2001
Storm name	Dates active	Max wind km/h (mph)	Pressure (hPa)	Areas affected	Damage (USD)	Deaths	Refs
Walter	April 1 – 8	150 (90)	940	Cocos Islands	None	None	
Evariste	April 2 – 8	110 (70)	973	St. Brandon, Rodrigues	None	None	
10	April 2 – 5	65 (40)	998	None	None	None	
Sose	April 5 – 11	110 (70)	975	Vanuatu, New Caledonia, New Zealand, Australia, Tonga, Samoa	Minor	9	
Alistair	April 15 – 23	110 (70)	975	Western Australia, New Guinea, Northern Territory	None	None	
02W (Barok)	April 16 – 18	45 (30)	1004	Philippines	None	None	

=== May ===
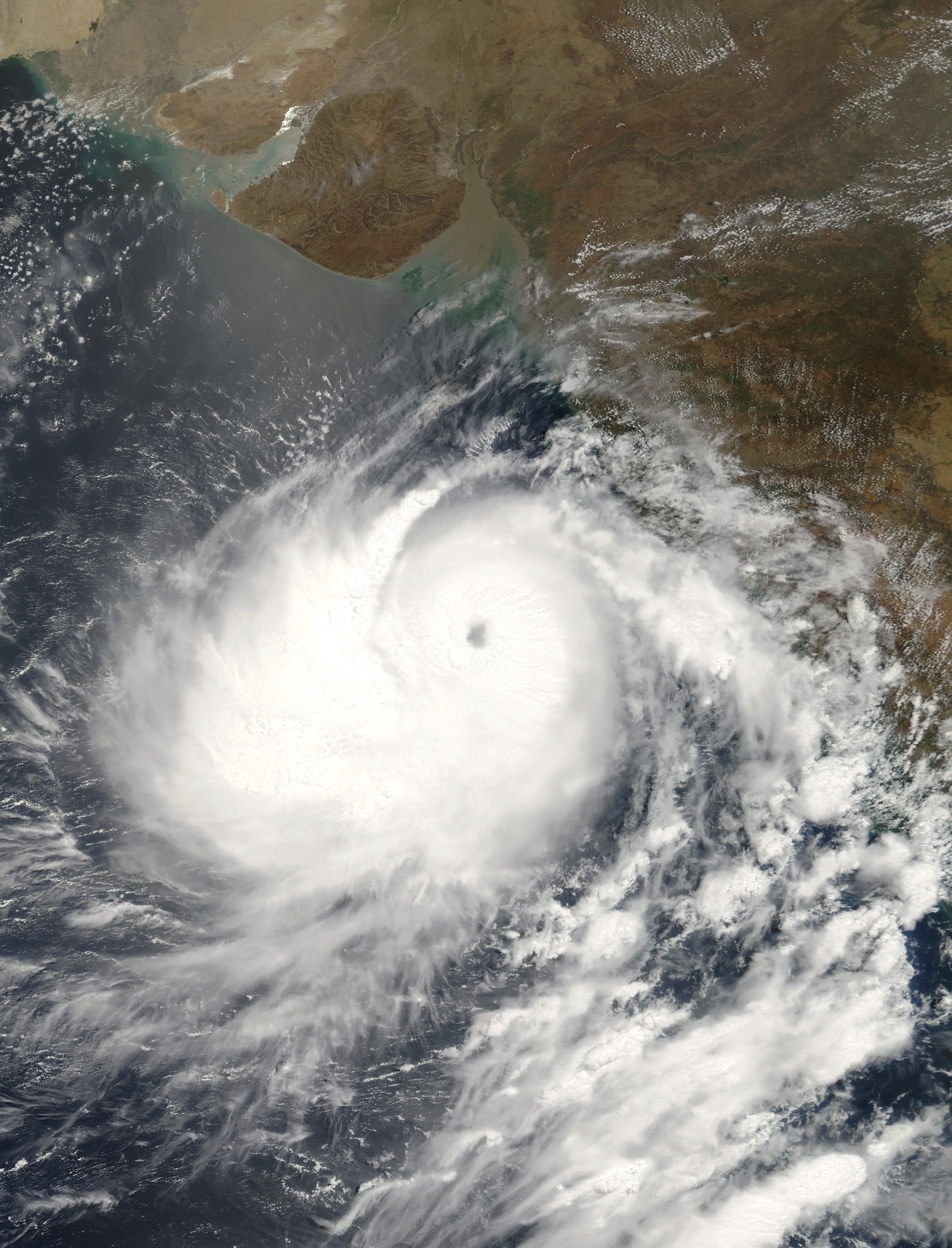
2001 Gujarat cyclone

Around the middle of May, the Intertropical Convergence Zone (ITCZ), which allows for the formation of tropical waves and has previously remained in the Southern Hemisphere for the first five months of the year, moves to the Northern Hemisphere, allowing the northern cyclone seasons to start in earnest. Without the presence of the ITCZ, Southern Hemisphere cyclones must form from non-wave sources, which are rarer. For that reason, cyclone formation is relatively sparse, with May tending to be the month of the final storm in each of the three basins. Meanwhile, more intense storms are nearly unheard of, with the South-West Indian Ocean having seen only one intense tropical cyclone and no very intense tropical cyclones in the month, and the other two basins having similar levels of activity in May. In the Northern Hemisphere, May is the first month most basins see activity, due to the new presence of the ITCZ. The Pacific hurricane season begins on May 15, and although the Atlantic hurricane season officially begins on June 1, off-season storms are very common, with over half of the 21st century seasons seeing a storm form in May. Although the North Indian Ocean has no official start or end date, due to the monsoon, mid-May is the beginning of a month-long period of high activity in the basin. Even in the Western Pacific, activity tends to increase throughout May.
May saw six storms form, and two getting named, both in the Pacific, making May an inactive month. In the Eastern Pacific, Hurricane Adolph formed, which was one of two Category 4 hurricanes in the basin in May. Adolph briefly threatened Mexico before moving away. In the Western Pacific, Tropical Storm Cimaron (or Tropical Storm Crising) formed, which caused minor damage in the Philippines and Taiwan. Another notable storm was the 2001 Gujarat cyclone in the North Indian Ocean, which killed at least 120 people in western India.

Tropical cyclones formed in May 2001
Storm name	Dates active	Max wind km/h (mph)	Pressure (hPa)	Areas affected	Damage (USD)	Deaths	Refs
14F	May 1–3	75 (45)	1004	None	None	None	
TD	May 6–7	Not specified	Not specified	None	None	None	
15F	May 7–9	Not specified	Not specified	None	None	None	
Cimaron (Crising)	May 9–14	95 (60)	985	Philippines, Taiwan	$555 thousand	None	
ARB 01	May 21 – 28	215 (130)	932	Western India	Minimal	> 120	(Note: Between 120 and 900 fishermen were listed as missing after contact was lost with their vessels during the storm.)
Adolph	May 25 – June 1	230 (145)	940	Mexico	None	None	

=== June ===
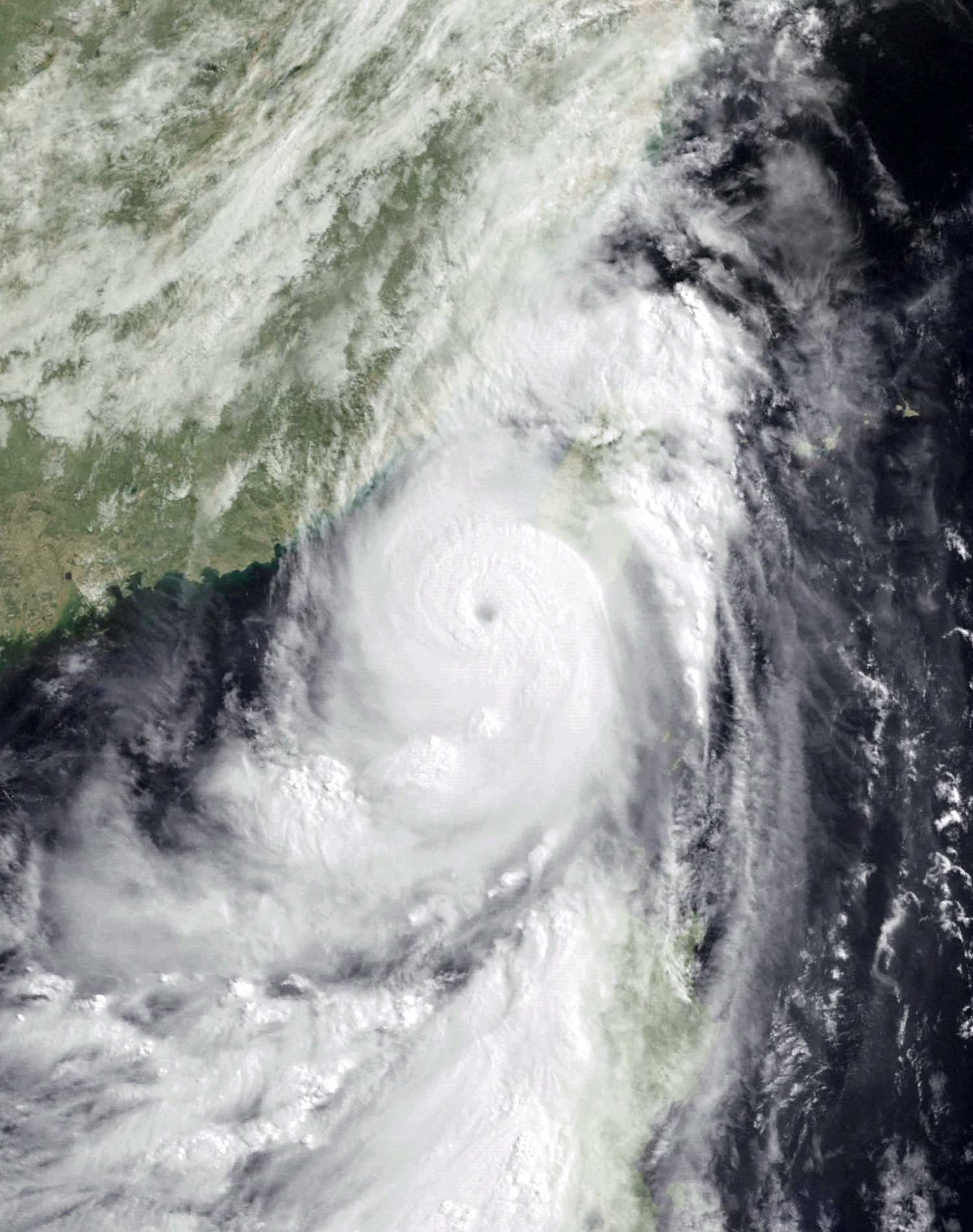
Typhoon Chebi

Tropical cyclones formed in June 2001
Storm name	Dates active	Max wind km/h (mph)	Pressure (hPa)	Areas affected	Damage (USD)	Deaths	Refs
Allison	June 4–20	95 (60)	1000	Gulf Coast of the United States, East Coast of the United States	$9 billion	55	
BOB 01	June 11–13	45 (30)	990	East India	Minimal	Unknown	
Darna	June 17–19	55 (35)	1000	Philippines, Taiwan	Unknown	None	
Chebi (Emong)	June 19–24	120 (75)	965	Philippines, Taiwan, China	$471 million	108	
Barbara	June 20–26	95 (60)	997	Hawaii	None	None	
11	June 20–24	95 (60)	995	Mozambique	None	None	
Durian	June 29 – July 2	110 (70)	970	China, Vietnam	$422 million	110	

=== July ===
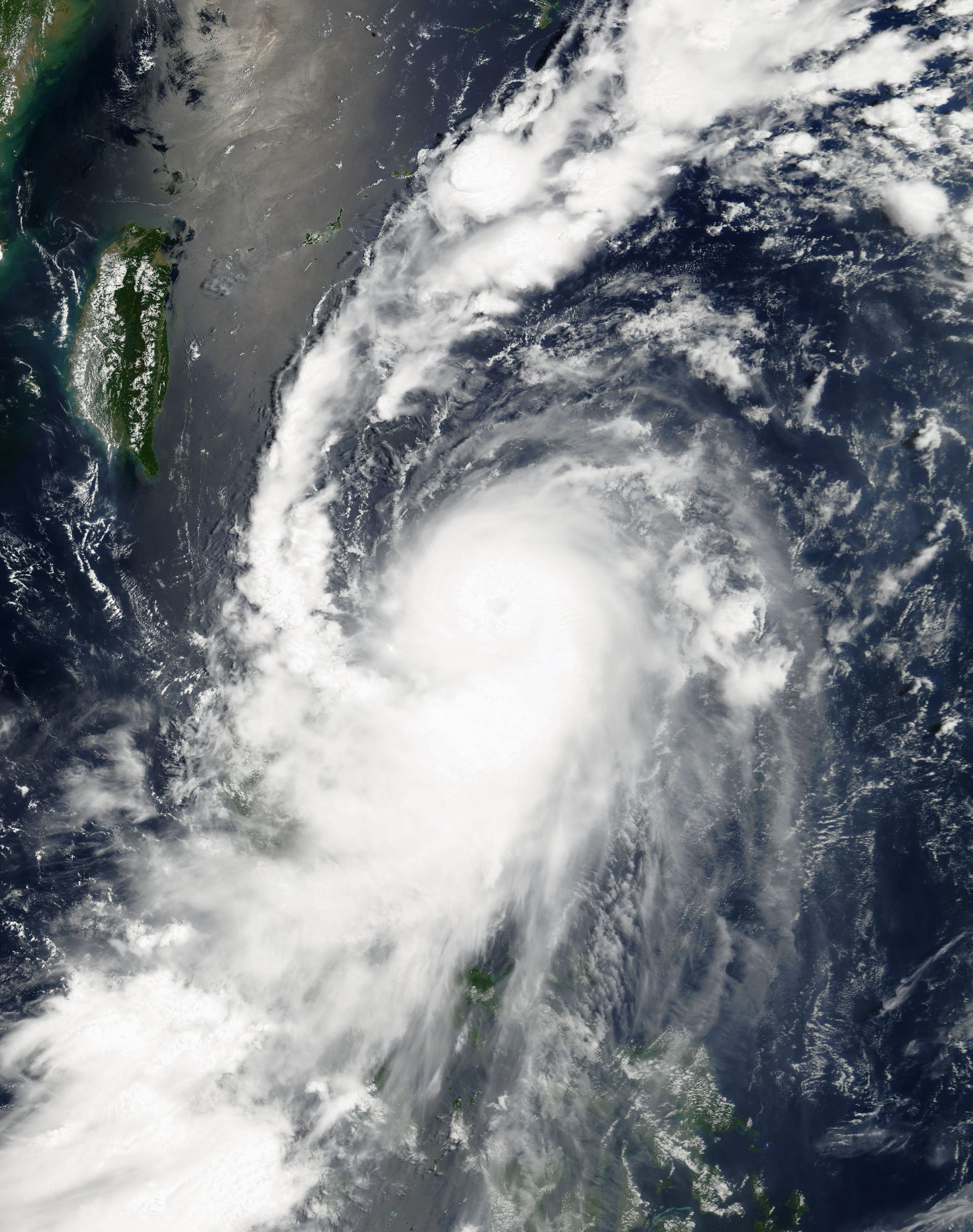
Typhoon Toraji

Tropical cyclones formed in July 2001
Storm name	Dates active	Max wind km/h (mph)	Pressure (hPa)	Areas affected	Damage (USD)	Deaths	Refs
Utor (Feria)	July 1–7	110 (70)	960	Philippines, Taiwan, China	$332 million	197	
Trami (Gorio)	July 8–11	75 (45)	994	Philippines, Taiwan, China	Unknown	3	
08W	July 10–11	45 (30)	1002	None	None	None	
Two	July 11–12	45 (30)	1010	None	None	None	
Cosme	July 13–15	75 (45)	1000	None	None	None	
TD	July 16–19	55 (35)	1004	None	None	None	
Erick	July 20–24	65 (40)	1001	None	None	None	
Dalila	July 21–28	120 (75)	987	Mexico, Baja California Peninsula	$1 million	1	
Kong-rey	July 21–28	130 (80)	955	None	None	None	
Yutu (Huaning)	July 22–26	100 (65)	975	Philippines, Taiwan, China, Vietnam	$75.5 million	Unknown	
Toraji (Isang)	July 25 – August 1	140 (85)	960	Philippines, Taiwan, China	$245 million	200	

=== August ===
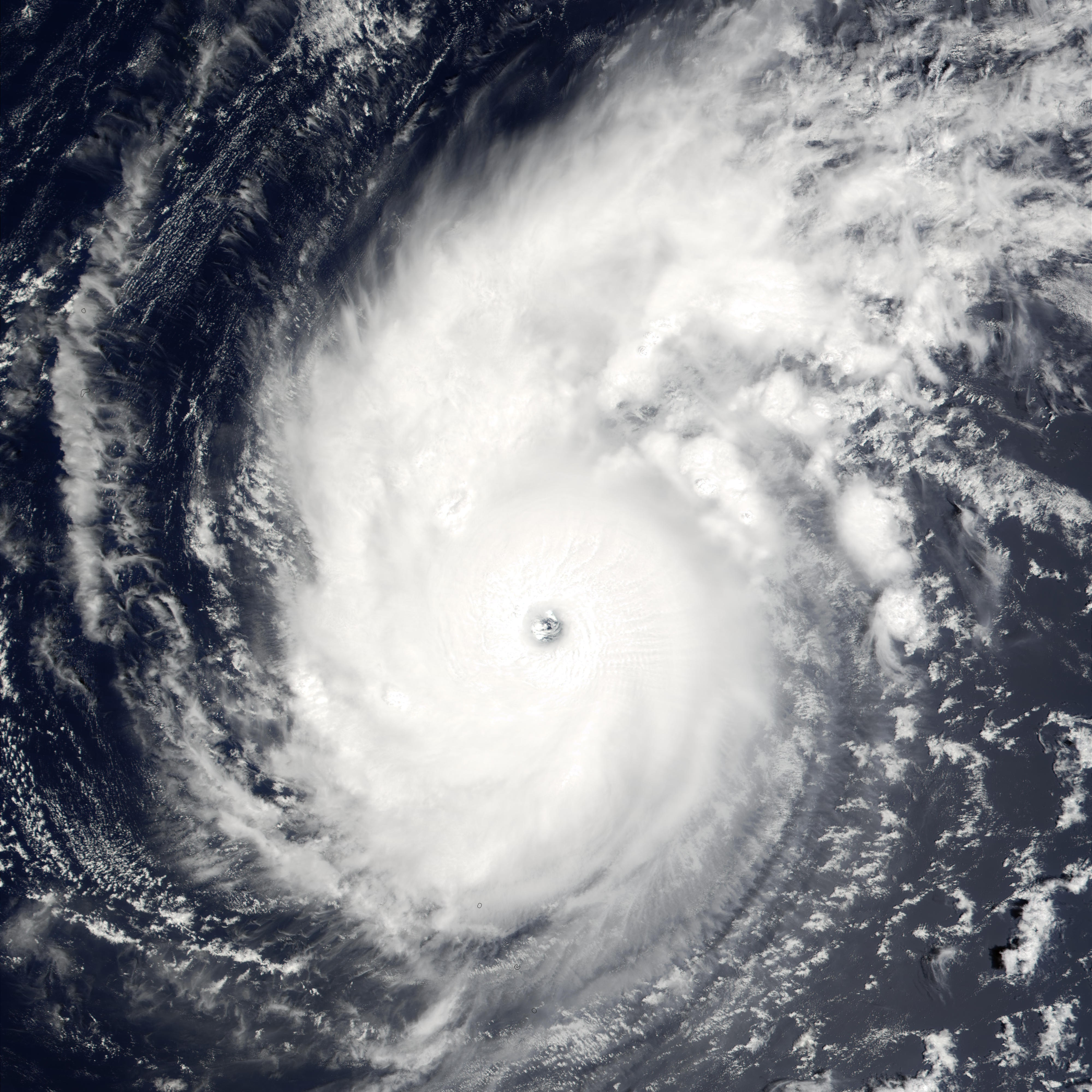
Typhoon Wutip

Tropical cyclones formed in August 2001
Storm name	Dates active	Max wind km/h (mph)	Pressure (hPa)	Areas affected	Damage (USD)	Deaths	Refs
Man-yi	August 1 – 9	150 (90)	955	Mariana Islands, Palau	$50 thousand	None	
Barry	August 2–7	110 (70	990	Cuba, Florida, Alabama, Mississippi, Georgia, Arkansas, Missouri, Tennessee	$30 million	9	
TD	August 2–3	Not specified	1004	Taiwan, Ryukyu Islands	None	None	
TD	August 5–8	Not specified	1000	China, Korea	None	None	
Usagi	August 8–11	65 (40)	992	China, Vietnam, Laos, Thailand	$3.2 million	176	
Pabuk	August 13–22	130 (80)	960	Japan, Mariana Islands	$7.1 million	6	
Chantal	August 14–22	110 (70)	997	Windward Islands, Jamaica, Belize, Mexico	$4 million	2	
Jolina	August 16–19	55 (35)	998	Philippines	$9.1 million	41	
Dean	August 22–28	110 (70)	994	Lesser Antilles, Virgin Islands, Puerto Rico, Bahamas, Bermuda, Canada	$7.7 million	None	
Six-E	August 22–28	55 (35)	1007	None	None	None	
TD	August 22–24	Not specified	1000	None	None	None	
TD	August 22–23	Not specified	1002	None	None	None	
15W	August 24–28	55 (35)	1000	None	None	None	
Flossie	August 26 – September 2	165 (105)	972	Baja California Sur, California	$35 thousand	2	
Wutip	August 26 – September 2	165 (105)	930	None	None	None	
Sepat	August 26–30	85 (50)	990	None	None	None	
Fitow	August 28 – September 1	65 (40)	990	China	$202 million	4	

=== September ===
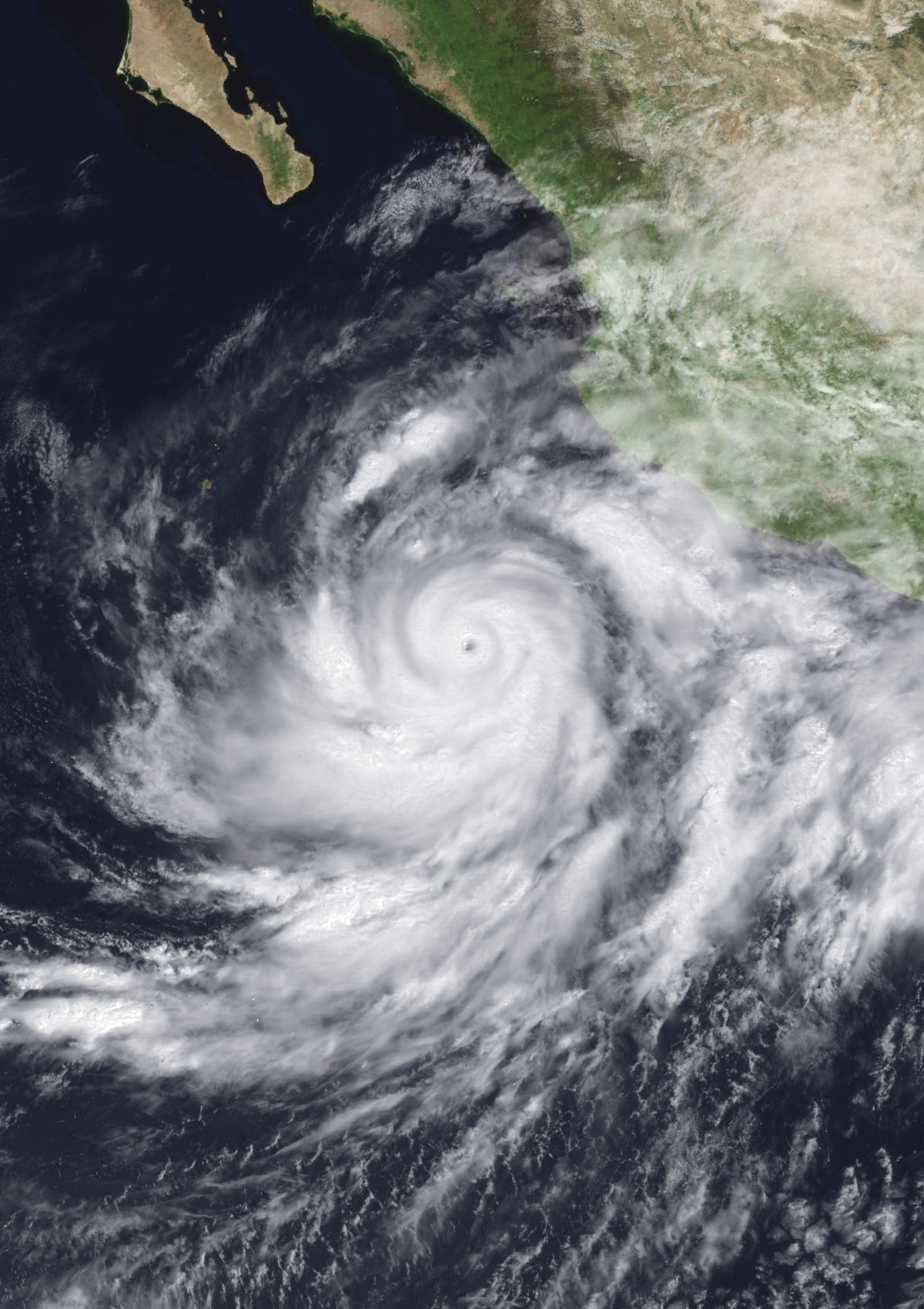
Hurricane Juliette

Tropical cyclones formed in September 2001
Storm name	Dates active	Max wind km/h (mph)	Pressure (hPa)	Areas affected	Damage (USD)	Deaths	Refs
Erin	September 1–17	195 (120)	968	Bermuda, East Coast of the United States, Atlantic Canada, Greenland	Minimal	None	
Danas	September 3–14	155 (100)	945	Japan	$12.8 million	8	
Gil	September 4–10	155 (100)	975	None	None	None	
Henriette	September 4–8	100 (65)	994	None	None	None	
Nari (Kiko)	September 5–21	140 (85)	960	Ryukyu Islands, Taiwan, China	$443 million	94-114	(Note: The total deaths are unknown.)
TD	September 5–7	Not specified	1002	China	None	None	
Felix	September 7–19	185 (115)	962	None	None	None	
TD	September 8–10	Not specified	1000	Taiwan, Ryukyu Islands	None	None	
TD	September 9–12	Not specified	1000	China, Vietnam	None	None	
Ivo	September 10–14	85 (50)	997	Mexico, Baja California Peninsula	None	None	
Gabrielle	September 11–19	130 (80)	975	Florida, Newfoundland	> $230 million	3	
One-C	September 11–11	55 (35)	1005	None	None	None	
Vipa	September 17–21	120 (75)	975	Japan	None	None	
Francisco	September 18–25	155 (100)	945	Mariana Islands	None	None	
Nine	September 19–20	55 (35)	1005	Central America	None	None	
Humberto	September 21–27	165 (105)	970	Bermuda	None	None	
Juliette	September 21 – October 3	230 (145)	923	Baja California Peninsula, Mexico, California, Arizona	$400 million	12	
Kiko	September 21–25	120 (75)	990	None	None	None	
Lekima (Labuyo)	September 22–30	130 (80)	965	Philippines, Taiwan, China	Unknown	2	
Two-C	September 23–25	65 (40)	1008	None	None	None	
ARB 02	September 25–28	65 (40)	1000	None	None	None	

=== October ===
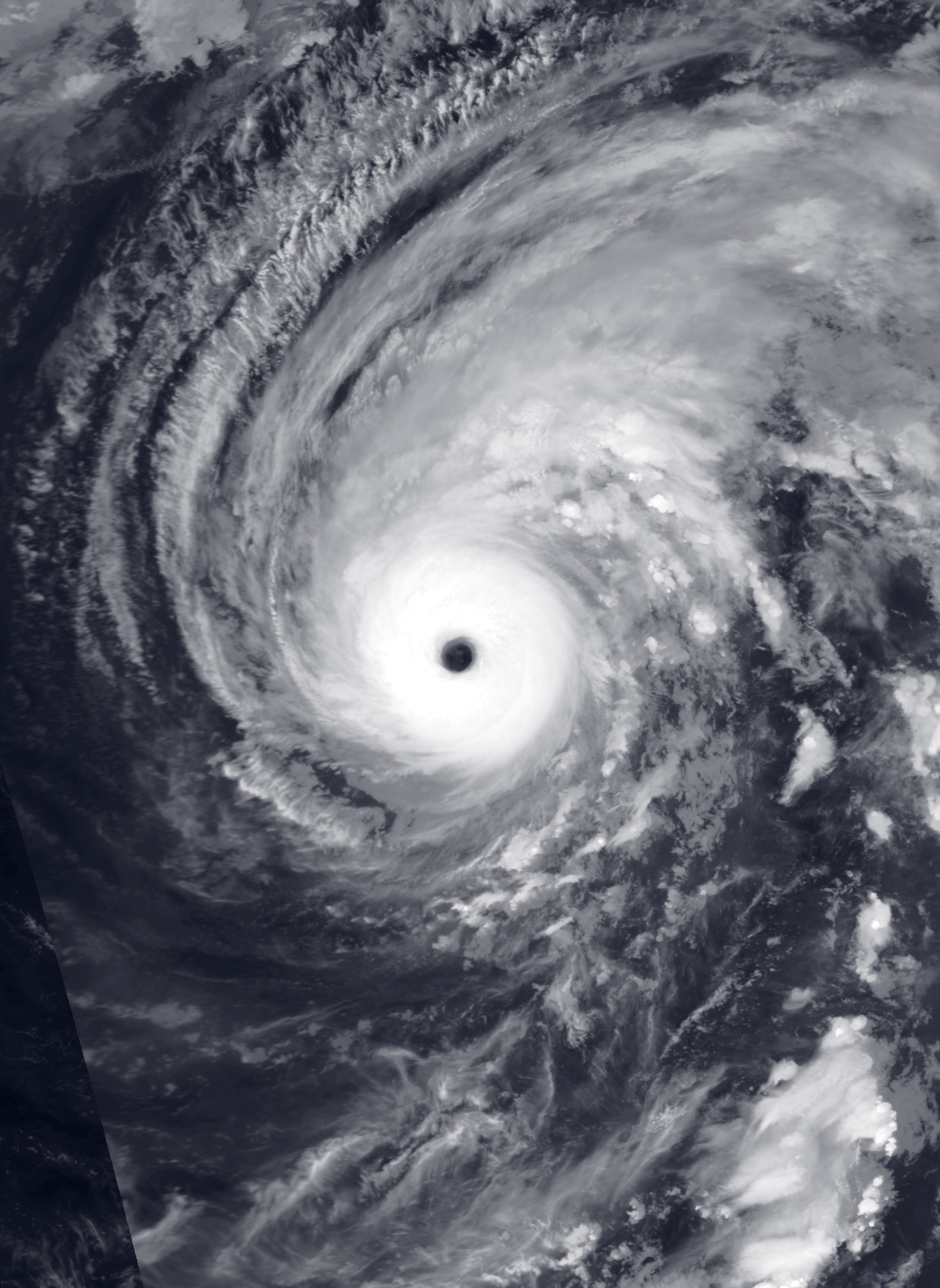
Typhoon Podul

Tropical cyclones formed in October 2001
Storm name	Dates active	Max wind km/h (mph)	Pressure (hPa)	Areas affected	Damage (USD)	Deaths	Refs
Lorena	October 2–4	95 (60)	997	Mexico	Minimal	None	
Fourteen-E	October 3–4	55 (35)	1008	None	None	None	
Krosa	October 3–9	150 (90)	950	Micronesia	None	None	
01	October 3–7	55 (35)	998	None	None	None	
Iris	October 4–9	230 (145)	948	Windward Islands, Hispaniola, Jamaica, Honduras, Belize, Guatemala, Mexico	$250 million	36	
Jerry	October 6–8	85 (50)	1004	Barbados, Windward Islands, Lesser Antilles	None	None	
ARB 03	October 7–13	65 (40)	998	Western India	None	None	
Manuel	October 10–18	95 (60)	997	None	None	None	
Haiyan (Maring)	October 11–18	130 (80)	960	Taiwan, Ryukyu Islands	$3.4 million	2	
Karen	October 12–15	130 (80)	982	Bermuda, Atlantic Canada	$1.4 million	None	
BOB 02	October 14–17	65 (40)	998	South India	$104 million	153	
Podul	October 19–27	185 (115)	925	None	None	None	
Narda	October 20–25	140 (85)	980	None	None	None	
TD	October 20–21	Not specified	1002	Vietnam	None	None	
Alex	October 26 – October 28	95 (60)	984	None	None	None	(Note: Originated from the Australian region.)
Lorenzo	October 27–31	65 (40)	1007	None	None	None	
Andre	October 28 – November 8	95 (60)	985	None	None	None	(Note: Alex from the Australian basin crossed to the South-West Indian Ocean basin, renaming it Andre.)
Michelle	October 29 – November 6	220 (140)	933	Jamaica, Costa Rica, Nicaragua, Honduras, Cayman Islands, Cuba, Florida, The Bahamas, Turks and Caicos Islands, Bermuda	$2.43 billion	48	
Octave	October 31 – November 3	140 (85)	980	None	None	None	

=== November ===
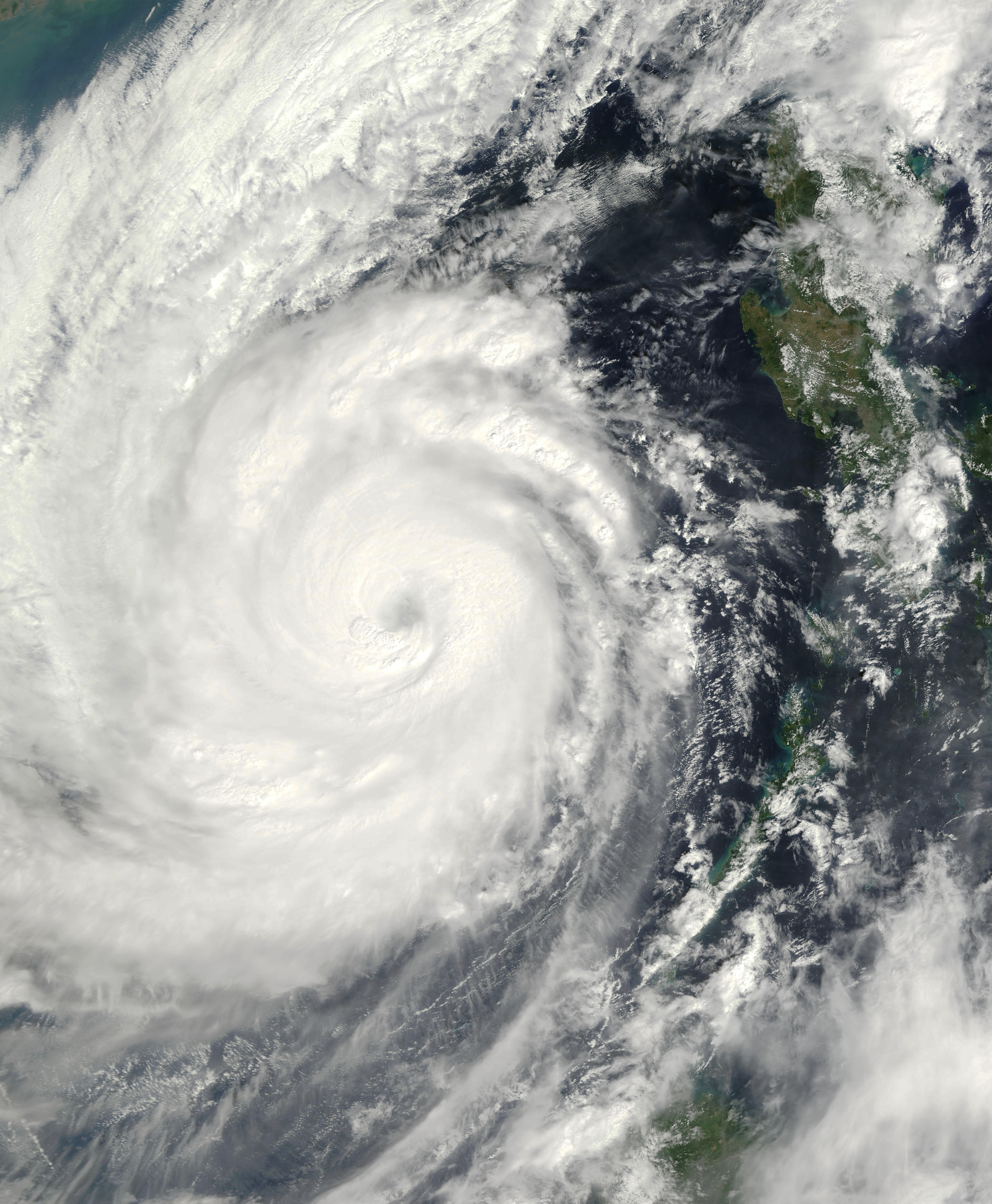
Typhoon Lingling

Tropical cyclones formed in November 2001
Storm name	Dates active	Max wind km/h (mph)	Pressure (hPa)	Areas affected	Damage (USD)	Deaths	Refs
Noel	November 4–6	120 (75)	986	None	None	None	
Lingling (Nanang)	November 6–12	155 (100)	940	Philippines, Vietnam, Cambodia	$70.3 million	379	
TL	November 7–13	55 (35)	998	None	None	None	
BOB 03	November 11–12	45 (30)	1004	East India	Minimal	None	
03	November 15–23	55 (35)	998	None	None	None	
28W (Ondoy)	November 17–25	55 (35)	996	Caroline Islands, Mariana Islands, Philippines	None	None	
03S	November 17–22	65 (40)	997	Indonesia, Queensland	Unknown	None	
29W (Pabling)	November 18–24	55 (35)	1004	Philippines, Malaysia, Brunei, Indonesia	None	None	
Olga	November 24 – December 7	150 (90)	973	Bermuda, Bahamas, Florida, Cuba	None	None	
Bessi	November 26–30	100 (65)	980	None	None	None	(Note: Originated from the Australian basin.)
Trina	November 29 – December 3	65 (40)	995	Cook Islands	$52 thousand	None	
Bako	November 30 – December 5	120 (75)	968	None	None	None	(Note: Bessi crossed to the South-West Indian Ocean basin from the Australian region, renaming it Bako.)

=== December ===
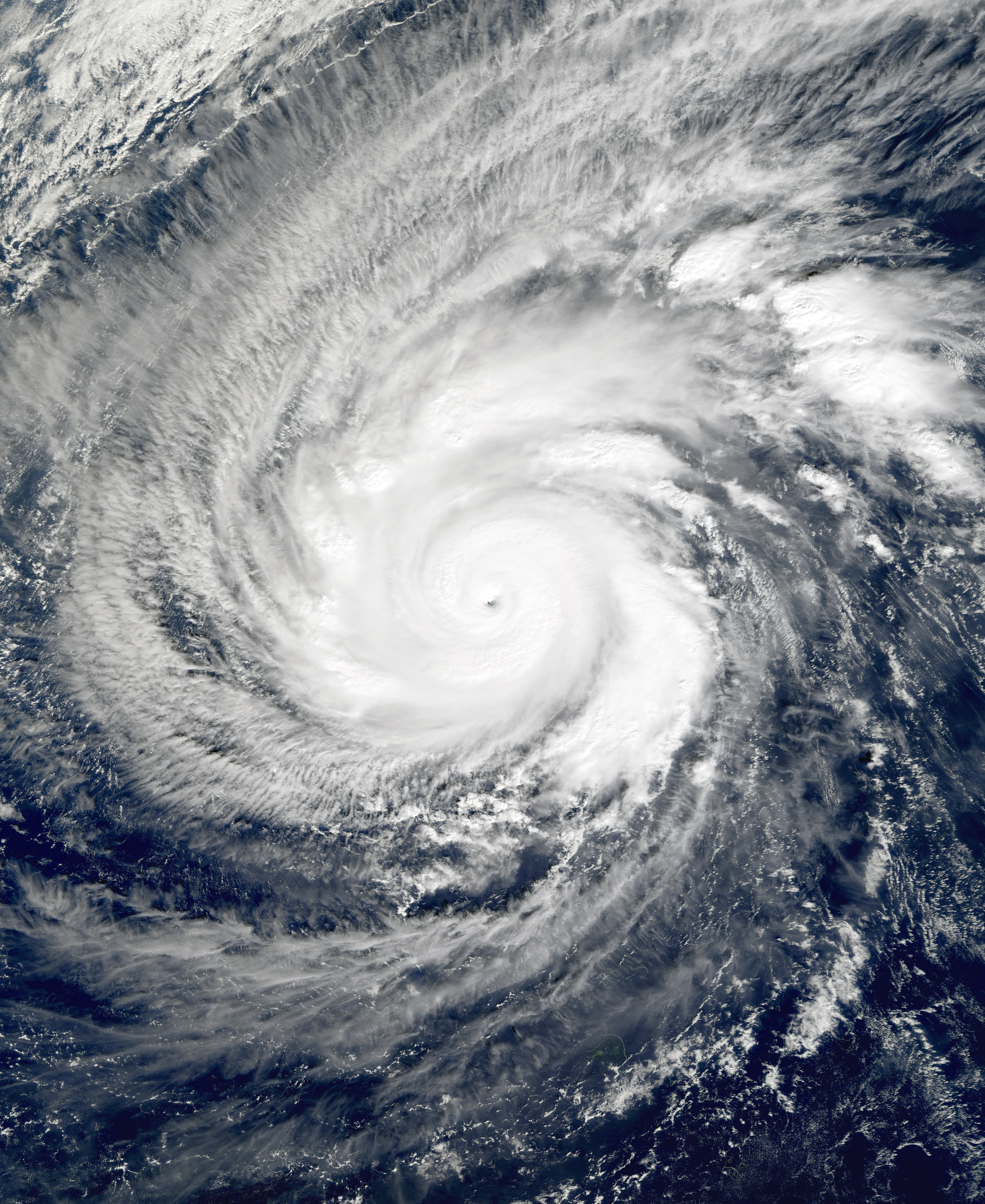
Typhoon Faxai

Tropical cyclones formed in December 2001
Storm name	Dates active	Max wind km/h (mph)	Pressure (hPa)	Areas affected	Damage (USD)	Deaths	Refs
Kajiki (Quedan)	December 4–9	65 (40)	996	Philippines, Vietnam	Minimal	None	
02F	December 8–10	45 (30)	1000	Fiji	None	None	
31W	December 10–12	65 (40)	997	Caroline Islands	None	None	
Faxai	December 13–25	195 (120)	915	Caroline Islands, Mariana Islands	$1 million	2	
Waka	December 19 – January 2	185 (115)	930	Wallis and Futuna, Niue, Tonga, New Zealand	$51.4 million	1	
Vicky	December 22–26	65 (40)	996	None	None	None	
Vamei	December 26 – January 1	85 (50)	1006	Singapore, Malaysia, Indonesia	$3.6 million	5	
Cyprien	December 30 – January 3	100 (65)	980	Mozambique, Madagascar	$181 thousand	None	
Bernie	December 30 – January 6	95 (60)	980	Northern Territory	None	None	
05F	December 31 – January 6	65 (40)	998	Solomon Islands, Vanuatu	None	None	

== Global effects ==
There are a total of seven tropical cyclone basins that tropical cyclones typically form in this table, data from all these basins are added.

Season name		Areas affected	Systems formed	Named storms	Hurricane-force tropical cyclones	Damage (1995 USD)	Deaths	Ref.
North Atlantic Ocean (Note: The wind speeds for this tropical cyclone/basin are based on the Saffir Simpson Scale which uses 1-minute sustained winds.)		Gulf Coast of the United States, East Coast of the United States, Atlantic Canada, Greater Antilles, Windward Islands, Yucatan Peninsula, Central America, Lesser Antilles, Lucayan Archipelago, Eastern Canada, Bermuda	17	15	9	$11.45 billion	153	
Eastern and Central Pacific Ocean		Hawaiian Islands, Baja California Peninsula, Southwestern Mexico, Northern Mexico, Southwestern United States	19	15	8	$402.35 million	16	
Western Pacific Ocean (Note: Only systems that formed either before or on December 31, 2001 are counted in the seasonal totals.)		Marshall Islands, Caroline Islands, Ryukyu Islands, South China, Philippines, Taiwan, Vietnam, Korean Peninsula, Laos, Thailand, Mariana Islands, Japan, Cambodia	47	26	20	$2.42 billion	1,714	
North Indian Ocean (Note: The wind speeds for this tropical cyclone/basin are based on the IMD Scale which uses 3-minute sustained winds.)		South India, Andhra Pradesh, Myanmar, West Bengal, East India, Bangladesh, Nepal, Oman, Yemen, Somalia, Sumatra	6	4	1	Unknown	900	
South-West Indian Ocean	January – June (Note: Only systems that formed either on or after January 1, 2001 are counted in the seasonal totals.) (Note: The wind speeds for this tropical cyclone are based on Météo-France, which uses wind gusts.)	Seychelles, Agaléga, Tromelin, Mauritius, Réunion, Rodrigues, Comoros, Mayotte, Madagascar, Europa Island, South Africa	7	6	6	Unknown	4	
South-West Indian Ocean	July – December	—N/a	2	—N/a	—N/a	Unknown	—N/a	
Australian region	January – June	Western Australia, Christmas Island, Cocos (Keeling) Islands	11	7	2	$12.8 million	2	
Australian region	July – December	Christmas Island, Western Australia	4	2	1	Unknown	—N/a	
South Pacific Ocean	January – June	Fiji, Vanuatu, New Caledonia, New Zealand, Tonga, Samoa, Solomon Islands,	7	4	2	$1.39 million	6	
South Pacific Ocean	July – December	Rarotonga, Mangaia, Wallis and Futuna, Niue, Tonga, Vava'u, New Zealand	4	3	1	$51.4 million	1	
Worldwide		(See above)	124 (Note: The sum of the number of systems in each basin will not equal the number shown as the total. This is because when systems move between basins, it creates a discrepancy in the actual number of systems.)	82	50	$11.9 billion	2,796	

== See also ==
- Tropical cyclones by year
- List of earthquakes in 2001
- Tornadoes of 2001
