= Tropical Storm Faxai (2007) =

Pacific severe tropical storm in 2007

Severe Tropical Storm Faxai (Juaning)
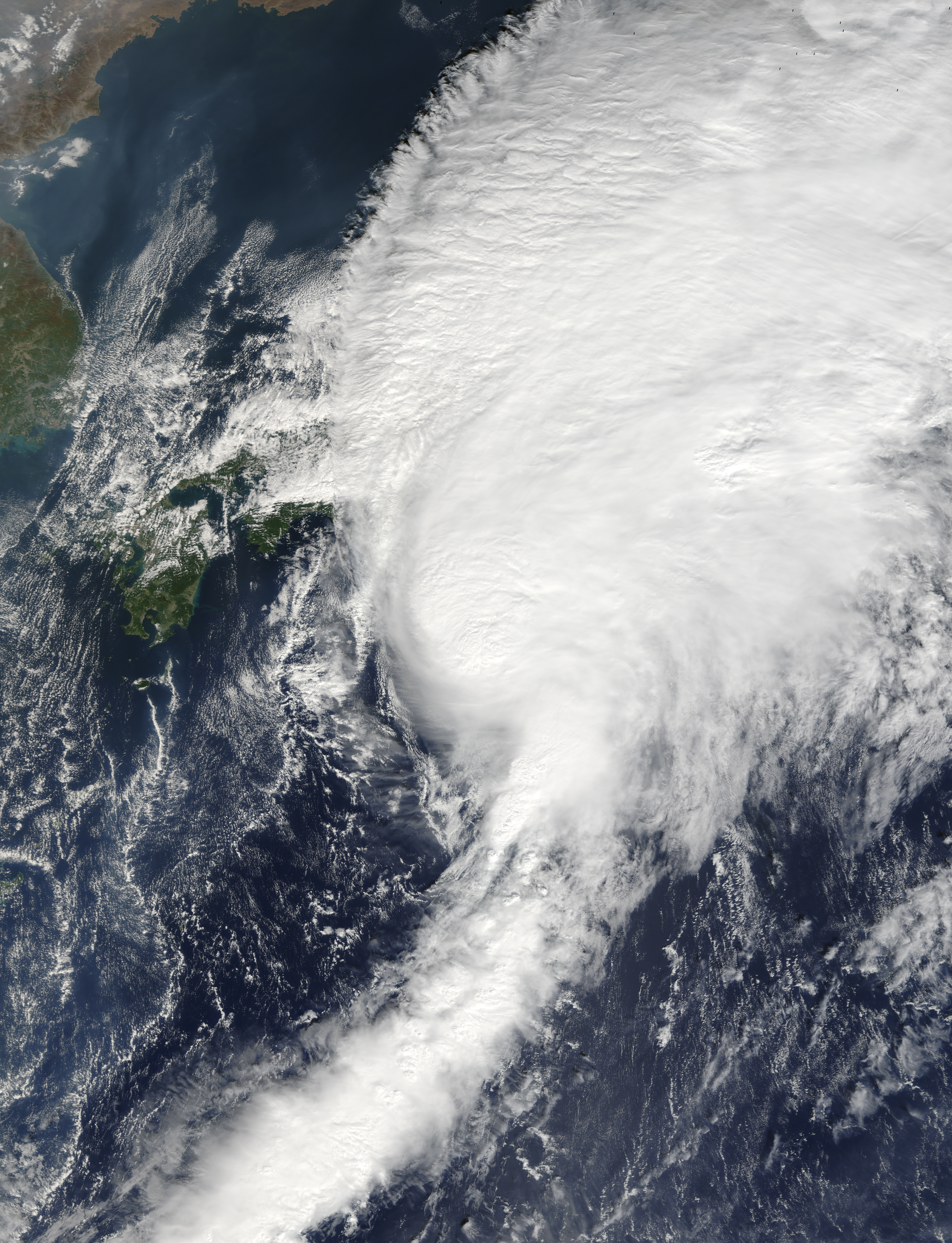
- Severe Tropical Storm Faxai at peak intensity on October 27

Meteorological history
- Formed: October 25, 2007
- Extratropical: October 27, 2007
- Dissipated: October 29, 2007

Severe tropical storm
- 10-minute sustained (JMA)
- Highest winds: 100 km/h (65 mph)
- Lowest pressure: 975 hPa (mbar); 28.79 inHg

Tropical storm
- 1-minute sustained (SSHWS/JTWC)
- Highest winds: 75 km/h (45 mph)
- Lowest pressure: 993 hPa (mbar); 29.32 inHg

Overall effects
- Fatalities: 1 direct
- Injuries: 9
- Damage: $1.5 million (2007 USD)
- Areas affected: Japan
- IBTrACS
- Part of the 2007 Pacific typhoon season

Severe Tropical Storm Faxai, (Note: The name Faxai (Lao: ຟ້າໃສ, [faː˥˨ saj˩]) was contributed by Laos and is a feminine given name meaning "clear skies" in Lao.) known in the Philippines as Tropical Storm Juaning, was a short-lived tropical storm that had minor effects on land in late October 2007. The twentieth named storm of the 2007 Pacific typhoon season, Faxai originated from a tropical depression over the open waters of the western Pacific Ocean in late October. The storm quickly strengthened, becoming a severe tropical storm on October 26 as it rapidly traveled toward the northeast. The storm became extratropical the following day as it brushed Japan. The remnants dissipated on October 28.

Although Faxai never made landfall, outer bands associated with the storm produced torrential rains, amounting to 458 mm (18.0 in) on Miyakejima. A Japan Airlines flight to Narita Airport encountered severe turbulence during the afternoon of October 27. One person sustained serious injuries, and five others received minor injuries; the plane was damaged during the event. One person was killed near Tokyo as the storm passed by, and three others were injured. Damages from the storm amounted to ¥150 million (US$1.5 million).

== Meteorological history ==
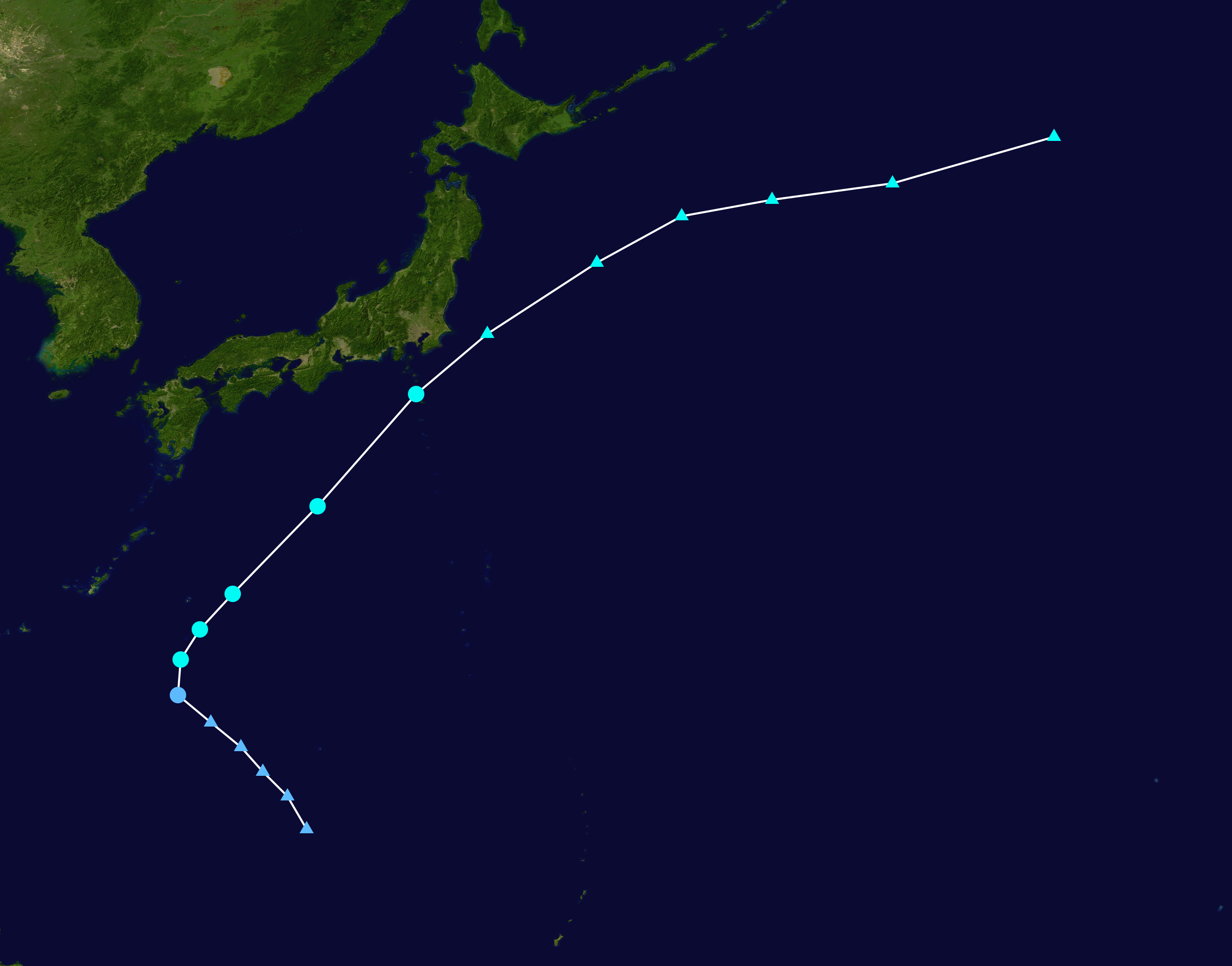
Map plotting the storm's track and intensity, according to the Saffir–Simpson scale Map key Saffir–Simpson scale Tropical depression (≤38 mph, ≤62 km/h) Tropical storm (39–73 mph, 63–118 km/h) Category 1 (74–95 mph, 119–153 km/h) Category 2 (96–110 mph, 154–177 km/h) Category 3 (111–129 mph, 178–208 km/h) Category 4 (130–156 mph, 209–251 km/h) Category 5 (≥157 mph, ≥252 km/h) Unknown Storm type Tropical cyclone Subtropical cyclone Extratropical cyclone, remnant low, tropical disturbance, or monsoon depression

Tropical Storm Faxai began as an area of convection that persisted about 805 kilometers (500 mi) west of Guam on October 24. Satellite imagery indicated broad cyclonic turning in the lower levels of the atmosphere, and a trough was near the surface. Convection consolidated around the center of the low-level circulation, and the upper-level environment—low wind shear and good divergence—favored development. The following day, the Japan Meteorological Agency (JMA) classified the system as a tropical depression. Shortly after, the Joint Typhoon Warning Center (JTWC) issued a Tropical Cyclone Formation Alert as convection deepened around a partially exposed low. The storm traveled northwest under the influences of a subtropical ridge to the north. At 0000 UTC on October 26, the Philippine Atmospheric, Geophysical and Astronomical Services Administration (PAGASA) designated the system as a tropical depression and gave it the local name Juaning. Around the same time, the JMA upgraded the depression to a tropical storm and gave it the name Faxai.

The JTWC issued advisories on Faxai, designating it as 20W; however, they classified it as a tropical depression. Several hours later, the storm began to undergo an extratropical transition, with convection persisting mainly in the northwestern portion of the storm and cold, dry air entering into the southwestern portion. At 1200 UTC, PAGASA issued their final advisory on Tropical Storm Juaning as it moved out of their area of responsibility. The JTWC reported that Tropical Depression 20W (Faxai) had become extratropical around this time as it merged with a baroclinic zone. A cold front developed along the southern portion of Faxai, a feature of extratropical cyclones. Around that time, the JMA upgraded Faxai to a severe tropical storm with (10-minute sustained) winds of 95 km/h (59 mph).

The JTWC subsequently upgraded the depression to a tropical storm based on the development of a very impactful central dense overcast. A shortwave trough over the Korean Peninsula provided a favorable upper-level environment for Faxai to intensify. Early the next day, Faxai began accelerating rapidly towards the northeast in the mid-latitude westerlies. An anticyclone over Japan created a strong pressure gradient between it and the tropical storm, causing the wind field of Faxai to expand significantly to the northeast. As the JTWC issued their final advisory, they assessed the storm to have reached its peak intensity, with (one-minute sustained) winds of 75 km/h (47 mph). The JMA also assessed Faxai to have reached its peak intensity at that time, with (10-minute sustained) winds of 100 km/h (62 mph) and a minimum pressure of 975 hPa (mbar); however, the National Oceanic and Atmospheric Administration (NOAA) reported that Faxai had attained hurricane-force winds by this time, peaking at 130 km/h (81 mph). The storm continued towards the northeast at a rapid pace and became extratropical off the eastern coast of Honshu around 1200 UTC on October 27. The extratropical remnants persisted for more than a day before dissipating over open waters late on October 28. NOAA, on the other hand, continued to monitor the remnants of Faxai, with the system reaching the Aleutian Islands on October 29. The following day, the storm rapidly intensified, with the central pressure dropping to 957 hPa (mbar) by 1800 UTC. On October 31, the system tracked into Alaska and weakened.

The Japan Meteorological Agency uses 10-minute sustained winds, while the Joint Typhoon Warning Center uses one-minute sustained winds. The conversion factor between the two is 1.14. JMA's peak intensity for Faxai was 100 km/h (65 mph) 10-minute sustained, or 120 km/h (75 mph) one-minute sustained. The JTWC's peak intensity for Faxai was 75 km/h (47 mph) one-minute sustained, or 65 km/h (40 mph) 10-minute sustained.

== Preparations and impact ==
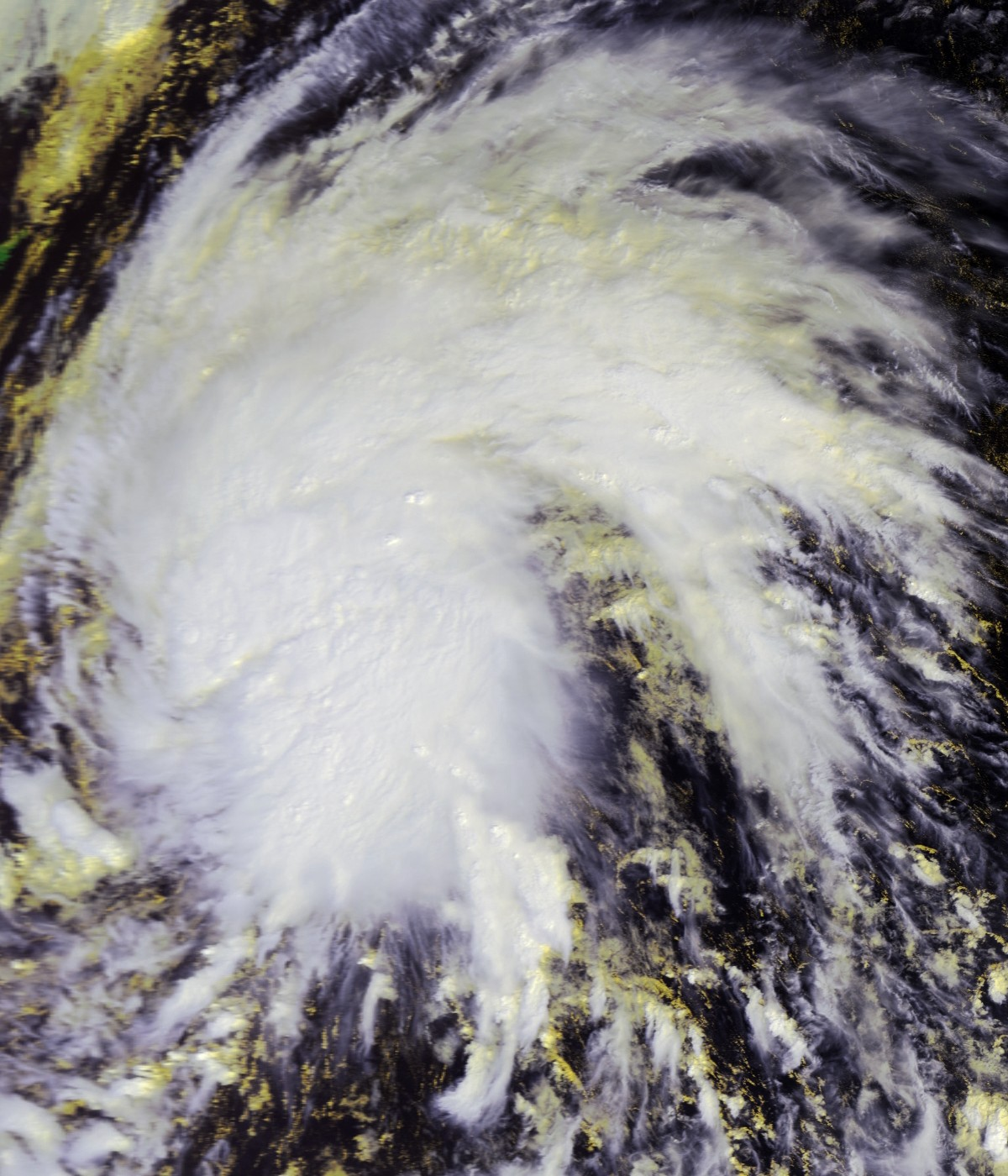
Tropical Storm Faxai on October 26

As Faxai approached Japan, All Nippon Airways canceled all of its day flights between Tokyo and the Izu Islands. Tokai Kisen, which operates ferries between Tokyo, the Izu Islands and Shizuoka Prefecture, canceled some services due to the storm. Areas around Tokyo were warned of the expected heavy rains, waves up to 6 m (20 ft), and high winds. Residents were advised to stay indoors during the storm, especially after sunset, and to avoid possible flying debris.

Although Faxai did not make landfall, the outer bands produced heavy rains, which caused minor damage along the eastern coast of Japan. The highest total rainfall was recorded on Miyakejima at 458 mm (18.0 in) and in the Ōshima Subprefecture of Tokyo, 192 mm (7.6 in) was recorded. The rainfall in Miyakejima nearly surpassed the record daily rainfall for October 27. Rainfall rates peaked at 95 mm/h (3.7 in/h) on Miyaketsubota, which triggered seven mudslides throughout the country. One woman was killed near Tokyo, and three people were injured. One home, two hectares of farmland, 2 km (1.2 mi) of roads, and one ship were damaged by the storm. At the height of the storm, 9,605 residences were without power throughout Japan. Damages from cyclone totaled ¥150 million (US$1.5 million).

At 5:31 pm Japan Standard Time (0831 UTC) on October 27, a Japan Airlines Boeing 767-300 heading to Narita International Airport, encountered severe turbulence from Faxai about 74 km (46 mi) southeast of Narita. The turbulence caused seven injuries on the flight, as well as some damage to the plane.

== See also ==
- Other tropical cyclones named Faxai
- Other tropical cyclones named Juaning
- Timeline of the 2007 Pacific typhoon season
