= Cyclone Trina =

Category 1 South Pacific cyclone in 2001

Tropical Cyclone Trina
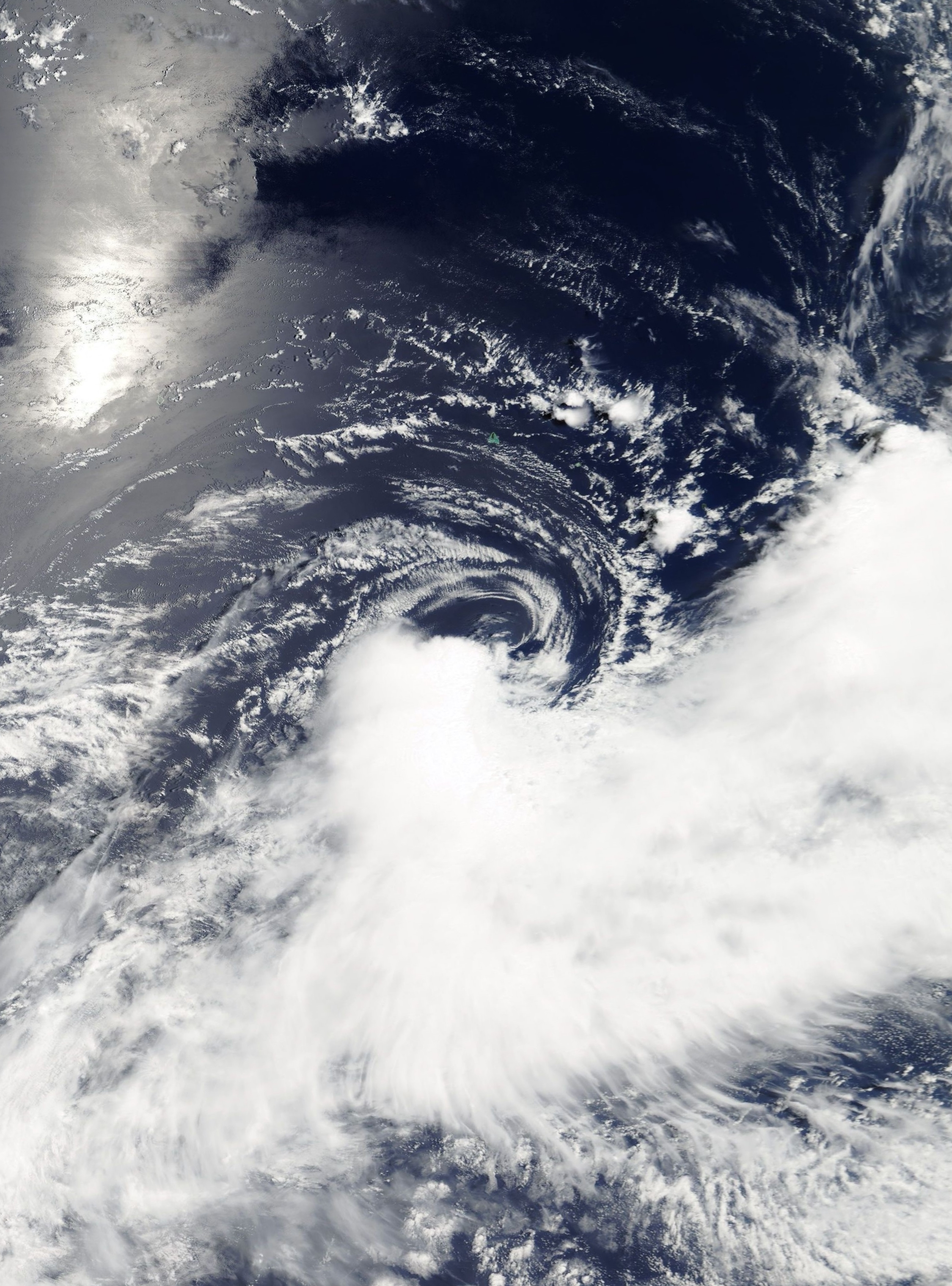
- Cyclone Trina near peak intensity on November 29

Meteorological history
- Formed: 29 November 2001
- Dissipated: 3 December 2001

Category 1 tropical cyclone
- 10-minute sustained (FMS)
- Highest winds: 65 km/h (40 mph)
- Highest gusts: 100 km/h (65 mph)
- Lowest pressure: 995 hPa (mbar); 29.38 inHg

Tropical storm
- 1-minute sustained (SSHWS)
- Highest winds: 65 km/h (40 mph)

Overall effects
- Fatalities: None reported
- Damage: $52,000 (2001 USD)
- Areas affected: Rarotonga and Mangaia
- IBTrACS
- Part of the 2001–02 South Pacific cyclone season

Tropical Cyclone Trina (Fiji Meteorological Service designation: 01F, Joint Typhoon Warning Center designation: 06P) was a weak but destructive tropical cyclone in late 2001 which caused some of the worst flooding on the South Pacific island of Mangaia, Cook Islands, in nearly 50 years. Forming out of an upper-level low pressure system on November 29 near the island of Rarotonga, or roughly 1,470 mi (2,365 km) southeast of Fiji, Trina remained practically stationary as it meandered in the same general area for over a week. Due to unfavorable conditions for tropical cyclogenesis, the storm struggled to develop significant convection, preventing it from intensifying beyond 65 km/h (40 mph). After finally succumbing to wind shear on December 2, the system weakened to a tropical depression near Mangaia and dissipated several days later.

As a result of the cyclone's slow movement, heavy rains impacted the same area for more than a week, resulting in severe flooding. Throughout Mangaia, nearly 90% of the islands' staple crop was lost and about 60% of the livestock perished. Following an assessment of the damage, it was determined that US$52,000 was needed to repair losses. Due to the severity of damage caused by Trina, its name was retired in May 2002 and replaced with Tino.

== Meteorological history ==
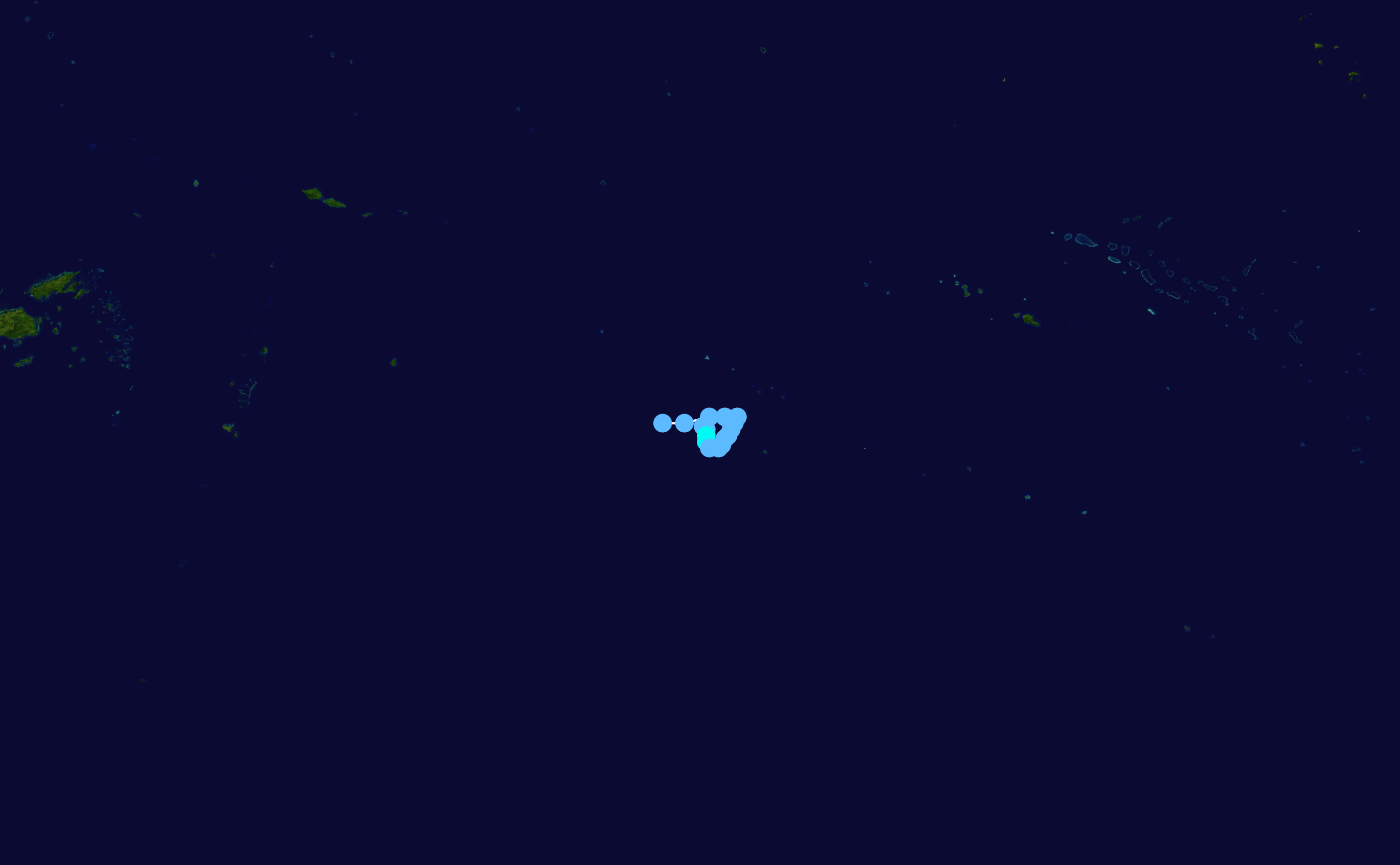
Map plotting the storm's track and intensity, according to the Saffir–Simpson scale Map key Saffir–Simpson scale Tropical depression (≤38 mph, ≤62 km/h) Tropical storm (39–73 mph, 63–118 km/h) Category 1 (74–95 mph, 119–153 km/h) Category 2 (96–110 mph, 154–177 km/h) Category 3 (111–129 mph, 178–208 km/h) Category 4 (130–156 mph, 209–251 km/h) Category 5 (≥157 mph, ≥252 km/h) Unknown Storm type Tropical cyclone Subtropical cyclone Extratropical cyclone, remnant low, tropical disturbance, or monsoon depression

Tropical Cyclone Trina was identified by the Regional Specialized Meteorological Center in Nadi, Fiji, the Fiji Meteorological Service (FMS), on 18 November 2001 as an upper-level low west of Rarotonga, an island situated roughly 2,355 km (1,465 mi) east-southeast of Fiji. Little development took place over the following ten days as the low gradually made its way to the surface. Situated in a region of relatively low wind shear, the system acquired subtropical characteristics before deep convection formed around its center. Late on November 29, the FMS upgraded the low to a tropical depression and assigned it the identifier 01F. However, the system later entered an area unfavorable to tropical cyclogenesis, consisting of increasing shear and marginally warm sea surface temperatures, estimated between 26 and 27 °C (79 and 81 °F). Drifting westward, convection managed to increase despite unfavorable conditions, as the low passed roughly 45 km (30 mi) southwest of Rarotonga on November 30. Later that day, the Joint Typhoon Warning Center (JTWC) issued a Tropical Cyclone Formation Alert, stating a "good" chance of the system becoming a tropical cyclone within 48 hours. Although the center remained partially devoid of convective activity, the system was declared Tropical Depression 06P by the agency within hours of the alert.

Later on November 30, the depression further intensified into a tropical cyclone and was given the name Trina by the FMS. At this time, gale-force winds were only present in one quadrant of the storm. In previous years, gale-force winds had to be present all around the center for the system to receive a name. Upon receiving its name, Trina attained its peak intensity with winds of 65 km/h (40 mph) along with a barometric pressure of 995 mbar (hPa; 29.38 inHg). Remaining nearly stationary, Trina succumbed to strong wind shear during the evening of November 30. The JTWC only classified Trina as a tropical storm for 12 hours before downgrading the system and issuing their final advisory early on December 1. However, according to the FMS, the system retained gale-force winds through December 2, by which time it was situated about 70 km (45 mi) northwest of Mangaia. Now significantly displaced from any convective activity, the remnants of Trina persisted in the same general area for several more days before completely dissipating.

== Impact and aftermath ==
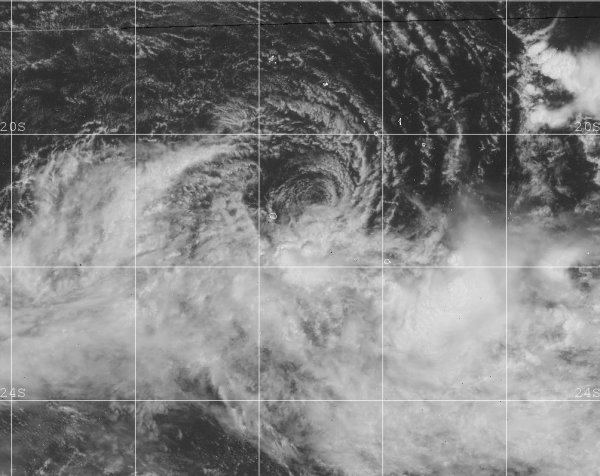
Cyclone Trina succumbing to wind shear hours after being named on November 30

Following Tropical Depression 01F's upgrade to Tropical Cyclone Trina on November 30, the Cook Islands were placed under a cyclone alert. Gale warnings were also put in place for the islands of Rarotonga and Mangaia for several days. Air New Zealand flights and many social events were cancelled to ensure public safety. Due to the low intensity of the storm, the main threat was not wind damage, although gusts up to 100 km/h (65 mph) were reported in Rarotonga. Owing to the slow movement of the storm, heavy rains associated with Trina fell on Mangaia for nearly eight days, resulting in widespread flooding. Parts of the island were inundated with up to 2 m (6.6 ft) of water, destroying nearly 95% of the taro crop and drowning numerous livestock. Several of the islands' main roads were washed out and a few reports of landslides were made.

The flooding on Mangaia was regarded as the worst in almost 50 years, as nearly the entire island was affected. According to locals, the ocean surrounding the island became red at one point due to the amount of soil being washed out to sea. Despite initial reports that the local water supply was contaminated, the International Federation of Red Cross And Red Crescent Societies (IFRC) stated that it was safe to drink and there was a sufficient amount for all of the islands' 744 residents. Offshore, a sailboat was severely damaged by large swells produced by the storm and was on the verge of sinking. The sailor managed to secure the vessel and make it safely to shore.

The flooding on Mangaia persisted for nearly a week before finally subsiding. Once the waters receded, the full extent of damage was revealed. Although only minor structural damage was sustained, the agricultural sector received extensive losses. Nearly 90% of the islands' staple crop was lost and about 60% of all the livestock perished. Following an assessment made by the Cook Islands National Disaster Management Council, it was determined that US$52,000 was needed to repair losses from Trina. International assistance from the United Nations was eventually requested on December 12, allowing for relief funds from several agencies to be delivered to the area. Fears of food shortages also prompted the local government to begin stockpiling food should it become a necessary relief supply. A total of US$24,140 was committed in relief funds by New Zealand, Norway and the United Nations to assist the Cook Islands in recovering from the storm. By late-December, an additional F$20,000 (US$11,000) was distributed by the Pacific Islands Forum Secretariat to the affected islands. In the months following Cyclone Trina, debris removal and clean-up was relatively slow, delaying efforts to replant crops lost in the floods. Food shortage issues became apparent in February 2002, prompting the IFRC to distribute food to all of Mangaia's residents.

Due to the severity of damage caused by Trina, its name was later retired.

== See also ==
- 2001–02 South Pacific cyclone season
- List of historic tropical cyclone names
