= 2001–02 South Pacific cyclone season =

Tropical cyclone season

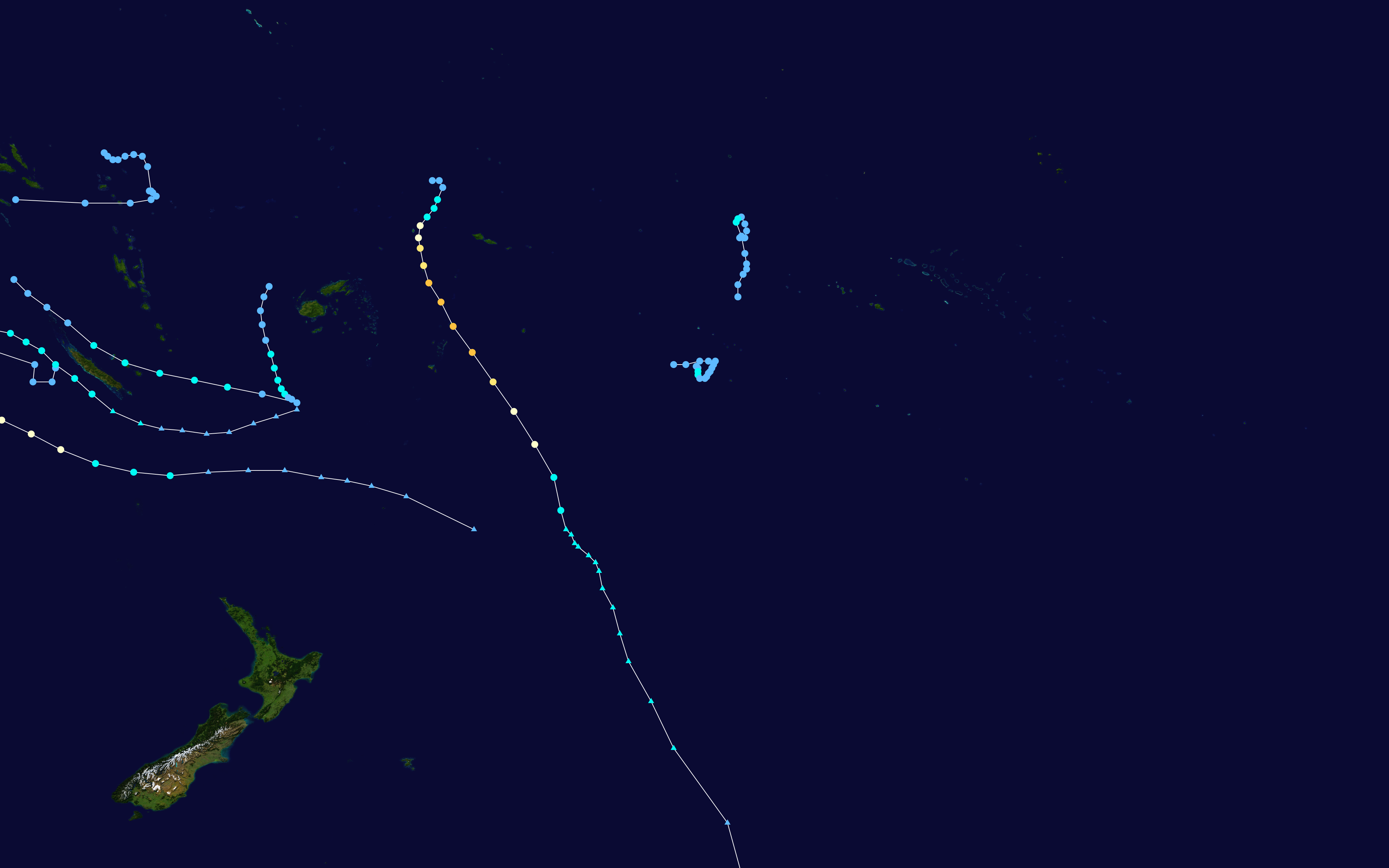
- Season summary map

Seasonal boundaries
- First system formed: November 29, 2001
- Last system dissipated: April 22, 2002

Strongest storm
- Name: Waka
  - Maximum winds: 185 km/h (115 mph) (10-minute sustained)
  - Lowest pressure: 930 hPa (mbar)

Seasonal statistics
- Total disturbances: 17
- Total depressions: 16
- Tropical cyclones: 6
- Severe tropical cyclones: 2
- Total fatalities: 1 indirect
- Total damage: $51.3 million (2002 USD)

Related articles
- 2001–02 Australian region cyclone season; 2001–02 South-West Indian Ocean cyclone season

The 2001–02 South Pacific cyclone season was a below-average year in which only five named storms formed or entered the South Pacific basin. It began on November 1, 2001, and ended on April 30, 2002. These dates conventionally delimit the period of each year when most tropical cyclones form in the southern Pacific Ocean east of 160°E. Additionally, the regional tropical cyclone operational plan defines a tropical cyclone year separately from a tropical cyclone season, and the "tropical cyclone year" runs from July 1, 2001, to June 30, 2002. The season's sixteen tropical depressions existed within these dates with the first developing on November 29 and the last dissipating on April 22.

The South Pacific Basin, as defined by the World Meteorological Organization, is split into two sub-areas, monitored by separate agencies. The first area is between 160°E and 120°W and north of 25°S are monitored by the Fiji Meteorological Service (FMS) in Nadi. Those that move south of 25°S are monitored by the Tropical Cyclone Warning Centre in Wellington, New Zealand. At the start of the season, a new naming policy was introduced by the Tropical Cyclone Committee for the South Pacific and South- East Indian Ocean. The policy stated that a storm attaining gale-force winds in only one quadrant near its center would be named by the Fiji Meteorological Service. This is in contrast to the previous policy in which gale-force winds had to completely surround the center to be named.

Throughout the season, a shift in the Hadley Circulation towards the Tasman Sea resulted in more frequent episodes of strong wind shear and regular pulses of dry air into the deep tropics, significantly hindering tropical cyclogenesis. The below-average activity was also reflected in an unusually low number of damaging storms. Only two systems, Trina and Waka, had significant effects on land. The former caused extensive flooding on Mangaia while the latter was regarded as one of the most damaging storms in the history of Tonga. Approximately $51.3 million in damage was attributed to Waka as well as an indirect fatality, the only tropical cyclone-related death of the year, due to cardiac arrest.

== Seasonal summary ==
During the 2001–02 South Pacific cyclone season, only five tropical cyclones and two severe tropical cyclones formed or entered the region. These numbers are substantially below the seasonal average of nine tropical cyclones and four to five severe tropical cyclones. This continued an inactive trend seen by several years prior; however, it was slightly more active than the previous year. Throughout the season, an eastward shift in the Hadley Circulation led to an eastward displacement of the subtropical jet maximum, placing it near the Tasman Sea, similar to what takes place during an El Niño (ENSO) event. However, ENSO indexes were neutral during the season. This displacement of the subtropical jet resulted in the regular formation of strong mid-level troughs across Australia and the South Pacific, leading to an abundance of moderate to strong wind shear. Additionally, these systems brought pulses of dry mid-level air that moved as far north as 10°S. This was reflected by the below-average monthly relative humidity values across the basin. Sea surface temperatures were also generally slightly below-average through January 2002 and only slight warming took place during the remainder of the season. The development of cyclones during the season was mainly, aside from Trina, tied into Madden–Julian oscillation (MJO) phases. Trina developed prior to the arrival of the first MJO pulse which reached the basin in early December. This first pulse led to the development of several equatorial Rossby waves – the formations of Cyclones Vicky and Waka were related to these waves. The second pulse arrived in mid-February and was associated with the development of Cyclones Claudia and Des.

== Systems ==
=== Tropical Cyclone Trina ===
- Category 1 tropical cyclone (Australian scale)
- Tropical storm (SSHWS)
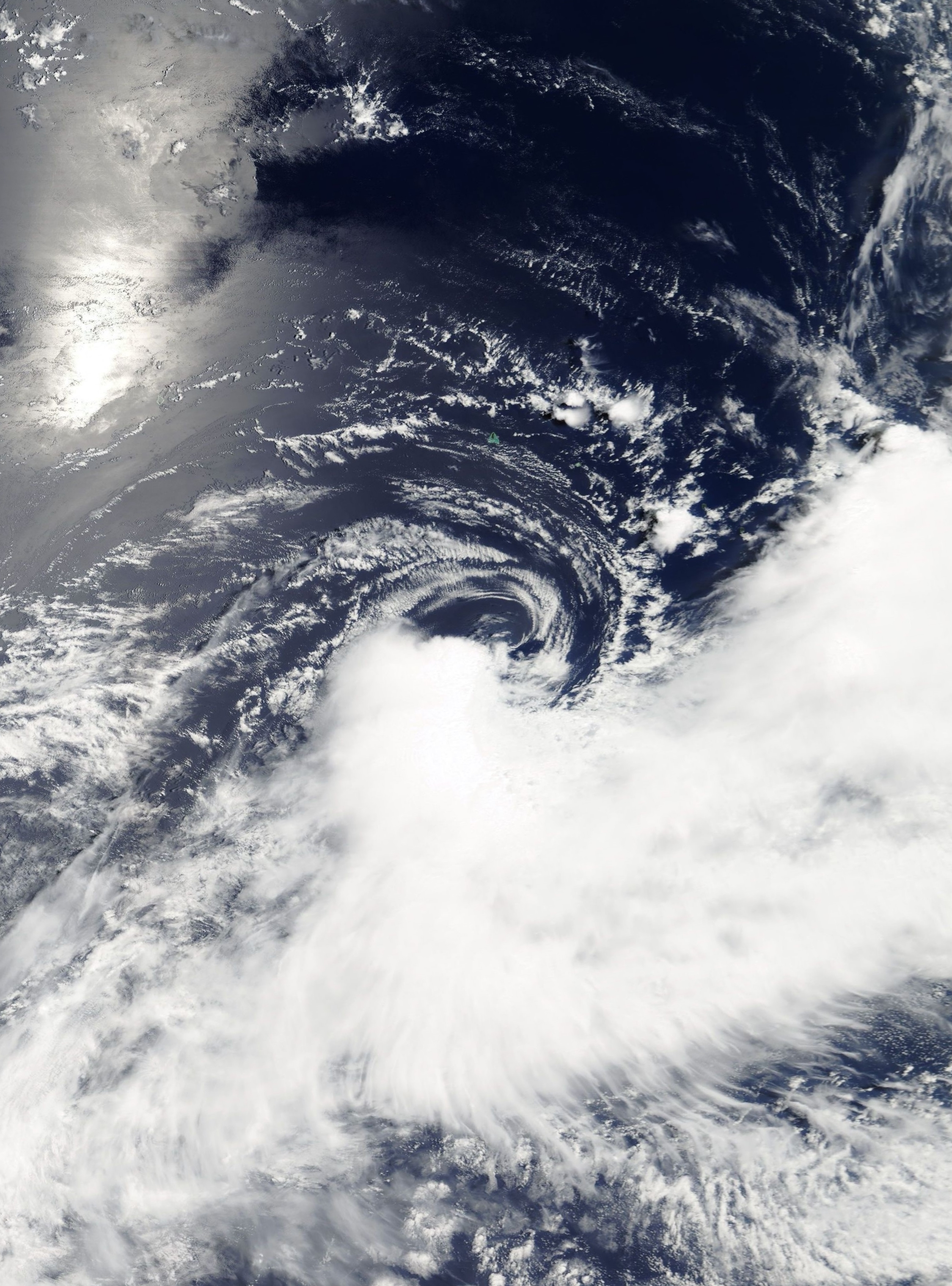
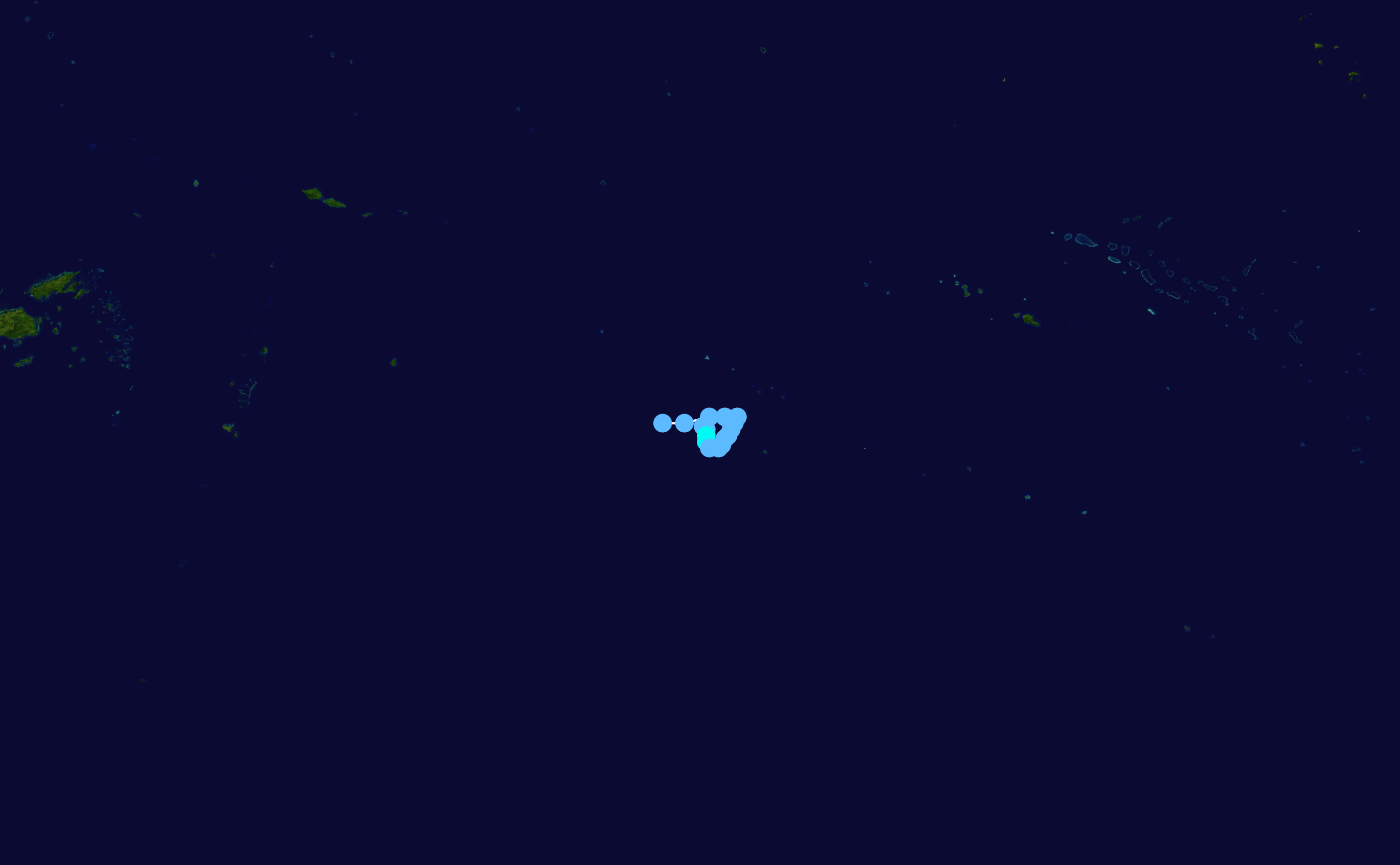
- Duration: November 29 – December 3
- Peak intensity: 65 km/h (40 mph) (10-min); 995 hPa (mbar)

The first tropical cyclone of the season, Trina formed upper-level low-pressure system on November 29 near the island of Rarotonga. Remaining nearly stationary, the storm meandered in the same general area for over a week. Due to unfavorable conditions for tropical cyclogenesis, the storm struggled to develop significant convection, preventing it from intensifying beyond 65 km/h (40 mph). After finally succumbing to wind shear on December 2, the system weakened to a tropical depression near Mangaia and dissipated several days later.

Due to the slow movement of the storm, it produced substantial rainfall over the island of Mangaia, resulting in some of the worst flooding in 50 years. Although no people were killed, nearly 60% of the islands' livestock died and 90% of the staple crop was lost. Estimates from the Cook Islands National Disaster Management Council placed damage at $52,000.

=== Severe Tropical Cyclone Waka ===
- Category 4 severe tropical cyclone (Australian scale)
- Category 3 tropical cyclone (SSHWS)
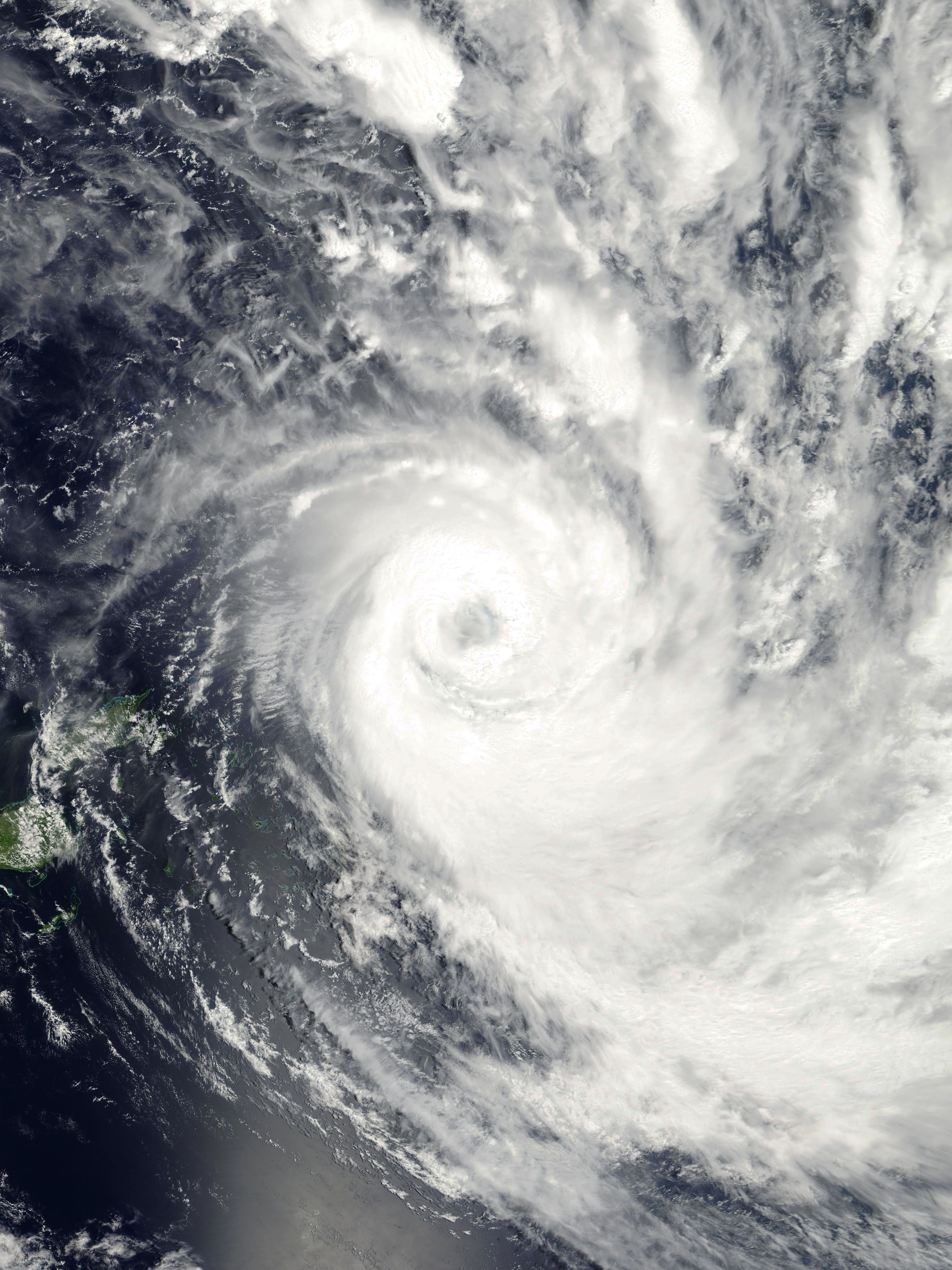
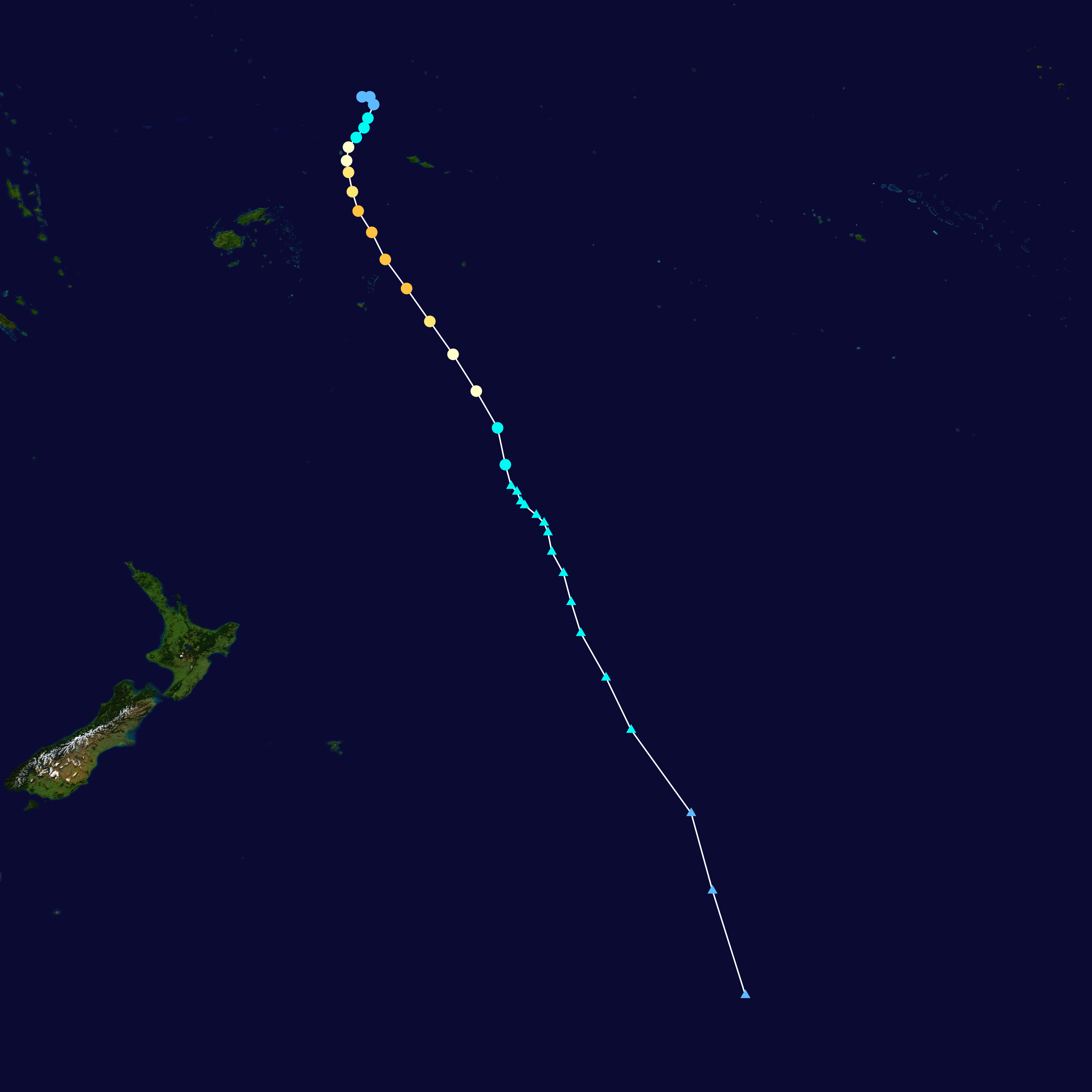
- Duration: December 19 – January 2
- Peak intensity: 185 km/h (115 mph) (10-min); 930 hPa (mbar)

Waka originated in a near-equatorial trough of low pressure in mid-December 2001, although the system remained disorganized for more than a week. The storm gradually matured and attained tropical cyclone status on December 29. Subsequently, Waka underwent rapid intensification in which it attained its peak intensity as a Category 4 severe tropical cyclone on December 31, with winds of 185 km/h (115 mph). Shortly thereafter, it passed directly over Vava'u, resulting in widespread damage. By January 1, 2002, the cyclone began to weaken as it underwent an extratropical transition. The remnants of Waka persisted for several more days and were last observed near the Southern Ocean on January 6.

Throughout Waka's path, several countries were impacted by the storm; however, the most significant losses took place in Tonga. There, one person was killed and 104.2 million paʻanga ($51.3 million USD) was wrought in damage. Hundreds of structures were destroyed and much of the nation's agriculture was destroyed. Winds in excess of 185 km/h (115 mph) battered Vava'u, destroying 200 homes in the island's largest city. In addition to infrastructural and public losses, the environment was also severely affected; a native species of bats lost roughly 80% of its population due to the lack of fruit. Following the storm, Tonga requested international aid to cope with the scale of damage.

=== Tropical Cyclone Vicky ===
- Category 1 tropical cyclone (Australian scale)
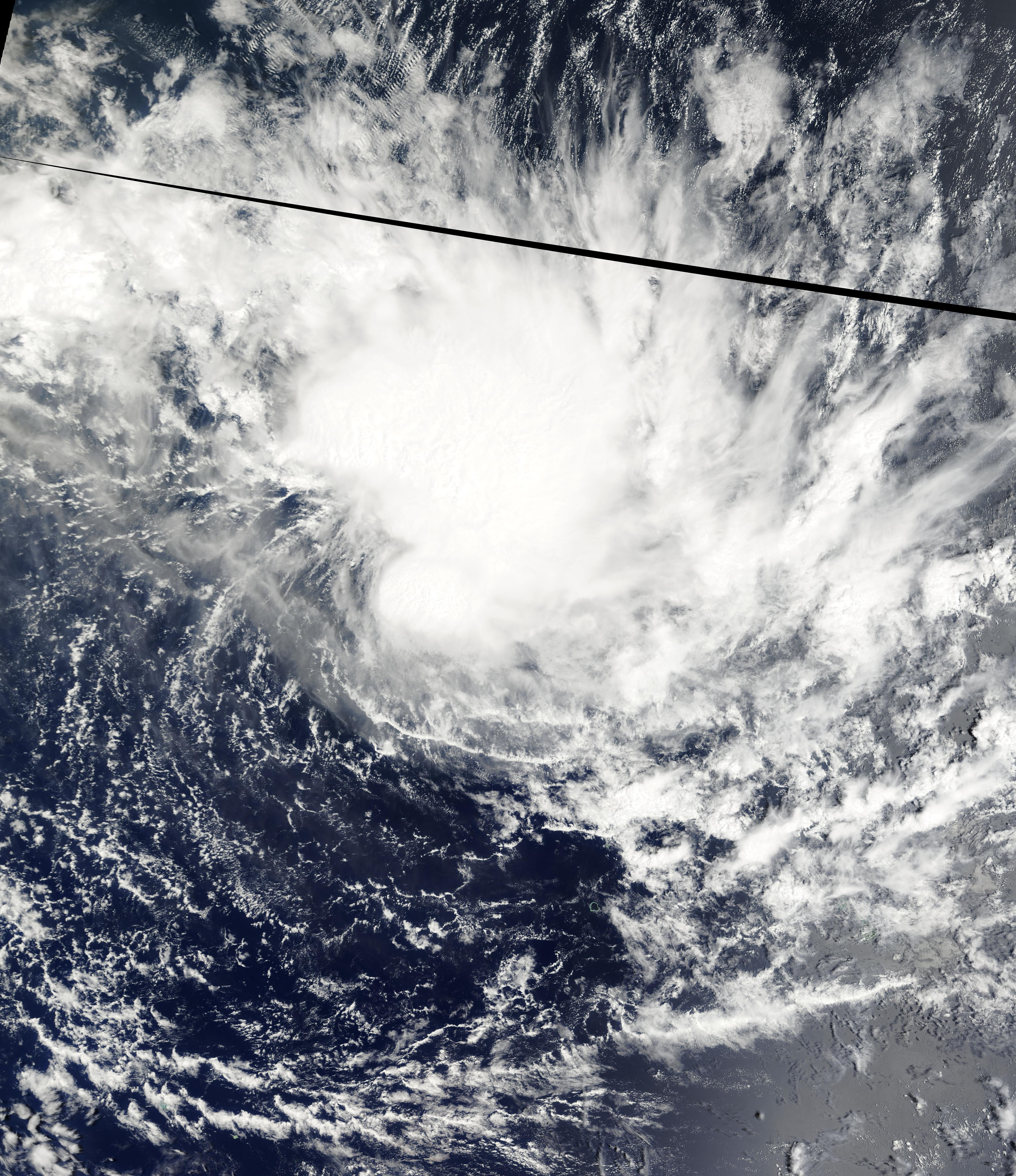
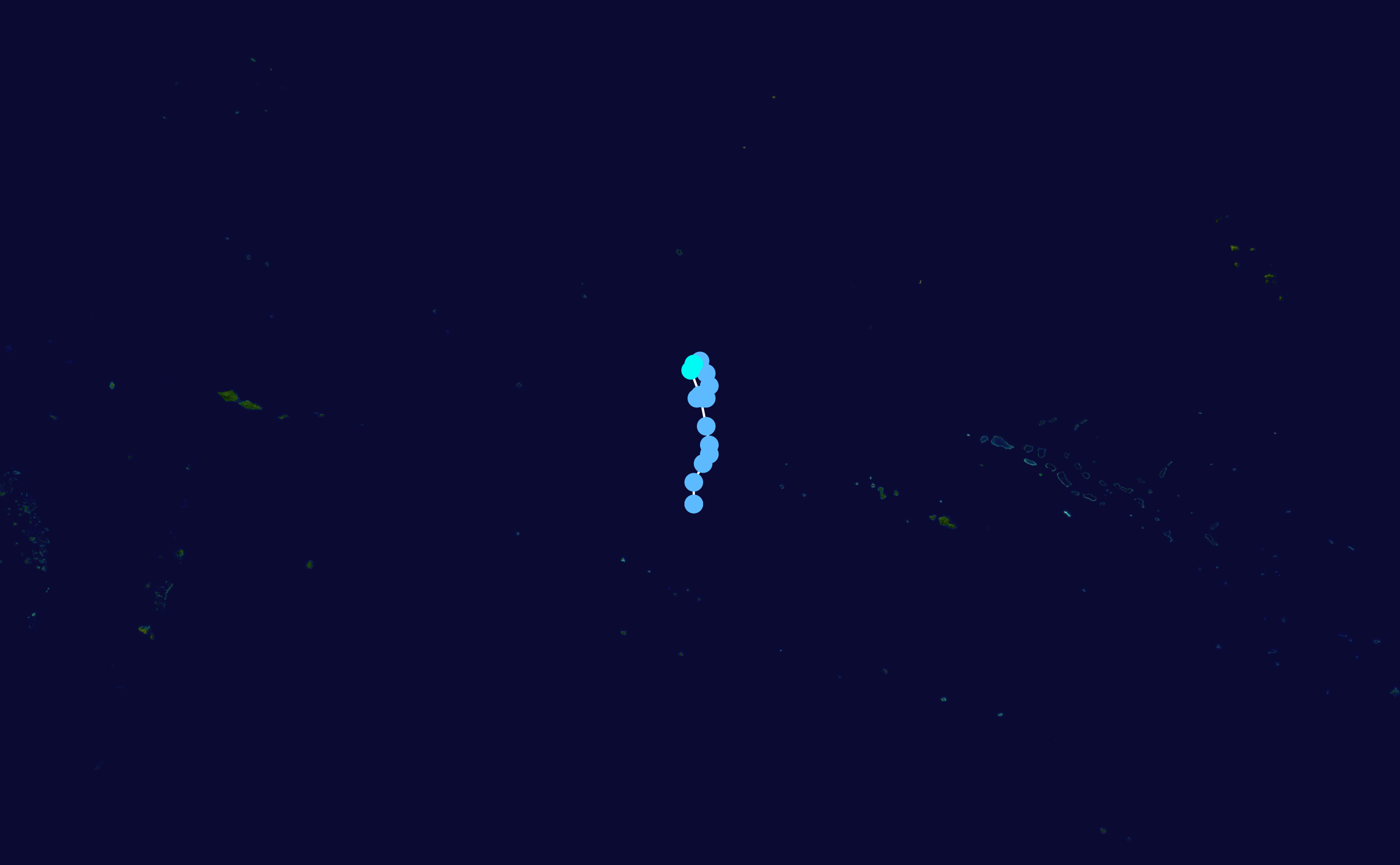
- Duration: December 22 – December 26
- Peak intensity: 65 km/h (40 mph) (10-min); 996 hPa (mbar)

Forming out of the same initial disturbance as Cyclone Waka, Tropical Cyclone Vicky formed within a region of moderate wind shear, inhibiting substantial development. The storm was first classified by the FMS on December 22 over open waters. Situated to the south of an upper-level ridge, the system tracked slowly towards the northeast and intensified, despite unfavorable conditions. Over the following two days, convection managed to persist along the northern edge of the system's center of circulation and on December 24, the FMS classified the low as Tropical Cyclone Vicky. At this time, Vicky was situated roughly 900 km (560 mi) north-northeast of Rarotonga. Shortly thereafter, wind shear increased in relation to an approaching trough, resulting in Vicky weakening to a tropical depression. Over the following several days, the depression drifted southward before entering the mid-latitude westerlies and re-intensifying into a strong extratropical cyclone well to the south of French Polynesia.

=== Tropical Depression 05F ===
- Tropical depression (Australian scale)
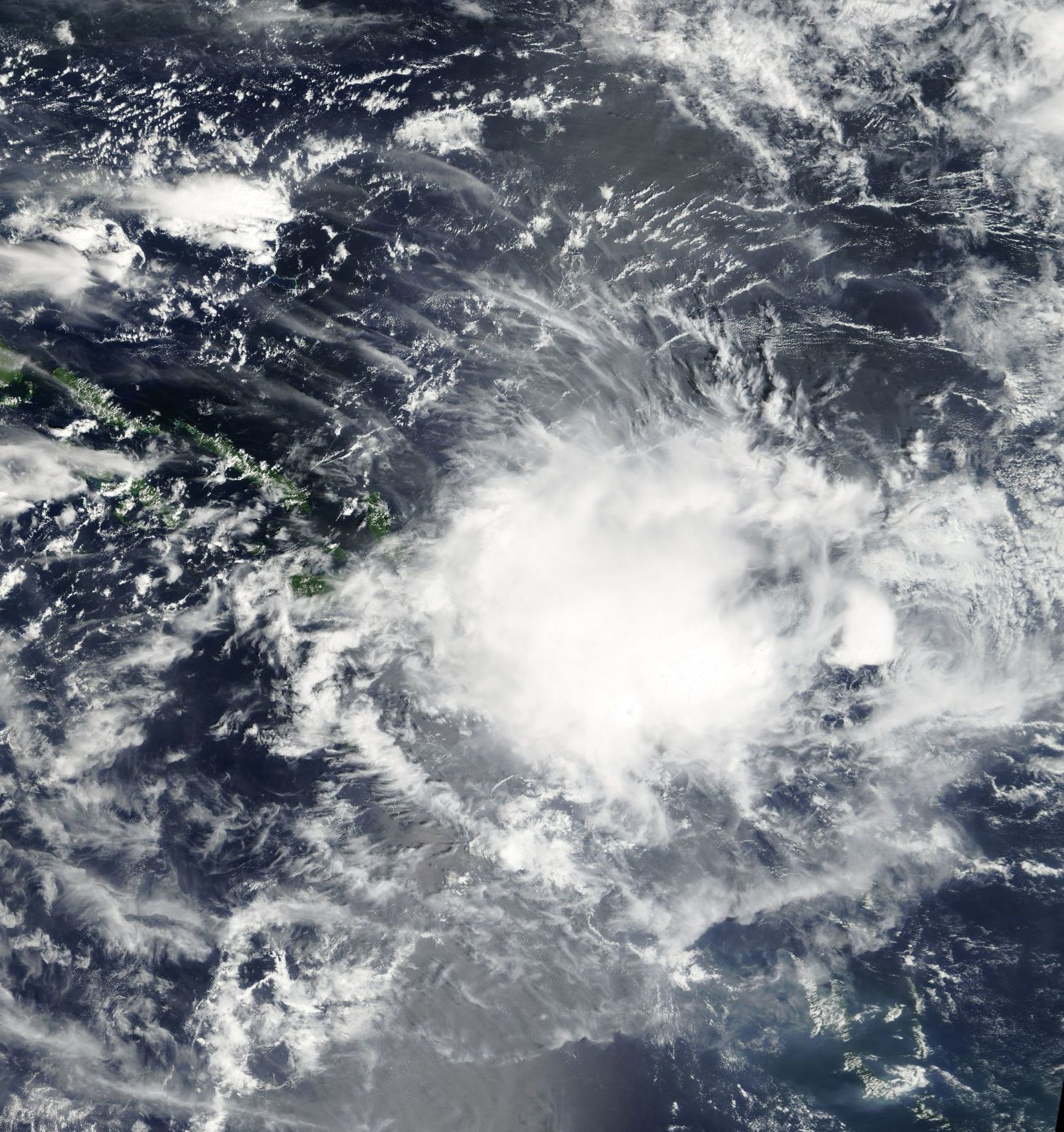
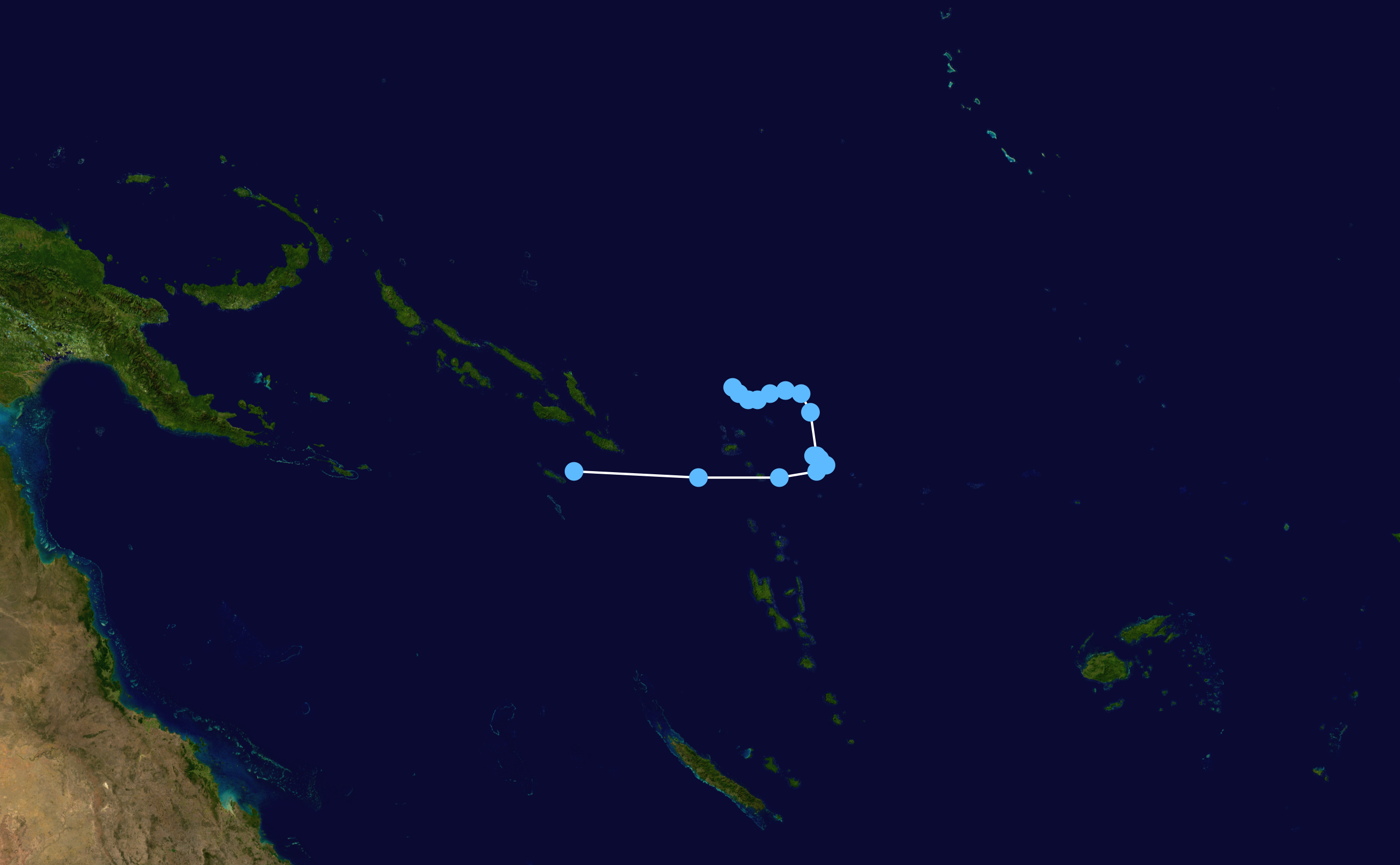
- Duration: December 31 – January 6 (exited basin)
- Peak intensity: 65 km/h (40 mph) (10-min); 998 hPa (mbar)

On December 31, the FMS began monitoring a new tropical depression, classified as 05F, roughly 600 km (370 mi) east-northeast of the Solomon Islands. A large system, similar to a monsoonal depression, 05F drifted southeastward for several days before turning towards the southwest. On January 1, the system attained its peak intensity with winds of 65 km/h (40 mph) and a pressure of 998 mbar (hPa; 29.47 inHg). Despite having gale-force winds, the system was not classified as a tropical cyclone since the winds were significantly displaced from the center of circulation. The JTWC determined the system had a good chance of developing into a tropical cyclone and issued a Tropical Cyclone Formation Alert (TCFA); however, this was later canceled as the depression failed to strengthen. By January 6, the system crossed 160°E and entered the Australian Bureau of Meteorology's area of responsibility.

=== Severe Tropical Cyclone Claudia ===
- Category 3 severe tropical cyclone (Australian scale)
- Category 1 tropical cyclone (SSHWS)
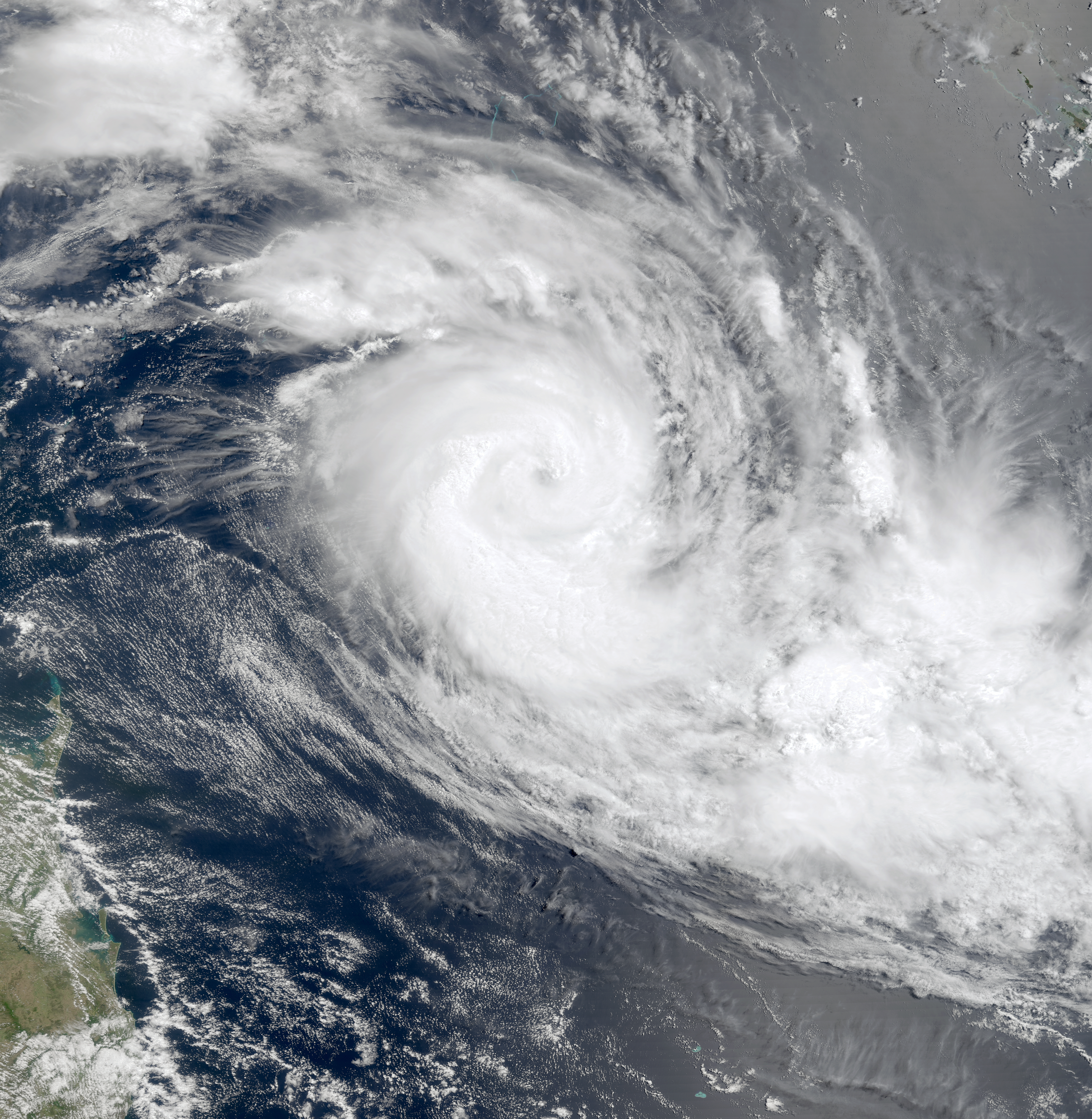
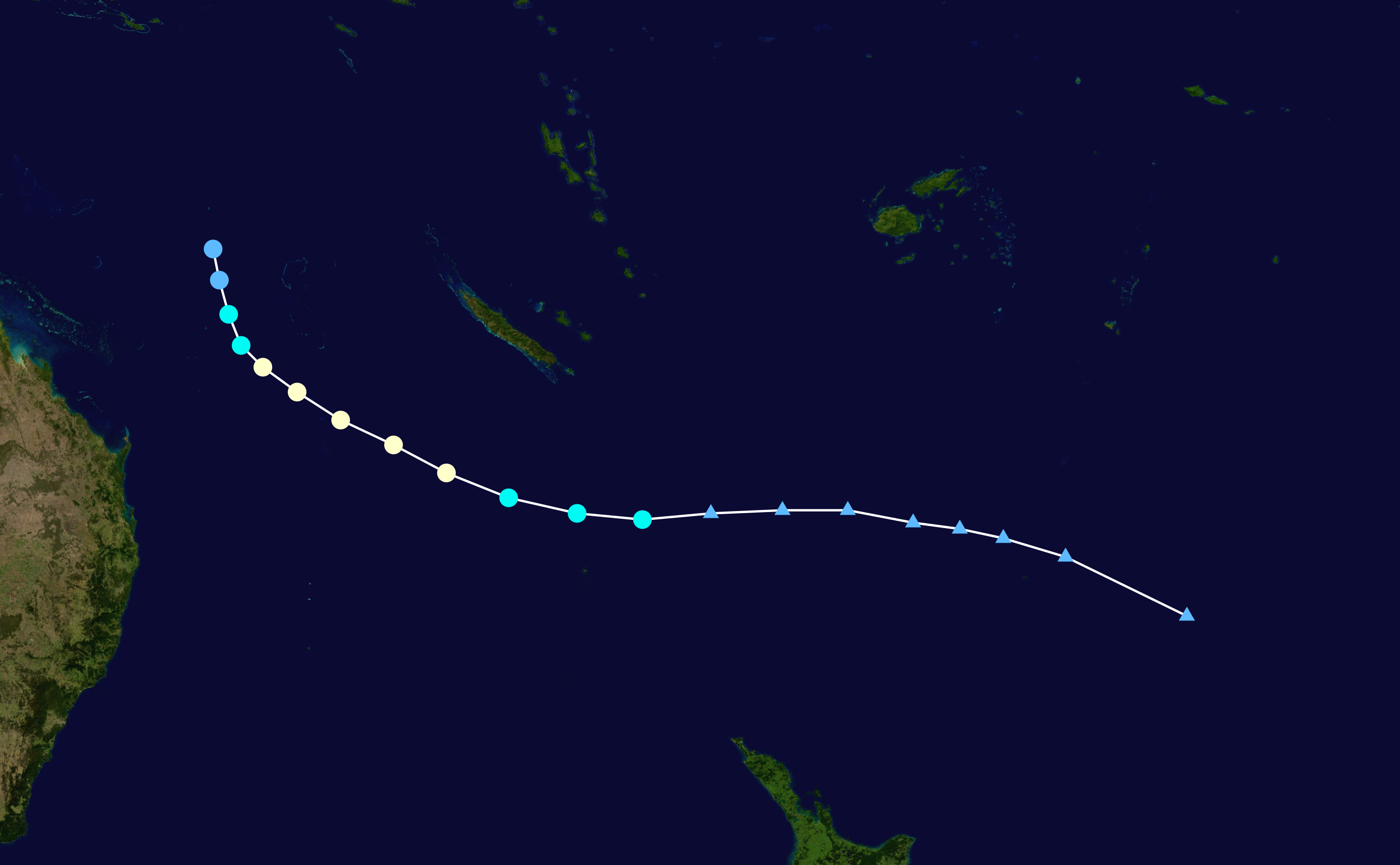
- Duration: February 12 (Entered basin) – February 14
- Peak intensity: 120 km/h (75 mph) (10-min); 965 hPa (mbar)

During the second phase of the MJO, a new low-pressure system developed over the Coral Sea, on February 9. Situated between two troughs over eastern Australia and the Tasman Sea, the system tracked towards the southeast and rapidly organized. The system was classified as Tropical Cyclone Claudia on February 11 and upgraded to a severe tropical cyclone less than 24 hours later. Later on February 12, the system crossed 160°E, entering the South Pacific basin at peak intensity. Maximum winds were estimated at 120 km/h (75 mph) and its minimum pressure was 965 mbar (hPa; 28.50 inHg). A ragged eye was briefly seen on satellite imagery before Claudia moved over decreasing sea surface temperatures. The combined effects of its rapid forward speed and increased wind shear quickly weakened the system. By February 13, Claudia had weakened to a non-convective tropical depression. The remnants of the storm persisted for another day before being absorbed by a frontal system well to the south of Tonga.

=== Tropical Depression 10F (16P) ===
- Tropical depression (Australian scale)
- Tropical storm (SSHWS)
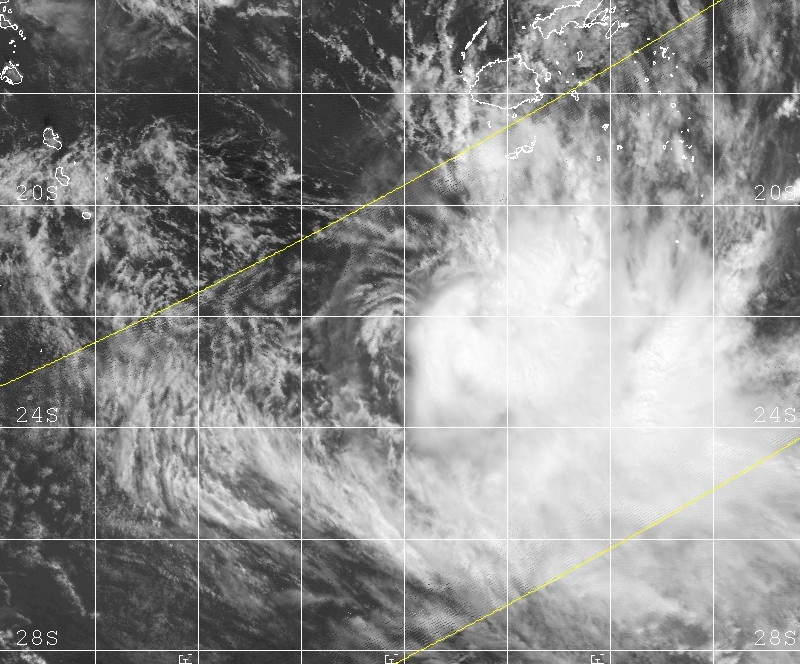
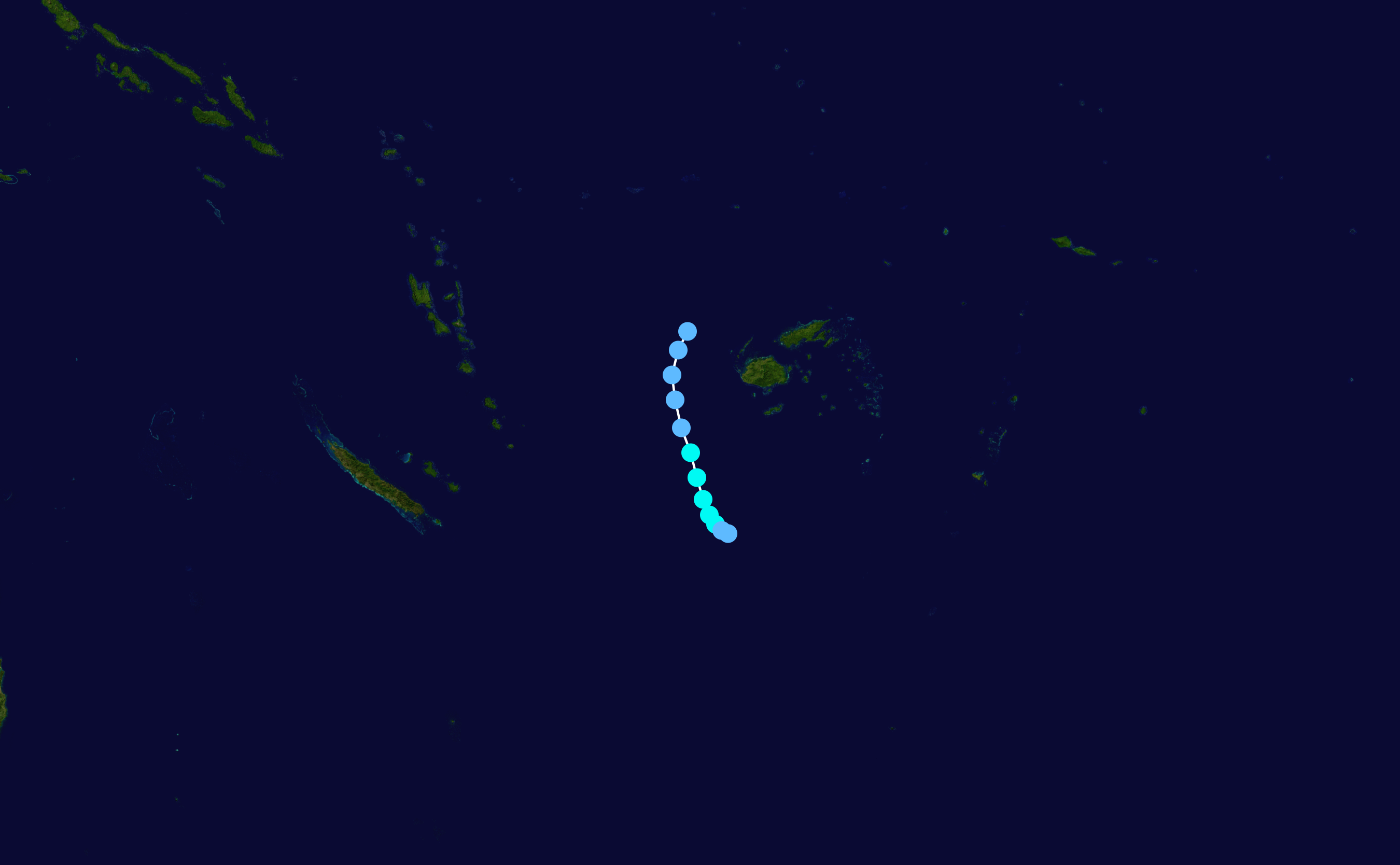
- Duration: February 23 – February 26
- Peak intensity: 65 km/h (40 mph) (10-min); 1000 hPa (mbar)

On February 19, a tropical disturbance developed to the north-northeast of Fiji. Situated within a monsoon trough and on the edge of an anticyclone, convection associated with the disturbance was limited to the north and eastern sides. Over the following four days, a weak low-level circulation gradually formed within a broad trough. By February 23, deep convection began consolidating around the newly formed center in response to weak diffluence aloft and moderate wind shear. Later that day, the FMS began monitoring the low as Tropical Depression 10F. Still embedded within the monsoon trough, the JTWC issued a TCFA early on February 24 and their first advisory on Tropical Depression 16P roughly 12 hours later. Early on February 25, the JTWC estimated the system to have become a tropical storm, with one-minute sustained winds of 65 km/h (40 mph). Although the FMS assessed the system to have had gale-force winds, they did not upgrade the depression to a tropical cyclone since the strongest winds were well removed from the center. Shortly after reaching this intensity, wind shear displaced convection to the east of the cyclone and the storm weakened. Continued shearing of the system left the low-level center fully exposed by February 26 and prompted the JTWC to issue their final warning on the depression. The weakening system was last noted later that day moving southward over open waters.

=== Tropical Cyclone Des ===
- Category 2 tropical cyclone (Australian scale)
- Tropical storm (SSHWS)
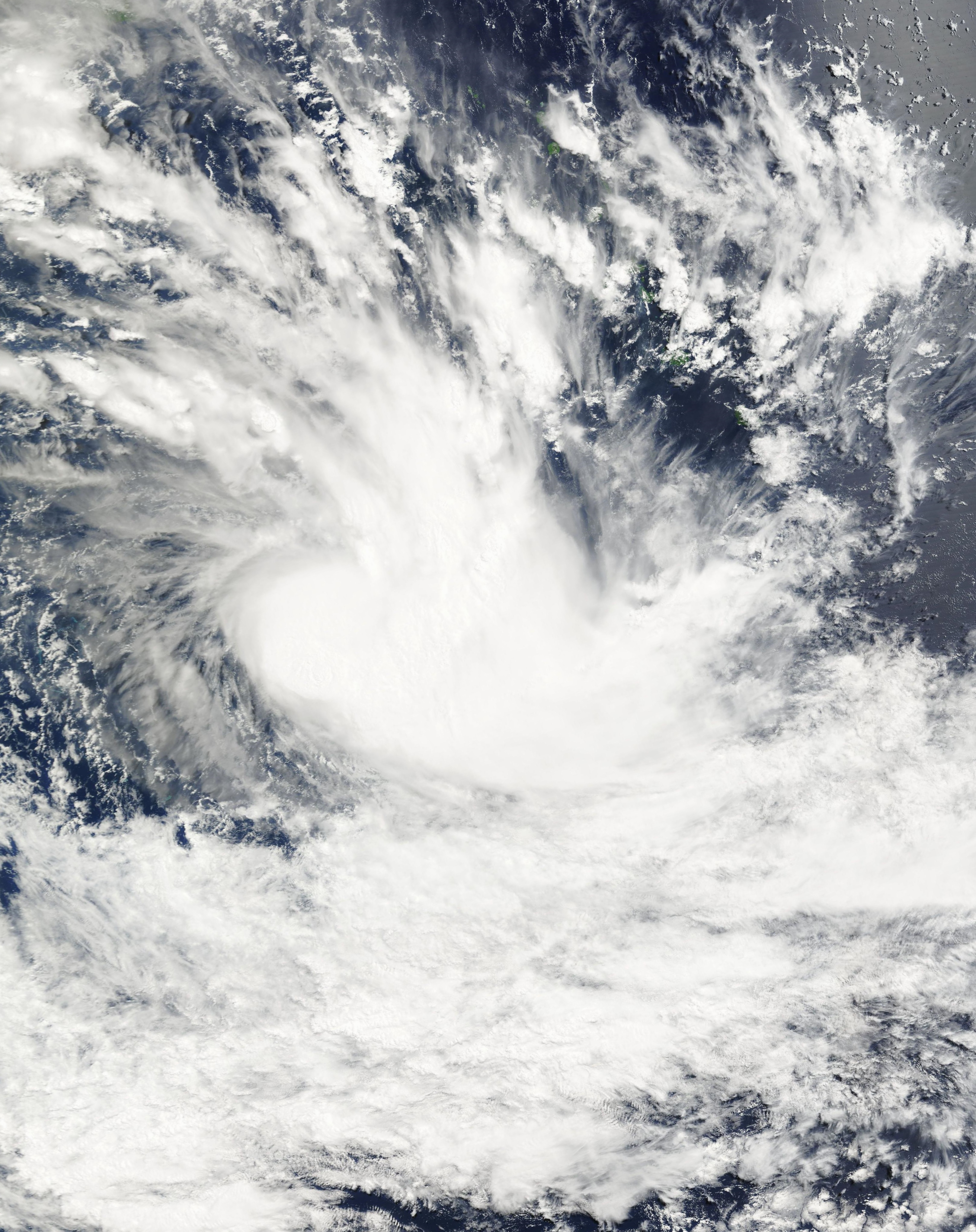
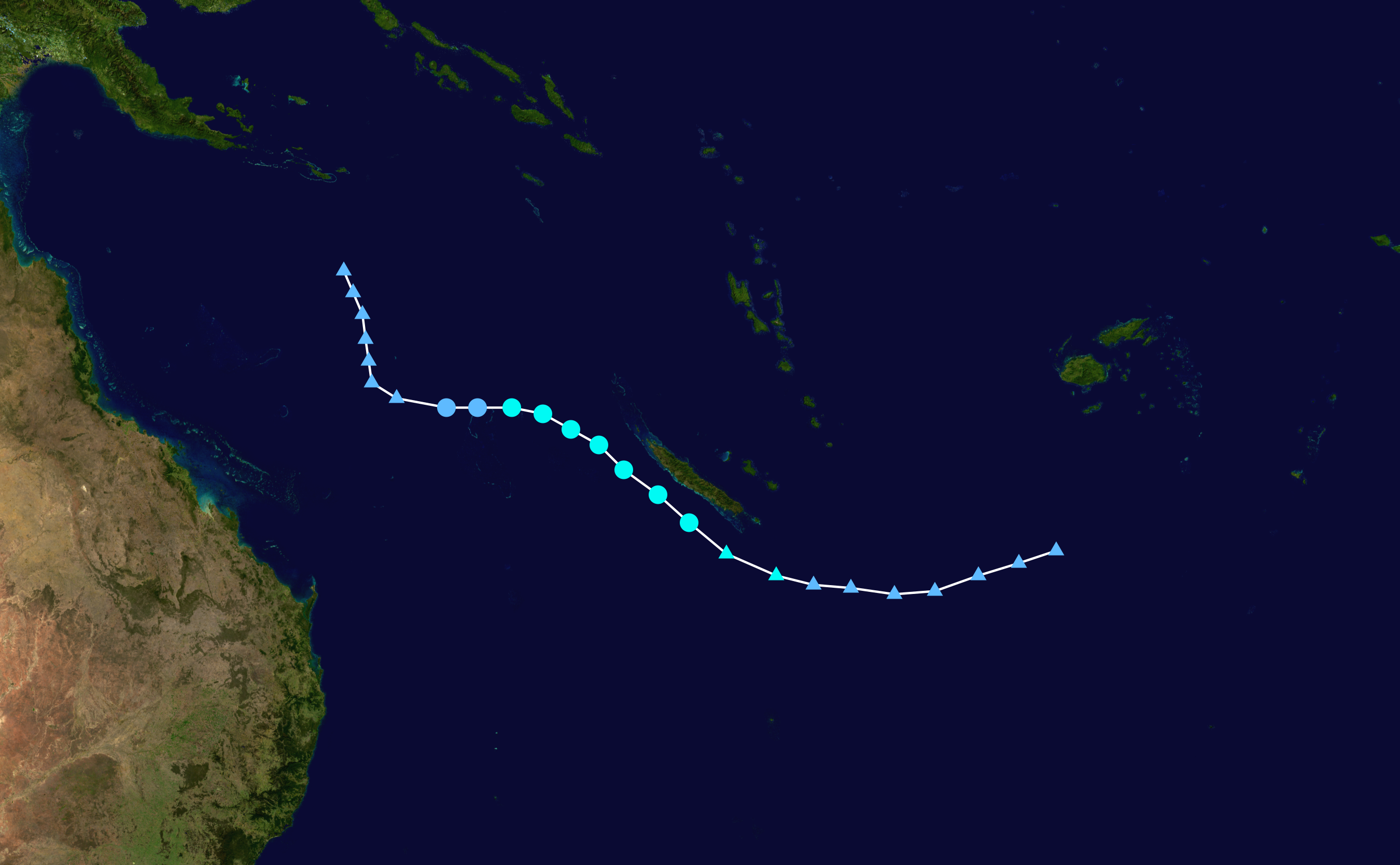
- Duration: March 5 – March 7
- Peak intensity: 95 km/h (60 mph) (10-min); 985 hPa (mbar)

Following a pattern similar to the formation of Cyclone Claudia, Des formed out of an area of disturbed weather east of Australia in late February. The precursor system formed at the same time as the initial disturbance which developed into Typhoon Mitag in the northwestern Pacific. By March 4, sufficient development had taken place to classify the system as a tropical depression and a tropical cyclone early the next day. During March 5, Des underwent a brief period of rapid intensification, attaining its peak strength of 60 mph (97 km/h) with a minimum pressure of 985 mbar (hPa; 29.09 inHg). Initially, the storm was forecast to impact New Caledonia; however, a mid-level ridge to the northeast forced the system to the southeast, sparing the island of a direct hit. Due to the storm's proximity to the mountains of New Caledonia and less favorable environmental conditions, Des began to weaken on March 6. The following day, the storm was devoid of convection, marking its degeneration into a remnant low-pressure system. The remnants of Des were monitored for a few more days before they dissipated south of Fiji.

Since Des remained off the coast of New Caledonia, the storm's strongest winds did not impact land; however, weather stations along the coast measured winds of 75 to 95 km/h (47 to 59 mph). No damage was reported in relation to Cyclone Des.

=== Tropical Depression 13F (19P) ===
- Tropical depression (Australian scale)
- Tropical storm (SSHWS)
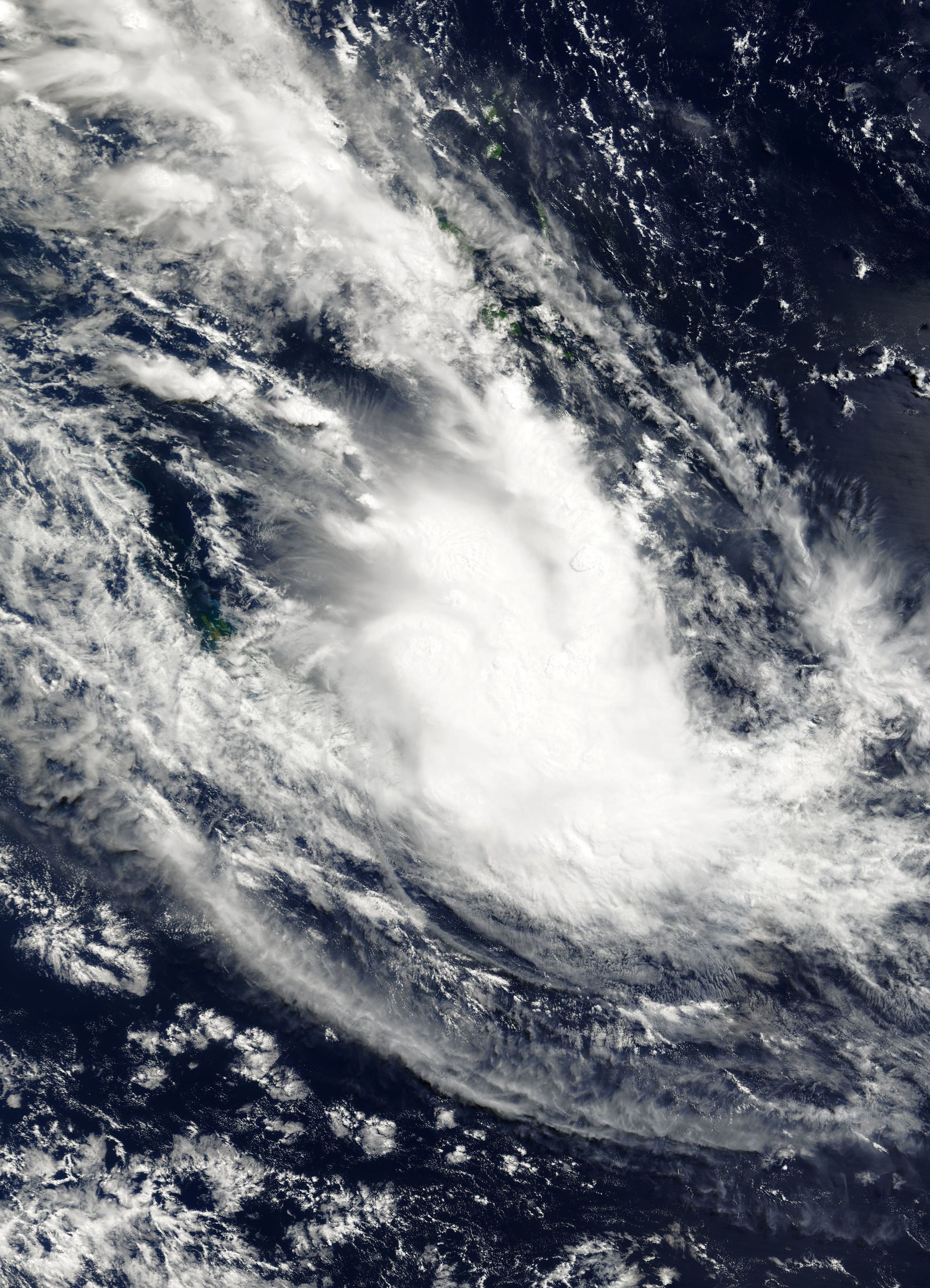
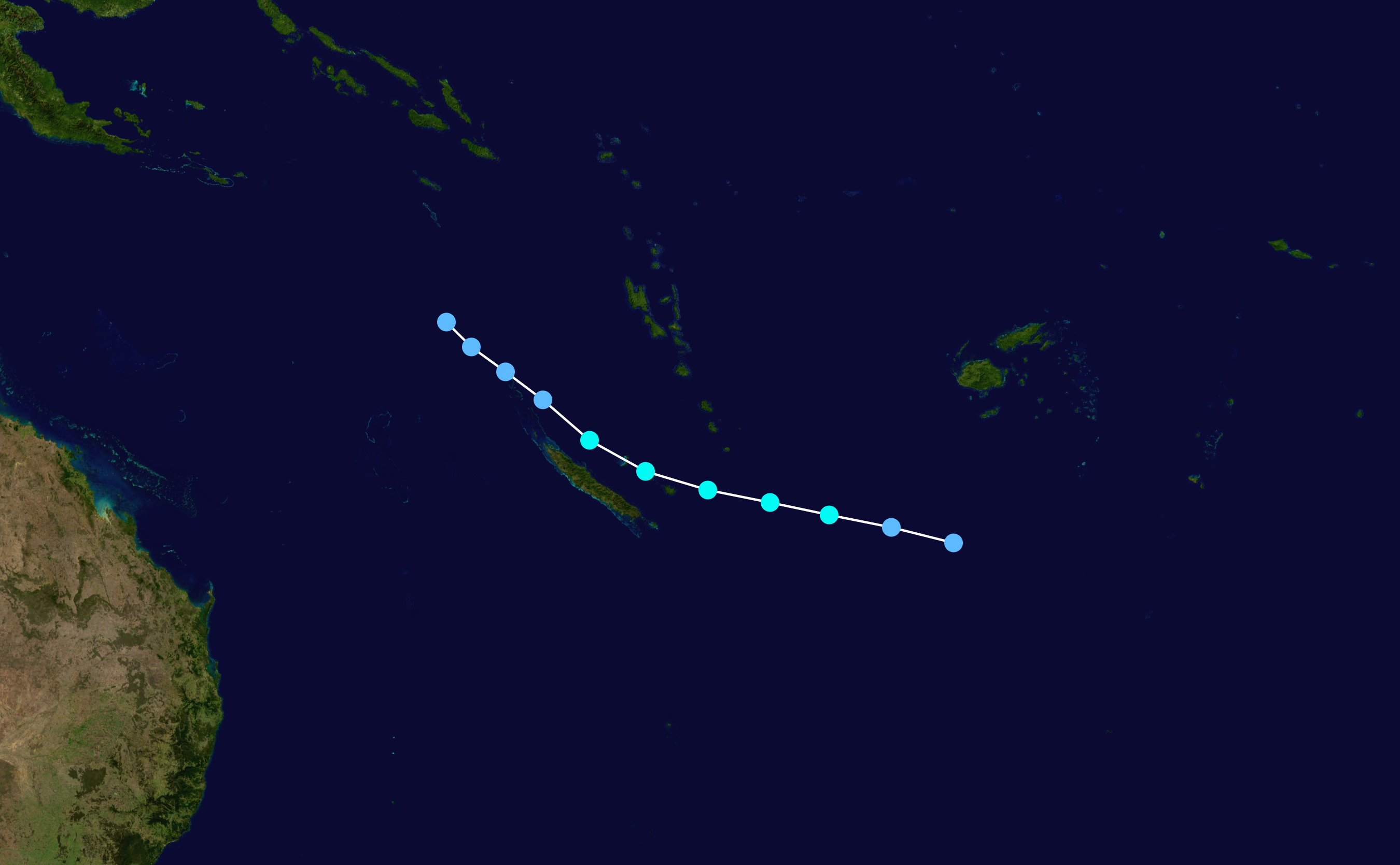
- Duration: March 13 – March 16
- Peak intensity: 65 km/h (40 mph) (10-min); 1000 hPa (mbar)

Early on March 13, a persistent area of convection, accompanied by a weak low-level circulation, was noted roughly 520 km (320 mi) west of Vanuatu. Situated underneath an upper-level ridge, the system experienced weak to moderate shear and had a favorable outflow. Later that day, the FMS began monitoring the system as Tropical Depression 13F. Early on March 14, the JTWC issued a TCFA and later their first advisory on Tropical Storm 19P as deep convection increased in coverage and organization around the low. The system tracked generally southeastward throughout its life in response to a low to mid-level ridge to its north-northeast. Both the FMS and JTWC estimated peak winds at 65 km/h (40 mph) as passed close to New Caledonia. Although the system passed close to the island, there were no reports of damage. After brushing New Caledonia, the system passed south of the ridge and experienced stronger shear, displacing convection to the southeast. By March 16, the system quickly weakened due to the combined effects of shear and decreasing sea surface temperatures. The system dissipated later that day well to the south of Fiji.

=== Unnamed Tropical Cyclone ===
- Category 1 tropical cyclone (Australian scale)
- Tropical storm (SSHWS)
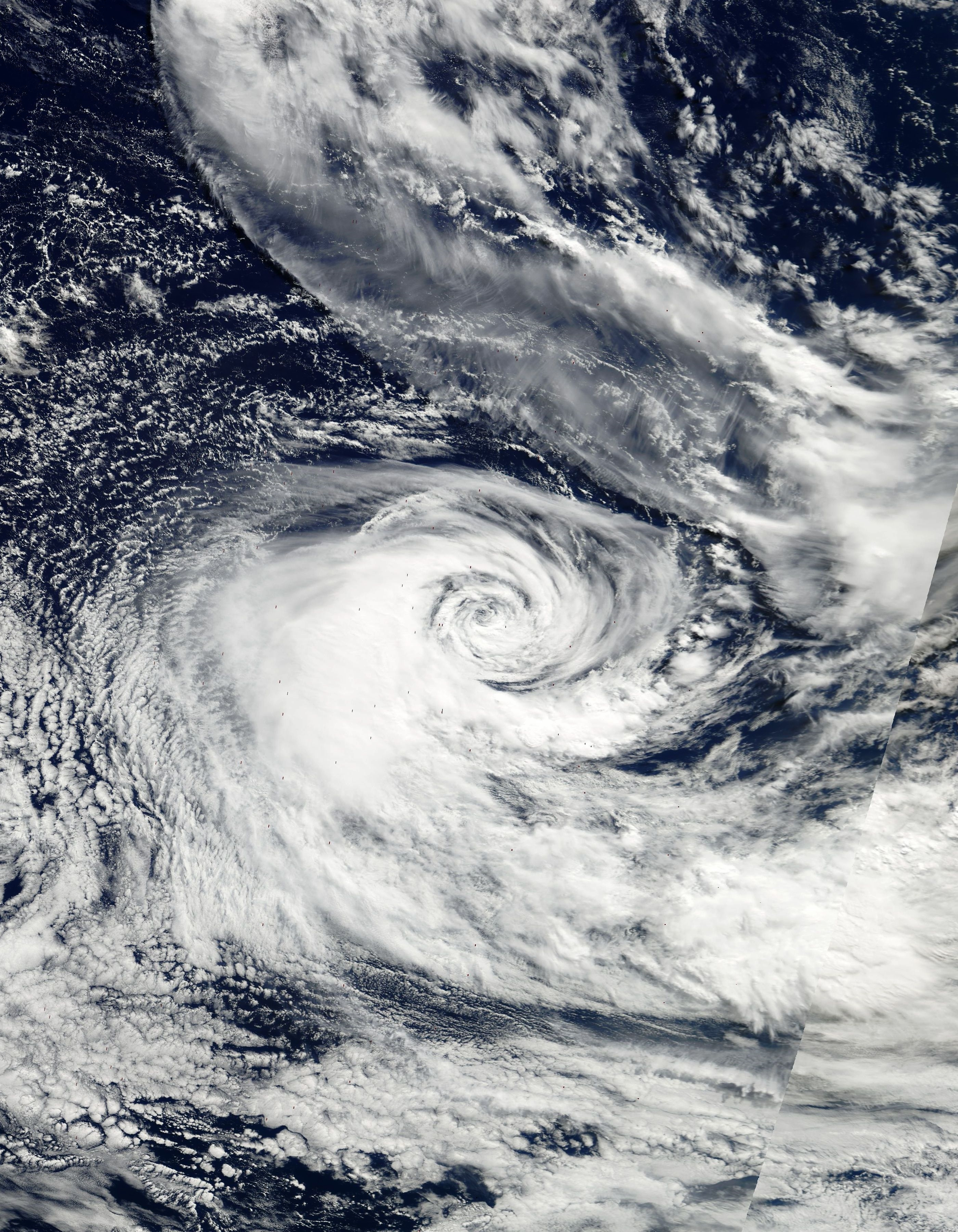
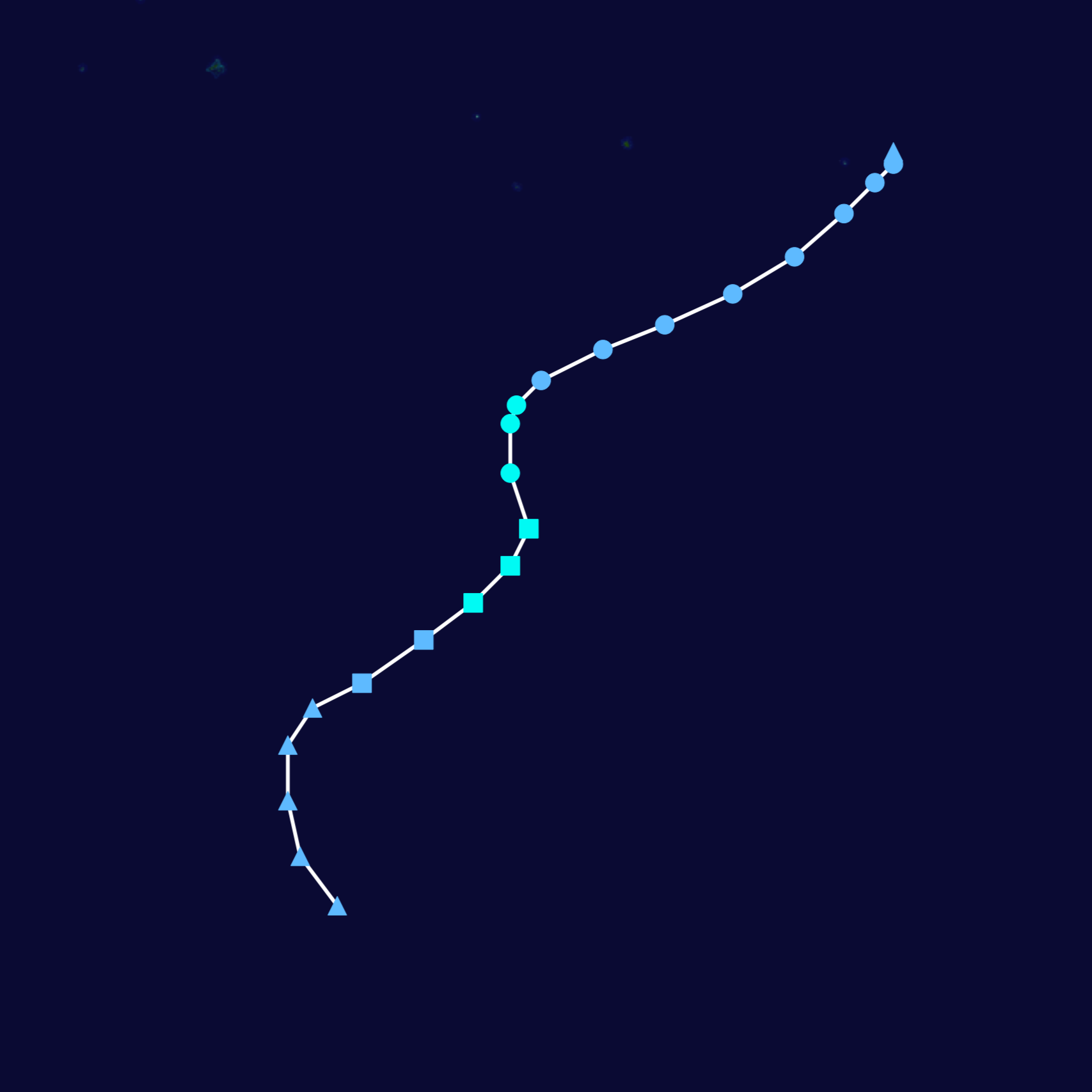
- Duration: March 31 – April 4
- Peak intensity: 70 km/h (45 mph) (10-min); 1006 hPa (mbar)

In Gary Pagett's April 2002 monthly tropical cyclone summary, he noted a possible tropical cyclone over the southeast Pacific that displayed features of a tropical or subtropical cyclone. Operationally, the Tropical Cyclone Warning Center in Wellington, New Zealand only issued gale warnings on the system as it was not assessed to have been tropical or subtropical. The system was later studied by Dr. Karl Hoarau of Cergy-Pontoise University in France and is believed to have been a tropical storm. At the end of March, an upper-level trough associated with a cold front developed over the southeast Pacific Ocean. By March 31, a low-level circulation had developed roughly 600 km (370 mi) east of the Pitcairn Islands. Despite moderate wind shear, the system intensified and became a tropical depression early on April 1. Owing to a subtropical ridge to the north, the depression tracked west-southwestward into an area of decreased shear. Subsequently, the system was able to intensify into a tropical storm by the evening of April 2. Though the storm remained shear, throughout April 3 with convection remaining within half a degree of the center of circulation. During the evening hours, an eye-like feature appeared on satellite imagery, and the system simultaneously was estimated to have reached again a peak intensity, but now as a subtropical storm. Hours later, dry air became entrained in the storm's circulation and caused it to rapidly weaken to a subtropical depression. By the afternoon of April 4, the low had become fully exposed and the system was no longer classified a subtropical or tropical cyclone.

=== Other systems ===
In addition to the storms listed above, the FMS monitored several weak tropical depressions and a tropical disturbance throughout the season. On December 8, Tropical Depression 02F developed near Fiji. Tracking westward, the system attained a peak intensity of 45 km/h (28 mph) with a minimum pressure of 1000 mbar (hPa; 29.53 inHg) before weakening took place. By December 10, the system transitioned into an extratropical cyclone. Over the following several days, the remnants of the depression drifted southeastward and were last noted on December 15 to the southeast of Fiji. On January 15, Tropical Depression 06F formed about 835 km (519 mi) west-northwest of Nouméa, New Caledonia. Embedded within a monsoon trough, the system tracked generally eastward and attained peak winds of 65 km/h (40 mph). The strongest winds were located well to the south of the system in a peripheral band. By January 16, the system began weakening as it interacted with a frontal system near New Caledonia before completely losing its identity later that day. On January 20, a large tropical depression, designated 07F, formed about 325 km (202 mi) northwest of Fiji. A monsoonal system, the depression failed to organize a definite center and relocated several times throughout its existence. Between January 21 and 24, gale warnings were issued in association with the cyclone due to a strong pressure gradient between it and an anticyclone to the south. Tracking generally southwestward, the system slowly deepened, attaining a minimum pressure of 997 mbar (hPa; 29.44 inHg) early on January 27 before the FMS discontinued advisories on the storm.

On February 17, a tropical depression formed about 555 km (345 mi) northeast of Fiji and tracked southward. A strong convergence east of the depression produced an area of 65–75 km/h (40–47 mph) winds with gusts to 95–110 km/h (59–68 mph). The system was last noted on February 18 well to the southeast of Fiji. On February 26, Tropical Disturbance 11F formed 695 km (432 mi) north of Nouméa, New Caledonia. A weak system, having winds no more than 30 km/h (19 mph), it remained nearly stationary for about a day before the FMS discontinued advisories on the disturbance. Tropical Depression 14F formed on March 20 about 120 km (75 mi) southeast of Pago Pago, American Samoa. Initially the system was quasi-stationary; however, it was relocated the following day due to its broad size. The depression subsequently drifted west-southwestward and was last noted on March 23 when it was located approximately 835 km (519 mi) south-southeast of Fiji. Throughout its existence, gale warnings were issued along the periphery of the system due to a pressure gradient between the cyclone and an area of high pressure northeast of New Zealand. On April 1, Tropical Depression 15F formed well to the northwest of New Caledonia. The depression drifted east-southeast before dissipating the following day. The last cyclone of the season, Tropical Depression 16F, formed on April 17 about 595 km (370 mi) north-northeast of Port Vila, Vanuatu. After relocating substantially to the south, the depression moved slowly in the same general area for several days before dissipating on April 22. For unknown reasons, the numbering for the 2001–02 season was used for the first system of the 2002–03 season, Tropical Depression 17F, which formed on July 3.

In addition to the systems officially monitored by the FMS, a possible subtropical cyclone developed in late-March. On March 21, an area of low pressure developed approximately 465 km (289 mi) northwest of French Polynesia. Aided by favorable diffluence aloft, deep convection developed over the center of the system, prompting the JTWC to issue a TCFA on March 22. However, several hours later, increasing wind shear displaced the convection from the center of circulation and redevelopment was deemed unlikely as the cyclone moved over cooler waters.

== Season effects ==
This is a table of all of the storms that have formed in the 2001–02 South Pacific cyclone season. It includes their duration, names, landfall(s)–denoted by bold location names – damages, and death totals. Damage and deaths include totals while the storm was extratropical, a wave, or a low, and all of the damage figures are in 2002 USD.

| Name | Dates | Peak intensity | | | Areas affected | Damage (USD) | Deaths | Ref(s). |
| Name | Dates | Category | Wind speed | Pressure | Areas affected | Damage (USD) | Deaths | Ref(s). |
|---|---|---|---|---|---|---|---|---|
| Trina | November 29 – December 3 | Category 1 tropical cyclone | 65 km/h (40 mph) | 995 hPa (29.38 inHg) | Cook Islands, French Polynesia | $52,000 | 0 | |
| 02F | December 8–15 | Tropical depression | 55 km/h (34 mph) | 1,000 hPa (29.53 inHg) | Fiji | None | 0 | |
| Waka | December 19 – January 2 | Category 4 severe tropical cyclone | 185 km/h (115 mph) | 930 hPa (27.46 inHg) | Wallis and Futuna, Niue, Tonga, New Zealand | $51.3 million | 1 | |
| Vicky | December 22–26 | Category 1 tropical cyclone | 65 km/h (40 mph) | 995 hPa (29.38 inHg) | None | None | 0 | |
| 05F | December 31 – January 6 | Tropical depression | 65 km/h (40 mph) | 1,000 hPa (29.53 inHg) | Solomon Islands | None | 0 | |
| 06F | January 15–16 | Tropical depression | 65 km/h (40 mph) | 1,000 hPa (29.53 inHg) | New Caledonia | None | 0 | |
| 07F | January 20–27 | Tropical depression | 65 km/h (40 mph) | 997 hPa (29.44 inHg) | Vanuatu, New Caledonia | None | 0 | |
| Claudia | February 12–14 | Category 3 severe tropical cyclone | 120 km/h (75 mph) | 965 hPa (28.50 inHg) | None | None | 0 | |
| 09F | February 17–18 | Tropical depression | 75 km/h (47 mph) | 997 hPa (29.44 inHg) | Fiji | None | 0 | |
| 10F | February 23–26 | Tropical depression | 65 km/h (40 mph) | 1,000 hPa (29.53 inHg) | None | None | 0 | |
| 11F | February 26–27 | Tropical disturbance | 30 km/h (19 mph) | 1,002 hPa (29.59 inHg) | None | None | 0 | |
| Des | March 5–7 | Category 2 tropical cyclone | 95 km/h (59 mph) | 985 hPa (29.09 inHg) | New Caledonia | None | 0 | |
| 13F | March 13–16 | Tropical depression | 65 km/h (40 mph) | 1,000 hPa (29.53 inHg) | None | None | 0 | |
| 14F | March 20–23 | Tropical depression | 65 km/h (40 mph) | 1,002 hPa (29.59 inHg) | None | None | 0 | |
| Unnamed | March 31– April 4 | Category 1 tropical cyclone | 69 km/h (43 mph) | 1,006 hPa (29.71 inHg) | None | None | 0 | |
| 15F | April 1–2 | Tropical depression | Not specified | 1,002 hPa (29.59 inHg) | None | None | 0 | |
| 16F | April 17–22 | Tropical depression | Not specified | 1,002 hPa (29.59 inHg) | None | None | 0 | |
Season aggregates
| 17 systems | November 16 – April 23 | | 185 km/h (115 mph) | 930 hPa (27.46 inHg) | | >$51.4 million | 1 | |

== See also ==
- List of Southern Hemisphere tropical cyclone seasons
- Atlantic hurricane seasons: 2001, 2002
- Pacific hurricane seasons: 2001, 2002
- Pacific typhoon seasons: 2001, 2002
- North Indian Ocean cyclone seasons: 2001, 2002
