= Hurricane Ophelia (2011) =

Category 4 Atlantic hurricane in 2011

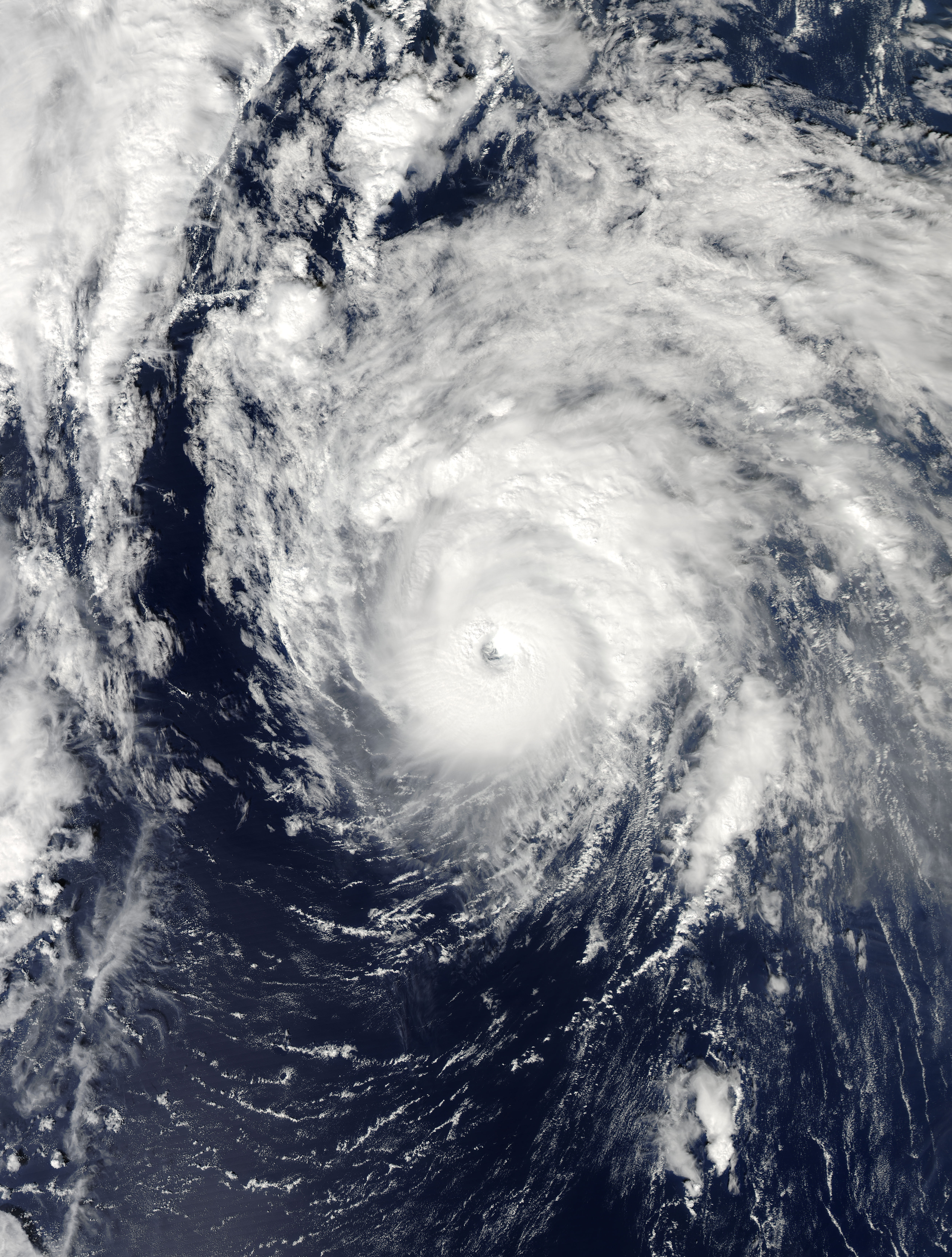
- Ophelia at peak intensity as a Category 4 hurricane on October 1

Meteorological history
- Formed: September 20, 2011
- Extratropical: October 3, 2011
- Dissipated: October 7, 2011

Category 4 major hurricane
- 1-minute sustained (SSHWS/NWS)
- Highest winds: 140 mph (220 km/h)
- Lowest pressure: 940 mbar (hPa); 27.76 inHg

Overall effects
- Fatalities: None
- Damage: Minimal
- Areas affected: Leeward Islands, Bermuda, Newfoundland
- IBTrACS
- Part of the 2011 Atlantic hurricane season

Hurricane Ophelia was the most intense hurricane of the 2011 Atlantic hurricane season. The seventeenth tropical cyclone, sixteenth tropical storm, fifth hurricane, and third major hurricane, Ophelia originated in a tropical wave in the central Atlantic, forming approximately midway between the Cape Verde Islands and the Lesser Antilles on September 17. Tracking generally west-northwestward, Ophelia was upgraded to a tropical storm on September 21, and reached an initial peak of 65 mph (105 km/h) on September 22. As the storm entered a region of higher wind shear it began to weaken, and was subsequently downgraded to a remnant low on September 25. The following day, however, the remnants of the system began to reorganize as wind shear lessened, and on September 27, the National Hurricane Center once again began advisories on the system. Moving northward, Ophelia regained tropical storm status early on September 28, and rapidly deepened to attain its peak intensity with maximum sustained winds of 140 mph (230 km/h) several days later. The system weakened as it entered cooler sea surface temperatures and began a gradual transition to an extratropical cyclone, a process it completed by October 3.

Following the development of Ophelia, numerous storm watches and warnings were issued for the northeastern Caribbean Islands. Residents were urged to prepare for strong winds and substantial flooding. As the system made its closest approach, Ophelia produced several inches of rainfall, leading to mudslides and several road rescues. While light rain totals and gusty winds below tropical storm force were recorded on the island of Bermuda, storm surge and dangerous rip currents along the coast caused minimal damage. In Newfoundland, heavy rainfall contributed to floods that destroyed roads and many buildings. Following Ophelia's transition into an extratropical cyclone, residents across Europe were urged to prepare for strong winds in excess of 75 mph (121 km/h) in some locations, as well as rainfall accumulations up to 4 in (100 mm). In northern Ireland, a combination of moisture and significantly cooler weather produced several inches of snow across the region, cutting electricity to hundreds. Overall, there were no deaths reported in association with Ophelia, and damage was minimal.

== Meteorological history ==
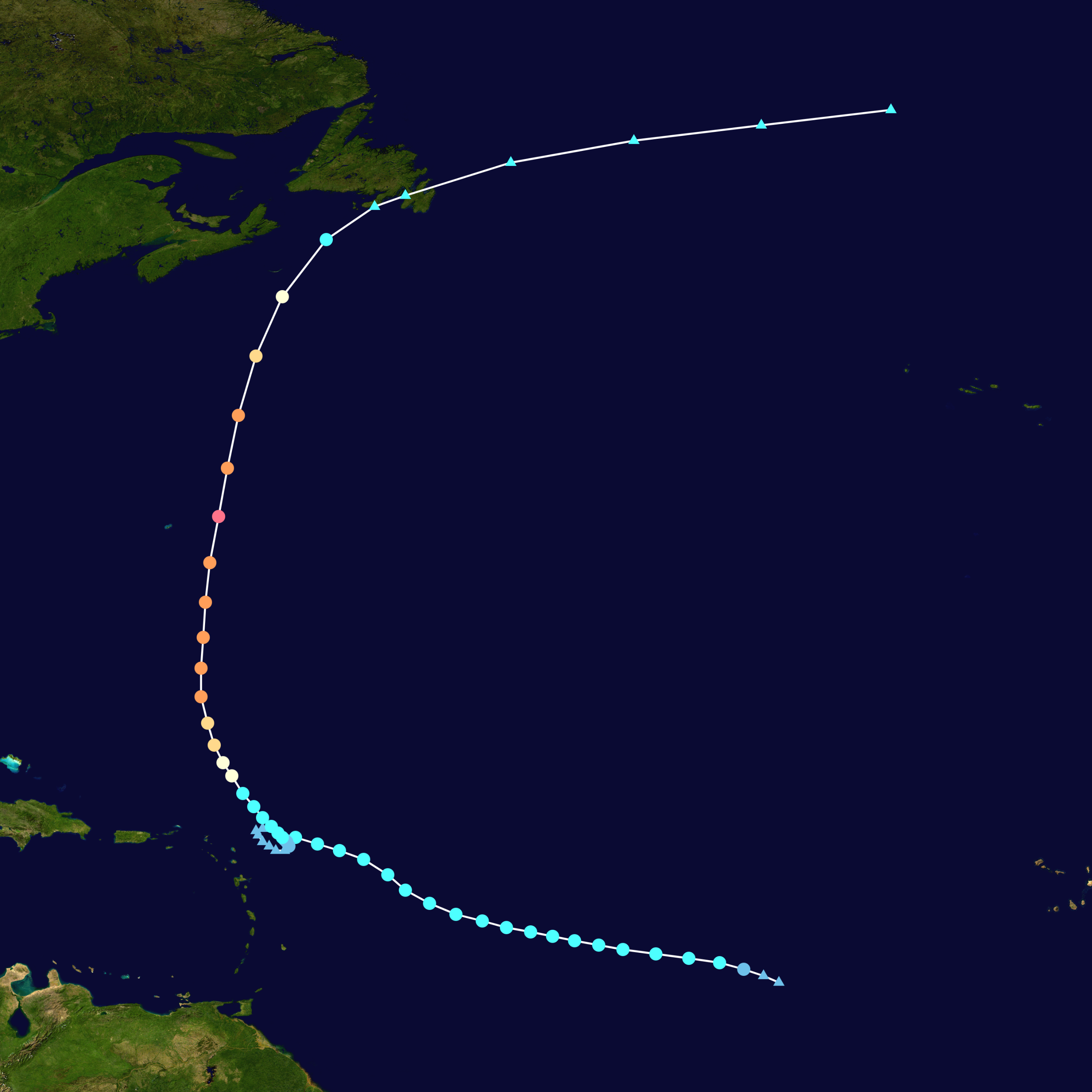
Map plotting the storm's track and intensity, according to the Saffir–Simpson scale Map key Saffir–Simpson scale Tropical depression (≤38 mph, ≤62 km/h) Tropical storm (39–73 mph, 63–118 km/h) Category 1 (74–95 mph, 119–153 km/h) Category 2 (96–110 mph, 154–177 km/h) Category 3 (111–129 mph, 178–208 km/h) Category 4 (130–156 mph, 209–251 km/h) Category 5 (≥157 mph, ≥252 km/h) Unknown Storm type Tropical cyclone Subtropical cyclone Extratropical cyclone, remnant low, tropical disturbance, or monsoon depression

The formation of Hurricane Ophelia is attributed in part to a low-latitude tropical wave that emerged off the western coast of Africa in mid-September. As the wave tracked westward, it began to interact with the Intertropical Convergence Zone (ITCZ), and was subsequently introduced with a low chance of tropical development in the National Hurricane Center's (NHC) 48-hour Tropical Weather Outlook. Though atmospheric wind shear was only marginally favorable, the cloud pattern organized, and a surface low-pressure area developed in association with the disturbance. Deep shower and thunderstorm activity continued to fire as the disturbance moved in a general westward motion, and it was assessed with a high chance of development by early on September 19. Following satellite trends and data from the Advanced Scatterometer, the disturbance was upgraded to a tropical depression at 1800 UTC the following day, while positioned roughly 1,300 mi (2,100 km) east of the Lesser Antilles, and to a tropical storm six hours later.

Tropical Storm Ophelia near the Lesser Antilles on September 28

Tropical Storm Ophelia continued to intensify as it moved west-northwest. Curved convective bands became prominent in the northern semicircle of the cyclone, and deep convection developed near the center. This intensification trend was short-lived, however, as increased wind shear from a nearby upper-level low caused the low-level center to become partially exposed. Despite the poor presentation on satellite imagery, data from a nearby buoy revealed that the system was stronger than previously thought, with maximum sustained winds of 65 mph (105 km/h) on September 22. As the upper-level low moved closer to Ophelia, inducing increasingly unfavorable shear on the storm, it caused the low-pressure area to become completely void of thunderstorms. While deep convection waned significantly early on September 23, it made a comeback by that afternoon, and an Air Force Reserve reconnaissance aircraft found 60 mph (97 km/h) winds in the system, much stronger than the intensity of 45 mph (72 km/h) the system was assessed with before the flight. This intensity did not maintain long as the cloud pattern once again became disorganized. The low-level center became exposed once again during the pre-dawn hours of September 25, and without the return of organized shower and thunderstorm activity, led to the NHC declaring Ophelia as a remnant area of low pressure, while situated 180 mi (290 km) east of the northern Leeward Islands.

Though the low-level center dissipated later that afternoon, a well-defined mid-level center lingered. The National Hurricane Center initially assessed the remnants of Ophelia with a low chance of regeneration as deep convection fired in association with the low, but these odds were subsequently increased to a medium chance by the afternoon hours of September 26. A new low-level circulation developed within the well-organized cloud mass, and the system was once again given a high chance of tropical cyclone formation that evening. Following an Air Force Reserve reconnaissance flight into the system, the disturbance was upgraded to Tropical Depression Ophelia at 1200 UTC on September 27, and was once again upgraded to a tropical storm with maximum sustained winds of 45 mph (72 km/h) 18 hours later. As the cyclone reached the western periphery of the subtropical ridge positioned across the central Atlantic, it began to curve northward and intensify once again. Deep convection blossomed atop the center late on September 28, and microwave imagery depicted the development of an eye. Upper-level outflow expanded in all four quadrants of the cyclone by the afternoon hours of September 29, and satellite intensity estimates continued to rise, prompting the NHC to upgrade Ophelia to a Category 1 hurricane by 1800 UTC that day.

An unexpected period of rapid deepening began early on September 30 as a well-defined eye became clearly visible on satellite imagery. Ophelia intensified into a Category 2 hurricane with winds of 100 mph (160 km/h) by 0600 UTC and became the season's third major hurricane—a Category 3 or higher on the Saffir–Simpson hurricane scale—twelve hours later. Cloud tops continued to cool in the system's eyewall late on October 1, with cloud tops in the eye of the system warming. Ophelia intensified into a Category 4 hurricane at 0000 UTC on October 2 and simultaneously attained its peak intensity with maximum sustained winds of 140 mph (230 km/h) and a minimum barometric pressure of 940 mbar (940 hPa; 28 inHg) as it passed east of Bermuda. Weakening ensued the following day as the hurricane entered cooler sea surface temperatures and an environment characterized by significantly more stable air. Ophelia weakened below major hurricane intensity by 1800 UTC and became a tropical storm for the final time by 0600 UTC on October 3. The system lost its tropical characteristics and was subsequently declared an extratropical cyclone four hours later while positioned just southwest of Newfoundland. The extratropical low was absorbed by a larger weather system by the afternoon hours of the following day.

== Preparations and impact ==
Hurricane Ophelia approaching Newfoundland on October 2

Though the center of Ophelia remained 205 mi (330 km) east of the Lesser Antilles, its outer bands produced heavy rains across the region. In Dominica, more than 4 in (100 mm) of rain fell over parts of the country, triggering flooding along several rivers. Nearly 1,600 people were stranded and many cars were washed away by the flooding, while landslides severed access to several communities. Several businesses and schools were closed in preparation of the storm. As Ophelia made its closest approach to the region, heavy rainfall submerged Canefield Airport, and numerous roads, buildings and farms were damaged, leaving residents trapped. Gusty winds, reaching 37 mph (60 km/h) at times, and scattered thunderstorms affected portions of Guadeloupe.

Following Ophelia's upgrade to hurricane status on September 29, the Bermuda Weather Service (BWS) issued a tropical storm watch for the entirety of the island. Over the following days, the threat of damaging winds gradually decreased as the storm's forecast track took it far enough east of the territory to spare the region of a direct hit. Correspondingly, the BWS discontinued the watch on the evening of October 1. Four flights from the United States to Bermuda were canceled due to stormy conditions. Along the coast, the Department of Parks raised high surf warnings for the entire south shore and temporarily closed Horseshoe Beach. Additionally, a few local events were postponed. Passing roughly 140 mi (230 km) east of Bermuda, the outer bands of Ophelia produced 0.38 in (9.7 mm) of rain and wind gusts up to 35 mph (56 km/h) across the islands.

On October 1, Environment Canada issued a tropical storm watch for the Avalon Peninsula. Throughout Newfoundland, residents were warned of heavy rains approaching 4 in (100 mm). Striking the region just over a year after Hurricane Igor, Ophelia revealed that repairs made in the wake of the previous hurricane were occasionally inadequate. Six roads on the Burin and Bonavista peninsulas were shut down during the storm; two of the works sustained significant damage. Several culverts installed after Igor were washed away by Ophelia.

While Ophelia was still impacting Newfoundland, forecasters in the United Kingdom warned residents that the remnants of the storm would bring unsettled weather to the nation within a few days. In the midst of a record-breaking heat wave, with temperatures reaching an all-time monthly record high of 86 °F (30 °C), the storm was expected to bring much cooler weather across the region. Strong winds and heavy rains were also anticipated, leading to the cancellation of ferry services. Plummeting temperatures in association with the remnants of the storm were expected to produce snowfall across the United Kingdom as well. In County Donegal the first snows of the season fell, leaving hundreds of residents without electricity.

== See also ==
- Weather of 2011
- Tropical cyclones in 2011
- Timeline of the 2011 Atlantic hurricane season
- Other storms with the same name
- List of Bermuda hurricanes
- List of Category 4 Atlantic hurricanes
- Hurricane Erin (2001)
- Hurricane Gonzalo
- Hurricane Teddy
