= Tropical Storm Lee (2011) =

Atlantic tropical storm in 2011

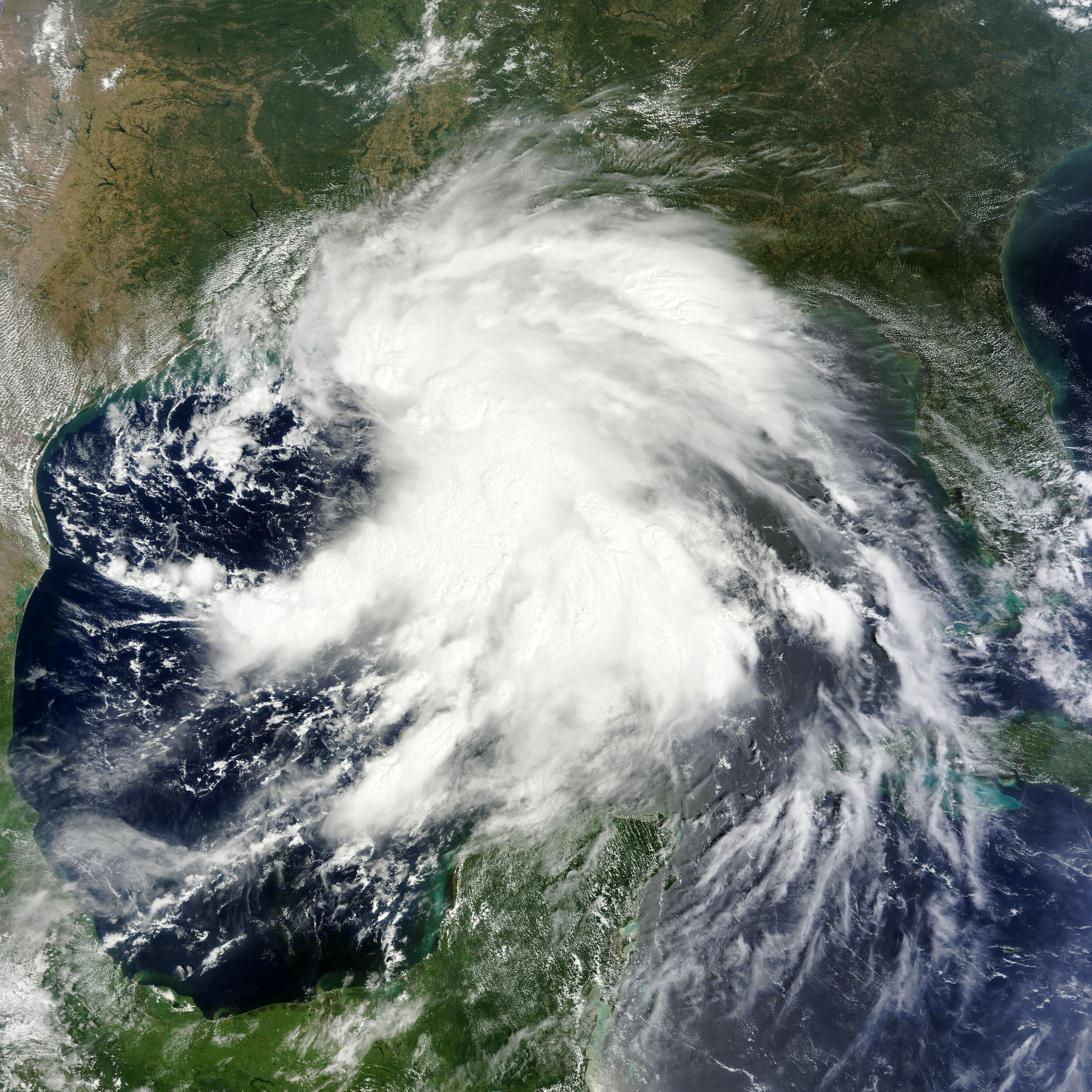
- Tropical Storm Lee near peak intensity on September 2

Meteorological history
- Formed: September 2, 2011
- Subtropical: September 3, 2011
- Extratropical: September 5, 2011
- Dissipated: September 7, 2011

Tropical storm
- 1-minute sustained (SSHWS/NWS)
- Highest winds: 60 mph (95 km/h)
- Lowest pressure: 986 mbar (hPa); 29.12 inHg

Overall effects
- Fatalities: 18 total
- Damage: $2.8 billion (2011 USD)
- Areas affected: United States Gulf Coast and Eastern United States
- IBTrACS /
- Part of the 2011 Atlantic hurricane season

Tropical Storm Lee was the thirteenth named storm and fifteenth system overall of the 2011 Atlantic hurricane season, developing from a broad tropical disturbance over the Gulf on September 2. It was designated as Tropical Storm Lee the next day. Prior to 2020, when Marco formed on August 22, Lee was tied with 2005's Maria as the earliest-forming 13th Atlantic tropical storm. The system was unusually large, and due to drifting, Lee brought flash flooding to the Gulf Coast. Flooding associated with the rains caused significant property damage in the areas, with drowning deaths reported in both Mississippi and Georgia. Elsewhere, the storm helped spread wildfires that destroyed homes and killed two people in Texas, and a traffic accident in Alabama resulted in one death. Rough surf offshore drowned one person in each of these states. After becoming extratropical, Lee caused historic flooding in Pennsylvania, New York, and Canada, mainly Quebec and Ontario.

Lee was the first subtropical or tropical storm to make landfall in Louisiana since Hurricane Gustav in 2008. Its total damage was estimated to be around $2.8 billion.

== Meteorological history ==
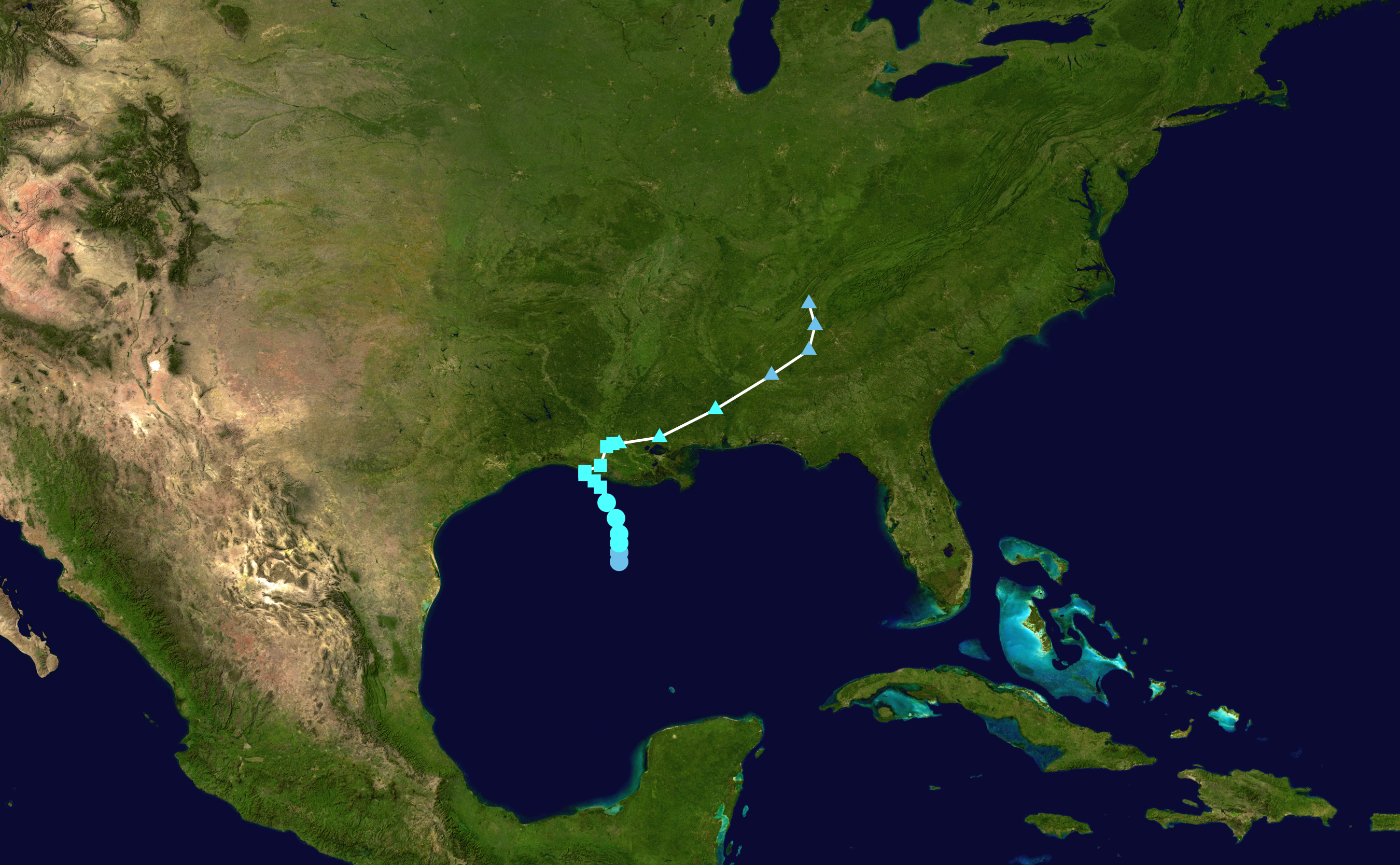
Map plotting the storm's track and intensity, according to the Saffir–Simpson scale Map key Saffir–Simpson scale Tropical depression (≤38 mph, ≤62 km/h) Tropical storm (39–73 mph, 63–118 km/h) Category 1 (74–95 mph, 119–153 km/h) Category 2 (96–110 mph, 154–177 km/h) Category 3 (111–129 mph, 178–208 km/h) Category 4 (130–156 mph, 209–251 km/h) Category 5 (≥157 mph, ≥252 km/h) Unknown Storm type Tropical cyclone Subtropical cyclone Extratropical cyclone, remnant low, tropical disturbance, or monsoon depression

In late August 2011, much of the western Caribbean came under the influence of abundant tropical moisture. Combined with favorable upper diffluence, the moisture allowed for a perpetual area of disturbed weather to form; this, in return, contributed to the genesis of a weak tropical wave, or an elongated low-pressure feature at the lower levels of the atmosphere. The wave initiated a more-or-less westward, then west-northwestward drift across the Yucatán Peninsula toward the Gulf of Mexico, although it remained largely disorganized while doing so. After arriving in the gulf on August 31, the system failed to develop much under initially high wind shear; however, the National Hurricane Center forecast some potential for the formation of a tropical cyclone in a day or two. Strong convection increased mainly to its east during the next day, and by 23:00 UTC, data from a reconnaissance aircraft confirmed the presence of a closed circulation center. At this point, the system was considered sufficiently organized to be upgraded to a tropical depression, with its center located 255 mi (360 km) to the southwest of the mouth of the Mississippi River.

Situated within an area of weak steering currents, the depression remained nearly stationary during the initial stages of its existence. It exhibited a poor organization at the time; the circulation remained elongated, with a broad center of light winds removed from the sheared convective mass. Over the course of September 2 the convection began to deepen over its eastern portion, which later translated into an increase in the winds. Based on this increase in strength, the depression was upgraded to Tropical Storm Lee at 18:00 UTC. Lee meandered erratically north-northwestward to northward for the rest of the day, and with a small upper low advecting dry air into the circulation any deep convection over its western semicircle remained scarce during that time. By September 3, the storm sustained a large radius of maximum winds within the still elongated circulation; this unusual structure to purely tropical cyclones, combined with an overall hybrid appearance on satellite images, suggested Lee transitioned into a subtropical storm as it approached the Louisiana coast, similar to the transition of Tropical Storm Allison in 2001.

The extratropical remnant of Tropical Storm Lee over the Eastern US, on September 6: Hurricane Katia can be seen to the right, as can the precursor of Hurricane Nate to the lower left

Stalling off the coast of Louisiana, the storm's windfield continued to expand and increase in strength, though two separate low-level centers became evident within the exceedingly large circulation later that day. Due to a large portion of circulation remaining over the warm waters of the Gulf of Mexico, Lee weakened more slowly than a typical tropical cyclone would as it moves inland. Lee finally moved inland over south-central Louisiana on the morning of September 4 as a subtropical storm with winds of 45 mph (75 km/h). By that evening, Lee had weakened to a tropical depression in operational estimates, due to land interaction and continental air being advected into the system. Lee had begun to interact with a strong upper-level trough (which would subsequently spawn Hurricane Nate in the Bay of Campeche a few days later) in the Mississippi Valley as it continued to move off to the east-northeast. It was designated an extratropical low adjacent to the trough on the morning of September 5, while maintaining tropical storm-force winds according to post-analysis. The extratropical remnants weakened further on September 6, as it entered northwestern Georgia. Early on September 7, at 00:00 UTC, the remnant low of Lee dissipated. However, the storm's mid-level circulation persisted, developing a new triple-point low along its occluded front, which quickly dominated the storm. For the next several days, the new low made a large, counterclockwise loop over a portion of the Eastern United States, before dissipating on September 11, over western Tennessee.

== Preparations and impact ==
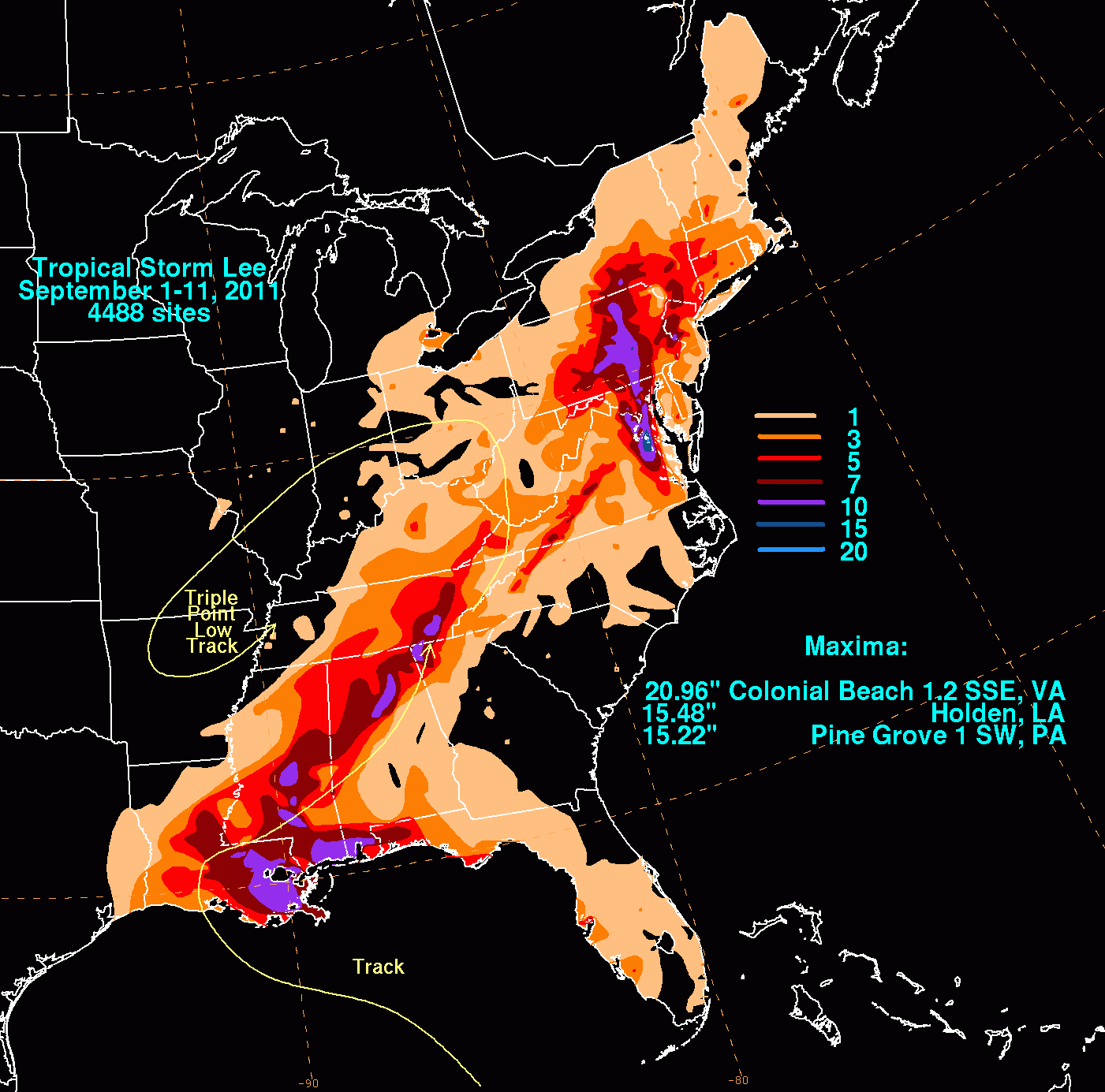
Rainfall totals from Lee across the Eastern and Southeastern United States

In advance of the storm, oil companies in the Gulf of Mexico ordered the evacuation of employees from offshore platforms as a safety precaution. At least 169 of the 617 manned production platforms, as well as 16 of 62 drilling rigs, were evacuated in the area, reducing daily production by about 660,000 oil barrels and 1.7 billion cu ft of gas. A tropical storm warning was posted from Pascagoula, Mississippi, westward to Sabine Pass, Texas, in response to Lee. Early on September 3, the warning was extended to the Alabama–Florida border. In addition, a tropical storm watch was in place from the border eastward to Destin, Florida.

=== Louisiana ===
Mayor Mitch Landrieu declared a state of emergency for all of New Orleans; officials accordingly ordered the closure of floodgates and the preparation of rescue boats across the city. In Grand Isle, many residents headed out of town after officials issued voluntary evacuations, and boat owners secured their vessels. Additionally, the Louisiana parishes of Terrebonne and Lafourche distributed sandbags at several coastal locations after specialists forecast torrential rainfall and flash flood warnings were issued.

Due to its unusually slow and erratic motion, Lee produced flooding rains across much of southern Louisiana. Headwinds from Lee fanned a large fire north in Natchitoches Parish; about 400 acres of land, including 10 adjacent homes and several buildings, were set ablaze and subsequently destroyed. High winds also produced a storm surge that submerged parts of Slidell by up to 4 ft (1.2 m), inundating several homes. About 38,000 residences in New Orleans were left without power at one point, though only minor flooding occurred around the city. Low-lying areas in adjacent parishes reported more significant effects; street flooding occurred in Plaquemines and St. Bernard Parishes, and floodwaters in Jefferson Parish prompted residents to evacuate. Moving ashore in the latter parish near Lafitte, the storm caused heavy rainfall, leaving roughly 60 percent of the area inundated.

=== Mississippi ===
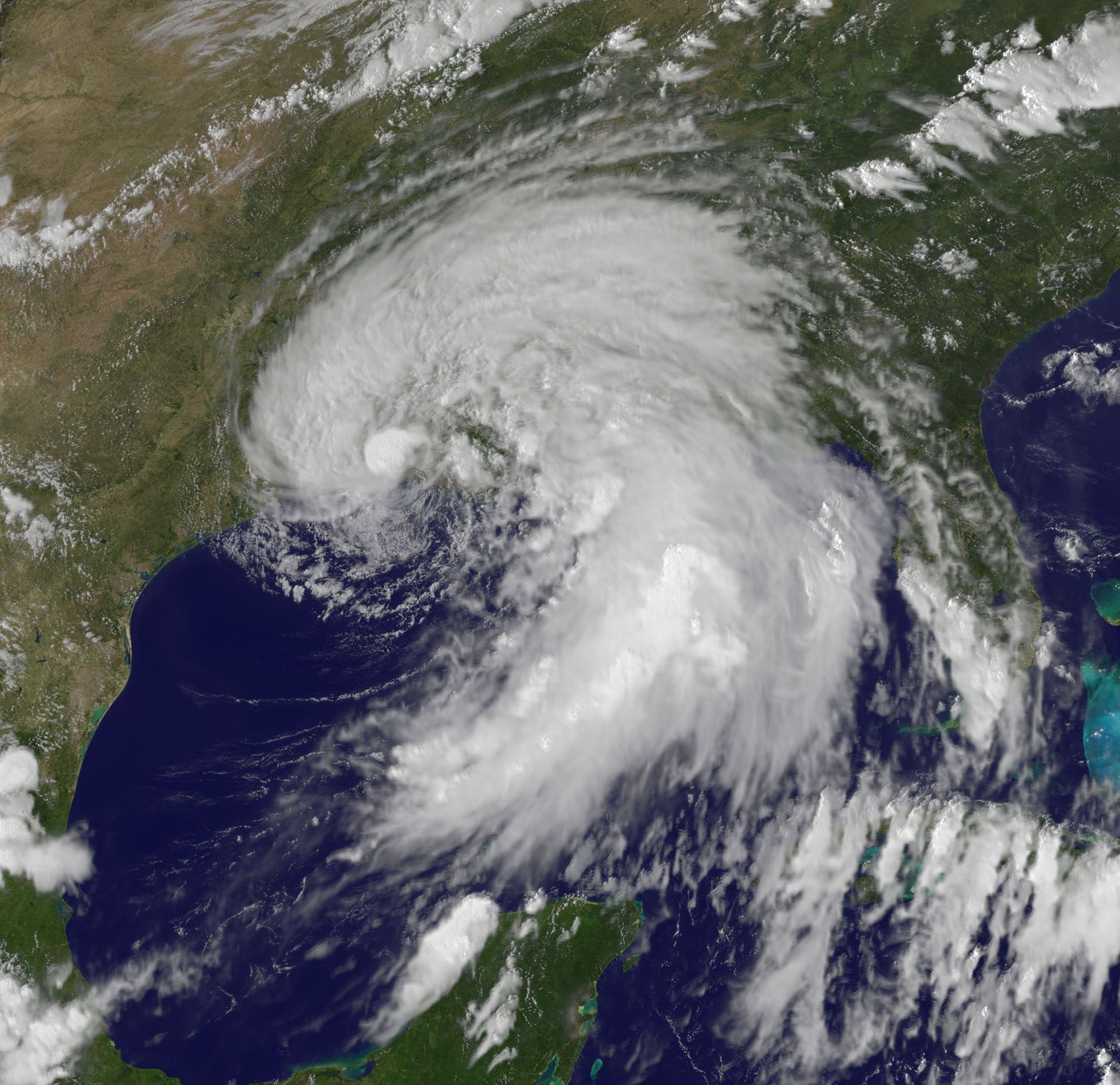
Subtropical Storm Lee prior to making landfall on September 3

In light of heavy rainfall forecast for coastal areas, much of southern Mississippi was under a flash flood watch until the passage of the storm. A state of emergency was ordered for Jackson County; local fire stations initiated the free distribution of sandbags, and the harbor was closed off to all transient vessels. Similar preparations took place in Hancock County, where officials issued voluntary evacuations for low-lying areas. Rainfall totals in Waveland, MS measured 14.75 inches (375 mm). Gulf Islands National Seashore ordered the immediate closure of its portions of the Mississippi–Alabama barrier islands, while its present visitors were instructed to leave.

Across the southern state, prolonged inclement weather from Lee and its remnants resulted in widespread moderate and localized extensive flooding. Several roads were inundated in the coastal counties of Hancock, Jackson, and Harrison, with the latter two reporting considerable property damage due to the floods. A potent tornado touched down in northern Harrison, leaving behind demolished trailers and downed trees and power lines throughout Saucier. In Stone County, some structures including one church sustained wind damage during the storm; officials further reported the worst of the winds were also attributed to a possible tornado, which uprooted trees and severely damaged one manufactured home. Further inland, moderate street flooding also occurred in Rankin and Wilkinson counties, while more significant floods, as well as scattered power outages, took place in Hinds County. In Tishomingo County, a vehicle was caught in rushing waters while attempting to cross a flooded road; one person drowned, though its two other occupants were unharmed.

=== Alabama ===
With Lee tracking further inland, heavy precipitation up to 13 in (330 mm) fell across Alabama. At the height of the storm, about 220,000 customers reportedly lost power due to snapped electricity poles and power lines. It caused significant, albeit localized wind damage to structures across southern areas, in particular in and around Mobile and Baldwin Counties. Multiple properties sustained damage and two homes were demolished by the winds; throughout southern Mobile, dozens of downed trees caused additional disruptions. Also in the county, one person was killed in a traffic accident related to the storm. In Lillian, Baldwin, extreme winds suspected to be from a tornado ripped through suburban areas. A few homes sustained damaged in part due to uprooted trees, though no injuries were reported. Off the coast of Fort Morgan, one person drowned due to high surf. Additionally, the brisk winds blew piles of sand from local beaches onto adjacent city streets, and rough seas swept ashore numerous tarballs.

=== Texas ===
Despite bringing little rain to Texas, Lee produced gusts and rough surf along its coasts. Offshore Galveston, a man drowned after losing control of his bodyboard due to strong winds. As Lee headed north inland over the Gulf Coast, high winds were reported as fueling up to 60 separate brush fires across Texas, which was suffering from exceptional drought conditions. The largest of these occurred in Bastrop County just east of Austin, consuming roughly 34,000 acres; it forced thousands to evacuate and destroyed 1,554 homes. In Gregg County, another fire burned down a home, which resulted in the deaths of two of its occupants. The spreading fires burned nearly 118,500 acres (480 km^{2}) of land, simultaneously demolishing an estimated 700 residences in a two-day period.

=== New York ===
Flooding in Owego the day after Tropical Storm Lee, with 95% of the village under water

Heavy rain from the remnants of Lee brought flooding to the Susquehanna River valley, dropping 10-12 inches of precipitation. In the Binghamton area, record flooding was observed along the Susquehanna and Chenango Rivers. USGS river gauges recorded water levels as high as 17 ft above flood stage, topping previous record heights achieved in the Mid-Atlantic United States flood of 2006. In some areas, such as Conklin, several residents had finished rebuilding from the 2006 floods only months before Lee hit.

Most municipalities in Greater Binghamton and the Penn-York Valley saw water levels top the levees, inundating several downtown areas along the river. Many of the locations under water had not flooded since the mid-1930s, due to the construction of levees. Over 20,000 residents were forced to evacuate in Broome County, and downtown Binghamton was closed off. Residents who were downstream from the Forest Lake Dam and the Elk Lake Dam were evacuated. The village of Owego was particularly hard-hit, with 95% of the community under water. In the aftermath, several roads were closed, including Interstate 88, which was blocked by a mudslide, and NY Route 17.

Property damage far exceeded the flood of 2006, despite precautions taken in the wake of that natural disaster. Across eight counties in New York, an early tally estimated initial losses at $562.2 million. In the Triple Cities urban core, over 7,000 properties were damaged. Damages in Broome County alone were estimated to be $513 million, while in Tioga County, estimated losses were $478 million. Two deaths were blamed on the storm.

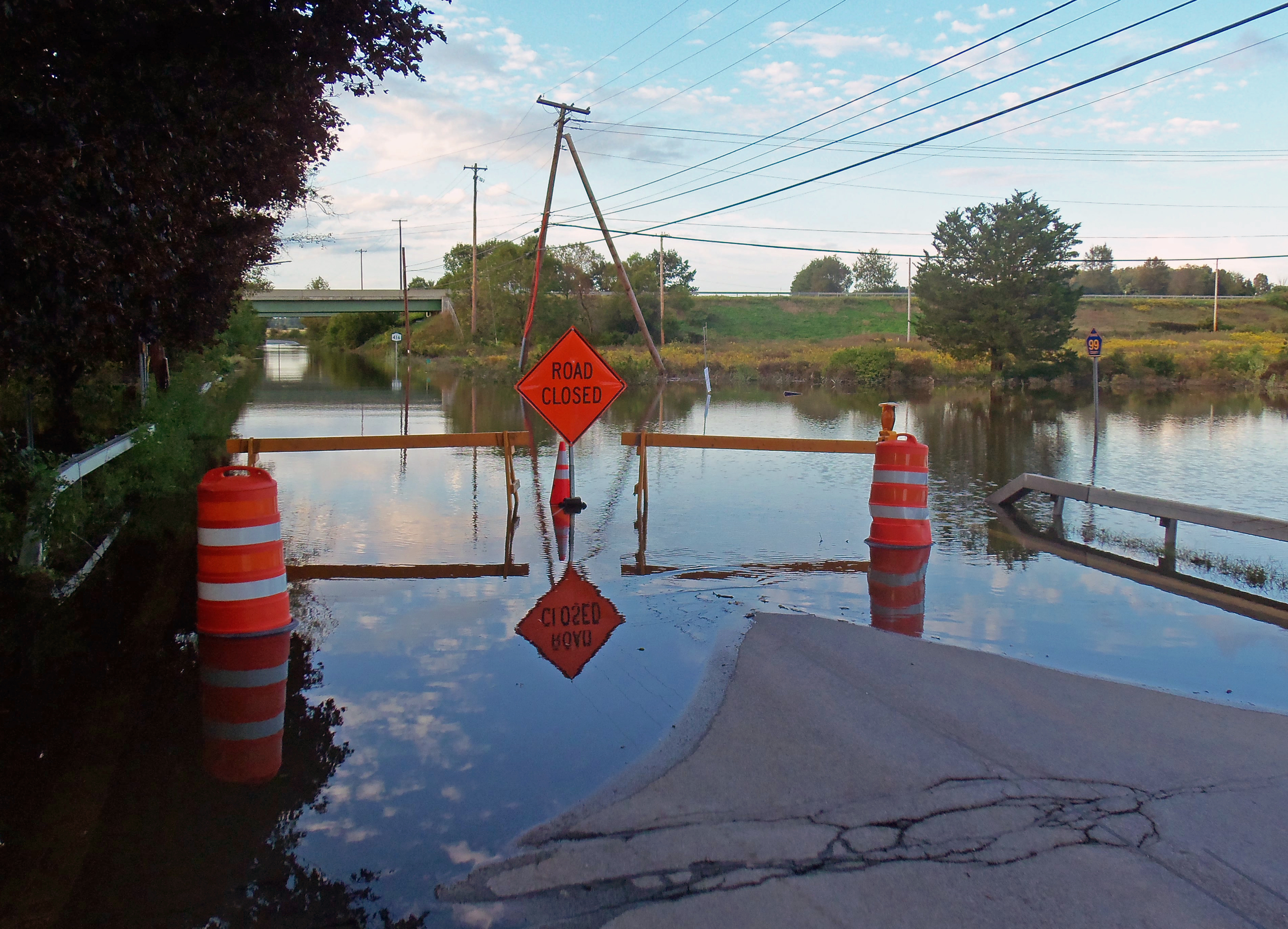
NY 416 flooded by the Wallkill River after Lee

To the east, regions already suffering the aftereffects of flooding from Hurricane Irene almost two weeks earlier had those problems aggravated by 2–4 inches (51–102 mm) of new rain on saturated ground and rivers still swollen. The Wallkill River crested at 5 feet (1.5 m) above flood stage in Ulster County, and the village of Washingtonville in Orange County to the south was isolated as it had been after Irene by the rising waters of Moodna Creek. The Orange County Government Center in Goshen, just reopened a day earlier, was closed indefinitely. Roads were closed, including exits on the New York State Thruway in the Mohawk Valley, and south of the Interstate 84 exit at Newburgh, the entire highway. Some businesses that had spent considerable time and money to reopen after Irene were once again flooded. A Petco flooded because of the tropical storm resulting in almost 100 animals drowning after a failed attempt to take them to safety.

=== Pennsylvania ===
Flooding in Wilkes-Barre led to a mandatory evacuation on September 8 of all of the areas that were affected by the 1972 Hurricane Agnes floods. The Susquehanna River reached a record high of 42.6 feet (13.0 m) in hard-hit Wilkes-Barre early on Friday, September 9. The levee system held in the northeastern Pennsylvania city. The river topped the 40.9 feet (12.5 m) level in flooding caused by Agnes. Other towns in northeastern Pennsylvania, which were not protected by a levee system, encountered historic flooding. West Pittston, Pittston, Tunkhannock, Edwardsville, Plymouth Township, and Nanticoke were just a few areas affected. About 100,000 people were displaced.

In Columbia County, the Bloomsburg Fair was forced to be cancelled for the first time in its 157-year history due to extensive damage to the fairgrounds

On the border of Northumberland and Columbia Counties, the well-known amusement park Knoebels receives flooding in the park. The flood was close to the damages of Hurricane Agnes in 1972. The park received major damage, with almost all of its employees chipping in that week to help reopen. The majority of the park opened the following week.

The prospect of flooding led Harrisburg to evacuate 10,000 people from low-lying areas of downtown. The Pennsylvania Governor's Residence was evacuated due to rising floodwaters. Lee caused the Susquehanna River to reach the third-worst flood stage in its history, and caused the Swatara Creek to reach its highest level ever. One drowning bison at the ZooAmerica wildlife park in Hershey, Pennsylvania, was shot because it could not be rescued from floodwaters. Another bison drowned before it could be rescued. The heavy rain caused a rockslide in the vicinity of the Conshohocken Curve, flooding near Belmont Avenue and a mudslide by Girard Avenue on the Schuylkill Expressway, a major artery into Philadelphia.

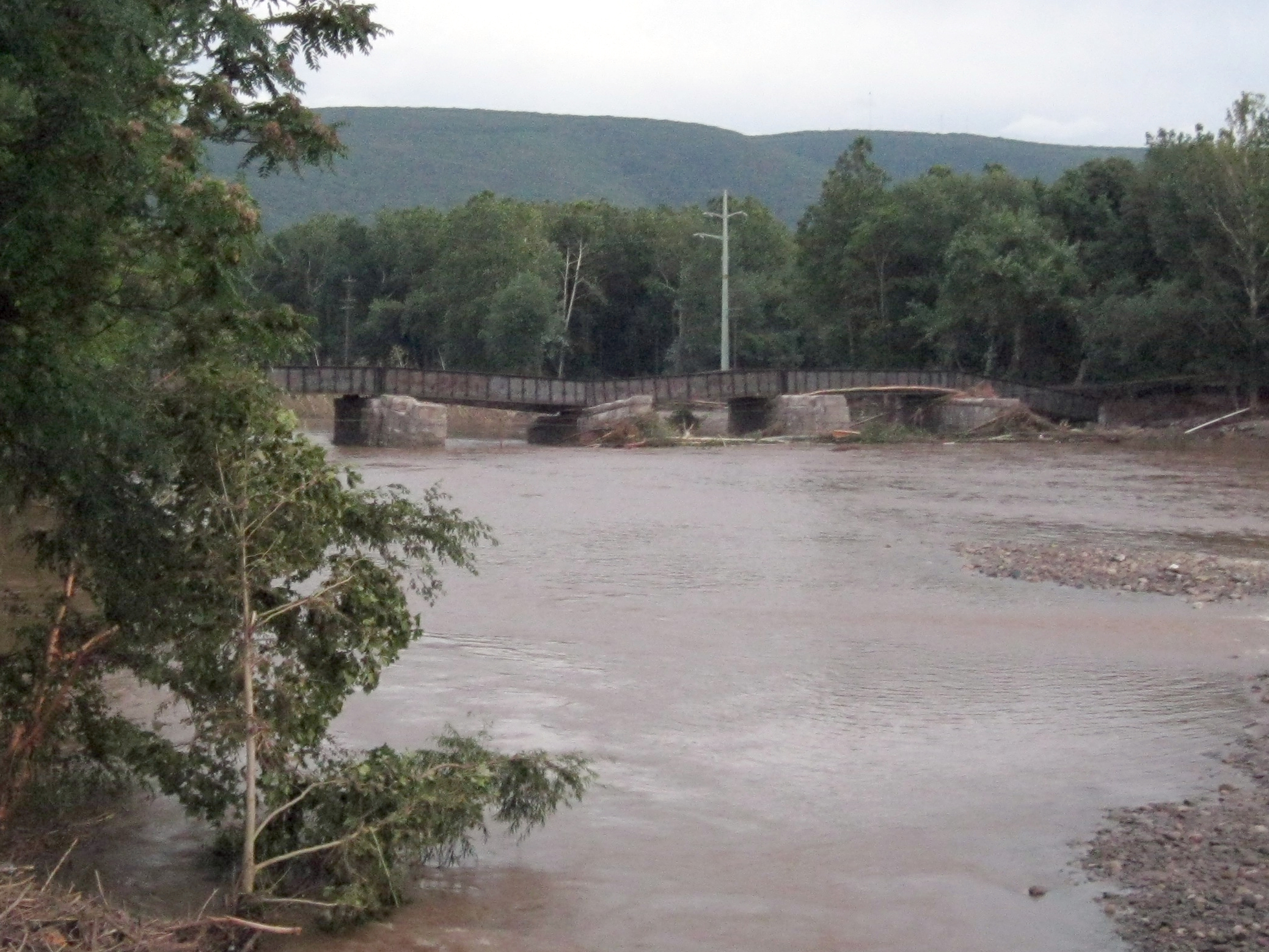
The heavily damaged Lycoming Valley Railroad bridge over Loyalsock Creek in Montoursville

In Sullivan County, the village of Sonestown was almost completely destroyed. A dam on Birch Creek in the village of Mildred collapsed, causing a large swath of damage along US Route 220.

The eastern part of Lycoming County sustained major flood damage associated with the remnants of Lee. The boroughs of Picture Rocks and Hughesville and village of Glen Mawr had to be evacuated due to flooding on Muncy Creek. A bridge at the eastern end of Pennsylvania Route 973 over Loyalsock Creek collapsed on September 8. The Lycoming Valley Railroad bridge over Loyalsock Creek in Montoursville was heavily damaged by flooding, rendering it unusable. Heavy rain from the remnants of Tropical Storm Lee raised the creek "higher than anything we've seen in recorded history", according to a county official. Replacing the destroyed PA 87 bridge and repairs to the damaged railroad bridge and Pennsylvania Route 87 were estimated to cost more than $25 million.

In Dauphin County, damage totaled about $150 million. The storm destroyed 294 buildings and damaged another 2,234. In nearby Lebanon County, 2,212 homes sustained damage. Damage in York County reached $2.9 million.

Between 7 and 15 inches (180 and 380 mm) of rain fell in northwestern Lancaster County, the worst storm to strike the area since Hurricane Agnes in 1972. The city of Lancaster received 7.76 inches (197 mm) of rain, while the boroughs of Elizabethtown and Mount Joy measured 15 inches (380 mm) of rain. The rain swollen Chiques Creek ripped the five-ton Siegrist's Mill Covered Bridge, built in 1885, off its foundation and swept the bridge downstream.

=== Washington D.C. area ===
The National Weather Service reported 7.03 inches (179 mm) of rain in three hours at Ft. Belvoir, 5.47 inches (139 mm) in the Franconia area, and 6.57 inches (167 mm) in Reston. Record rainfall resulted in the flooding of most creeks and waterways in suburban Northern Virginia, leading to four deaths, all by drowning. In Fairfax County, Virginia, VDOT estimated up to $10 million of damage to roads and bridges.

Tropical Storm Lee added to the rainfall from Hurricane Irene. The National Weather Service reported record 30-day total rainfalls in Prince George's County, Maryland, including 24.13 inches (613 mm) in Largo, 23.98 inches (609 mm) inches in Forestville, and 21.49 inches (546 mm) in Forest Heights.

== See also ==
- Other storms of the same name
- Tropical cyclones in 2011
- Timeline of the 2011 Atlantic hurricane season
- Hurricane Juan (1985) – also made landfall in Louisiana and caused a similar amount of damage
- Tropical Storm Alberto (1994) – another strong and damaging tropical storm
- Tropical Storm Allison (2001)
- Hurricane Irene (2011) – also caused flooding in the Northeast
