= 2001 hurricane season =

2001 hurricane season may refer to:

- 2001 Atlantic hurricane season
- 2001 Pacific hurricane season
- 2001 Miami Hurricanes football team
