= Lorenzo Carranco =

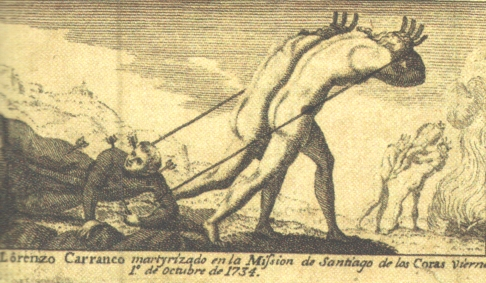
The martyrdom of Lorenzo Carranco on October 1, 1734.

Lorenzo José Carranco (1695, in Cholula, New Spain – October 2, 1734 in Misión de Santiago de los Coras Aiñiní, New Spain) was a Jesuit missionary.

== Biography ==
Born in Cholulua in 1695, Carranco studied at Puebla and made his novitiate in Tepotzotlán. In 1725, he trained at Nuestra Senora del Pilar de la Paz Airapi in La Paz to take over at Misión de Santiago de los Coras Aiñiní. Briefly, he served as a missionary at Todos los Santos, Baja California Sur. In 1727, Carranco succeeded Father Ignacio Maria Napoli at Misión de Santiago. He was killed in the Rebelión de los pericúes at the Misión de Santiago by the Pericúes in a manner similar to Nicolás Tamaral.
