= Ignacio Maria Napoli =

Ignacio Maria Napoli (died ca. 1744; also known as "Padre Procurador") was an Italian Jesuit missionary to the Baja California peninsula. In 1723, he founded the Misión de Santiago de los Coras Aiñiní, which was located southwest of Bahía las Palmas. Napoli arrived in the Cora area of Aiñiní (now known as Santiago, Baja California Sur) around 1721. Replaced by Lorenzo Carranco, he was transferred to Sinaloa or Sonora by 1726. In 1736, he was directing the Yaqui missions at Huiribis, Pótam, and Rahum.
