= 2001 Pacific hurricane season =

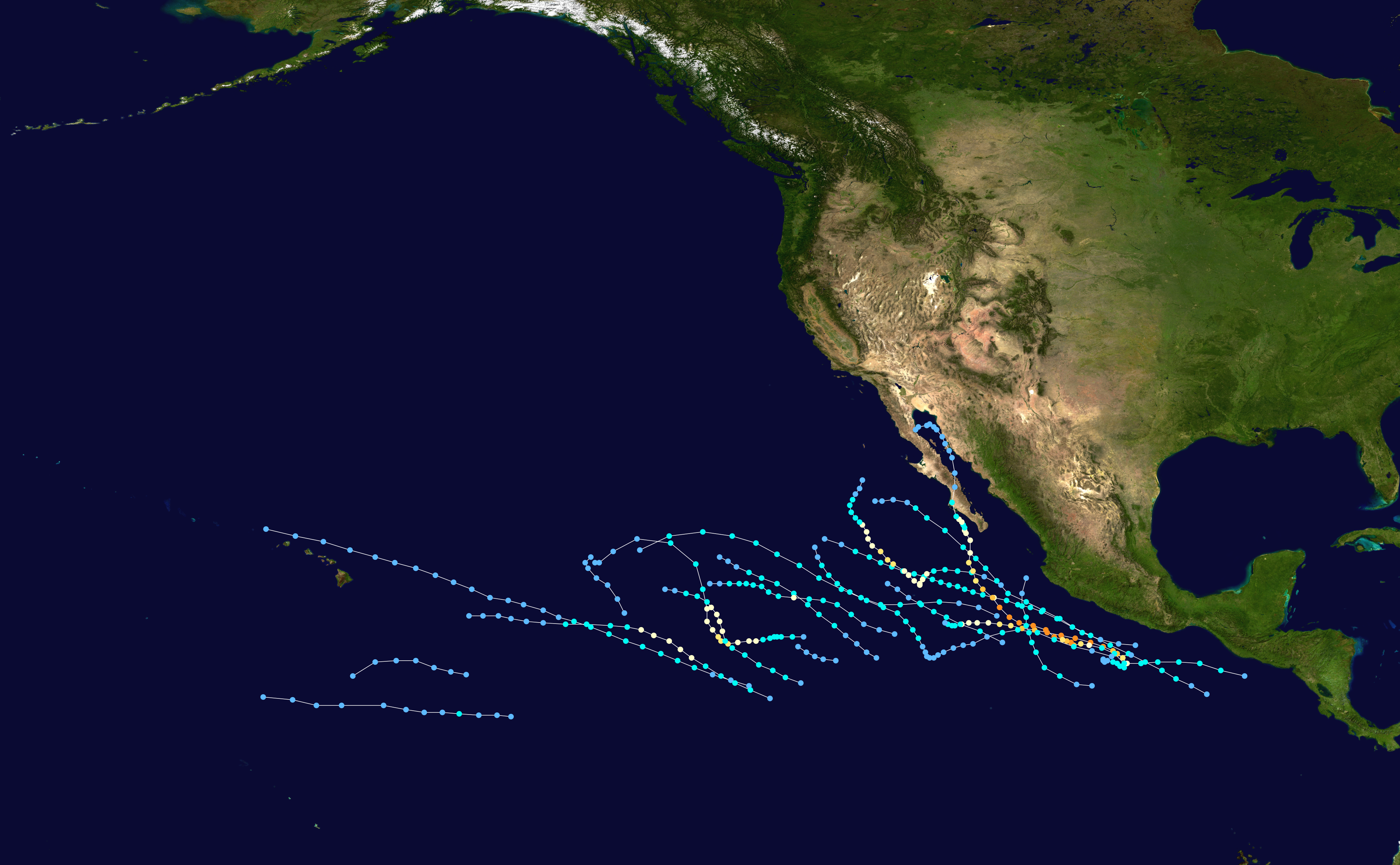
- Season summary map

Seasonal boundaries
- First system formed: May 25, 2001
- Last system dissipated: November 3, 2001

Strongest storm
- Name: Juliette
  - Maximum winds: 145 mph (230 km/h) (1-minute sustained)
  - Lowest pressure: 923 mbar (hPa; 27.26 inHg)

Seasonal statistics
- Total depressions: 19
- Total storms: 15
- Hurricanes: 8
- Major hurricanes (Cat. 3+): 2
- Total fatalities: 17 total
- Total damage: $401 million (2001 USD)

Related articles
- Timeline of the 2001 Pacific hurricane season; 2001 Atlantic hurricane season; 2001 Pacific typhoon season; 2001 North Indian Ocean cyclone season

The 2001 Pacific hurricane season featured tropical cyclone activity in every month from May to November across the Pacific Ocean, north of the equator and east of the International Date Line. It was a near-average Pacific hurricane season, featuring 15 named storms across the Pacific basin, one fewer than the seasonal average at the time. Eight of the storms attained hurricane status, including two major hurricanes. (Note: A major hurricane is a storm that ranks as Category 3 or higher on the Saffir–Simpson hurricane scale.) There were also four tropical depressions that did not intensify into a named storm. The season officially began on May 15 in the Pacific Ocean east of 140°W, and on June 1 in the Central Pacific. The season ended on November 30.

The first storm of the season, Adolph, formed on May 25 offshore southwest Mexico. It became the strongest hurricane in the month of May at the time, attaining maximum sustained winds of 145 mph (230 km/h) on May 29, making it a Category 4 hurricane on the Saffir-Simpson scale. In June, Tropical Storm Barbara passed just north of Hawaii, bringing minimal impact. There were three storms in July, including Hurricane Dalila, which killed two people from lightning strikes. There was only one named storm in August, Hurricane Flossie. It was the first of five storms to originate from a tropical wave that earlier produced a tropical cyclone in the Atlantic. The remnants of Flossie produced thunderstorms in California that killed two people from lightning strikes.

September was much more active with six systems developing, of which three became hurricanes. Hurricane Gil and Tropical Storm Henriette interacted with each other until the latter was absorbed by the former. The most notable storm of the season, Hurricane Juliette, formed during the month; it killed 13 people and left $400 million in damage in Mexico. (Note: Damage totals are listed in United States dollars unless otherwise stated and are unadjusted for inflation.) Juliette made the only landfall during the season, when it moved ashore Baja California Sur as a tropical storm. There were four named storms in October, including two hurricanes. The final storm of the season, Hurricane Octave, dissipated on November 3, 27 days before the official end of the season.

== Seasonal summary ==
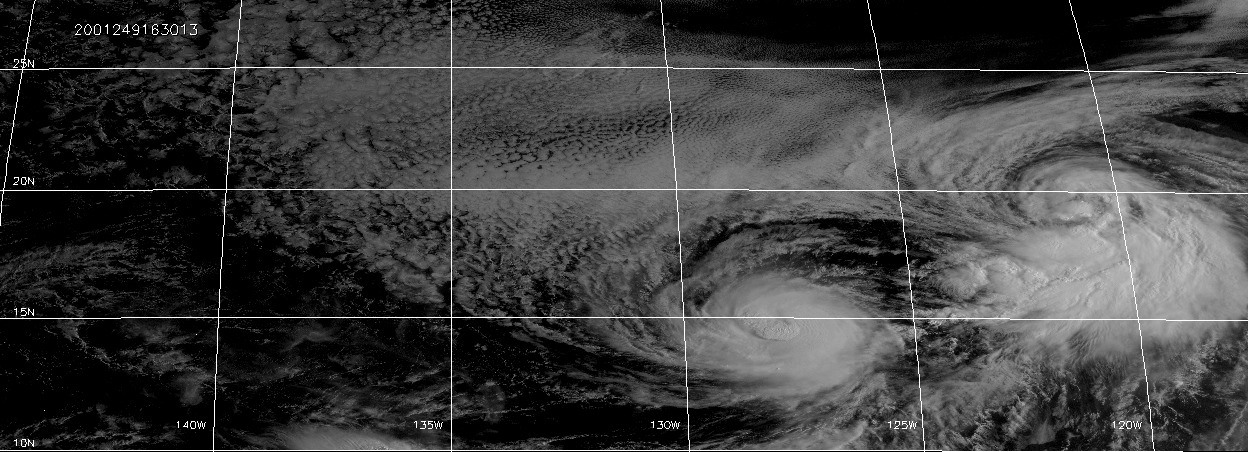
Hurricane Gil (left) and Tropical Storm Henriette (right) on September 7

The basin experienced La Niña to neutral atmospheric conditions, which began in 1998 and continued through the year. The season officially began on May 15 in Eastern Pacific and on June 1 in Central Pacific; both ended on November 30. There were 15 tropical storms in the eastern Pacific basin during the 2001 season, one below-average. Seven of those became hurricanes, which have maximum sustained winds of at least 75 mph (120 km/h). This was two below-normal. Two hurricanes became major hurricanes, which reach Category 3 intensity or higher on the Saffir–Simpson hurricane scale (SSHS). This was below the normal of four major hurricanes. Four tropical depressions also formed and dissipated before reaching the intensity of a named storm. The four tropical cyclones in the Central Pacific was near the long-term average, although all were weak.

Hurricane Adolph, the first storm of the season, formed in late May, and became the strongest May hurricane on record at the time. It was later surpassed by Hurricane Amanda in 2014. This season featured one named storm in June, followed by three in July. There was only one named storm in August – Flossie; well below the average of four. Activity picked up in September, when five named storms were observed. These included Hurricane Gil and Tropical Storm Henriette, which interacted with each other, and Juliette, which had the season's only landfall in Mexico. There were three named storms in October. In addition to Juliette, several storms came close enough to land to require tropical cyclone warnings and watches, including Adolph, Dalila, Ivo, and Lorena.

== Systems ==
=== Hurricane Adolph ===
- Category 4 hurricane (SSHWS)
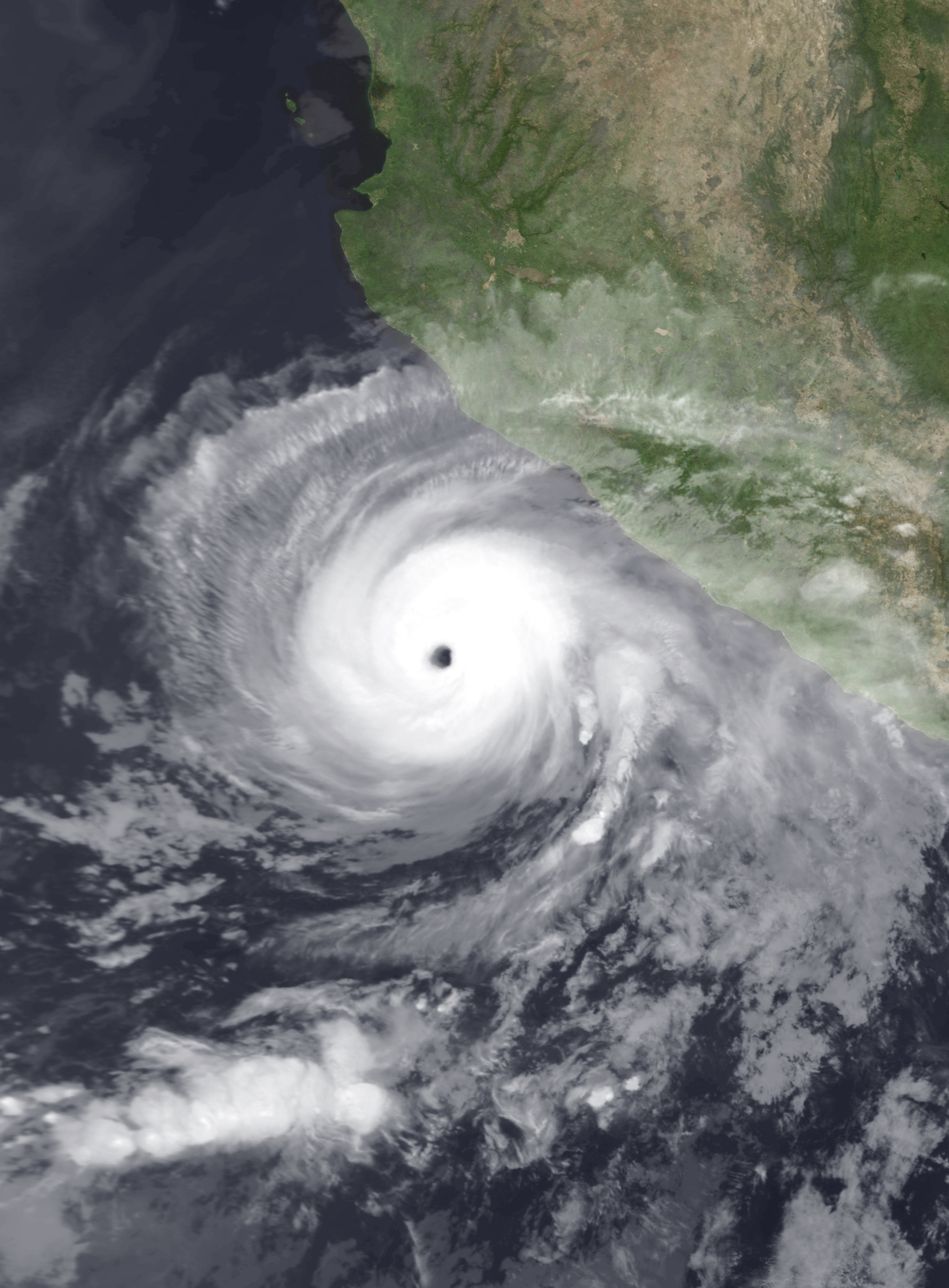
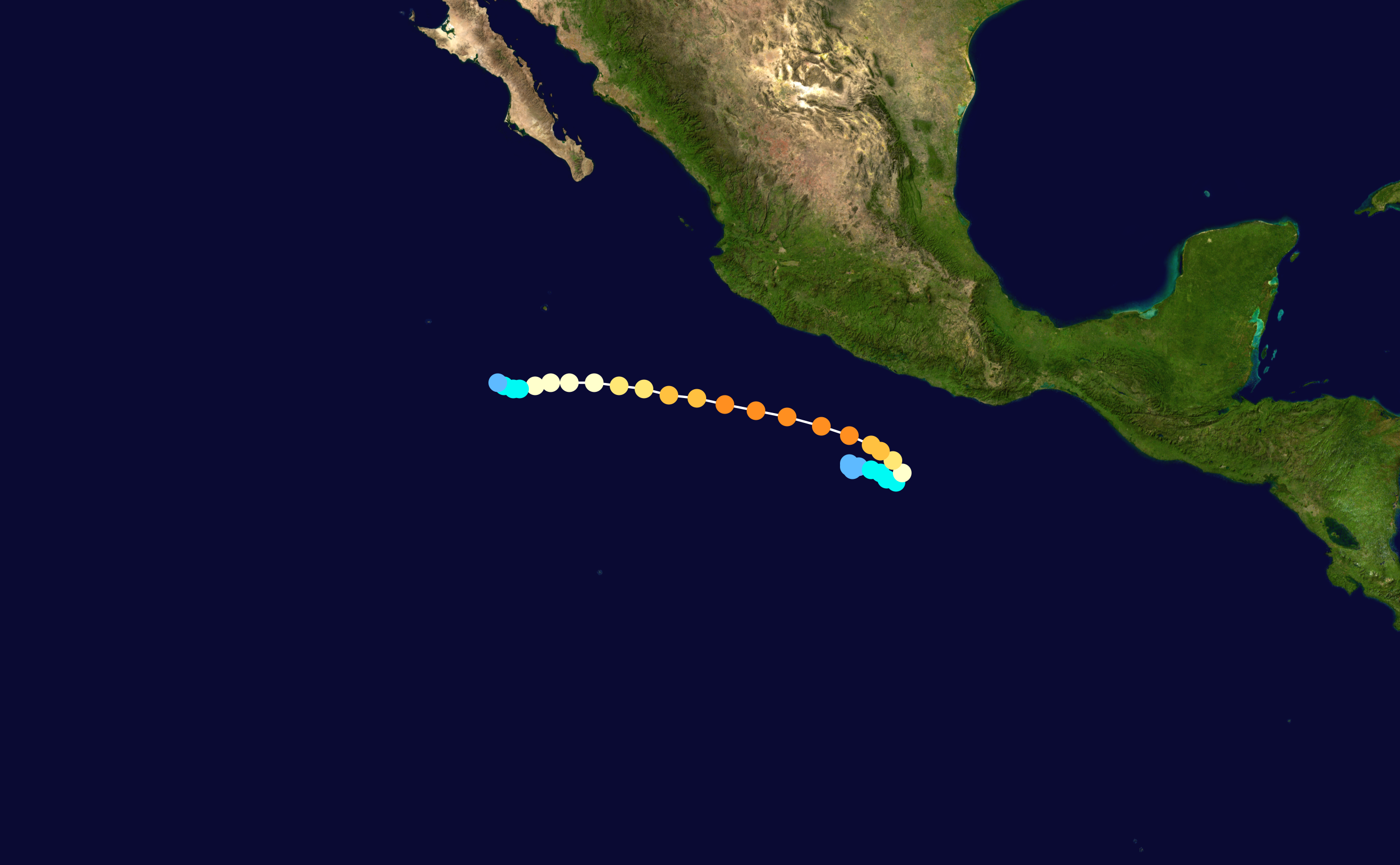
- Duration: May 25 – June 1
- Peak intensity: 145 mph (230 km/h) (1-min); 940 mbar (hPa)

On May 7, a tropical wave exited the west coast of Africa and moved across the Atlantic. A weak low pressure area began forming along the wave axis on May 18. The system crossed into the eastern Pacific on May 22. At first the system was disorganized, until convection, or thunderstorms, became more organized on May 24. On the next day, it developed into Tropical Depression One-E about 250 miles (400 km) south-southwest of Acapulco, Mexico. The nascent depression moved slowly eastward, steered by a ridge to the north. With low wind shear and warm water temperatures, the depression strengthened into Tropical Storm Adolph on May 26. A day later, the storm had developed an eye, as the storm turned northwestward. Late on May 27, Adolph attained hurricane status, and the next day it passed about 165 mi (265 km) southwest of Acapulco. Continuing to strengthen, Adolph reached peak winds of 145 mph (230 km/h) on May 29, making it a Category 4 hurricane. While it was rapidly intensifying, Adolph's pressure dropped 1.46 mbars per hour, falling to a minimum of 940 mbar (28 inHg). The hurricane underwent an eyewall replacement cycle and it subsequently weakened. Water and air temperatures cooled, and Adolph fell to tropical storm status on June 1 as the convection rapidly diminished. It quickly weakened into a tropical depression, and was no longer a tropical cyclone by June 2. The remaining clouds persisted for a few more days to the southwest of the Baja California peninsula.

Due to Adolph's threat, the government of Mexico issued a tropical storm warning and a hurricane watch from Acapulco to Lázaro Cárdenas. Ports in Acapulco were closed to small vessels. Adolph ultimately produced rainfall and heavy surf to the southwest Mexican coastline.

=== Tropical Storm Barbara ===
- Tropical storm (SSHWS)
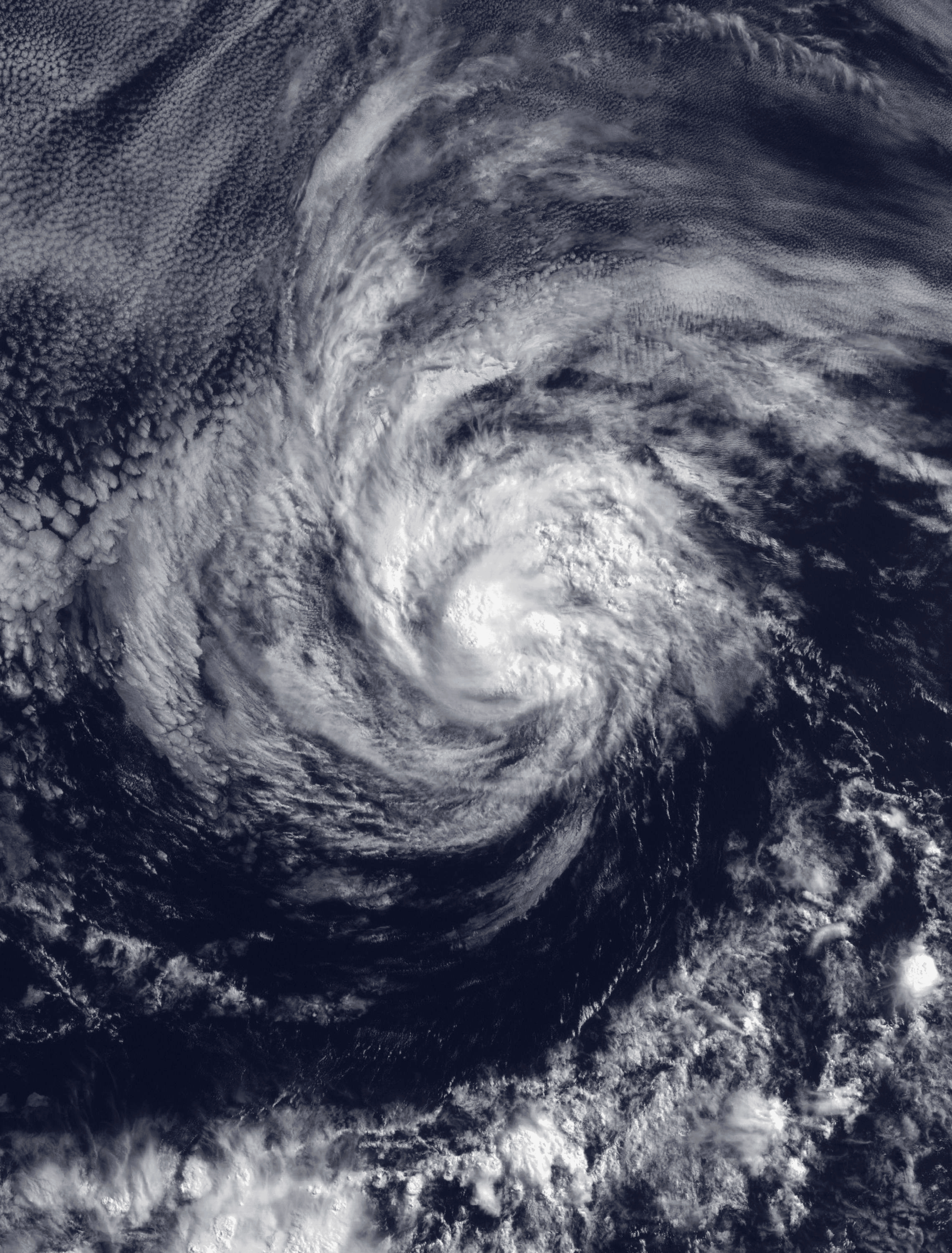
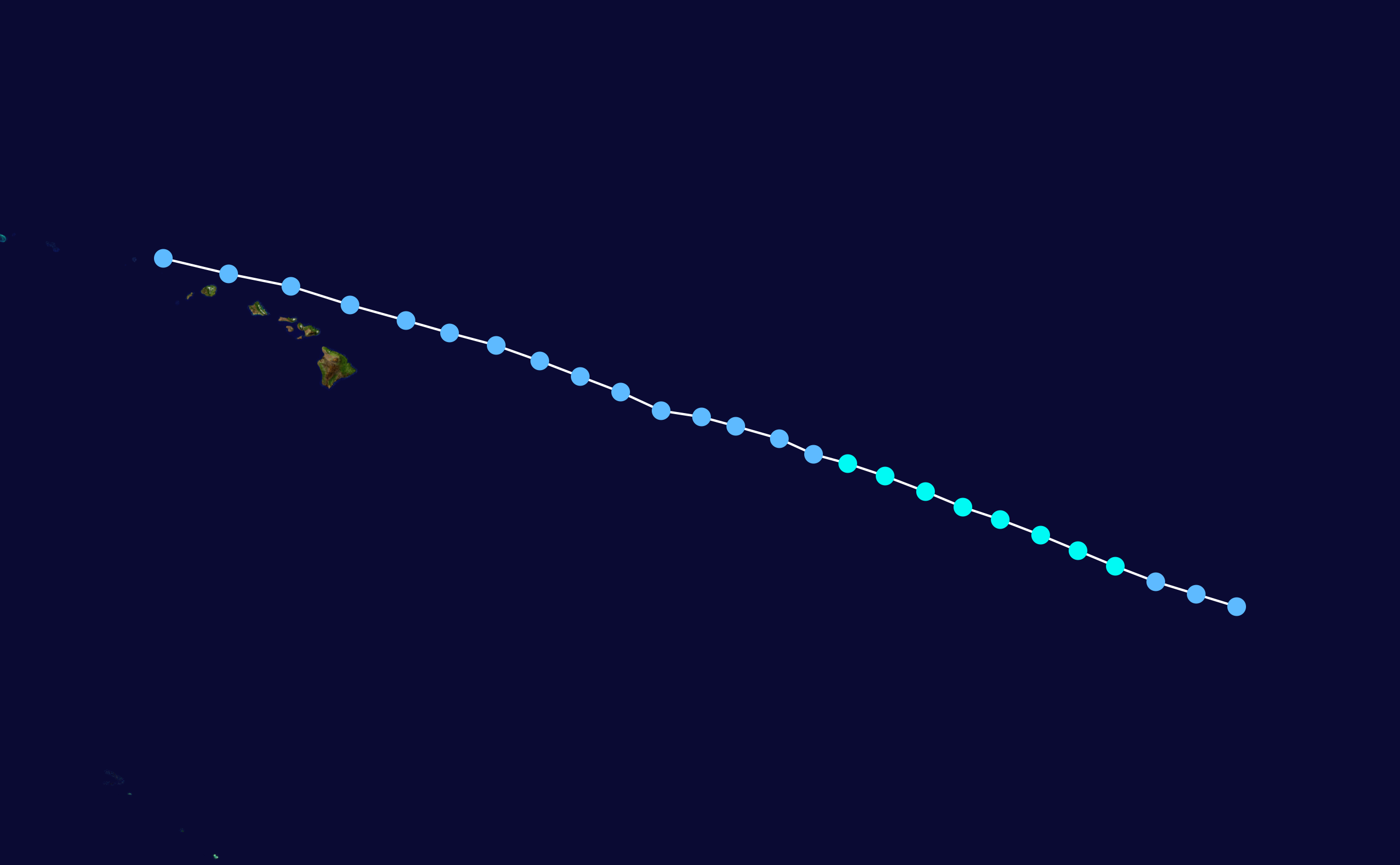
- Duration: June 20 – June 26
- Peak intensity: 60 mph (95 km/h) (1-min); 997 mbar (hPa)

A tropical wave moved off the coast of Africa on June 1, which entered the eastern Pacific ten days later. Continuing to the west, the wave eventually developed a broad circulation on June 18. After further organization, the system developed into Tropical Depression Two-E on June 20, located about 1,325 mi (2,130 km) southwest of Cabo San Lucas, Mexico. Within 18 hours of forming, the depression strengthened into Tropical Storm Barbara. On June 21, Barbara attained peak winds of 60 mph (95 km/h). Around that time, the convection had become more organized, with banding features. Shortly thereafter, the storm encountered stronger wind shear and cooler water temperatures. On June 22, Barbara weakened into a tropical depression as it crossed into the central Pacific. It was the recorded first June tropical cyclone in the central Pacific. On June 23, the CPHC issued its final advisory on Barbara. The circulation continued to the west-northwest, passing north of the Hawaiian Islands on June 25. Across the state, the storm brought 5 to 8 ft (1.5 to 2.4 m) waves, along with unsettled weather. The circulation dissipated northwest of Kauai on June 26, and the remnants were absorbed by a frontal zone near Midway Island.

=== Tropical Storm Cosme ===
- Tropical storm (SSHWS)
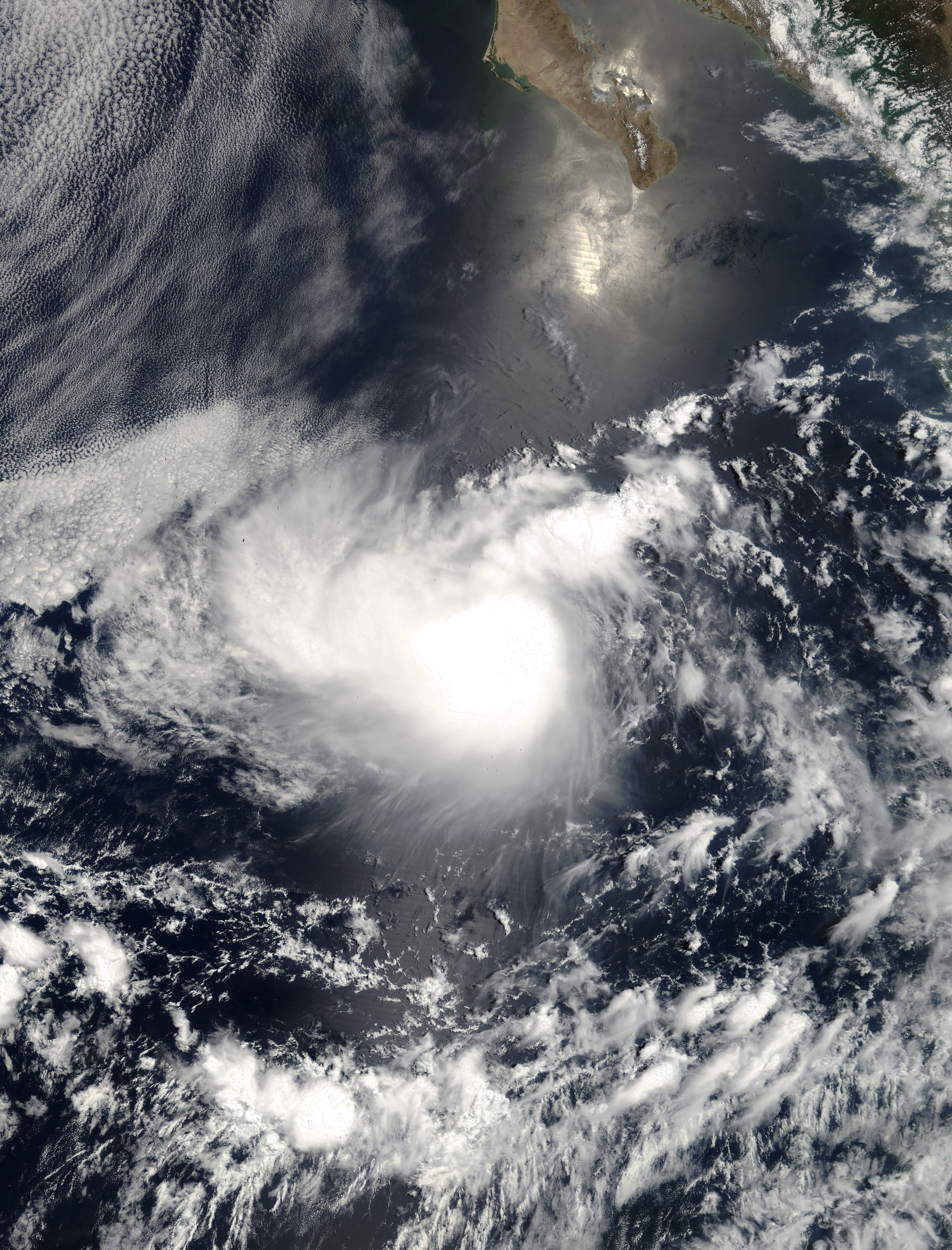
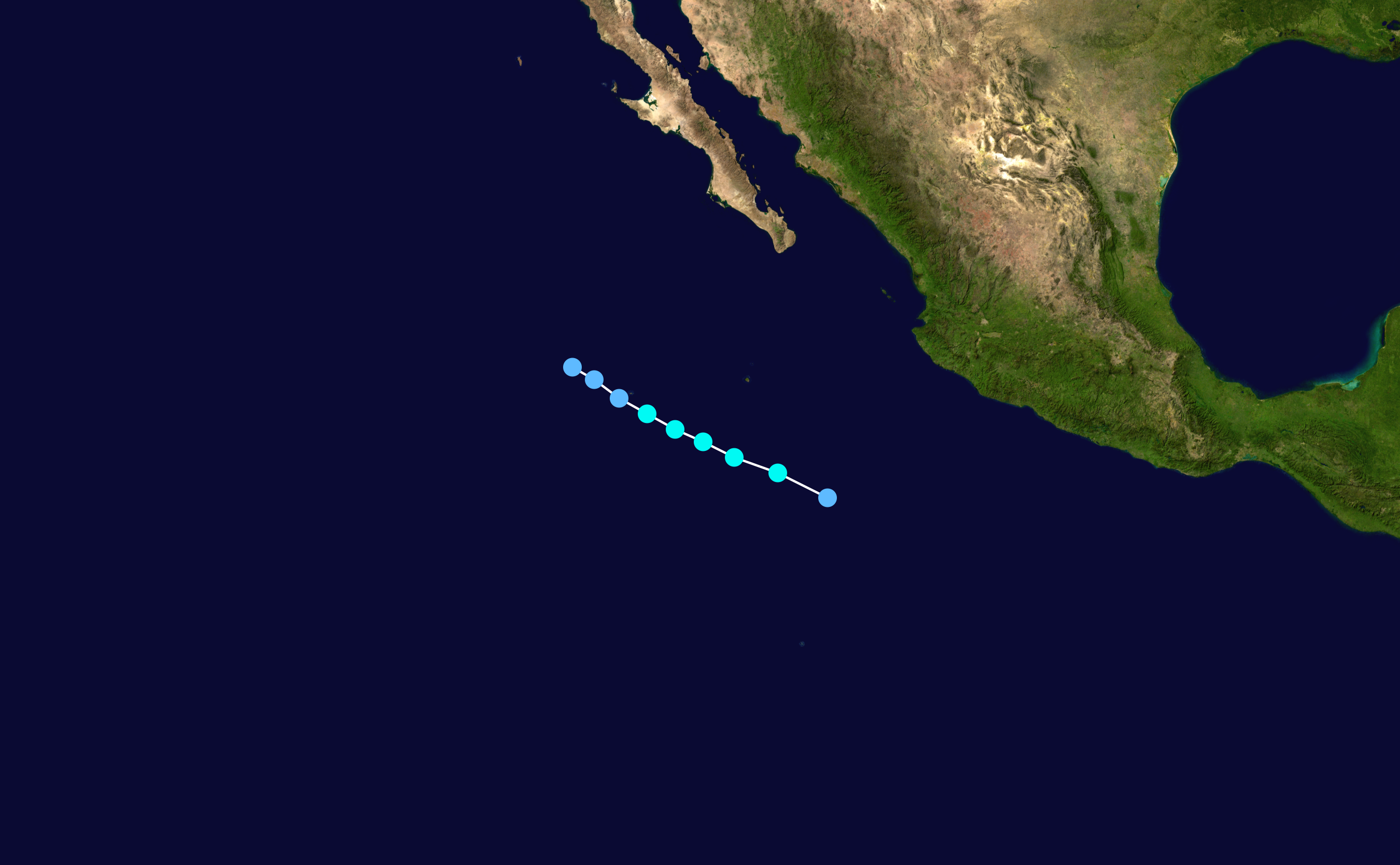
- Duration: July 13 – July 15
- Peak intensity: 45 mph (75 km/h) (1-min); 1000 mbar (hPa)

A tropical wave entered the eastern Pacific basin on July 6, and proceeded westward. A low pressure area formed on July 10, but it was halted by wind shear from an upper-level trough. The system gradually organized, developing into Tropical Depression Three-E on July 13, located about 330 mi (530 km) southwest of Manzanillo, Mexico. It quickly strengthened into Tropical Storm Cosme, and within 12 hours of forming, it attained peak winds of 45 mph (75 km/h). On July 14, the wind shear stripped the thunderstorms from the center, causing Cosme to weaken back into a tropical depression. Moving over cooler waters, Cosme degenerated into a remnant low on July 15, although the circulation lasted another three days before dissipating.

=== Tropical Storm Erick ===
- Tropical storm (SSHWS)
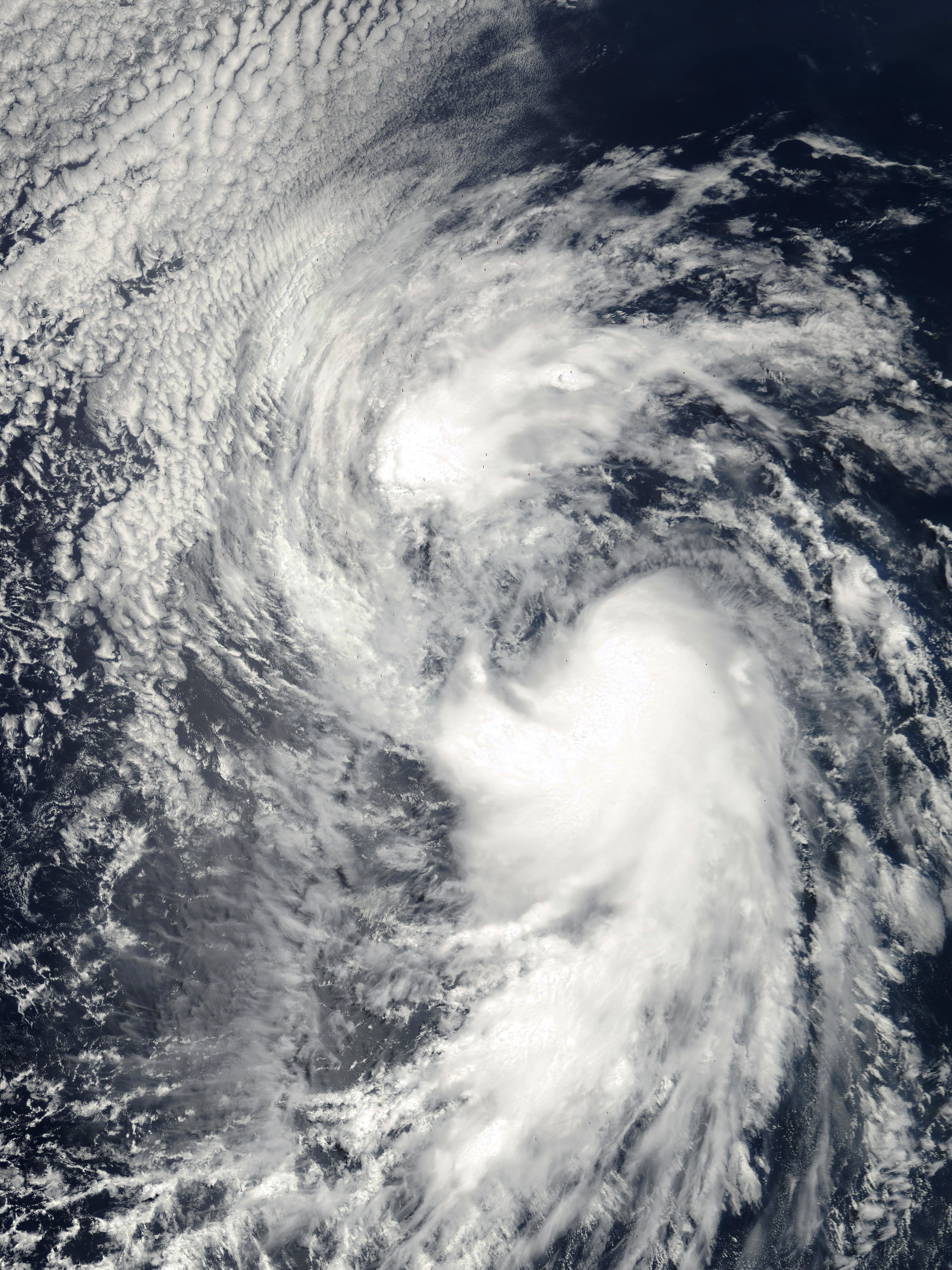
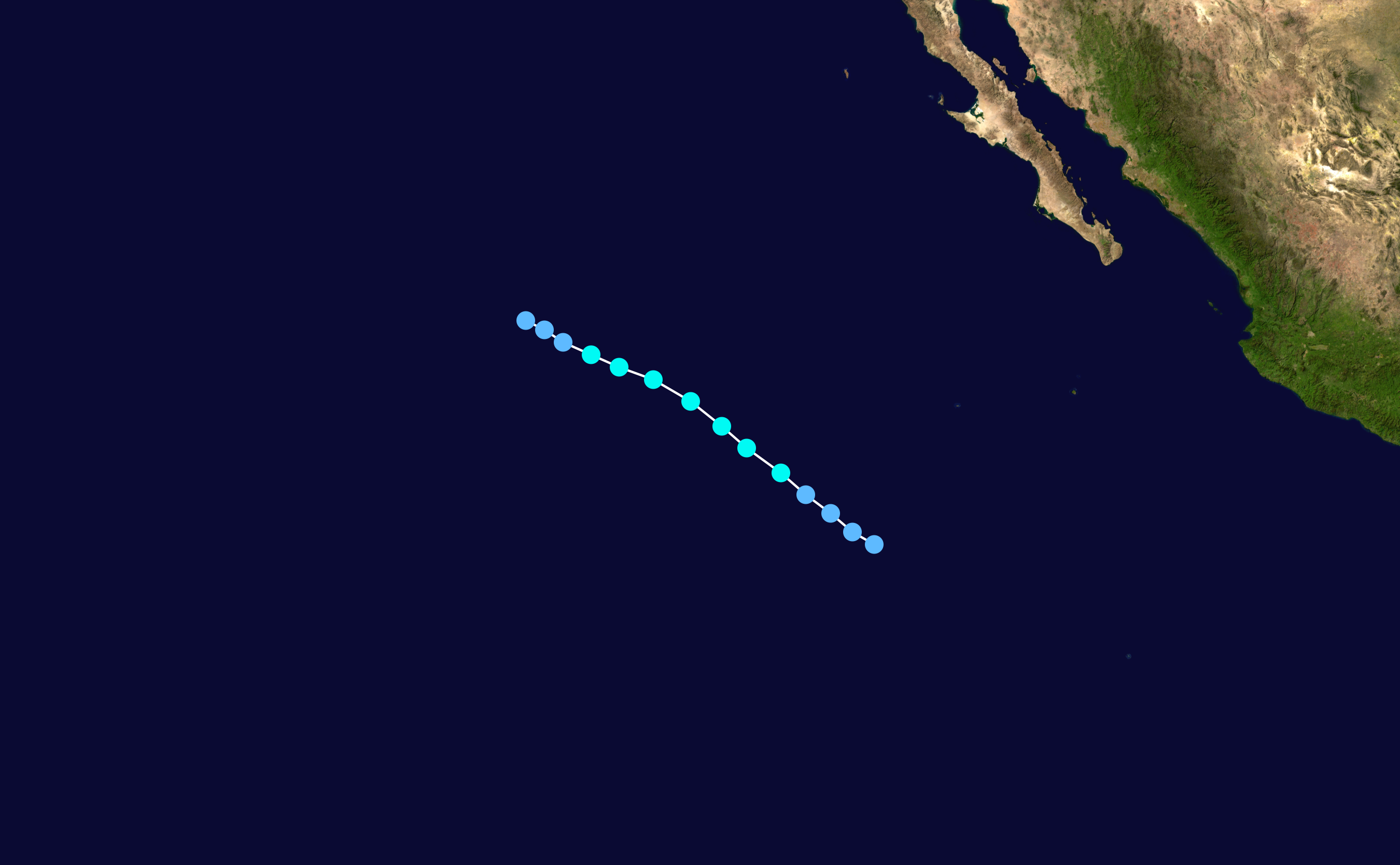
- Duration: July 20 – July 24
- Peak intensity: 40 mph (65 km/h) (1-min); 1001 mbar (hPa)

A tropical wave reached the eastern Pacific on July 16. Continuing westward, it developed an area of thunderstorms on July 18 while the system was south of the Baja California peninsula. Following gradual organization, Tropical Depression Four-E developed late on July 20, located about 790 mi (1,275 km) southwest of the southern tip of the Baja California peninsula. The depression moved to the west-northwest, although it was large and disorganized, impacted by wind shear. Late on July 21, the depression intensified into Tropical Storm Erick, reaching peak winds of 40 mph (65 km/h) and a minimum pressure of 1,001 mbar (29.6 inHg). Erick soon encountered cooler waters, which prevented further strengthening. The storm fell to tropical depression status on July 23, and degenerated into a remnant low the next day, which produced intermittent thunderstorms before dissipating.

=== Hurricane Dalila ===
- Category 1 hurricane (SSHWS)
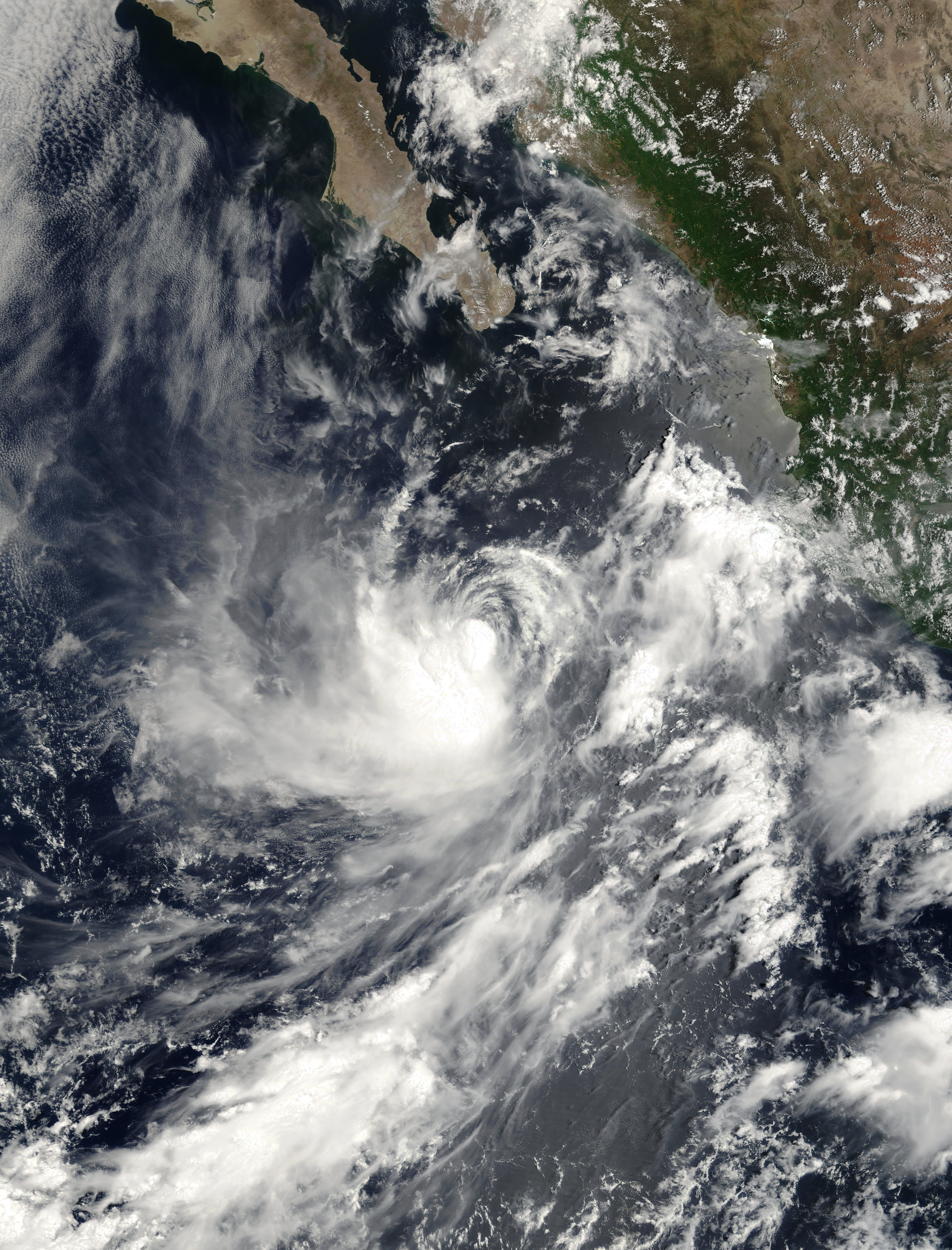
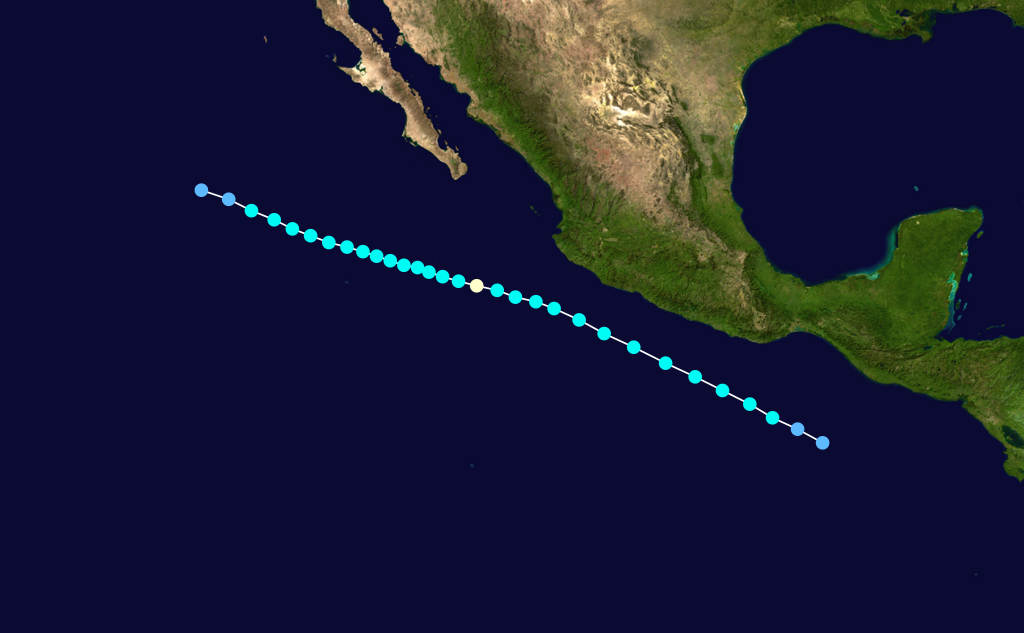
- Duration: July 21 – July 28
- Peak intensity: 75 mph (120 km/h) (1-min); 987 mbar (hPa)

A tropical wave entered the eastern Pacific on July 18. Continuing westward, the system gradually organized. Early on July 21, it developed into Tropical Depression Five-E, located about 250 mi (400 km) south of the Gulf of Tehuantepec. A subtropical ridge the north steered the system to the west-northwest, parallel to the southern Mexican coastline. Within 12 hours of forming, the depression strengthened into Tropical Storm Dalila, aided by warm water temperatures and low wind shear. On July 22, the storm approached within 115 mi (185 km) of the southwest Mexican coast, between Acapulco and Manzanillo. Moving farther offshore, Dalila briefly reached hurricane status on July 24, with peak winds of 75 mph (120 km/h) and a minimum pressure of 987 mbar (987 hPa). The NHC assessed the estimated peak intensity based on the circulation embedded within the central dense overcast, and a warm spot in the center. Soon after peaking, Dalila began weakening due to increased wind shear. It passed directly over Socorro Island on July 25 as a tropical storm. Although the wind shear dropped, the water temperatures cooled, causing the thunderstorms to diminish. On July 28, Dalila fell to tropical depression status, and it dissipated soon after off the southwest coast of the Baja California peninsula.

The threat of the Dalila led to tropical storm warnings in southwestern Mexico from Punta Maldonado, Guerrero to Lázaro Cárdenas, Michoacán. This included a hurricane watch from Lázaro Cárdenas to Manzanillo. The storm produced heavy rainfall in southwest Mexico that led to flash flooding. In Chiapas, lightning strikes killed two people and injured eight others. Dozens of homes were damaged by the floods in the state, affecting about 1,000 people. In Guererro, rainfall reached 6.3 in (161 mm). In Acapulco, the floods damaged about 20 homes.

=== Hurricane Flossie ===
- Category 2 hurricane (SSHWS)
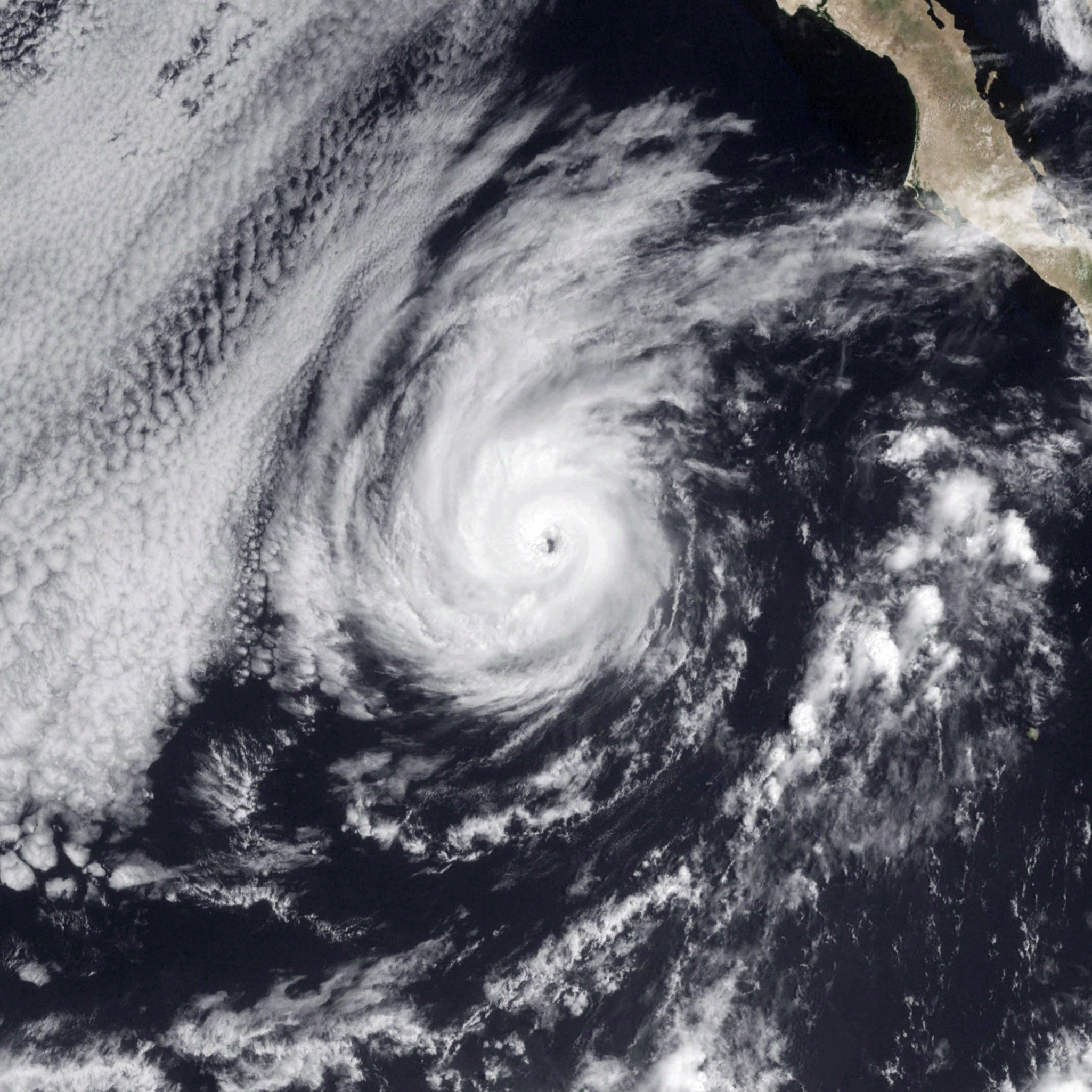
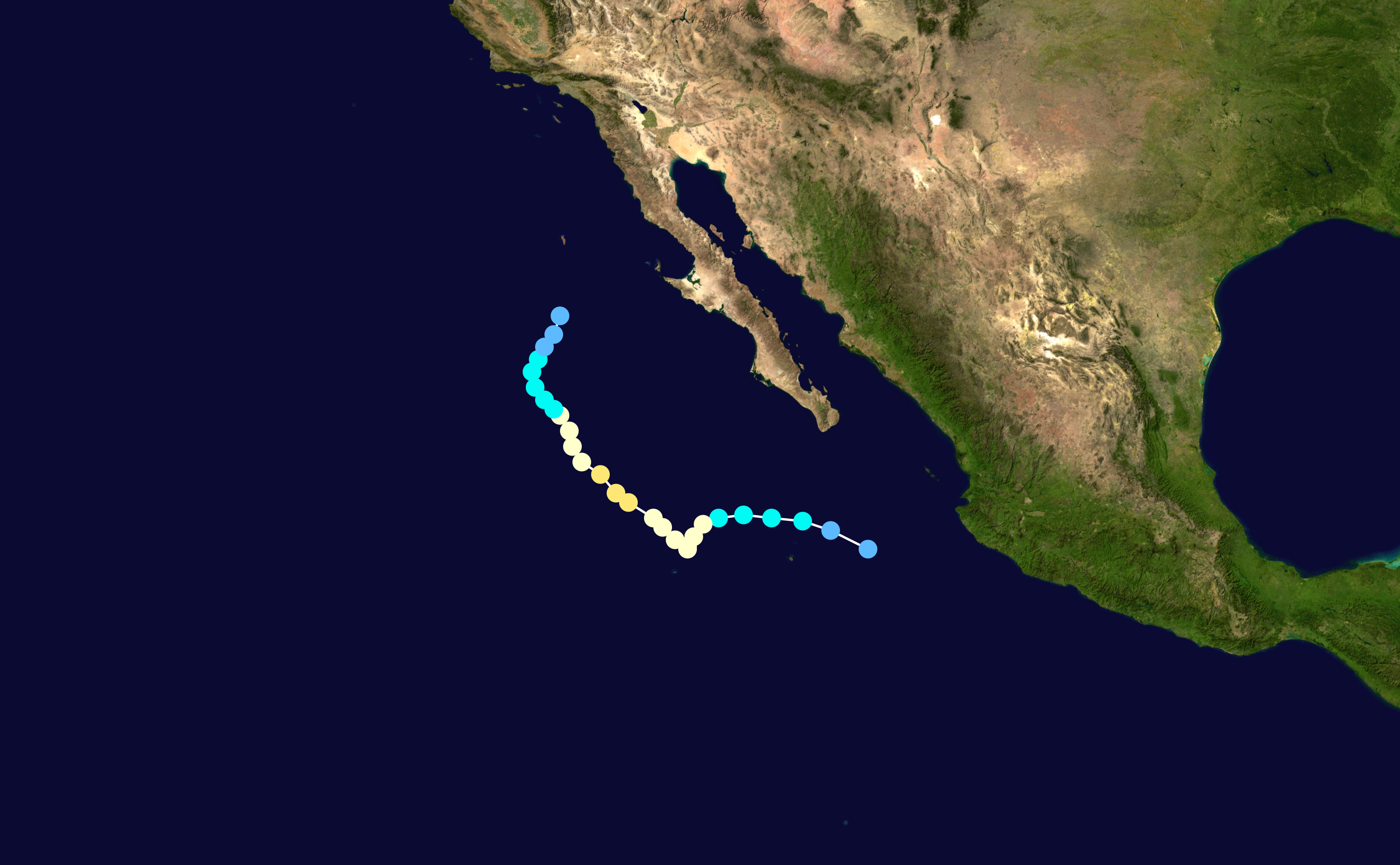
- Duration: August 26 – September 2
- Peak intensity: 105 mph (165 km/h) (1-min); 972 mbar (hPa)

The origins of Flossie were from the same tropical wave that spawned Tropical Storm Chantal in the Atlantic. The southern portion of the wave crossed into the eastern Pacific on August 21, and continued westward without much organization at first. On August 25, the system passed near Manzanillo, producing wind gusts of 46 mph (74 km/h) there. The circulation was too broad for the system to be classifiable as a tropical cyclone at the time. As it moved away from the Mexican coast, the circulation became better defined. On August 26, the system developed into Tropical Depression Seven-E while located about 270 mi (435 km) southeast of the southern tip of the Baja California peninsula. It quickly strengthened into Tropical Storm Flossie. Steered by a ridge to its north, Flossie moved to the west-northwest, passing just north of Socorro Island. Late on August 27, Flossie attained hurricane status, despite wind shear from a nearby upper-level low. The two systems interacted, causing Flossie to slow, turn to the southwest, and execute a small loop. After the upper-level low moved northeastward away from the hurricane, Flossie strengthened further, as the eye became better defined. On August 29, the hurricane reached peak winds of 105 mph (165 km/h), and a minimum pressure of 972 mbar (28.7 inHg). Soon after, Flossie weakened due to wind shear from an approaching mid-level trough. It fell to tropical storm status on August 31 as water temperatures decreased. Flossie weakened further into a tropical depression on September 1 while curving to the northeast. It dissipated on September 2, although the circulation persisted for a few more days.

While Flossie was dissipating, its middle and upper-level circulation moved across Baja California and into the southwestern United States. The remnants of the storm generated thunderstorms across southern California, killing two people due to lightning strikes. The lightning injured two other people and also led to several small fires. The thunderstorms also produced flash flooding in San Diego and Riverside counties in California after dropping more than 2 in (51 mm) of rain in one hour. The floods caused mudslides that affected several roads. A strong downdraft knocked a tree onto a house. Damage in California reached $35,000.

=== Hurricane Gil ===
- Category 2 hurricane (SSHWS)
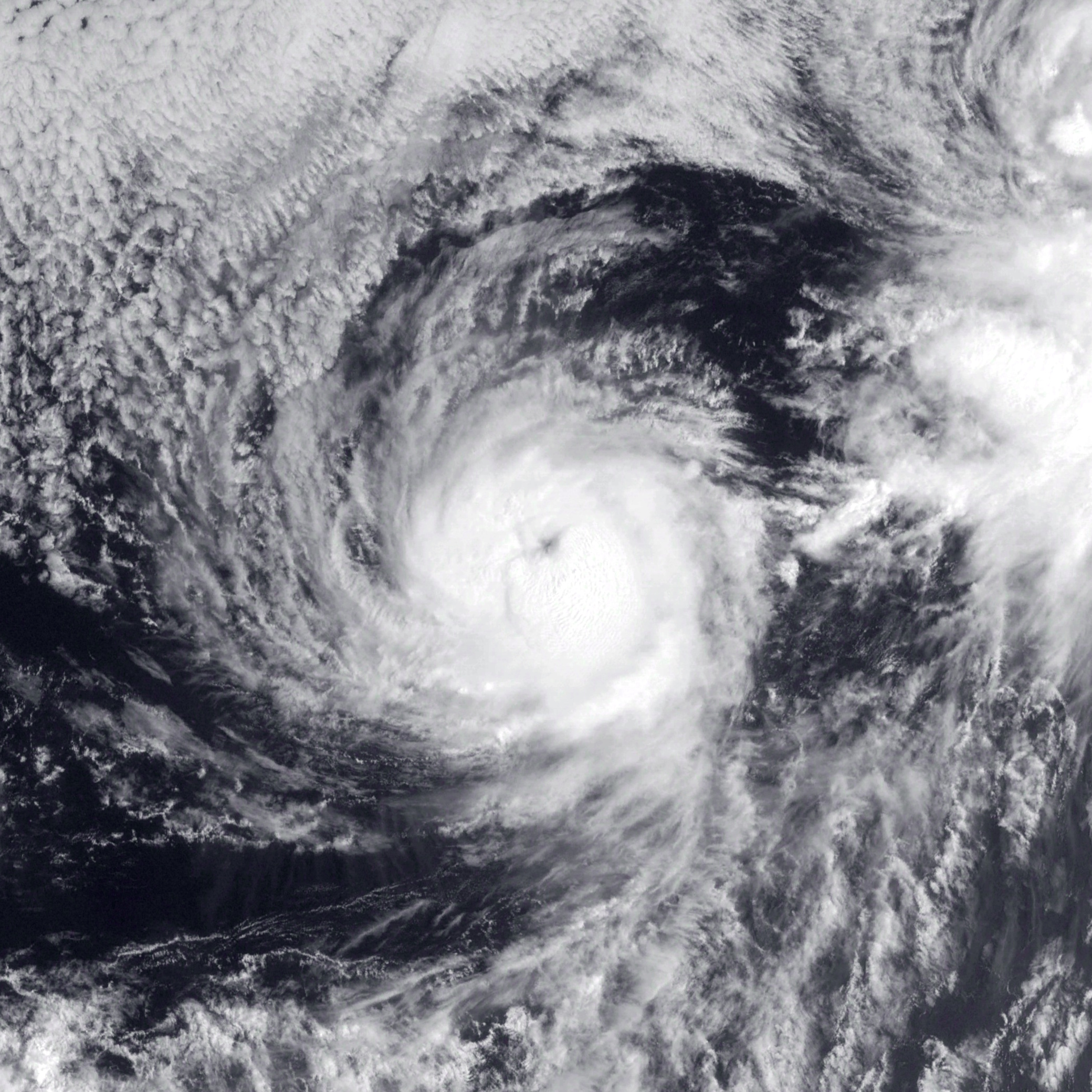
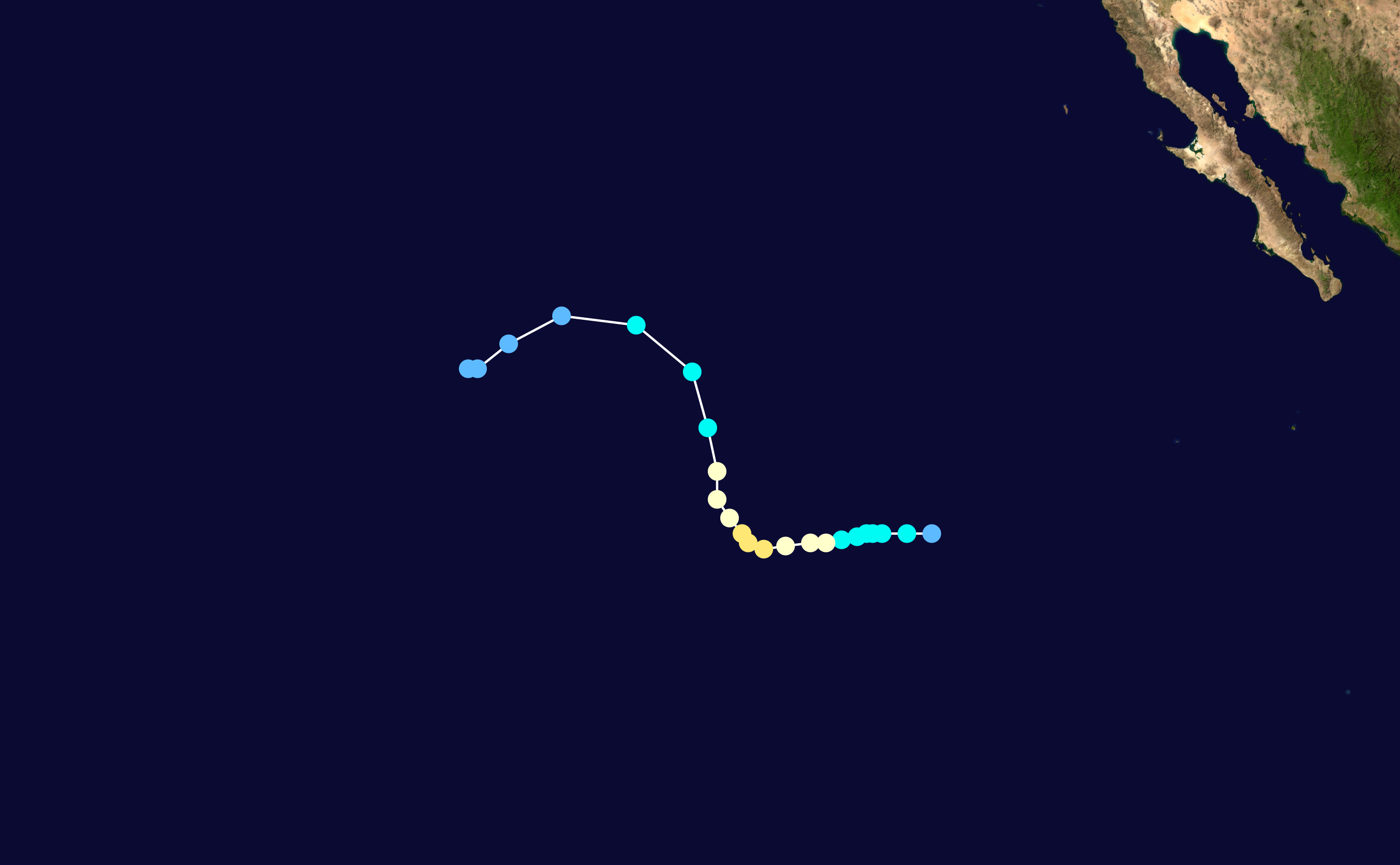
- Duration: September 4 – September 9
- Peak intensity: 100 mph (155 km/h) (1-min); 975 mbar (hPa)

The same tropical wave that spawned Atlantic Tropical Storm Dean also entered the eastern Pacific on August 24. Continuing westward into a monsoon-like environment, the system slowly organized, developing into a tropical depression on September 4. At the time, it was located about 850 mi (1,370 km) southwest of the southern tip of the Baja California peninsula. The depression quickly intensified into Tropical Storm Gil. Developing a ragged eye, Gil attained hurricane status on September 6, and later that day reached peak winds of 100 mph (155 km/h), with a minimum pressure of 975 mbar (28.8 inHg). Around the time of Gil reaching peak intensity, it interacted with nearby Tropical Storm Henriette, and the two storms orbited around each other. Outflow from Henriette caused Gil to weaken as the hurricane accelerated northward, and Gil weakened to tropical storm status on September 8. On the next day, the track shifted to the southwest as Gil absorbed the remnants of Henriette and it fell to tropical depression status. Gil was no longer a tropical cyclone by September 10, although the circulation continued to the northwest over the next few days. On September 19, a cold front north of Hawaii absorbed the remnants of Gil.

=== Tropical Storm Henriette ===
- Tropical storm (SSHWS)
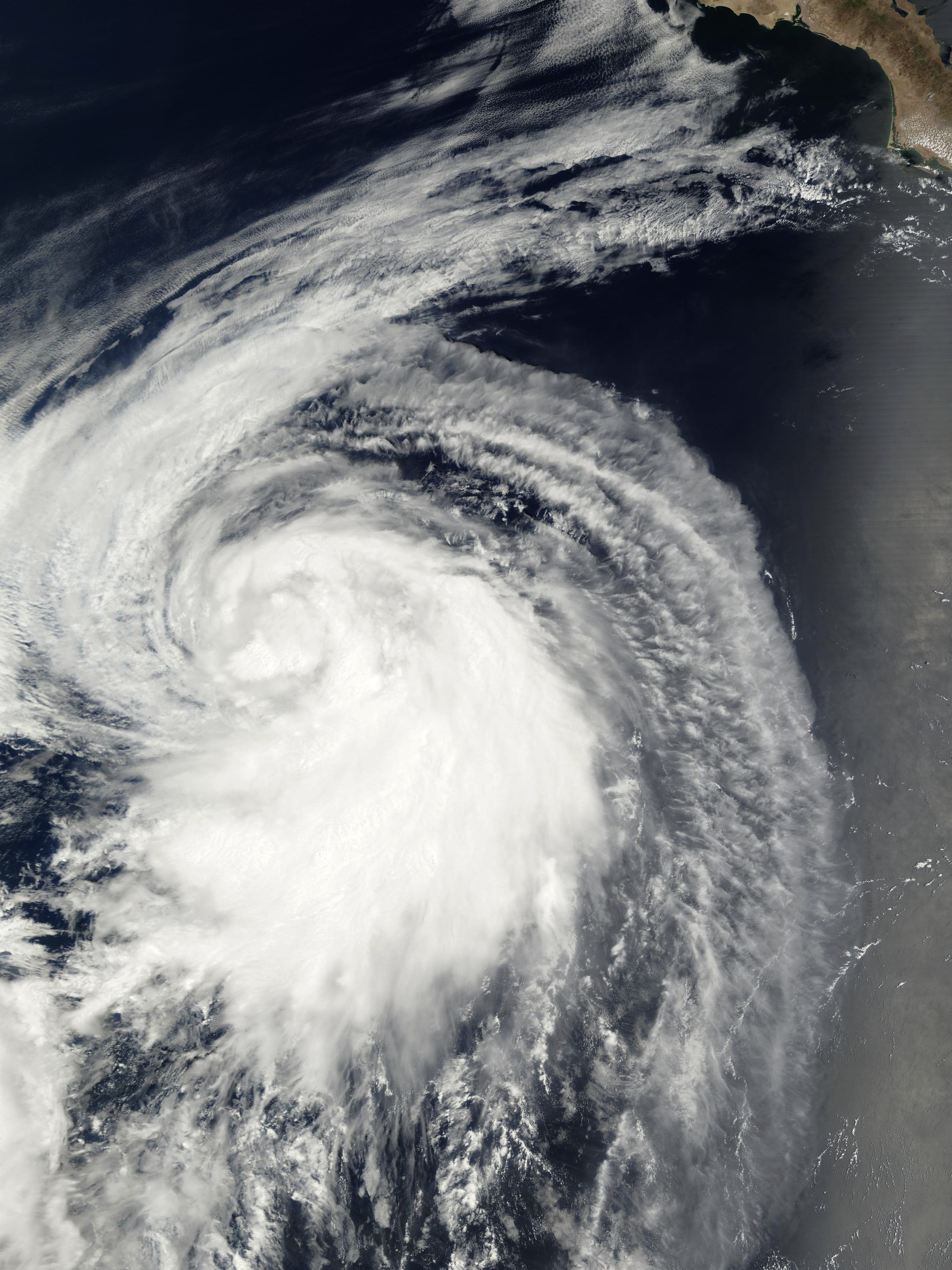
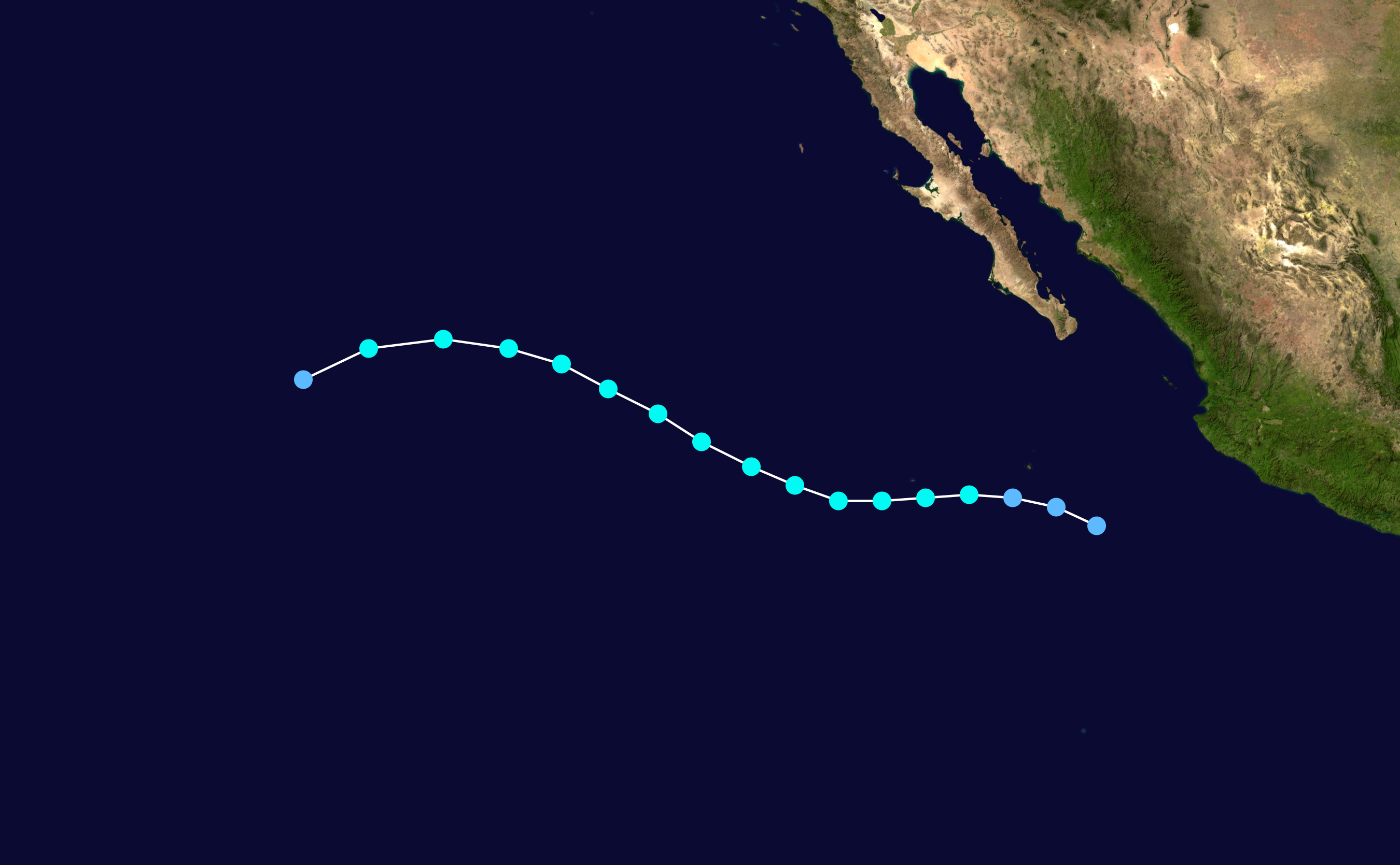
- Duration: September 4 – September 8
- Peak intensity: 65 mph (100 km/h) (1-min); 994 mbar (hPa)

A tropical wave crossed Central America into the eastern Pacific by August 29. Moving westward to the south of Mexico, the system's thunderstorms gradually organized. On September 4, Tropical Depression Nine-E developed about 345 mi (555 km) west-southwest of Manzanillo. At the time of its formation, the depression was located about 880 mi (1,415 km) east of Tropical Storm Gil. On September 5, the depression intensified into Tropical Storm Henriette, which continued to organize, developing outflow and rainbands. On September 7, Henriette reached peak winds of 65 mph (100 km/h), with a minimum pressure of 994 mbar (29.4 inHg). Afterward, the storm moved over cooler waters, while also revolving around the northern periphery of Gil. Losing thunderstorms, Henriette weakened to a tropical depression on September 8, and soon after was no longer classifiable as a tropical cyclone. The dissipating circulation was absorbed by Gil on September 9.

=== Tropical Storm Ivo ===
- Tropical storm (SSHWS)
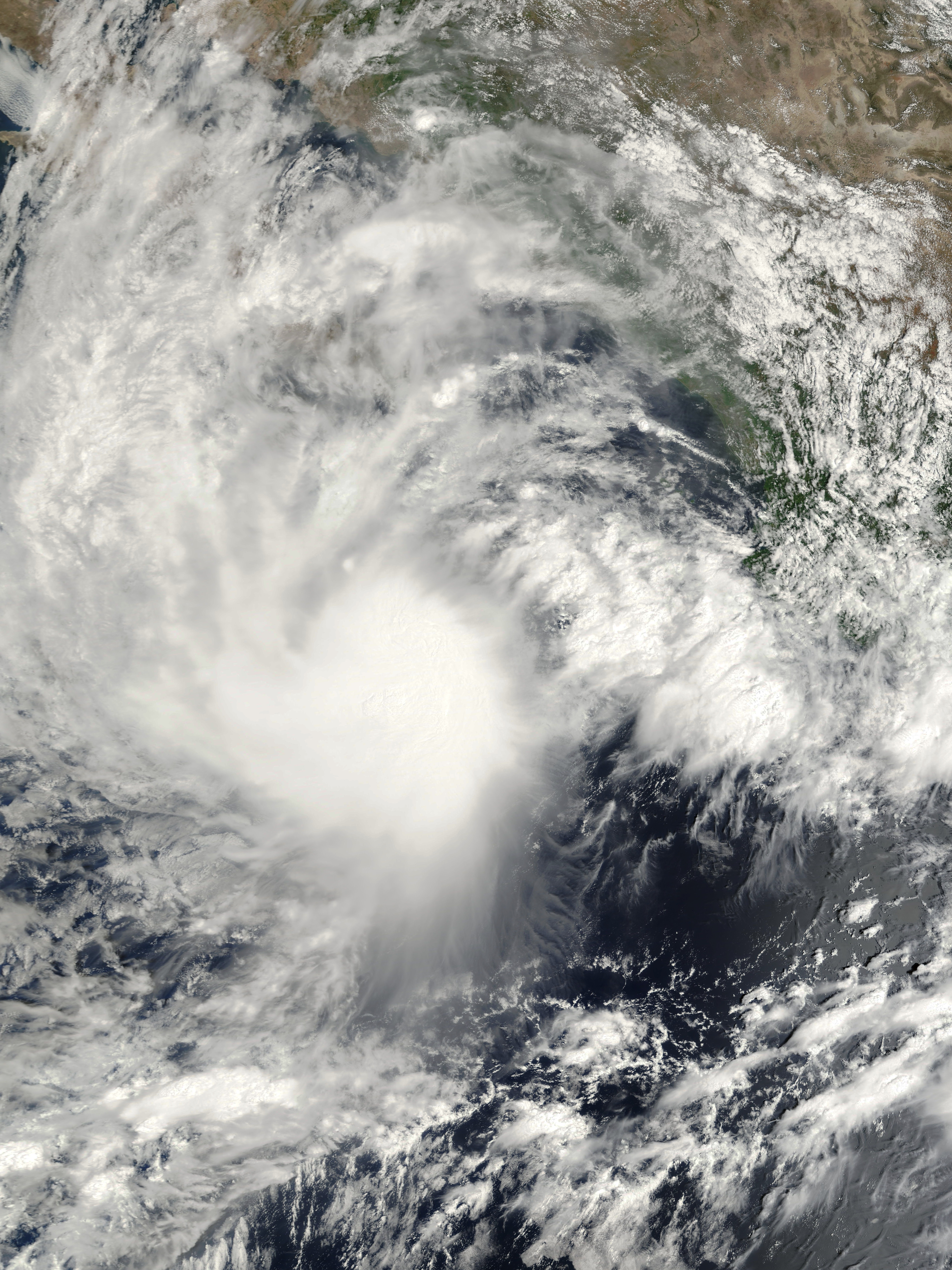
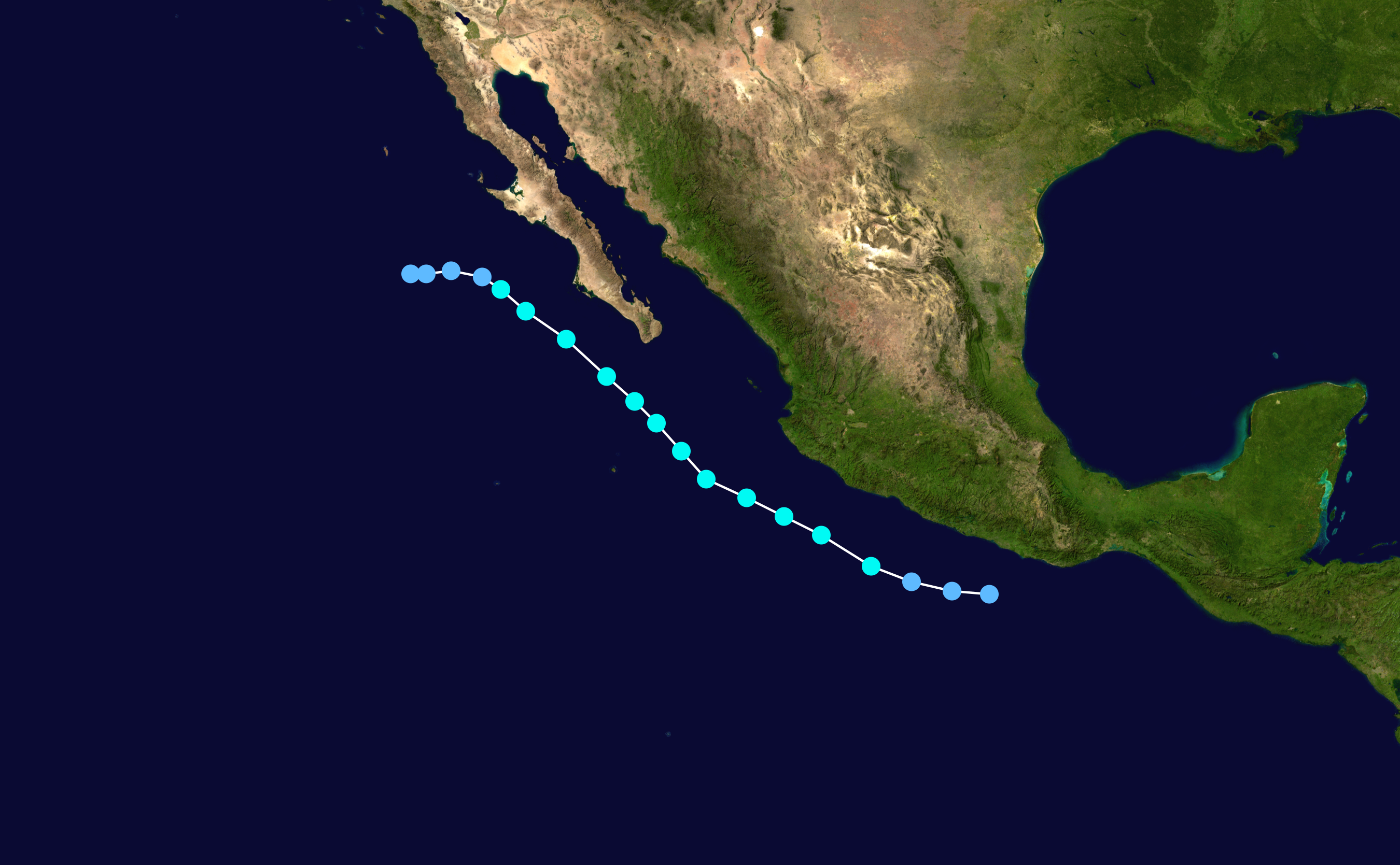
- Duration: September 10 – September 15
- Peak intensity: 50 mph (85 km/h) (1-min); 997 mbar (hPa)

A tropical wave exited western Africa on August 26, and continued across the Atlantic and into the eastern Pacific. The circulation began organizing near the southern Mexican coast on September 9. Moving offshore, it developed into Tropical Depression Ten-E on September 10, while located about 115 mi (185 km) southwest of Acapulco. The depression continued to the west-northwest, just offshore the southwest Mexican coast. On September 11, it strengthened into Tropical Storm Ivo, although it was affected by wind shear. A day later, Ivo reached peak winds of 50 mph (85 km/h), while the circulation was on the northern edge of the convection. Around that time, Ivo was located south of the Baja California peninsula, moving into an area of cooler waters. The storm weakened into a tropical depression on September 14, and degenerated into a remnant low early the next day.

Due to its passage near Mexico's southwest coast, the country's government issued tropical storm warnings from Acapulco to Cabo Corrientes, and for the southern Baja California peninsula from Cabo San Lucas to Cabo San Lazaro. Ivo's outer rainbands affected Guerrero, Michoacán, Colima, Jalisco, and Baja California Sur.

=== Hurricane Juliette ===
- Category 4 hurricane (SSHWS)
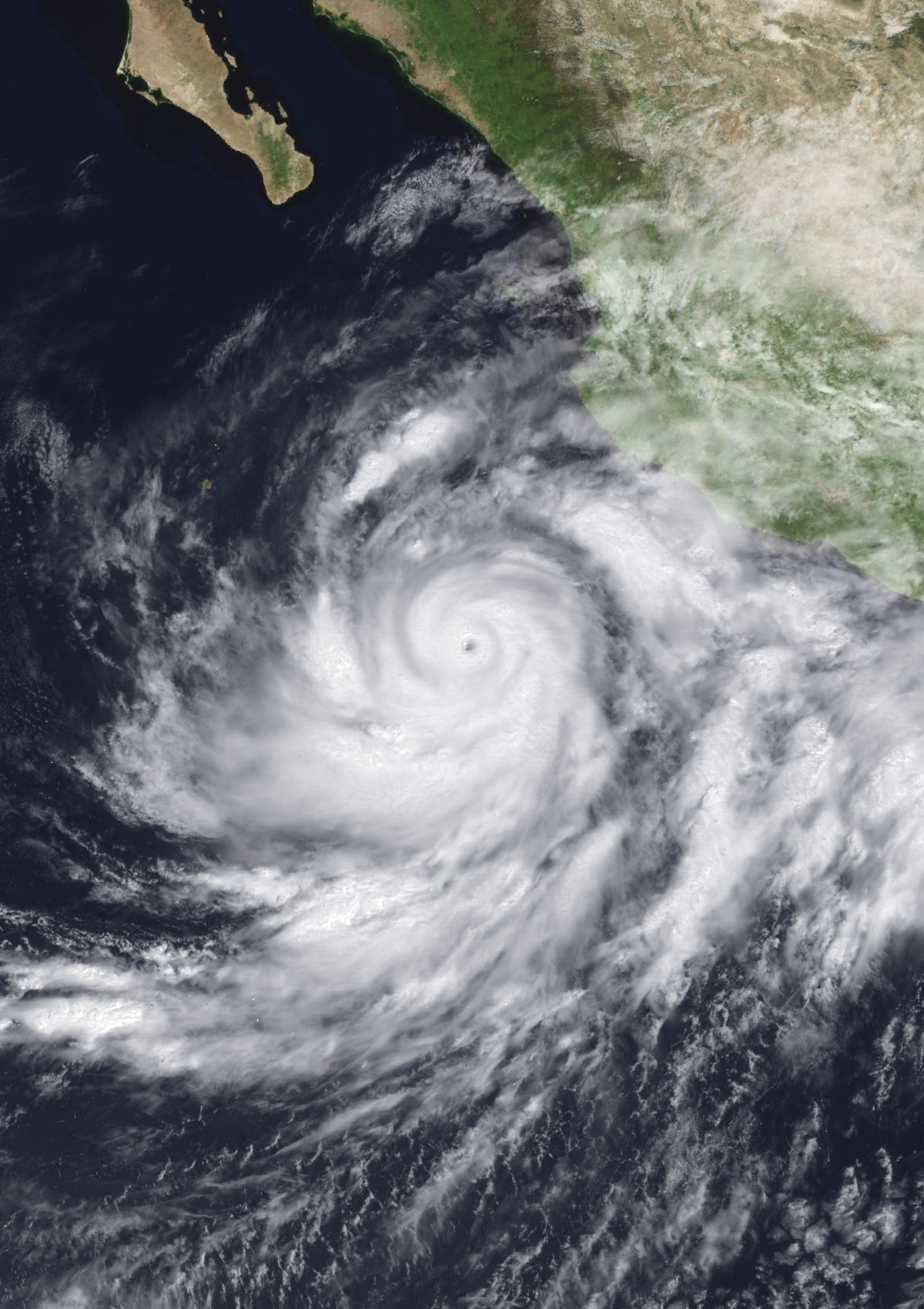
- Duration: September 21 – October 3
- Peak intensity: 145 mph (230 km/h) (1-min); 923 mbar (hPa)

A tropical wave exited western Africa on September 11, which crossed the Atlantic and Caribbean Sea. On September 19, it developed into Atlantic Tropical Depression Nine, which quickly dissipated while crossing Central America. After reaching the eastern Pacific, the remnants redeveloped into a tropical depression on September 21, located about 165 km (105 mi) south of Guatemala. It strengthened into Tropical Storm Juliette and continued to intensify, as it paralleled Mexico's Pacific coast. On September 23, Juliette became a hurricane, and it rapidly intensified into a Category 4 hurricane. The hurricane underwent an eyewall replacement cycle and briefly weakened before re-intensifying. On September 25, Juliette attained peak winds of 145 mph (230 km/h), with a minimum pressure of 923 mbar (27.3 inHg). Cooler waters and stronger wind shear caused it to weaken again. On September 28, Juliette passed just west of Cabo San Lucas as a minimal hurricane, before making landfall near San Carlos as a minimal tropical storm two days later. Juliette crossed the Baja California Peninsula into Gulf of California as a tropical depression and dissipated over the far northern part of the gulf on October 3.

During its path across the Pacific, Juliette affected much of the Pacific coast of Mexico, killing 13 people from Chiapas to the Baja California peninsula. The strongest winds and heaviest rainfall occurred in Baja California Sur, with wind gusts of 174 km/h (108 mph), and a precipitation total of 1,011 mm (39.80 in) recorded at Santiago. Damage in the country was estimated at over US$400 million, of which the worst effects were in the state of Sonora. There, the rains over three days equaled the average annual precipitation, which resulted in flooding and landslides. Thunderstorms extended into the southwestern United States, knocking down power lines near Palm Springs.

=== Hurricane Kiko ===
- Category 1 hurricane (SSHWS)
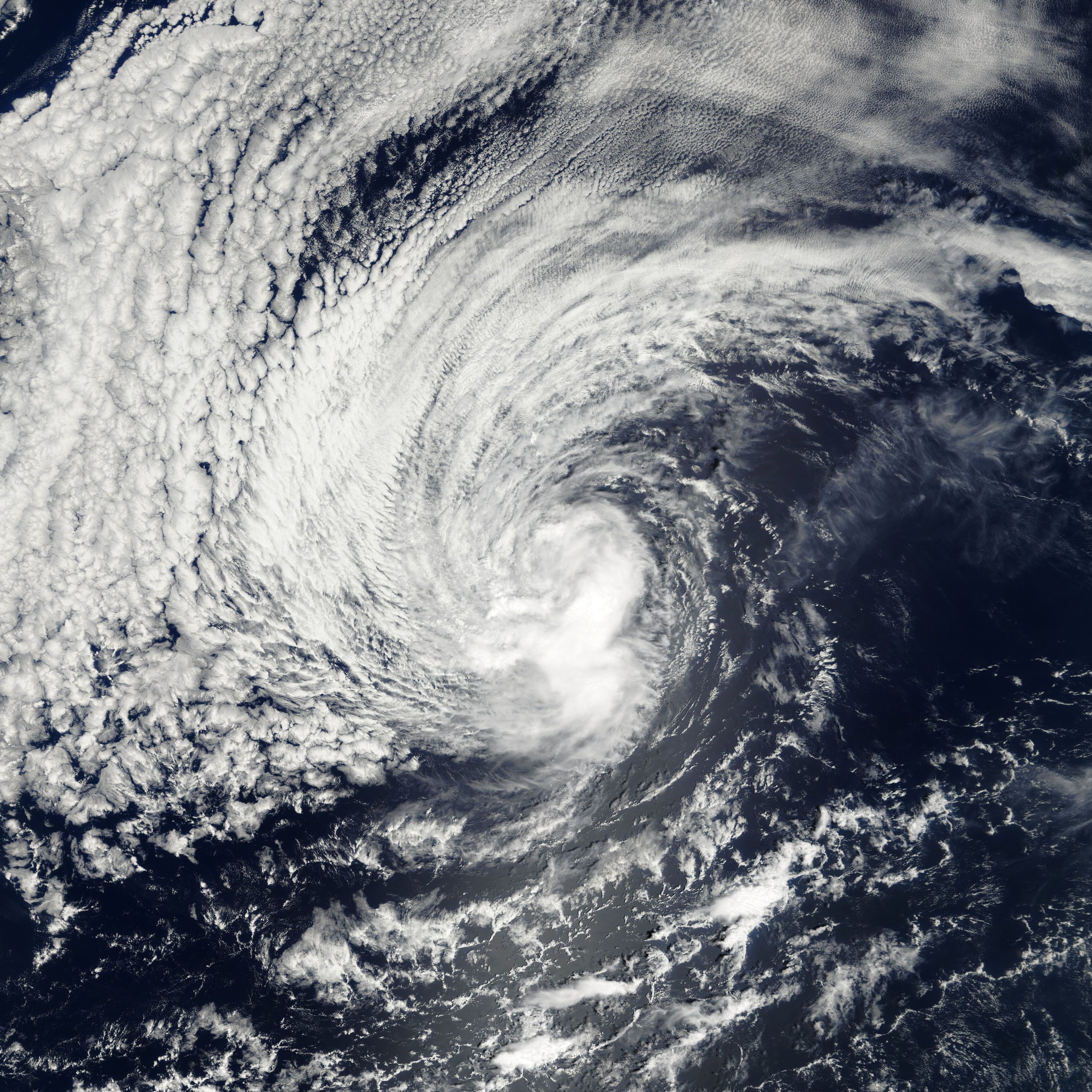
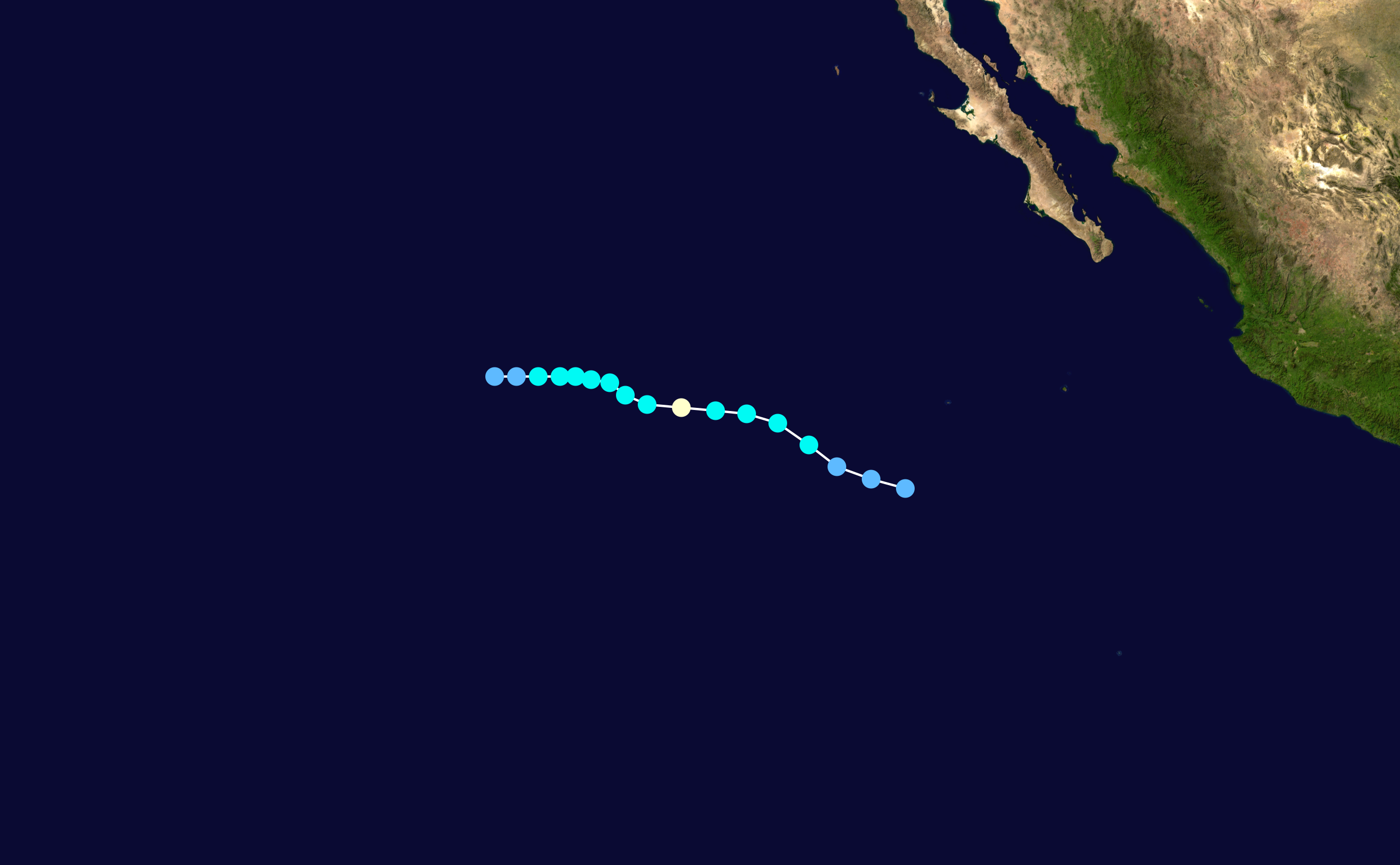
- Duration: September 21 – September 25
- Peak intensity: 75 mph (120 km/h) (1-min); 990 mbar (hPa)

The same tropical wave that produced Atlantic Hurricane Felix later entered the eastern Pacific by September 16. Convection increased as it moved westward, eventually becoming more consolidated. On September 21, the system organized into Tropical Depression Twelve-E, located about 635 mi (1,020 km) southwest of the southern tip of Baja California. Due to easterly wind shear, the system slowly organized, strengthening into Tropical Storm Kay on September 22. Deep convection persisted near the center, and an eye feature developed. On September 23, Kay briefly attained hurricane status, with peak winds of 75 mph (120 km/h) and an estimated minimum pressure of 990 mbar (29 inHg). Soon after peaking in intensity, Kay weakened due to stable air as the thunderstorms dwindled. On September 25, the storm fell to tropical depression status and quickly degenerated into a remnant low. The circulation continued westward for the next few days until it was absorbed by a frontal system northeast of Hawaii on October 1.

=== Tropical Storm Lorena ===
- Tropical storm (SSHWS)
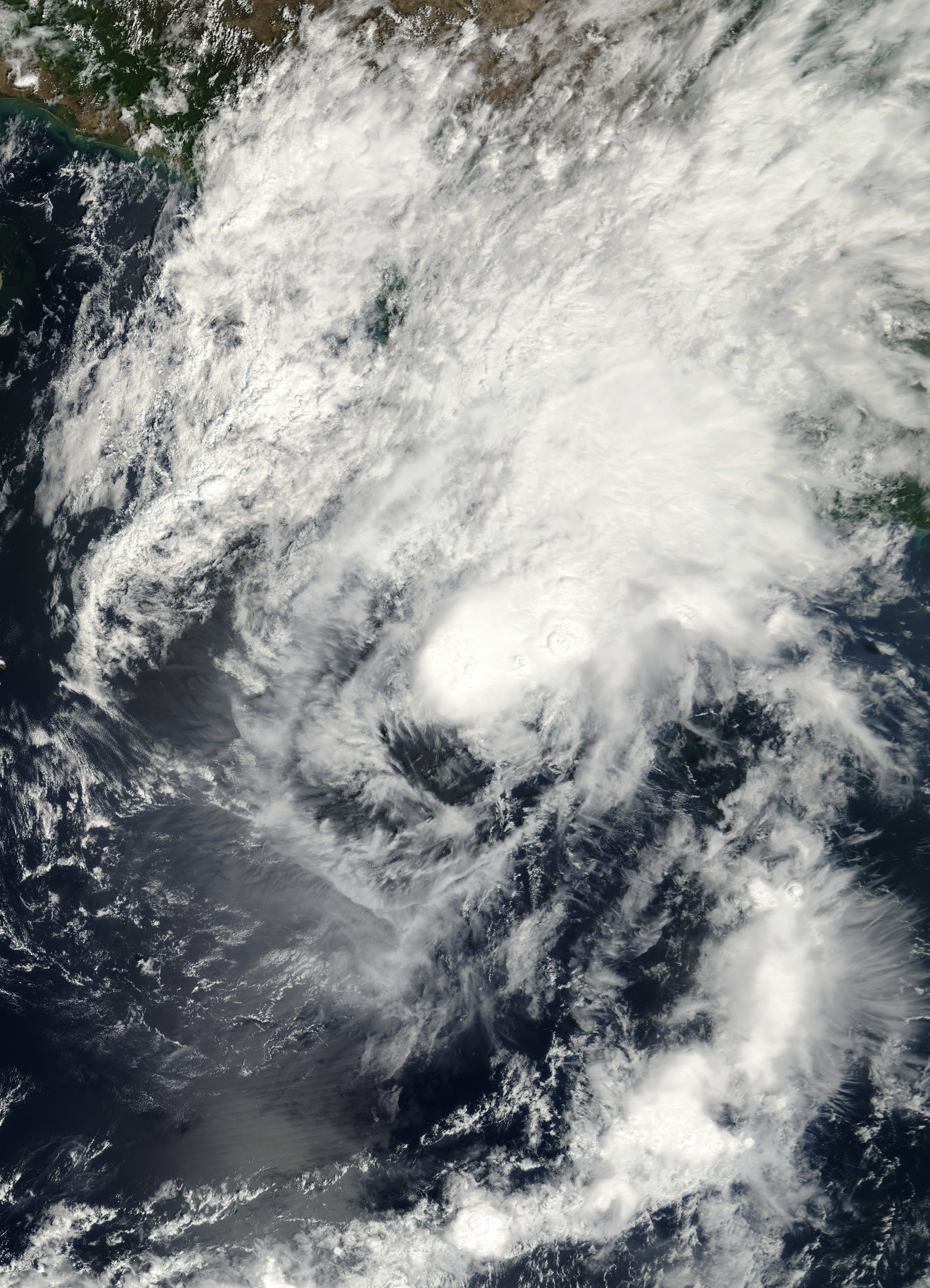
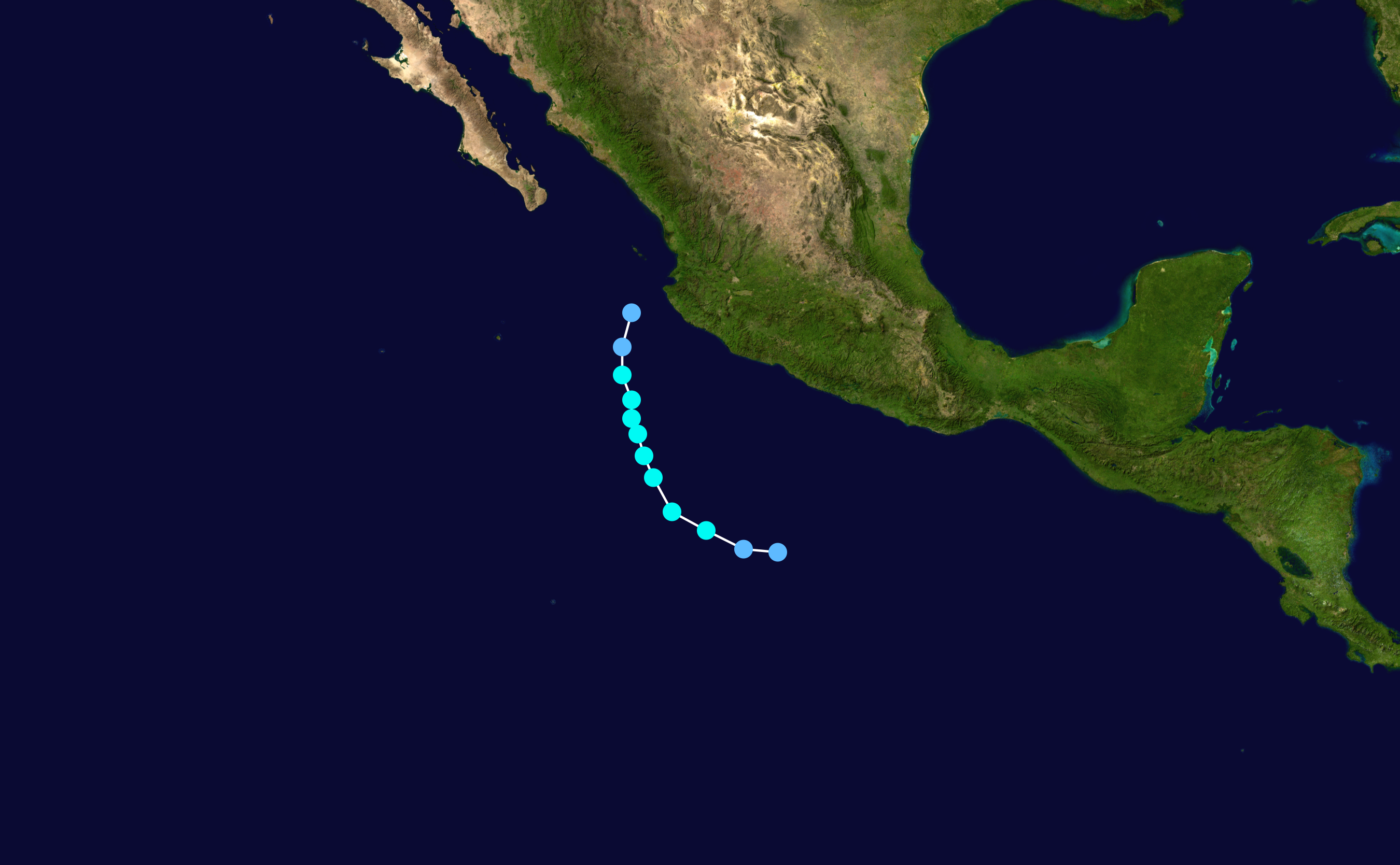
- Duration: October 2 – October 4
- Peak intensity: 60 mph (95 km/h) (1-min); 997 mbar (hPa)

A tropical wave exited western Africa on September 13, and crossed Central America two weeks later. Continuing to the west, the thunderstorms and gradually organized. On October 2, Tropical Depression 13-E formed about 370 mi (600 km) south-southwest of Acapulco, Mexico. Within 12 hours of developing, the depression strengthened into Tropical Storm Lorena as it moved to the northwest. On October 3, Lorena attained peak winds of 60 mph (95 km/h), and a minimum pressure of 997 mbar (29.4 inHg). Soon after, the convection began to weaken due to wind shear. The storm fell to tropical depression status on October 4, as the track shifted to the north. By October 5, Lorena was no longer classifiable as a tropical cyclone, and the circulation dissipated just west of Cabo Corrientes, Jalisco.

The storm led to a tropical storm warning and a hurricane watch, from Punta San Telmo northward to Mazatlán. Lorena's outer rainbands affected Jalisco and Nayarit.

=== Tropical Storm Manuel ===
- Tropical storm (SSHWS)
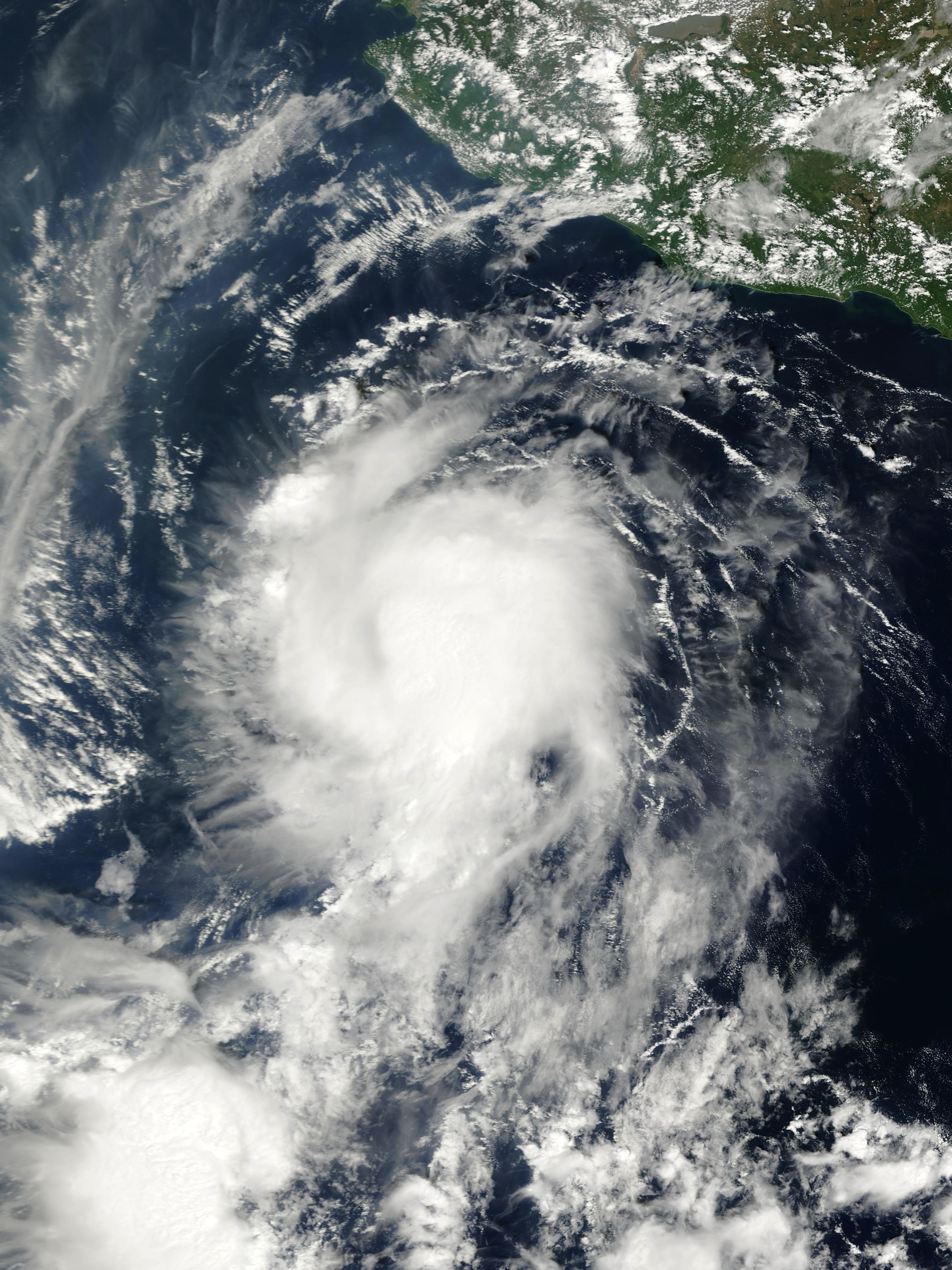
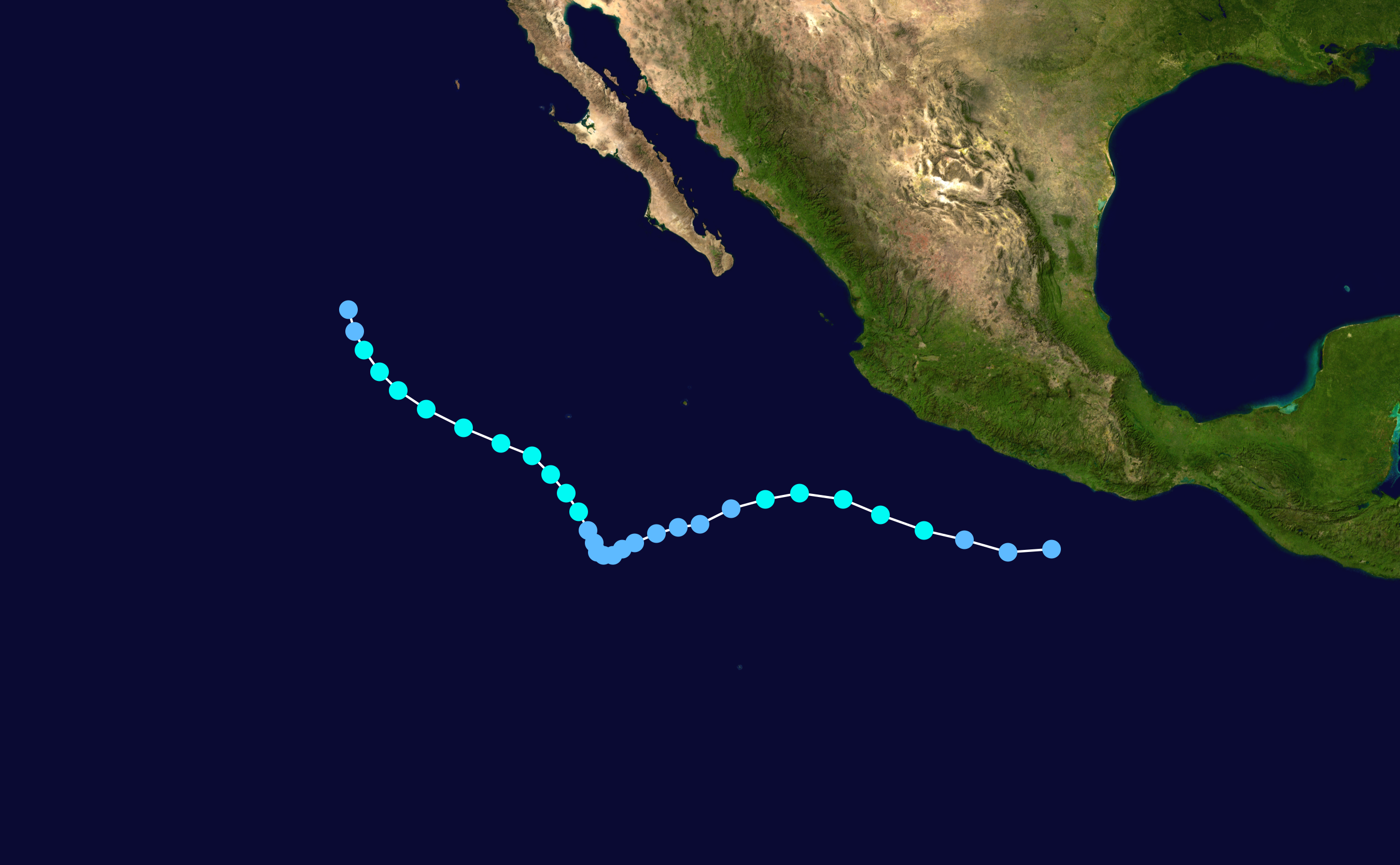
- Duration: October 10 – October 18
- Peak intensity: 60 mph (95 km/h) (1-min); 997 mbar (hPa)

On October 4, a tropical wave spawned a tropical depression in the Atlantic, which became Hurricane Iris. The hurricane struck Belize on October 9 and quickly dissipated over eastern Mexico. While Iris was dissipating, new convection was developing along Mexico's Pacific coast. The system continued westward and became Tropical Depression Fifteen-E on October 10, located about 200 mi (325 km) south-southeast of Acapulco. A day later, it strengthened into Tropical Storm Manuel, although it was soon disrupted by wind shear. On October 12, Manuel weakened to a tropical depression. The track shifted to the west-southwest as a ridge weakened to its north, until an upper-level trough turned the depression to the northwest. Manuel regained tropical storm strength on October 15, as convection increased. On the next day, the storm reached peak winds of 60 mph (95 km/h), with a minimum pressure of 997 mbar (29.4 inHg). Cooler waters and a return of wind shear caused the storm to weaken again. On October 17, Manuel weakened to a tropical depression, and it degenerated into a remnant low the next day. The circulation continued slowly westward for a few days until dissipating.

Manuel's outer rainbands affected coastal areas of southwest Mexico from Guerrero to Nayarit.

=== Hurricane Narda ===
- Category 1 hurricane (SSHWS)
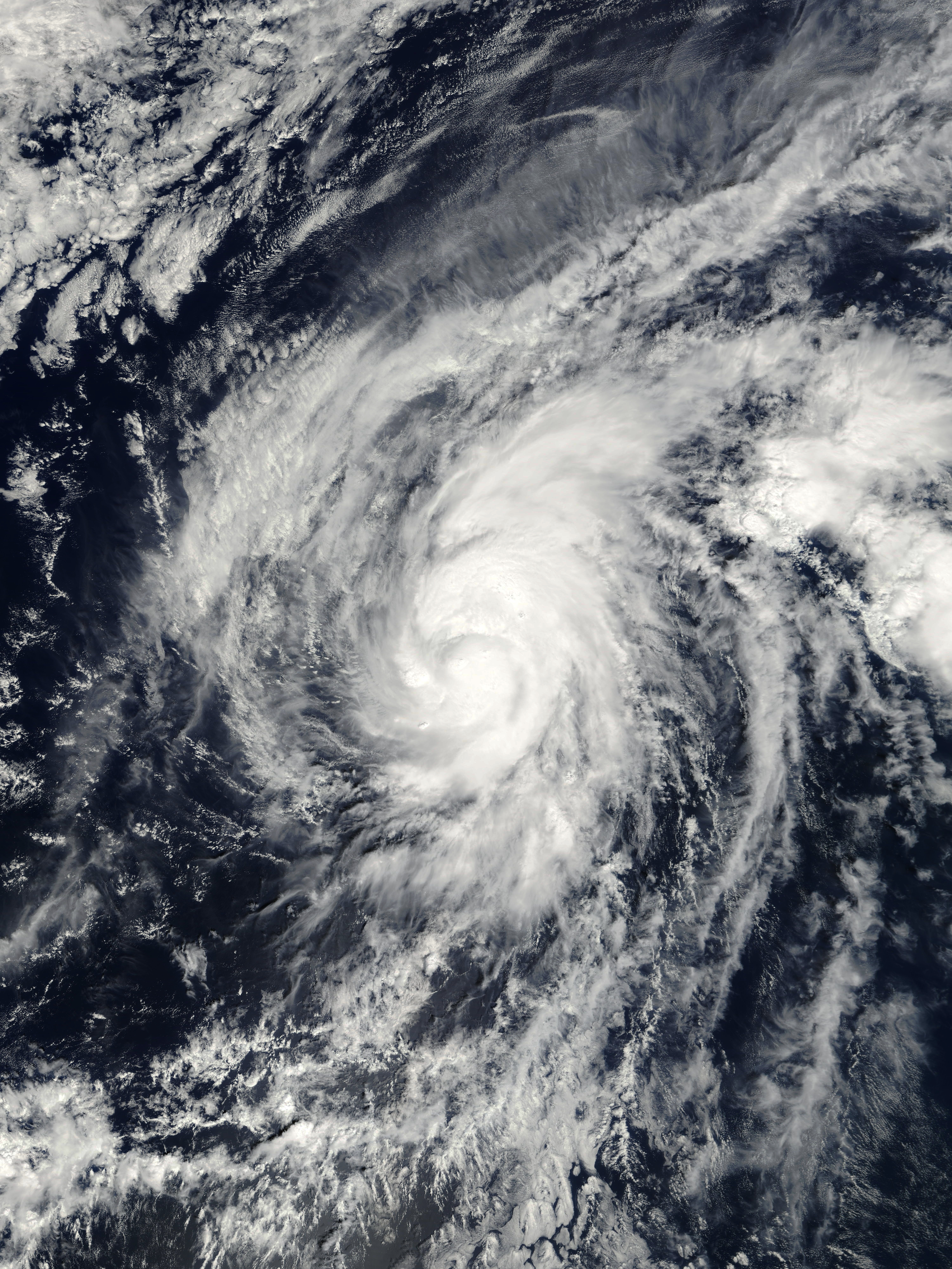
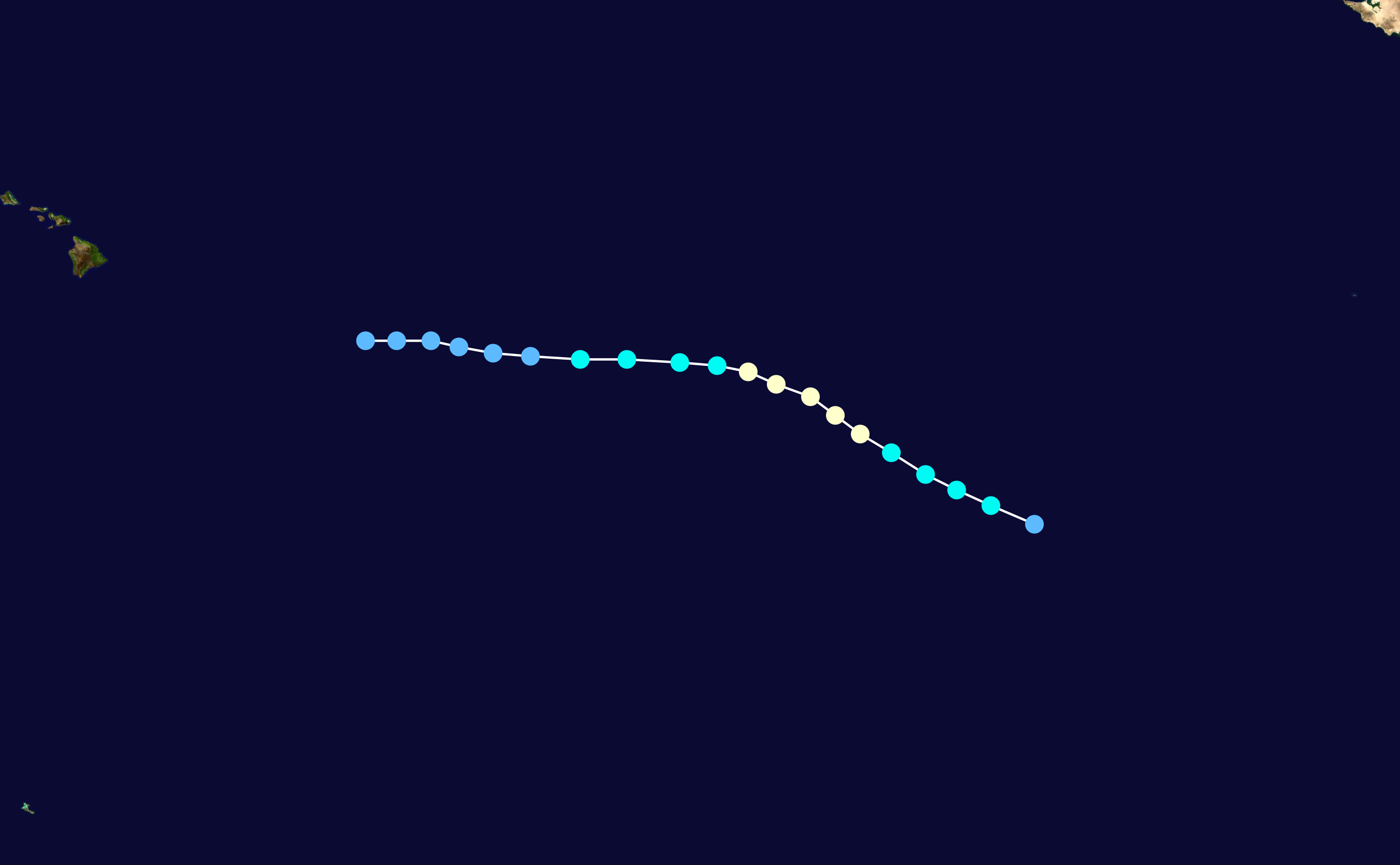
- Duration: October 20 – October 25
- Peak intensity: 85 mph (140 km/h) (1-min); 980 mbar (hPa)

A tropical wave exited Africa on October 3, and crossed Central America 12 days later. After reaching the eastern Pacific, the wave continued westward, developing banding features and several circulations. The system consolidated into Tropical Depression Sixteen-E on October 20, located about 1,320 mi (2,130 km) southwest of the southern tip of the Baja California peninsula. With warm waters, the depression quickly intensified into Tropical Storm Narda as it moved to the west-northwest. It developed outflow and deep thunderstorms, and after a ragged eye formed, Narda attained hurricane status late on October 21. On the next day, it reached peak winds of 85 mph (140 km/h) and a minimum pressure of 980 mbar (29 inHg). Narda remained a hurricane until October 23, when it weakened due to wind shear. Later that day, the storm crossed into the Central Pacific as it deteriorated further to a tropical depression. The circulation dissipated on October 25, about 575 mi (925 km) east-southeast of the island of Hawaii.

=== Hurricane Octave ===
- Category 1 hurricane (SSHWS)
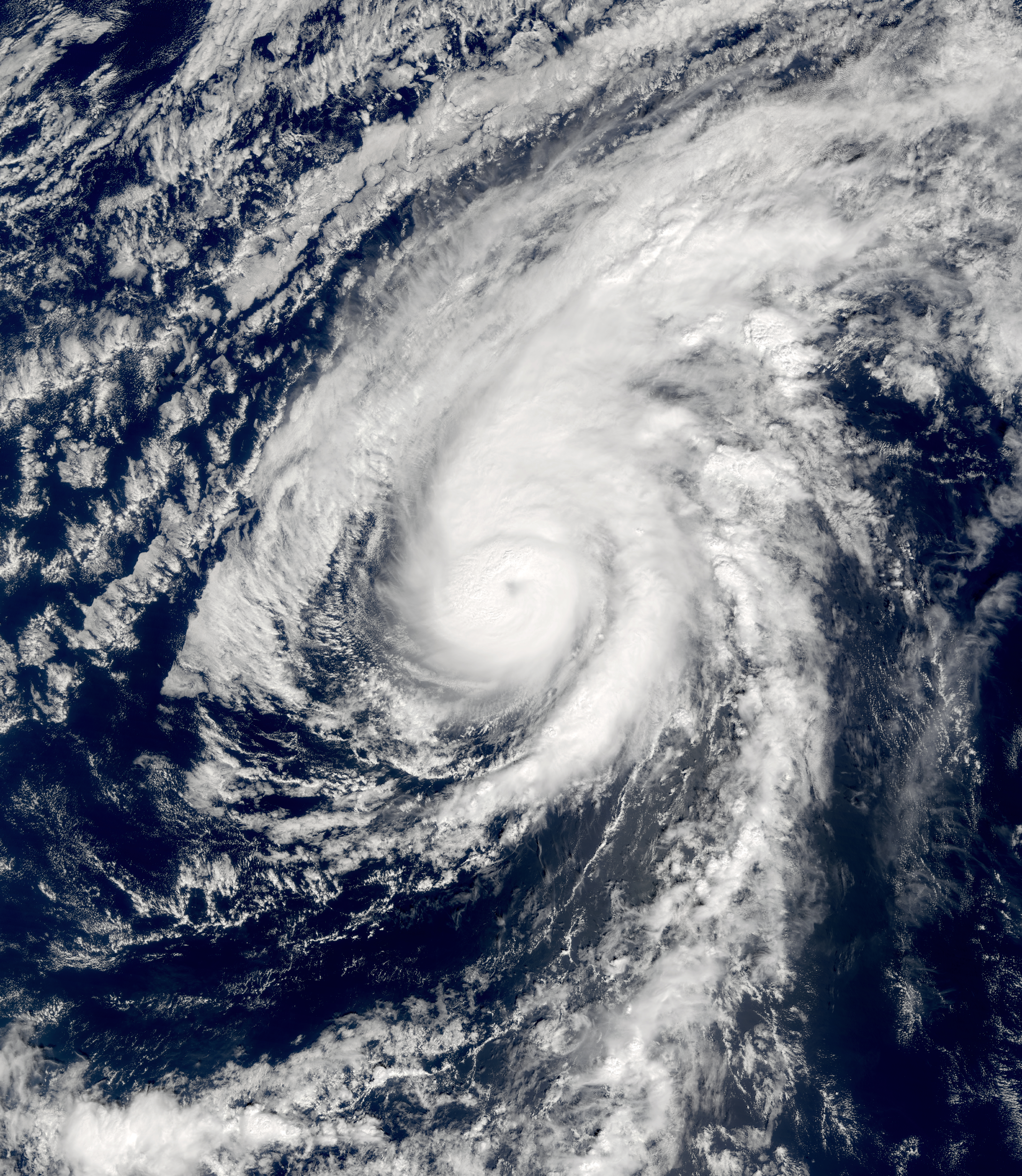
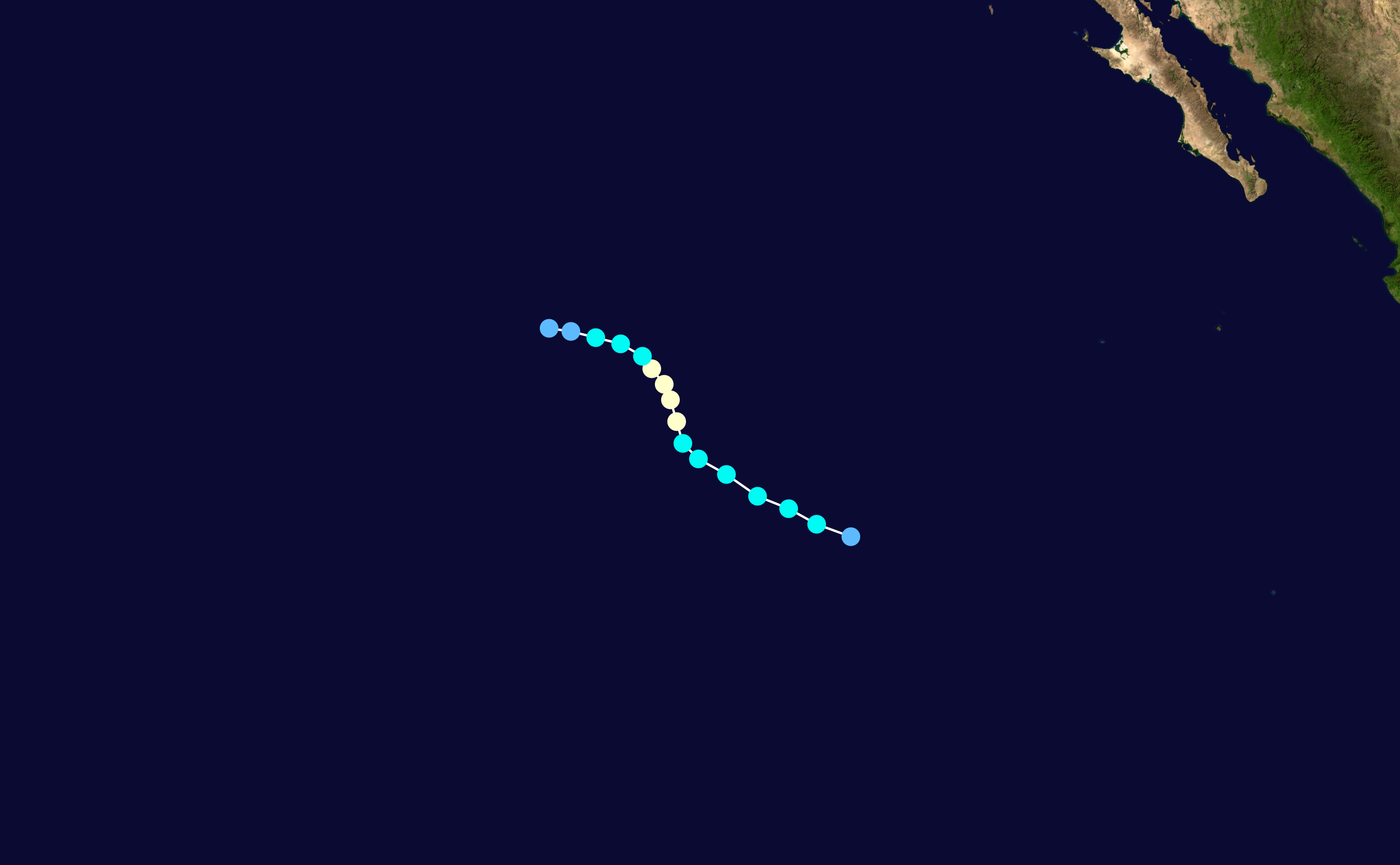
- Duration: October 31 – November 3
- Peak intensity: 85 mph (140 km/h) (1-min); 980 mbar (hPa)

The final storm of the season originated from an area of thunderstorms within the Intertropical Convergence Zone (ITCZ) that increased on October 27. Its origins were likely related to a tropical wave that crossed Central America five days prior. The system moved westward, developing into a tropical depression on October 31, located about 1,180 mi (1,900 km) southwest of the southern tip of Baja California. Moving to the northwest, it quickly strengthened into Tropical Storm Octave, amid low wind shear. A ragged eye developed on November 1, and that day, Octave attained hurricane status. On November 2, the hurricane reached peak winds of 85 mph (140 km/h) and a minimum barometric pressure of 980 mbar (29 inHg). Soon after, increased wind shear weakened Octave, while sea surface temperatures were decreasing, causing the circulation to become displaced from the deep convection. On November 3, Octave fell to tropical depression status as the thunderstorms dwindled and the circulation started dissipating.

=== Tropical depressions ===
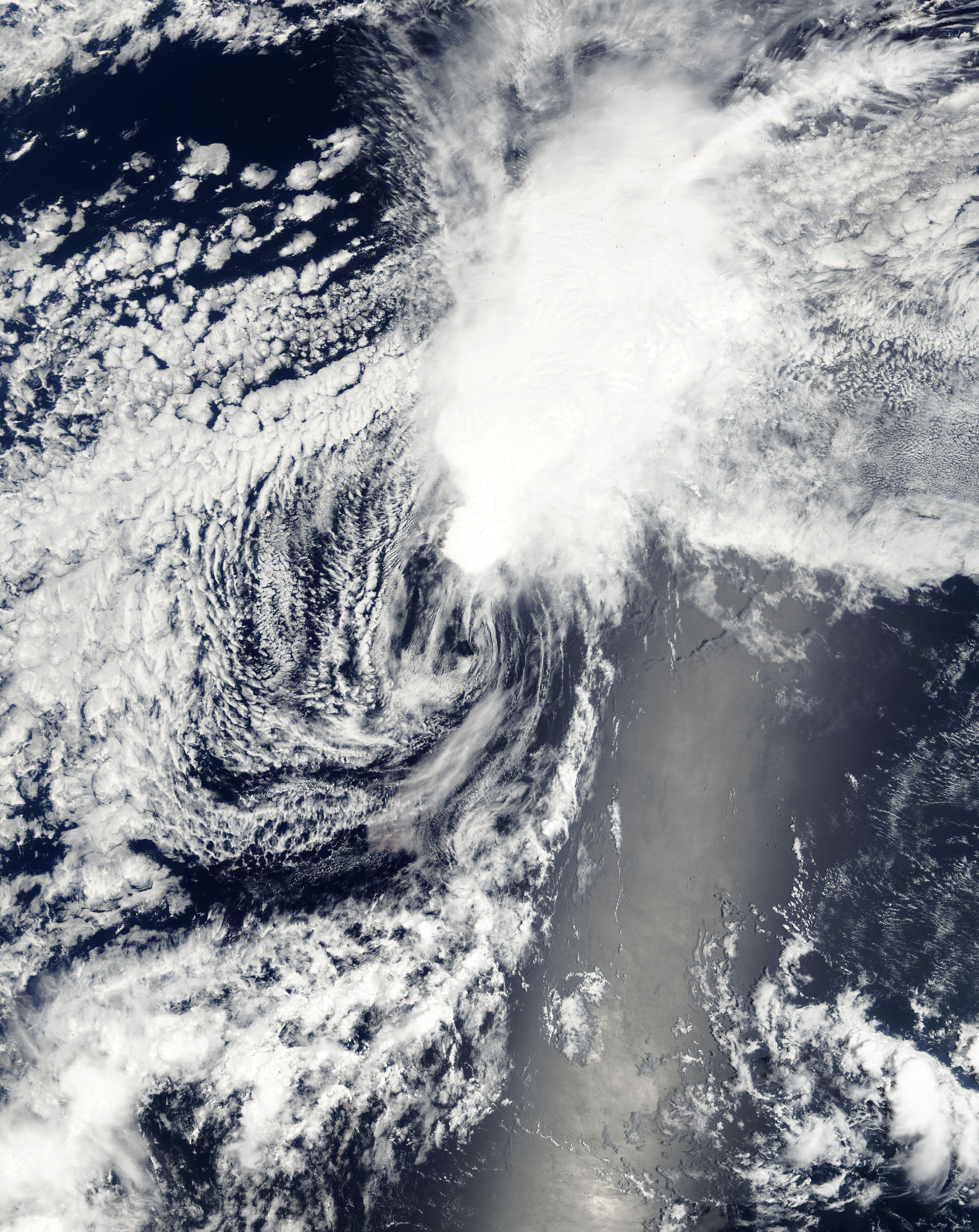
Satellite image of Tropical Depression Six-E to the southeast of Hawaii

A tropical wave entered the Pacific by August 13, and continued westward. It began to become better organized on August 21. A day later, it developed into Tropical Depression Six-E about 1,300 mi (2,090 km) southeast of Hawaii. The depression attained peak winds of 35 mph (55 km/h), before being affected by cooler waters and stronger wind shear. Early on August 24, the circulation dissipated.

On September 11, Tropical Depression One-C developed about 415 mi (665 km) southeast of the island of Hawaii. The depression attained peak winds of 35 mph (55 km/h), although it never became well-organized, and the track was erratic. It dissipated about 12 hours after forming.

Tropical Depression Two-C formed on September 22, located southwest of Tropical Storm Kiko, and about 820 mi (1,320 km) southeast of the island of Hawaii. Upon its formation, the depression had peak winds of 35 mph (55 km/h). (Note: The official report by the Central Pacific Hurricane Center assessed a peak intensity of 35 mph (55 km/h). However, the Northeast and North Central Pacific hurricane database classified it as a 40 mph (65 km/h) tropical storm.) As it moved westward, strong wind shear prevented strengthening, and the depression dissipated on September 25 to the southwest of Hawaii.

The final undeveloped depression originated from the Intertropical Convergence Zone. Moving westward, its thunderstorms became better organized, developing into Tropical Depression Fourteen-E on October 3. At the time, it was located about 920 mi (1,480 km) southwest of the southern tip of the Baja California peninsula. Affected by wind shear and dry air, the depression dissipated on October 4.

== Storm names ==
The following list of names was used for named storms that formed in the North Pacific east of 140°W during 2001. This is the same list used for the 1995 season except for Ivo, which ultimately replaced Ismael. The season's naming list originally had the name Israel replace Ismael, before being changed during the season. A storm was named Ivo for the first time in 2001.

No named storms formed in the central North Pacific in 2001. Named storms that crossed into the area during the year are noted (*).

- Adolph
- Barbara *
- Cosme
- Dalila
- Erick
- Flossie
- Gil
- Henriette
- Ivo
- Juliette
- Kiko
- Lorena
- Manuel
- Narda *
- Octave
- Priscilla (unused)
- Raymond (unused)
- Sonia (unused)
- Tico (unused)
- Velma (unused)
- Wallis (unused)
- Xina (unused)
- York (unused)
- Zelda (unused)

=== Retirement ===
The name Adolph was retired following its usage in 2001, was replaced with Alvin starting with the 2007 season.

== Season effects ==
This is a table of all of the tropical cyclones that formed in the 2001 Pacific hurricane season. It includes their name, duration (within the basin), peak classification and intensities, areas affected, damage, and death totals. Deaths in parentheses are additional and indirect (an example of an indirect death would be a traffic accident), but were still related to that storm. Damage and deaths include totals while the storm was extratropical, a wave, or a low, and all of the damage figures are in 2001 USD.

Saffir–Simpson scale
TD	TS	C1	C2	C3	C4	C5

2001 Pacific hurricane season statistics
Storm name	Dates active	Storm category at peak intensity	Max 1-min wind mph (km/h)	Min. press. (mbar)	Areas affected	Damage (US$)	Deaths	Ref(s).
Adolph	May 25 – June 1	Category 4 hurricane	145 (230)	940	None	None	None	
Barbara	June 20 – 26	Tropical storm	60 (95)	997	Hawaiian Islands	None	None	
Cosme	July 13 – 15	Tropical storm	45 (75)	1000	None	None	None	
Erick	July 20 – 24	Tropical storm	40 (65)	1001	None	None	None	
Dalila	July 21 – 28	Category 1 hurricane	75 (120)	987	Southwestern Mexico, Baja California Peninsula	Unknown	2	
Six-E	August 22 – 24	Tropical depression	35 (55)	1006	None	None	None	
Flossie	August 26 – September 2	Category 2 hurricane	105 (165)	972	Northwestern Mexico	$35,000	2	
Gil	September 4 – 11	Category 2 hurricane	100 (155)	975	None	None	None	
Henriette	September 4 – 8	Tropical storm	65 (100)	994	None	None	None	
One-C	September 10 – 11	Tropical depression	35 (55)	1005	None	None	None	
Ivo	September 10 – 14	Tropical storm	50 (85)	997	Southwestern Mexico, Baja California Peninsula	None	None	
Juliette	September 21 – October 3	Category 4 hurricane	145 (230)	923	Western Mexico, Southwest United States	$400 million	13	
Kiko	September 21 – 25	Category 1 hurricane	75 (120)	989	None	None	None	
Two-C	September 23 – 25	Tropical depression	35 (55)	1008	None	None	None	
Lorena	October 2 – 4	Tropical storm	65 (100)	996	Southwestern Mexico	None	None	
Fourteen-E	October 3 – 4	Tropical depression	35 (55)	1007	None	None	None	
Manuel	October 10 – 18	Tropical storm	60 (95)	997	None	None	None	
Narda	October 20 – 25	Category 1 hurricane	85 (140)	979	None	None	None	
Octave	October 31 – November 3	Category 1 hurricane	85 (140)	980	None	None	None	
Season aggregates
19 systems	May 25 – November 3		145 (230)	923		$400 million	17	

== See also ==
- Tropical cyclones in 2001
- List of Pacific hurricanes
- Pacific hurricane season
- 2001 Atlantic hurricane season
- 2001 Pacific typhoon season
- 2001 North Indian Ocean cyclone season
- South-West Indian Ocean cyclone seasons: 2000–01, 2001–02
- Australian region cyclone seasons: 2000–01, 2001–02
- South Pacific cyclone seasons: 2000–01, 2001–02
