= Santiago, Baja California Sur =

Santiago
- Location in Mexico
- Coordinates: 23°28′55″N 109°43′06″W
- Country: Mexico
- State: Baja California Sur
- Elevation: 390 ft (120 m)

Population (2010)
  - City: 752
  - Urban: 0

Santiago (Spanish: [sanˈtjaɣo]; previously Aiñiní) is a small town in Los Cabos Municipality in Baja California Sur, Mexico, located on Mexico's Highway 1, about an hour's drive north of San José del Cabo. Like Todos Santos it is almost directly on top of the Tropic of Cancer.

The Misión Santiago de Los Coras in Aiñiní was founded in 1724 by the Jesuit missionary, Ignacio Maria Napoli, and closed in 1795; the subsequent Church of Santiago Apostol was built nearby.

== Climate ==
Climate data for Santiago, Baja California Sur (1991–2020 normals, extremes 1937–present)
| Month | Jan | Feb | Mar | Apr | May | Jun | Jul | Aug | Sep | Oct | Nov | Dec | Year |
|---|---|---|---|---|---|---|---|---|---|---|---|---|---|
| Record high °C (°F) | 35.5 (95.9) | 39 (102) | 39.5 (103.1) | 41.5 (106.7) | 43.5 (110.3) | 44 (111) | 44 (111) | 48 (118) | 43.5 (110.3) | 42 (108) | 39 (102) | 37.5 (99.5) | 48 (118) |
| Mean daily maximum °C (°F) | 26.3 (79.3) | 27.6 (81.7) | 29.9 (85.8) | 32.1 (89.8) | 34.8 (94.6) | 37.0 (98.6) | 37.3 (99.1) | 36.7 (98.1) | 35.1 (95.2) | 34.4 (93.9) | 30.6 (87.1) | 26.7 (80.1) | 32.4 (90.3) |
| Daily mean °C (°F) | 16.7 (62.1) | 17.5 (63.5) | 19.3 (66.7) | 21.5 (70.7) | 24.5 (76.1) | 28.4 (83.1) | 30.1 (86.2) | 29.9 (85.8) | 28.5 (83.3) | 26.0 (78.8) | 21.7 (71.1) | 17.6 (63.7) | 23.5 (74.3) |
| Mean daily minimum °C (°F) | 7.0 (44.6) | 7.4 (45.3) | 8.8 (47.8) | 10.8 (51.4) | 14.2 (57.6) | 19.7 (67.5) | 22.8 (73.0) | 23.2 (73.8) | 21.9 (71.4) | 17.7 (63.9) | 12.7 (54.9) | 8.5 (47.3) | 14.6 (58.3) |
| Record low °C (°F) | −3 (27) | −2 (28) | −5 (23) | 0 (32) | 4.5 (40.1) | 2 (36) | 11.5 (52.7) | 12 (54) | 2 (36) | 8 (46) | 3 (37) | 0 (32) | −5 (23) |
| Average precipitation mm (inches) | 8.1 (0.32) | 5.0 (0.20) | 2.7 (0.11) | 0.2 (0.01) | 0.2 (0.01) | 0.4 (0.02) | 28.7 (1.13) | 103.8 (4.09) | 133.8 (5.27) | 30.7 (1.21) | 16.4 (0.65) | 6.5 (0.26) | 336.5 (13.25) |
| Average rainy days | 1.6 | 0.8 | 0.5 | 0.1 | 0.4 | 0.4 | 2.7 | 5.9 | 6.5 | 2.5 | 1.5 | 1.2 | 24.1 |
Source: Servicio Meteorológico Nacional
