= Timeline of the 2001 Pacific hurricane season =

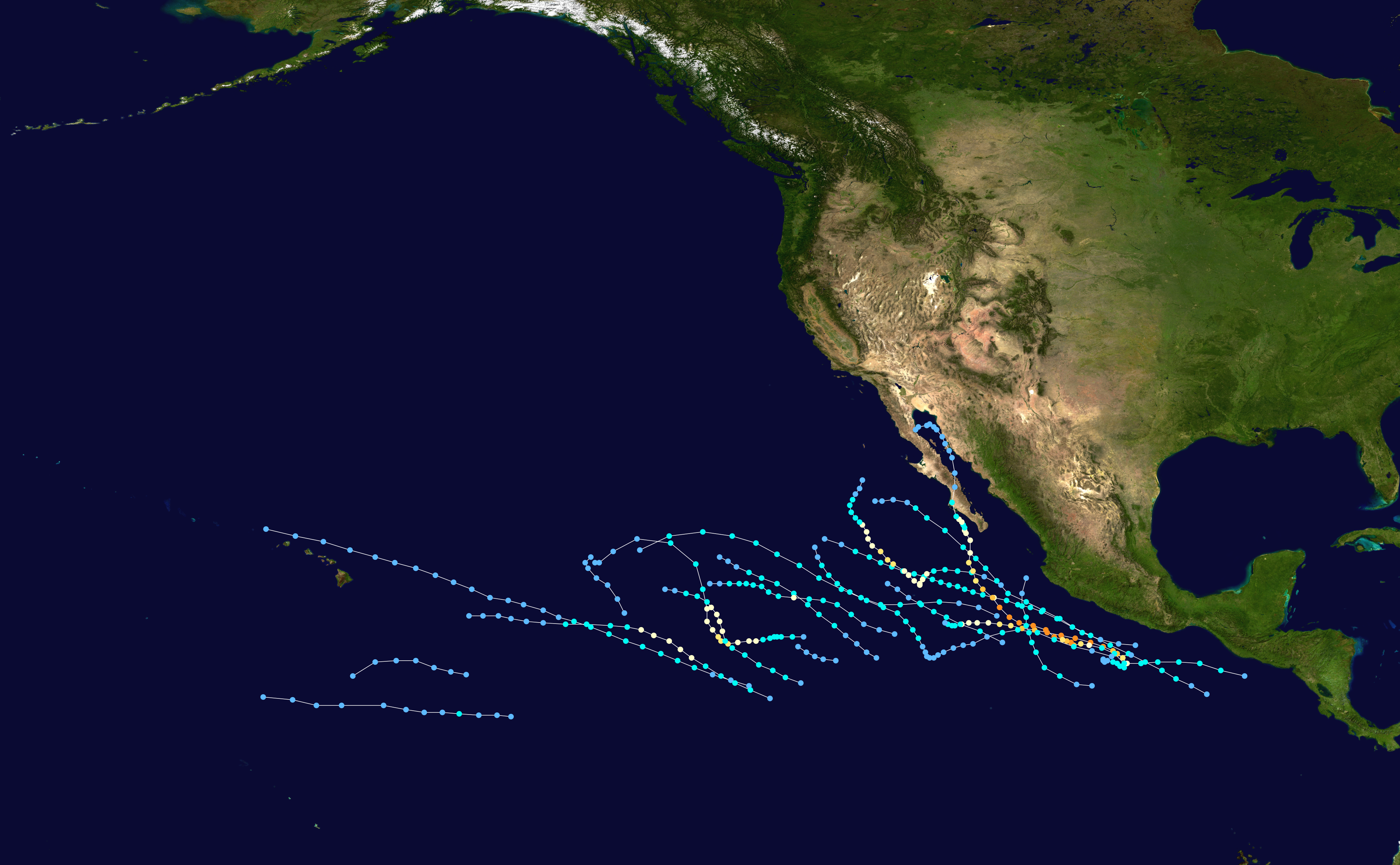
- Season summary map

Season boundaries
- First system formed: May 25, 2001
- Last system dissipated: November 3, 2001

Strongest system
- Name: Juliette
- Maximum winds: 145 mph (230 km/h)
- Lowest pressure: 923 mbar (hPa; 27.26 inHg)

Longest lasting system
- Name: Juliette
- Duration: 12 days
Storm articles
- Hurricane Juliette (2001)

The 2001 Pacific hurricane season was the annual cycle of tropical cyclone formation over the Pacific Ocean north of the equator and east of the International Date Line (IDL). The season officially began on May 15 in the Eastern Pacific proper (east of 140°W) and June 1 in the Central Pacific (140°W to the IDL), and ended on November 30 in both areas. This is historically the period during which most tropical cyclogenesis occurs in these respective areas. The season's first system, Hurricane Adolph, developed on May 25; its last, Hurricane Octave, dissipated on November 3.

Activity during the 2001 season was close to average. (Note: During the period from 1991 to 2020, an average Pacific hurricane season generated fifteen tropical storms, eight hurricanes, and four major hurricanes.) Fifteen named tropical storms formed, of which eight became hurricanes and two further intensified into major hurricanes—Category 3 or higher on the five-level Saffir–Simpson scale. The season also produced four tropical depressions that failed to attain tropical storm status. Four weak tropical cyclones existed in the Central Pacific, with two forming in the region and two entering from the Eastern Pacific. Hurricane Juliette made the season's only landfall when it came ashore the Baja California peninsula as a minimal tropical storm in late September, though it produced hurricane conditions near Cabo San Lucas while its center was still offshore.

This timeline documents tropical cyclone formations, strengthenings, weakenings, landfalls, and dissipations during the season. It includes information that was not released during the season, meaning that data from post-storm reviews by the National Hurricane Center and the Central Pacific Hurricane Center has been included.

The time stamp for each event is first stated using Coordinated Universal Time (UTC), the 24-hour clock where 00:00 = midnight UTC. The NHC uses both UTC and the time zone where the center of the tropical cyclone was then located. Prior to 2015, two time zones were utilized in the Eastern Pacific basin: Pacific for the Eastern Pacific, and Hawaii−Aleutian for the Central Pacific. In this timeline, the respective area time is included in parentheses. Additionally, figures for maximum sustained winds and position estimates are rounded to the nearest 5 units (miles or kilometers), following NHC practice. Direct wind observations are rounded to the nearest whole number. Atmospheric pressures are listed to the nearest millibar and nearest hundredth of an inch of mercury.

== Timeline of events ==
=== May ===
May 15

- The 2001 Eastern Pacific hurricane season officially begins.

May 25

- 18:00 UTC (11:00 a.m. PDT) at 13.6°N 101.1°W – Tropical Depression One-E forms from a tropical wave about 240 mi (390 km) south-southwest of Acapulco, Guerrero.

May 26

- 18:00 UTC (11:00 a.m. PDT) at 13.6°N 100.5°W – Tropical Depression One-E strengthens into Tropical Storm Adolph about 230 mi (370 km) south-southwest of Acapulco.

May 27

- 18:00 UTC (11:00 a.m. PDT) at 13.5°N 99.5°W – Tropical Storm Adolph strengthens into a Category 1 hurricane about 235 mi (380 km) south of Acapulco.

May 28

- 00:00 UTC (5:00 p.m. PDT, May 27) at 13.9°N 99.8°W – Hurricane Adolph strengthens to Category 2 intensity about 205 mi (335 km) south of Acapulco.
- 06:00 UTC (11:00 p.m. PDT, May 27) at 14.2°N 100.2°W – Hurricane Adolph strengthens to Category 3 intensity about 185 mi (295 km) south of Acapulco.
- 18:00 UTC (11:00 a.m. PDT) at 14.7°N 101.2°W – Hurricane Adolph strengthens to Category 4 intensity about 175 mi (280 km) south-southwest of Acapulco.

May 29

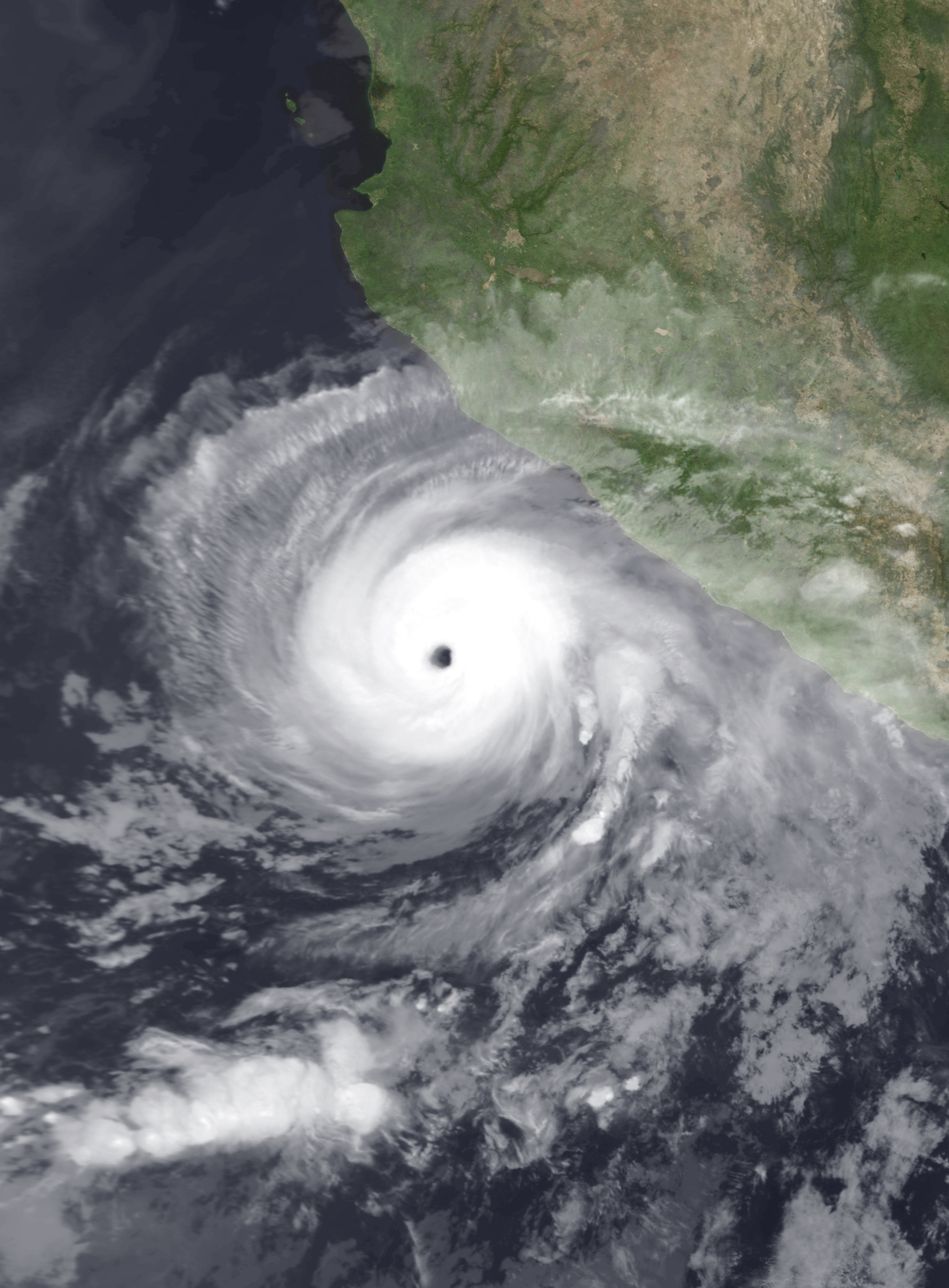
Hurricane Adolph at peak intensity early on May 29

- 00:00 UTC (5:00 p.m. PDT, May 28) at 15.0°N 102.1°W – Hurricane Adolph attains its peak intensity, with maximum sustained winds of 145 mph (230 km/h) and a minimum central pressure of 940 mbar (27.76 inHg), about 195 mi (315 km) southwest of Acapulco. This makes it, at the time, the strongest recorded Pacific hurricane in May.

May 30

- 00:00 UTC (5:00 p.m. PDT, May 29) at 15.9°N 106.1°W – Hurricane Adolph weakens to Category 3 intensity about 420 mi (675 km) west of Acapulco.
- 12:00 UTC (5:00 a.m. PDT) at 16.2°N 107.8°W – Hurricane Adolph weakens to Category 2 intensity about 525 mi (845 km) west of Acapulco, or about 485 mi (780 km) south-southeast of Cabo San Lucas, Baja California Sur.

May 31

- 00:00 UTC (5:00 p.m. PDT, May 30) at 16.4°N 109.4°W – Hurricane Adolph weakens to Category 1 intensity about 450 mi (720 km) south of Cabo San Lucas.

=== June ===
June 1

- The 2001 Central Pacific hurricane season officially begins.
- 00:00 UTC (5:00 p.m. PDT, May 31) at 16.2°N 111.8°W – Hurricane Adolph weakens into a tropical storm about 480 mi (770 km) south-southwest of Cabo San Lucas.
- 18:00 UTC (11:00 a.m. PDT) at 16.4°N 112.5°W – Tropical Storm Adolph weakens into a tropical depression about 480 mi (770 km) south-southwest of Cabo San Lucas, dissipating shortly thereafter.

June 20

- 00:00 UTC (5:00 p.m. PDT, June 19) at 11.9°N 126.5°W – Tropical Depression Two-E forms from a tropical wave about 1,325 mi (2,130 km) southwest of Cabo San Lucas.
- 18:00 UTC (11:00 a.m. PDT) at 13.2°N 130.4°W – Tropical Depression Two-E strengthens into Tropical Storm Barbara about 1,495 mi (2,410 km) west-southwest of Cabo San Lucas.

June 21

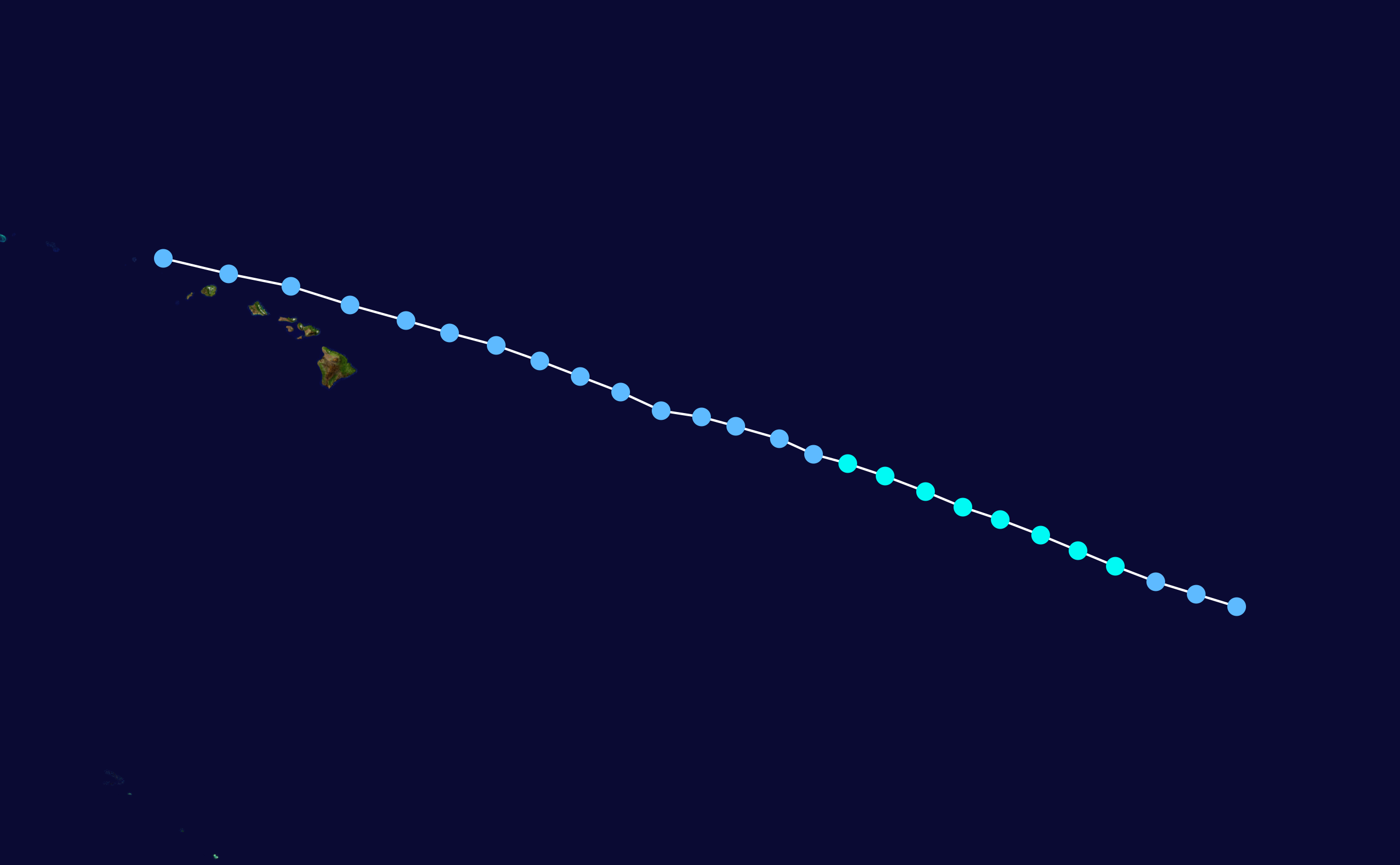
Storm path of Tropical Storm Barbara

- 12:00 UTC (5:00 a.m. PDT) at 14.7°N 134.1°W – Tropical Storm Barbara attains its peak intensity, with maximum sustained winds of 60 mph (95 km/h) and a minimum central pressure of 997 mbar (29.44 inHg), about 1,675 mi (2,695 km) west-southwest of Cabo San Lucas.

June 22

- 18:00 UTC (8:00 a.m. HST) at 16.8°N 140.1°W – Tropical Storm Barbara weakens into a tropical depression about 985 mi (1,585 km) east of Cape Kumukahi Light in Hawaii, as it crosses 140°W into the Central Pacific basin.

June 26

- 06:00 UTC (8:00 p.m. HST, June 25) at 23.1°N 161.0°W – Tropical Depression Barbara is last noted as a tropical cyclone about 100 mi (155 km) northwest of Niihau, Hawaii, dissipating shortly thereafter. (Note: In their post-season report on all tropical cyclones within their area of responsibility in 2001, the Central Pacific Hurricane Center (CPHC) terminates Tropical Depression Barbara at 00:00 UTC on June 23 (2:00 p.m. HST on June 22).)

=== July ===
July 13

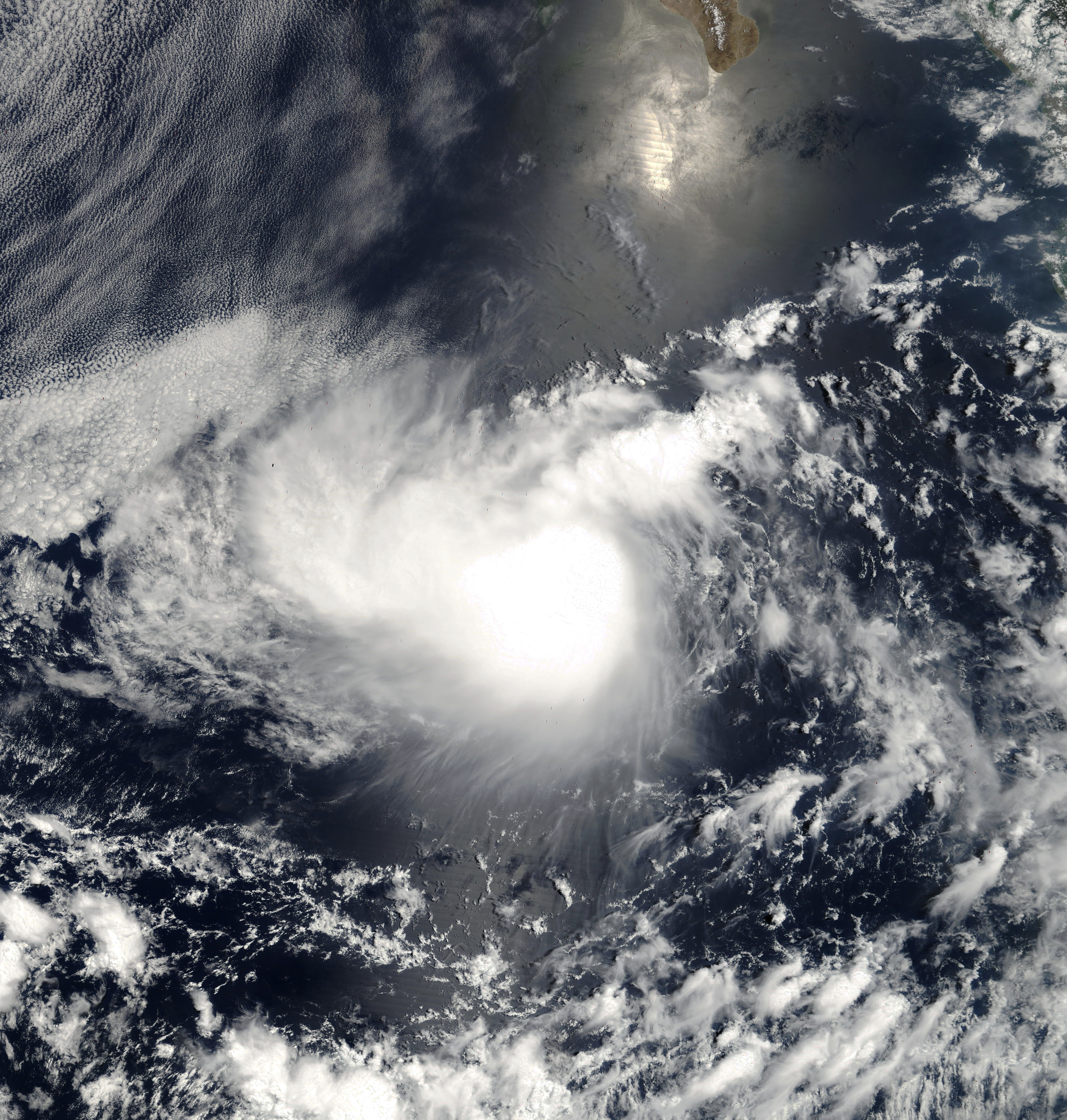
Tropical Storm Cosme on July 13

- 06:00 UTC (11:00 p.m. PDT, July 12) at 15.0°N 108.4°W – Tropical Depression Three-E forms from a tropical wave about 390 mi (630 km) southwest of Manzanillo, Colima.
- 12:00 UTC (5:00 a.m. PDT) at 15.8°N 110.0°W – Tropical Depression Three-E strengthens into Tropical Storm Cosme about 435 mi (705 km) west-southwest of Manzanillo, or about 490 mi (785 km) south of Cabo San Lucas.
- 18:00 UTC (11:00 a.m. PDT) at 16.3°N 111.4°W – Tropical Storm Cosme attains its peak intensity, with maximum sustained winds of 45 mph (75 km/h) and a minimum central pressure of 1000 mbar (29.53 inHg), about 465 mi (750 km) south of Cabo San Lucas.

July 14

- 18:00 UTC (11:00 a.m. PDT) at 18.2°N 115.1°W – Tropical Storm Cosme weakens into a tropical depression about 465 mi (750 km) southwest of Cabo San Lucas.

July 15

- 06:00 UTC (11:00 p.m. PDT, July 14) at 19.2°N 116.6°W – Tropical Depression Cosme is last noted as a tropical cyclone about 495 mi (795 km) west-southwest of Cabo San Lucas, degenerating into a remnant low shortly thereafter.

July 20

- 18:00 UTC (11:00 a.m. PDT) at 13.9°N 117.4°W – Tropical Depression Four-E forms from a tropical wave about 790 mi (1,270 km) southwest of Cabo San Lucas.

July 21

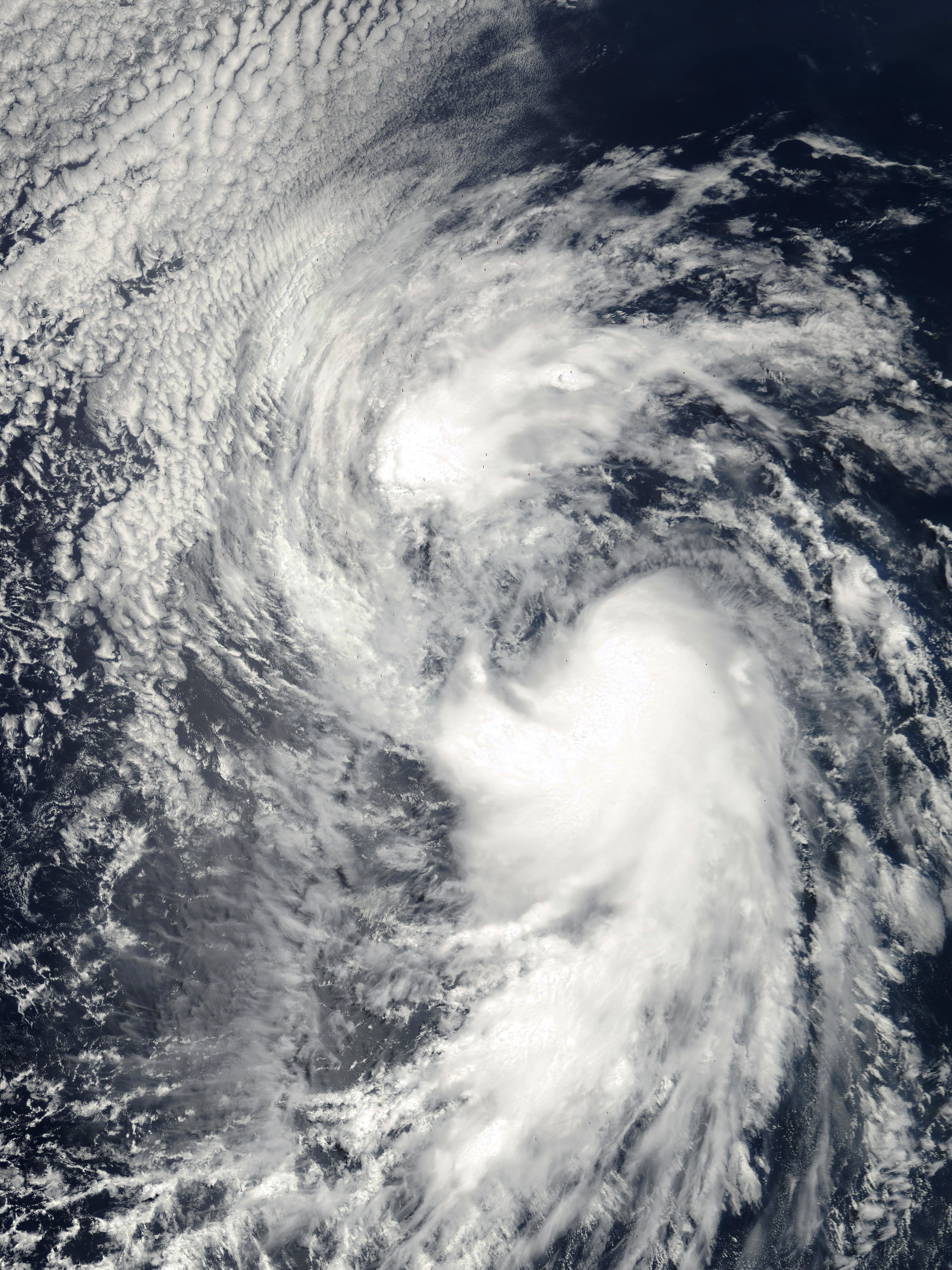
Tropical Storm Erick on July 21

- 00:00 UTC (5:00 p.m. PDT, July 20) at 11.3°N 98.3°W – Tropical Depression Five-E forms from a tropical wave about 350 mi (565 km) south-southeast of Puerto Ángel, Oaxaca.
- 12:00 UTC (5:00 a.m. PDT) at 12.4°N 96.0°W – Tropical Depression Five-E strengthens into Tropical Storm Dalila about 230 mi (370 km) south of Puerto Ángel.
- 18:00 UTC (11:00 a.m. PDT) at 16.2°N 120.4°W – Tropical Depression Four-E strengthens into Tropical Storm Erick about 825 mi (1,325 km) southwest of Cabo San Lucas.

July 22

- 12:00 UTC (5:00 a.m. PDT) at 18.5°N 123.3°W – Tropical Storm Erick attains its peak intensity, with maximum sustained winds of 40 mph (65 km/h) and a minimum central pressure of 1001 mbar (29.56 inHg), about 915 mi (1,470 km) west-southwest of Cabo San Lucas.

July 23

- 12:00 UTC (5:00 a.m. PDT) at 20.4°N 127.4°W – Tropical Storm Erick weakens into a tropical depression about 1,135 mi (1,825 km) west of Cabo San Lucas.

July 24

- 00:00 UTC (5:00 p.m. PDT, July 23) at 21.1°N 128.6°W – Tropical Depression Erick is last noted as a tropical cyclone about 1,195 mi (1,925 km) west of Cabo San Lucas, dissipating shortly thereafter.
- 12:00 UTC (5:00 a.m. PDT) at 18.2°N 109.0°W – Tropical Storm Dalila strengthens into a Category 1 hurricane about 330 mi (530 km) south of Cabo San Lucas. It simultaneously attains its peak intensity, with maximum sustained winds of 75 mph (120 km/h) and a minimum central pressure of 987 mbar (29.15 inHg).
- 18:00 UTC (11:00 a.m. PDT) at 18.4°N 109.8°W – Hurricane Dalila weakens into a tropical storm about 310 mi (500 km) south of Cabo San Lucas.

July 28

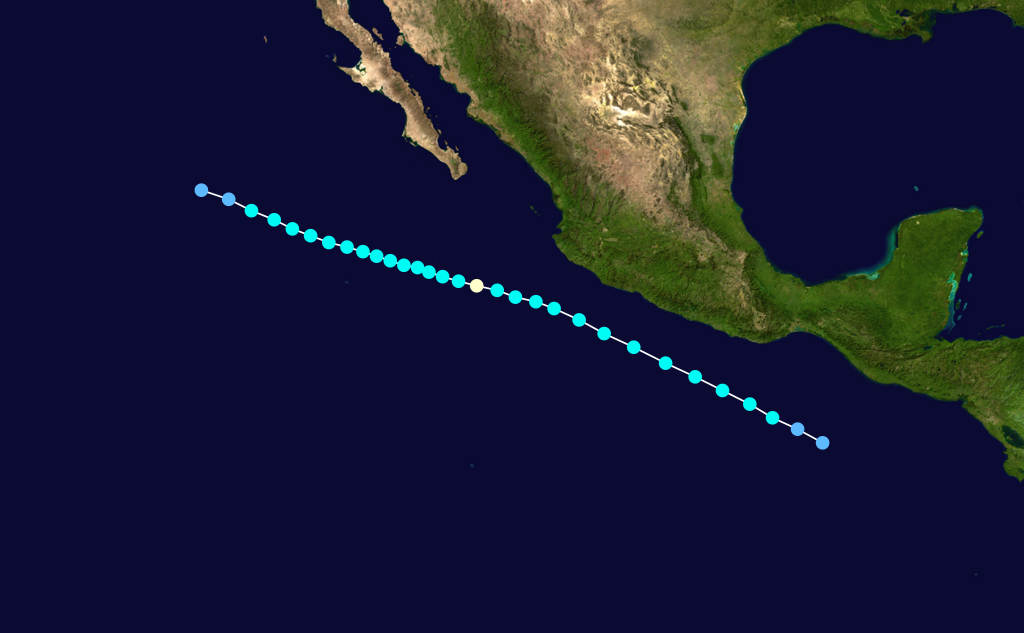
Track map of Hurricane Dalila

- 00:00 UTC (5:00 p.m. PDT, July 27) at 22.0°N 119.9°W – Tropical Storm Dalila weakens into a tropical depression about 640 mi (1,030 km) west of Cabo San Lucas.
- 06:00 UTC (11:00 p.m. PDT, July 27) at 22.4°N 121.1°W – Tropical Depression Dalila is last noted as a tropical cyclone about 710 mi (1,140 km) west of Cabo San Lucas, dissipating shortly thereafter.

=== August ===
August 22

- 12:00 UTC (5:00 a.m. PDT) at 17.1°N 135.4°W – Tropical Depression Six-E forms from a tropical wave about 1,285 mi (2,065 km) east of Cape Kumukahi Light.
- 18:00 UTC (11:00 a.m. PDT) at 18.1°N 135.9°W – Tropical Depression Six-E attains its peak intensity, with maximum sustained winds of 35 mph (55 km/h) and a minimum central pressure of 1007 mbar (29.74 inHg), about 1,235 mi (1,990 km) east of Cape Kumukahi Light.

August 24

- 00:00 UTC (5:00 p.m. PDT, August 23) at 21.1°N 137.8°W – Tropical Depression Six-E is last noted as a tropical cyclone about 1,105 mi (1,780 km) east of Cape Kumukahi Light, dissipating shortly thereafter.

August 26

- 06:00 UTC (11:00 p.m. PDT, August 25) at 19.1°N 108.5°W – Tropical Depression Seven-E forms from a tropical wave about 275 mi (445 km) south-southeast of Cabo San Lucas.
- 18:00 UTC (11:00 a.m. PDT) at 20.0°N 110.6°W – Tropical Depression Seven-E strengthens into Tropical Storm Flossie about 200 mi (325 km) south of Cabo San Lucas.

August 27

- 18:00 UTC (11:00 a.m. PDT) at 19.9°N 113.8°W – Tropical Storm Flossie strengthens into a Category 1 hurricane about 320 mi (520 km) southwest of Cabo San Lucas.

August 29

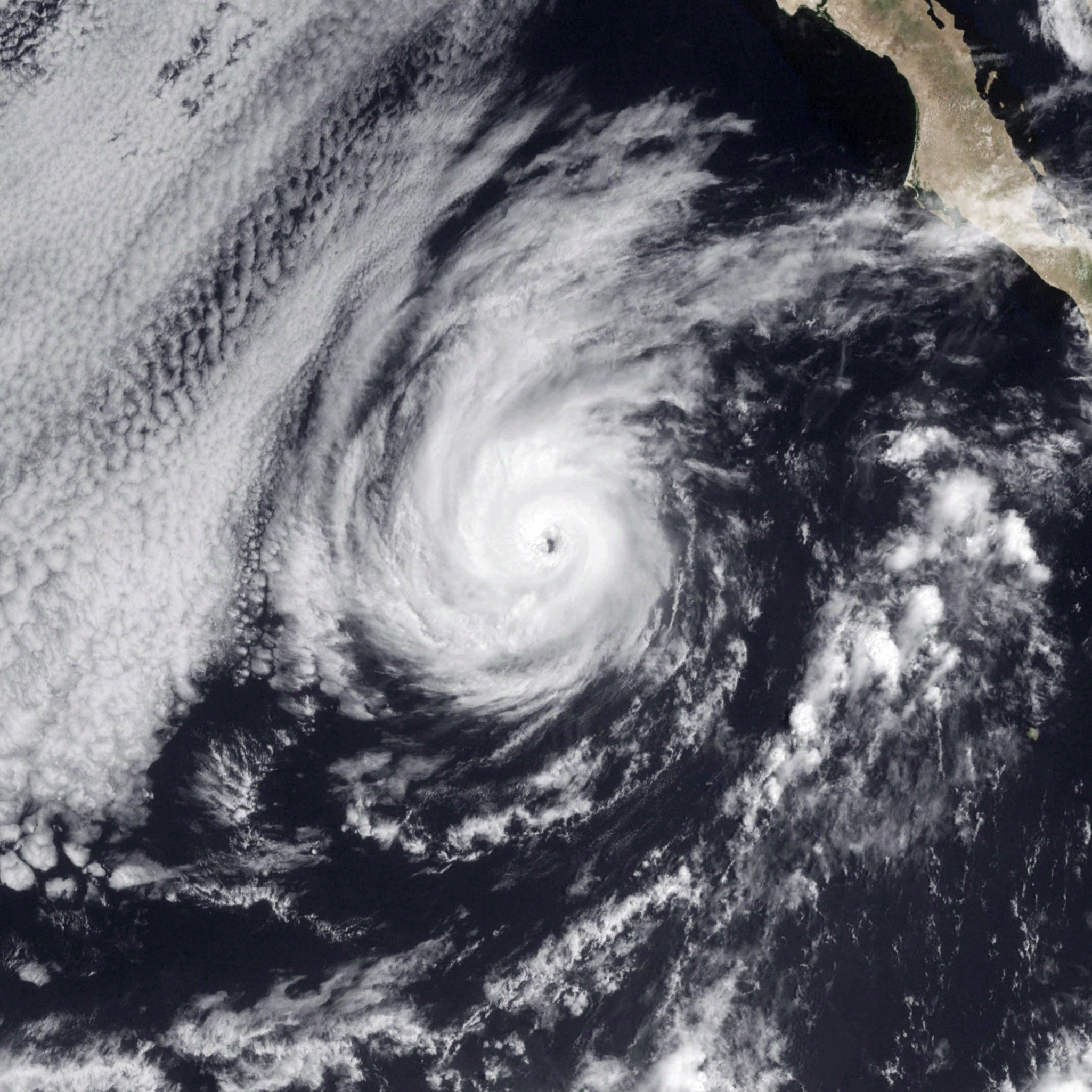
Hurricane Flossie at peak intensity on August 29

- 12:00 UTC (5:00 a.m. PDT) at 20.6°N 116.2°W – Hurricane Flossie strengthens to Category 2 intensity about 430 mi (695 km) west-southwest of Cabo San Lucas.
- 18:00 UTC (11:00 a.m. PDT) at 20.9°N 116.6°W – Hurricane Flossie attains its peak intensity, with maximum sustained winds of 105 mph (165 km/h) and a minimum central pressure of 972 mbar (28.70 inHg), about 450 mi (720 km) west-southwest of Cabo San Lucas.

August 30

- 06:00 UTC (11:00 p.m. PDT, August 29) at 21.9°N 117.7°W – Hurricane Flossie weakens to Category 1 intensity about 500 mi (805 km) west of Cabo San Lucas, or about 445 mi (715 km) south-southwest of Punta Eugenia, Baja California Sur.

August 31

- 06:00 UTC (11:00 p.m. PDT, August 30) at 23.6°N 118.6°W – Hurricane Flossie weakens into a tropical storm about 370 mi (595 km) southwest of Punta Eugenia.

=== September ===
September 1

- 12:00 UTC (5:00 a.m. PDT) at 25.6°N 118.9°W – Tropical Storm Flossie weakens into a tropical depression about 280 mi (455 km) southwest of Punta Eugenia.

September 2

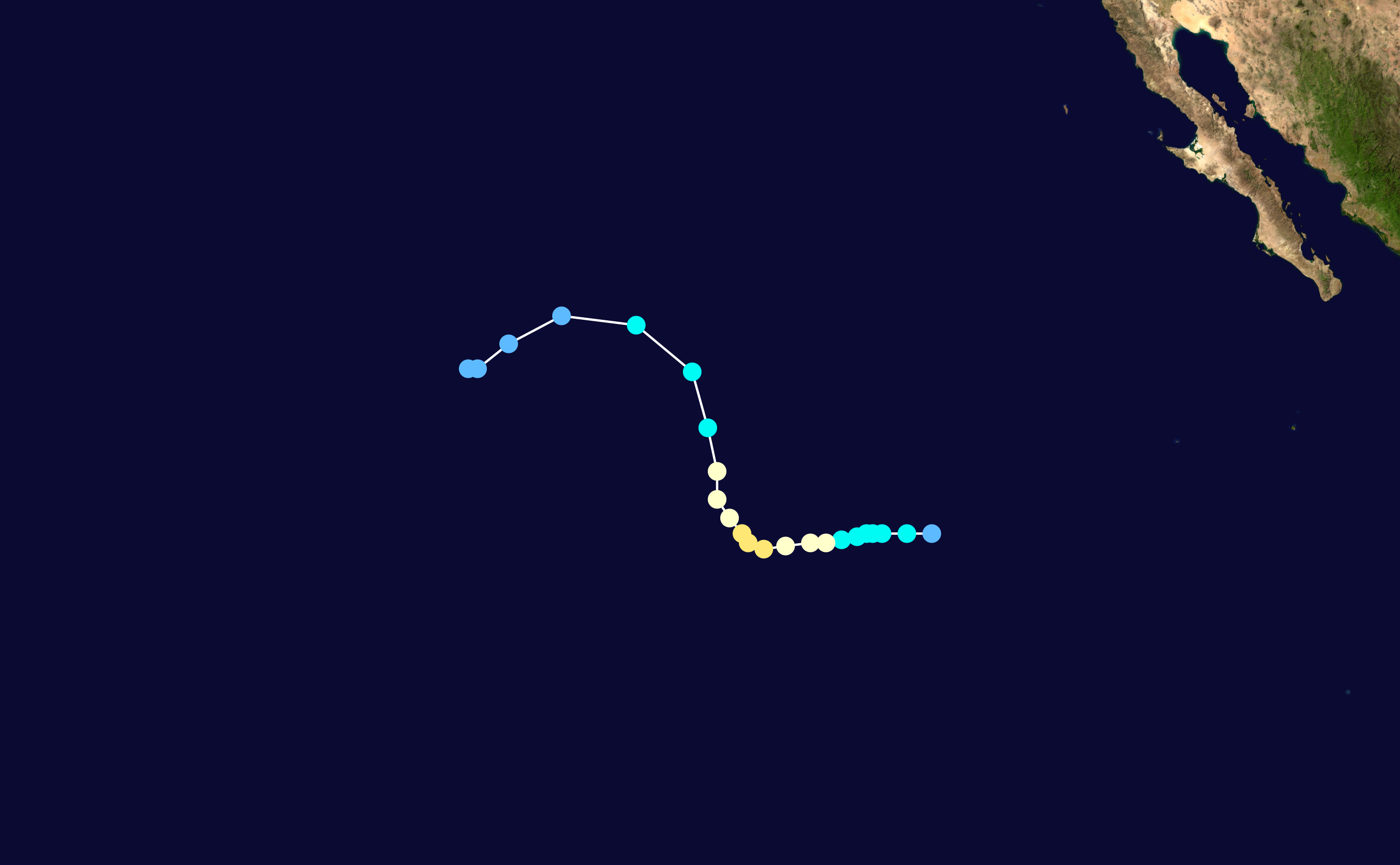

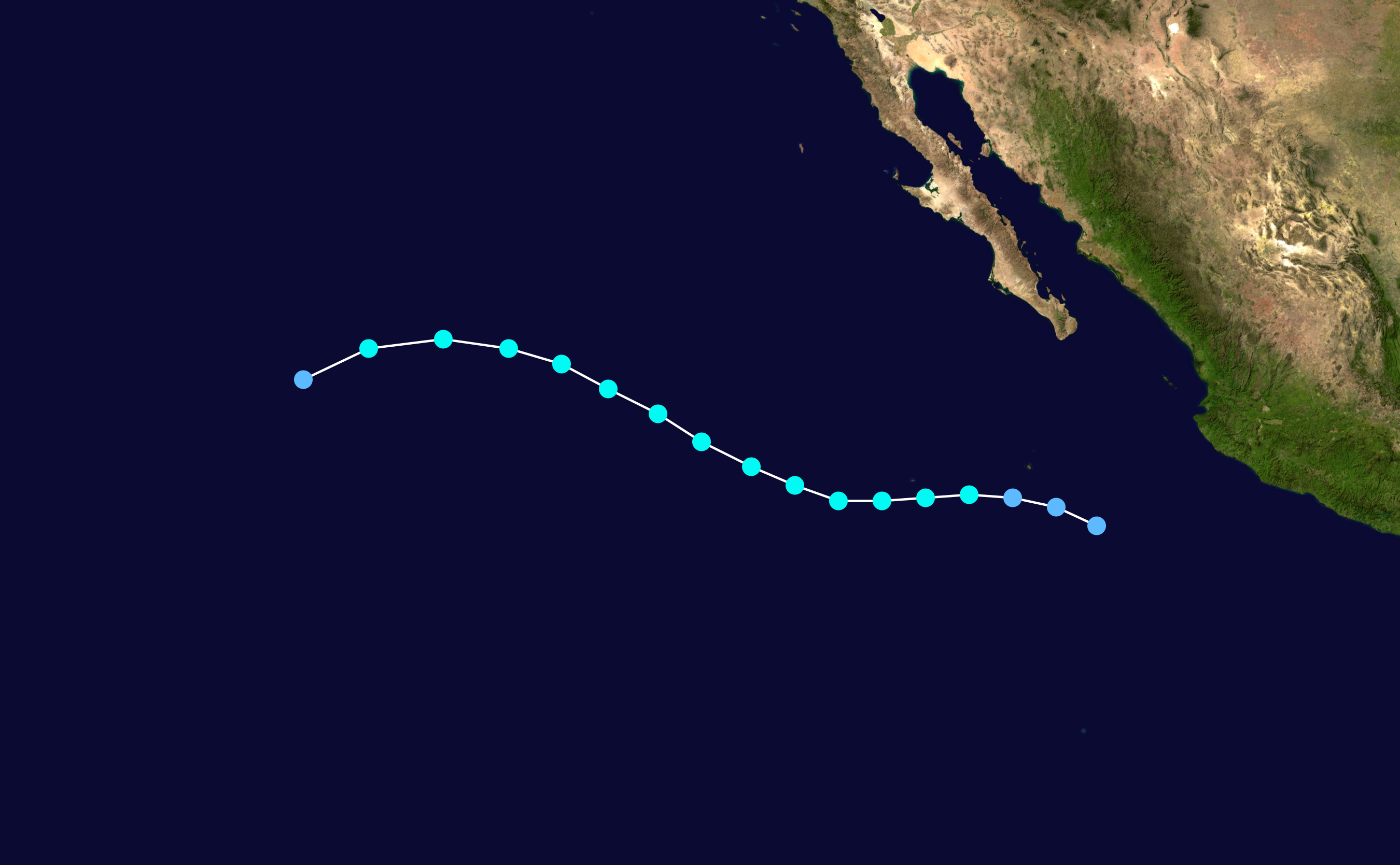
Track maps of Hurricane Gil (top) and Tropical Storm Henriette (bottom), which interacted with each other in early September

- 00:00 UTC (5:00 p.m. PDT, September 1) at 26.6°N 118.4°W – Tropical Depression Flossie is last noted as a tropical cyclone about 220 mi (350 km) west-southwest of Punta Eugenia, dissipating shortly thereafter.

September 4

- 06:00 UTC (11:00 p.m. PDT, September 3) at 15.4°N 122.6°W – Tropical Depression Eight-E forms from a tropical wave about 970 mi (1,565 km) southwest of Cabo San Lucas.
- 12:00 UTC (5:00 a.m. PDT) at 15.4°N 123.4°W – Tropical Depression Eight-E strengthens into Tropical Storm Gil about 1,020 mi (1,640 km) west-southwest of Cabo San Lucas.
- 12:00 UTC (5:00 a.m. PDT) at 16.9°N 108.8°W – Tropical Depression Nine-E forms from a monsoon-like tropical wave about 330 mi (530 km) west-southwest of Manzanillo.

September 5

- 06:00 UTC (11:00 p.m. PDT, September 4) at 17.9°N 112.9°W – Tropical Depression Nine-E strengthens into Tropical Storm Henriette about 390 mi (630 km) south-southwest of Cabo San Lucas.

September 6

- 00:00 UTC (5:00 p.m. PDT, September 5) at 15.1°N 126.0°W – Tropical Storm Gil strengthens into a Category 1 hurricane about 1,175 mi (1,890 km) west-southwest of Cabo San Lucas.
- 18:00 UTC (11:00 a.m. PDT) at 14.9°N 128.0°W – Hurricane Gil strengthens to Category 2 intensity about 1,300 mi (2,095 km) west-southwest of Cabo San Lucas. It simultaneously attains its peak intensity, with maximum sustained winds of 100 mph (155 km/h) and a minimum central pressure of 975 mbar (28.79 inHg).

September 7

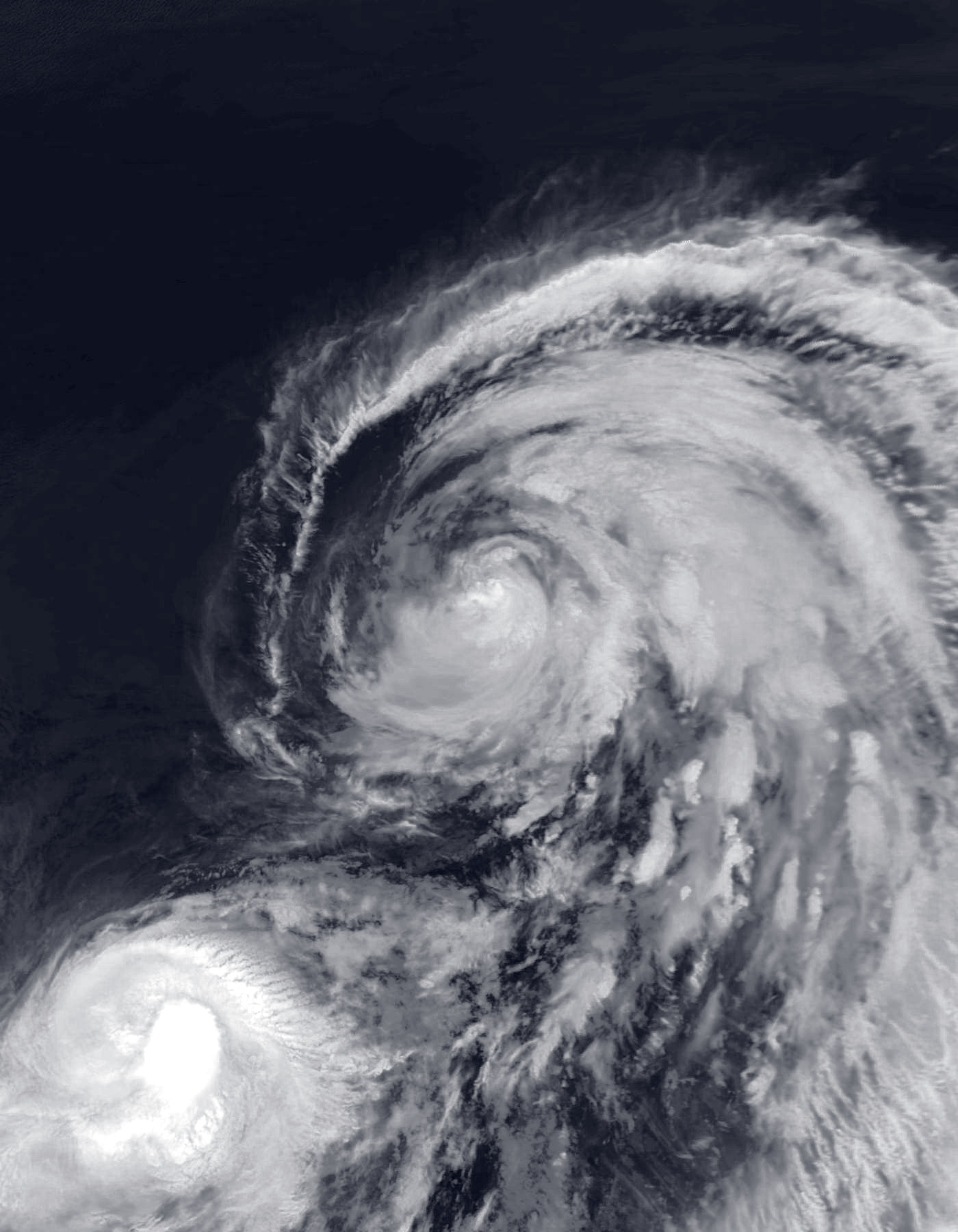
Hurricane Gil (bottom left) and Tropical Storm Henriette (center) on September 7

- 00:00 UTC (5:00 p.m. PDT, September 6) at 20.5°N 122.9°W – Tropical Storm Henriette attains its peak intensity, with maximum sustained winds of 65 mph (100 km/h) and a minimum central pressure of 994 mbar (29.35 inHg), about 845 mi (1,360 km) west of Cabo San Lucas.
- 12:00 UTC (5:00 a.m. PDT) at 15.9°N 129.1°W – Hurricane Gil weakens to Category 1 intensity about 1,335 mi (2,150 km) west-southwest of Cabo San Lucas.

September 8

- 06:00 UTC (11:00 p.m. PDT, September 7) at 18.8°N 129.8°W – Hurricane Gil weakens into a tropical storm about 1,310 mi (2,110 km) west-southwest of Cabo San Lucas.
- 12:00 UTC (5:00 a.m. PDT) at 21.6°N 134.3°W – Tropical Storm Henriette weakens into a tropical depression about 1,555 mi (2,500 km) west of Cabo San Lucas, dissipating shortly thereafter when it is absorbed by Tropical Storm Gil.

September 9

- 00:00 UTC (5:00 p.m. PDT, September 8) at 22.4°N 134.5°W – Tropical Storm Gil weakens into a tropical depression about 1,565 mi (2,520 km) west of Cabo San Lucas.
- 18:00 UTC (11:00 a.m. PDT) at 20.7°N 137.5°W – Tropical Depression Gil is last noted as a tropical cyclone about 1,770 mi (2,850 km) west of Cabo San Lucas, dissipating shortly thereafter.

September 10

- 00:00 UTC (2:00 p.m. HST, September 9) at 12.7°N 146.7°W – Tropical Depression One-C forms about 715 mi (1,150 km) southeast of Cape Kumukahi Light. (Note: The CPHC's best track for Tropical Depression One-C, as seen in the year-end tropical cyclone report, does not initiate the system until 03:00 UTC on September 11 (5:00 p.m. HST on September 10). The report also does not provide information on any precursor disturbance which may have led to the depression's formation.)
- 12:00 UTC (2:00 a.m. HST) at 13.2°N 149.0°W – Tropical Depression One-C attains peak maximum sustained winds of 35 mph (55 km/h) about 580 mi (935 km) southeast of Cape Kumukahi Light.
- 12:00 UTC (5:00 a.m. PDT) at 14.8°N 98.9°W – Tropical Depression Ten-E forms from a tropical wave about 155 mi (250 km) south-southeast of Acapulco.
- 18:00 UTC (8:00 a.m. HST) at 13.7°N 150.3°W – Tropical Depression One-C attains a minimum central pressure of 1005 mbar (29.68 inHg) about 500 mi (805 km) southeast of Cape Kumukahi Light.

September 11

- 06:00 UTC (11:00 p.m. PDT, September 10) at 15.7°N 102.7°W – Tropical Depression Ten-E strengthens into Tropical Storm Ivo about 200 mi (325 km) west-southwest of Acapulco.
- 12:00 UTC (2:00 a.m. HST) at 12.6°N 154.8°W – Tropical Depression One-C is last noted as a tropical cyclone about 435 mi (705 km) south of Ka Lae, dissipating shortly thereafter.

September 12

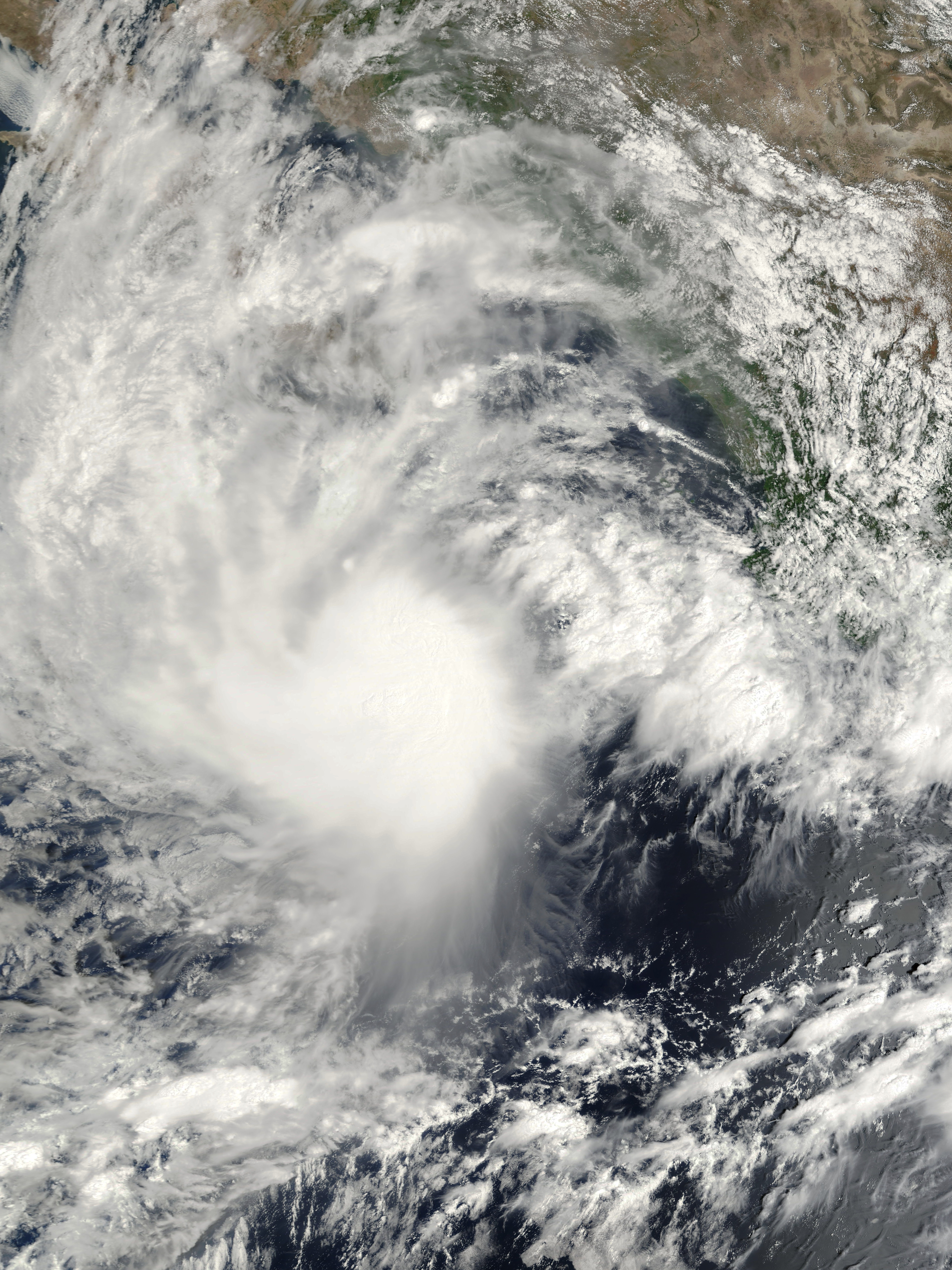
Tropical Storm Ivo near peak intensity on September 12

- 18:00 UTC (11:00 a.m. PDT) at 20.3°N 109.6°W – Tropical Storm Ivo attains its peak intensity, with maximum sustained winds of 50 mph (85 km/h) and a minimum central pressure of 997 mbar (29.44 inHg), about 180 mi (285 km) south of Cabo San Lucas.

September 14

- 06:00 UTC (11:00 p.m. PDT, September 13) at 25.0°N 115.2°W – Tropical Storm Ivo weakens into a tropical depression about 195 mi (315 km) south of Punta Eugenia.

September 15

- 00:00 UTC (5:00 p.m. PDT, September 14) at 25.1°N 117.5°W – Tropical Depression Ivo is last noted as a tropical cyclone about 240 mi (390 km) southwest of Punta Eugenia, dissipating shortly thereafter.

September 21

- 06:00 UTC (11:00 p.m. PDT, September 20) at 12.6°N 91.1°W – The twelfth tropical depression of the season (Note: Eleventh in the Eastern Pacific proper (east of 140°W)) forms from the remnants of Atlantic Tropical Depression Nine about 105 mi (165 km) off the coast of Guatemala, or about 370 mi (595 km) southeast of Salina Cruz, Oaxaca.
- 12:00 UTC (5:00 a.m. PDT) at 13.0°N 92.8°W – The twelfth tropical depression of the season strengthens into Tropical Storm Juliette about 270 mi (435 km) southeast of Salina Cruz.
- 18:00 UTC (11:00 a.m. PDT) at 15.6°N 116.1°W – Tropical Depression Twelve-E forms from a tropical wave about 645 mi (1,035 km) southwest of Cabo San Lucas.

September 22

- 12:00 UTC (5:00 a.m. PDT) at 17.0°N 119.2°W – Tropical Depression Twelve-E strengthens into Tropical Storm Kiko about 725 mi (1,165 km) southwest of Cabo San Lucas.
- 12:00 UTC (2:00 a.m. HST) at 9.7°N 143.5°W – Tropical Depression Two-C forms about 1,015 mi (1,630 km) southeast of Cape Kumukahi Light. (Note: The CPHC's best track for Tropical Depression Two-C, as seen in the year-end tropical cyclone report, does not initiate the system until 09:00 UTC on September 23 (11:00 p.m. HST on September 22). The report also does not provide information on any precursor disturbance which may have led to the depression's formation.)

September 23

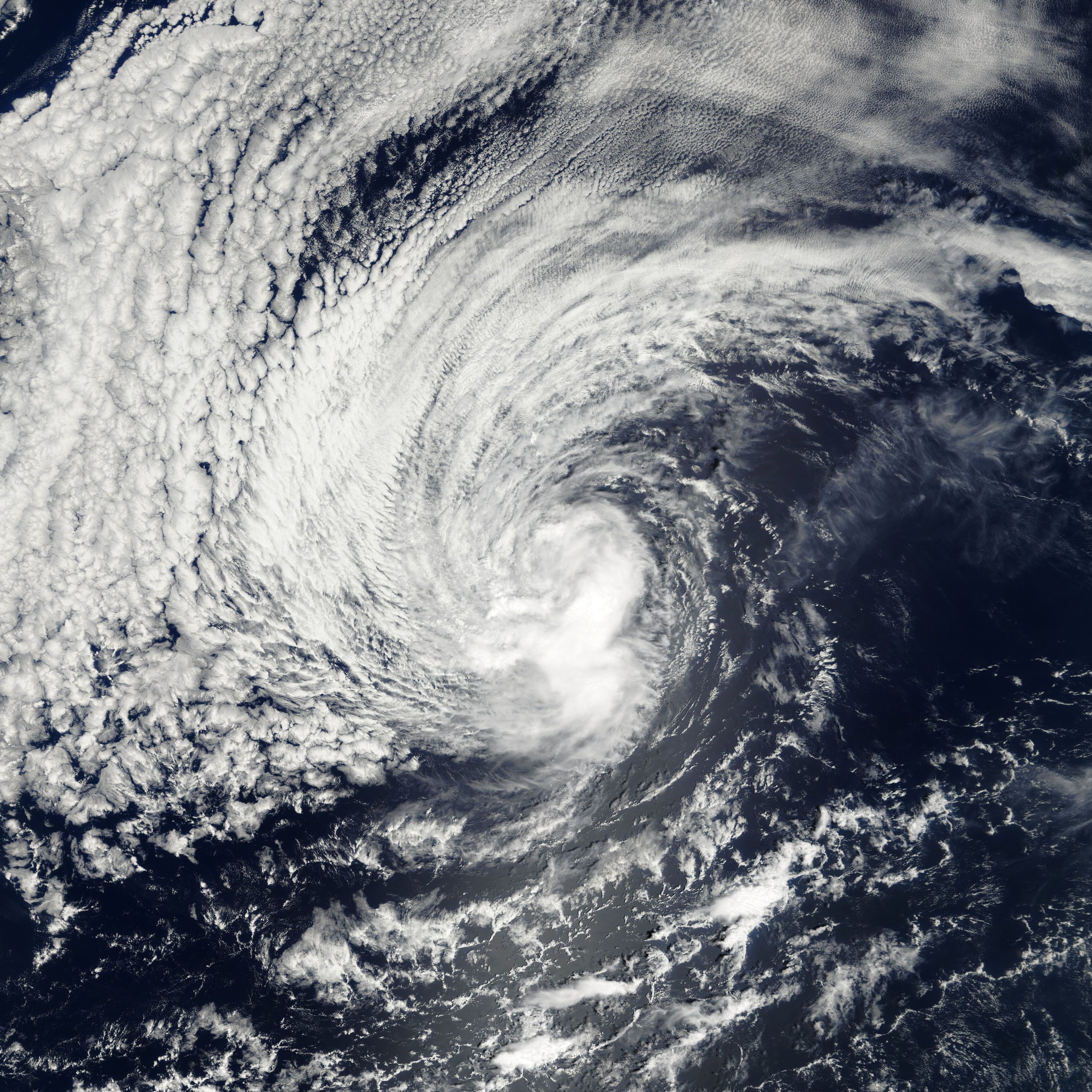
Tropical Storm Kiko late on September 23, shortly after its brief stint as a hurricane

- 00:00 UTC (2:00 p.m. HST, September 22) at 9.9°N 147.2°W – Tropical Depression Two-C attains its peak intensity, with maximum sustained winds of 35 mph (55 km/h) and a minimum central pressure of 1008 mbar (29.77 inHg), about 835 mi (1,345 km) southeast of Cape Kumukahi Light. (Note: In HURDAT, Tropical Depression Two-C is listed as having briefly become a tropical storm at 06:00 UTC on September 23 (8:00 p.m. HST on September 22), with maximum sustained winds of 40 mph (65 km/h).)
- 12:00 UTC (5:00 a.m. PDT) at 14.8°N 102.2°W – Tropical Storm Juliette strengthens into a Category 1 hurricane about 220 mi (350 km) south of Lázaro Cárdenas, Michoacán.
- 12:00 UTC (5:00 a.m. PDT) at 18.2°N 123.3°W – Tropical Storm Kiko strengthens into a Category 1 hurricane about 920 mi (1,480 km) west-southwest of Cabo San Lucas. It simultaneously attains its peak intensity, with maximum sustained winds of 75 mph (120 km/h) and a minimum central pressure of 990 mbar (29.23 inHg).
- 18:00 UTC (11:00 a.m. PDT) at 14.9°N 102.8°W – Hurricane Juliette strengthens to Category 2 intensity about 215 mi (345 km) south of Lázaro Cárdenas.
- 18:00 UTC (11:00 a.m. PDT) at 18.3°N 124.4°W – Hurricane Kiko weakens into a tropical storm about 985 mi (1,585 km) west-southwest of Cabo San Lucas.

September 24

- 00:00 UTC (5:00 p.m. PDT, September 23) at 14.8°N 103.3°W – Hurricane Juliette strengthens to Category 3 intensity about 230 mi (370 km) south-southwest of Lázaro Cárdenas.
- 06:00 UTC (11:00 p.m. PDT, September 23) at 15.0°N 103.5°W – Hurricane Juliette strengthens to Category 4 intensity about 225 mi (360 km) south-southwest of Lázaro Cárdenas.
- 12:00 UTC (5:00 a.m. PDT) at 15.1°N 103.8°W – Hurricane Juliette weakens to Category 3 intensity about 225 mi (360 km) south-southwest of Lázaro Cárdenas.
- 18:00 UTC (11:00 a.m. PDT) at 15.2°N 104.1°W – Hurricane Juliette weakens to Category 2 intensity about 230 mi (370 km) southwest of Lázaro Cárdenas.

September 25

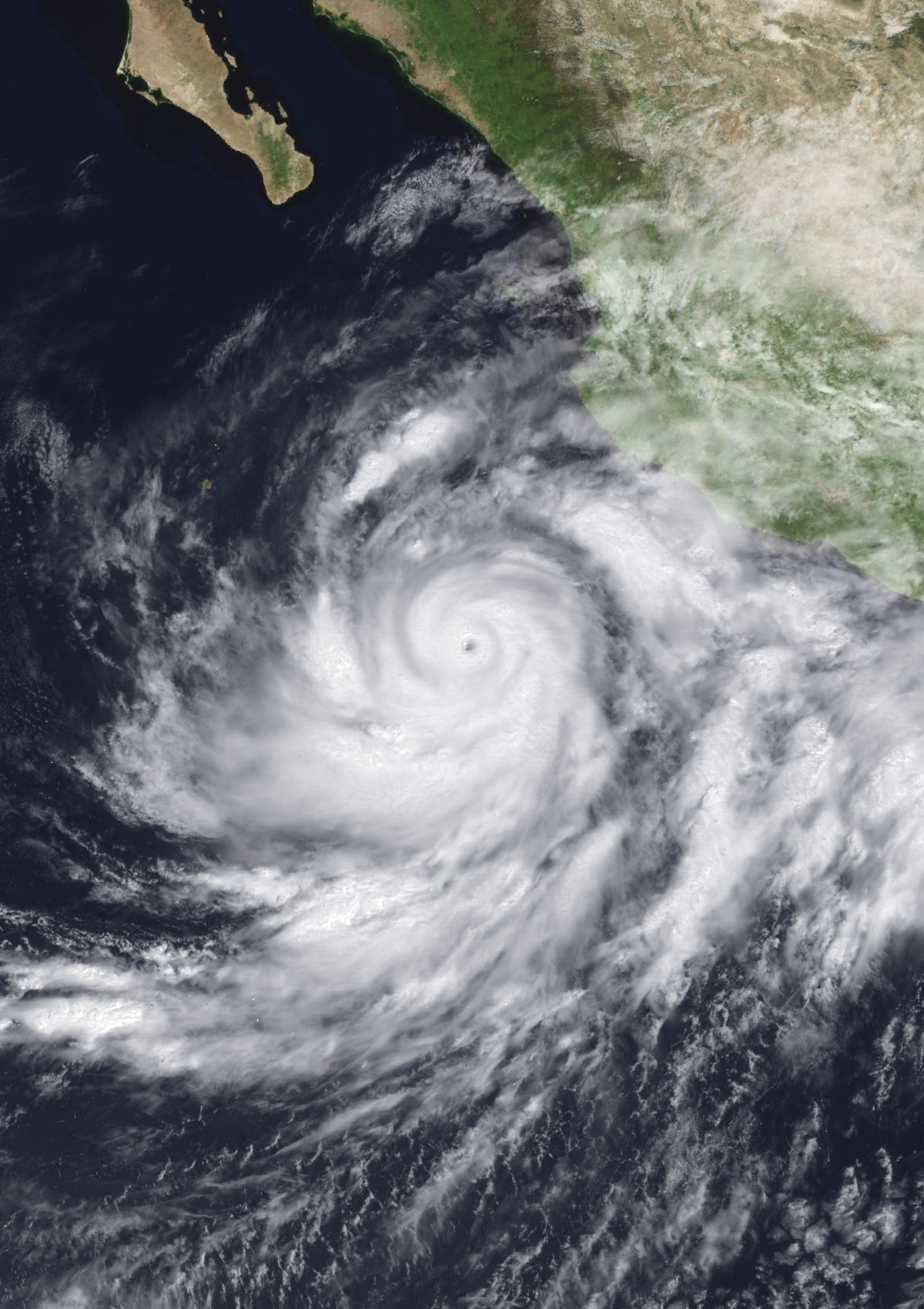
Hurricane Juliette at peak intensity on September 25

- 00:00 UTC (5:00 p.m. PDT, September 24) at 15.4°N 104.7°W – Hurricane Juliette rapidly restrengthens to Category 4 intensity about 240 mi (390 km) southwest of Lázaro Cárdenas, or 255 mi (405 km) south of Manzanillo.
- 06:00 UTC (8:00 p.m. HST, September 24) at 11.1°N 161.2°W – Tropical Depression Two-C is last noted as a tropical cyclone about 650 mi (1,045 km) southwest of Ka Lae, dissipating shortly thereafter.
- 12:00 UTC (5:00 a.m. PDT) at 19.2°N 128.6°W – Tropical Storm Kiko weakens into a tropical depression about 1,225 mi (1,970 km) west of Cabo San Lucas.
- 18:00 UTC (11:00 a.m. PDT) at 16.4°N 107.2°W – Hurricane Juliette attains its peak intensity, with maximum sustained winds of 145 mph (230 km/h) and a minimum central pressure of 923 mbar (27.26 inHg), about 265 mi (425 km) southwest of Manzanillo, making it the strongest storm of the season.
- 18:00 UTC (11:00 a.m. PDT) at 19.2°N 129.3°W – Tropical Depression Kiko is last noted as a tropical cyclone about 1,270 mi (2,045 km) west of Cabo San Lucas, dissipating shortly thereafter.

September 26

- 12:00 UTC (5:00 a.m. PDT) at 18.2°N 109.1°W – Hurricane Juliette weakens to Category 3 intensity about 315 mi (510 km) west of Manzanillo, or about 270 mi (435 km) southwest of Cabo Corrientes, Jalisco.

September 27

- 00:00 UTC (5:00 p.m. PDT, September 26) at 19.4°N 110.3°W – Hurricane Juliette weakens back to Category 2 intensity about 305 mi (490 km) west-southwest of Cabo Corrientes, or about 240 mi (390 km) south of Cabo San Lucas.
- 18:00 UTC (11:00 a.m. PDT) at 21.4°N 110.7°W – Hurricane Juliette weakens to Category 1 intensity about 115 mi (185 km) south-southwest of Cabo San Lucas.

September 28

- 18:00 UTC (11:00 a.m. PDT) at 23.2°N 111.1°W – Hurricane Juliette weakens into a tropical storm about 75 mi (120 km) west-northwest of Cabo San Lucas.

September 29

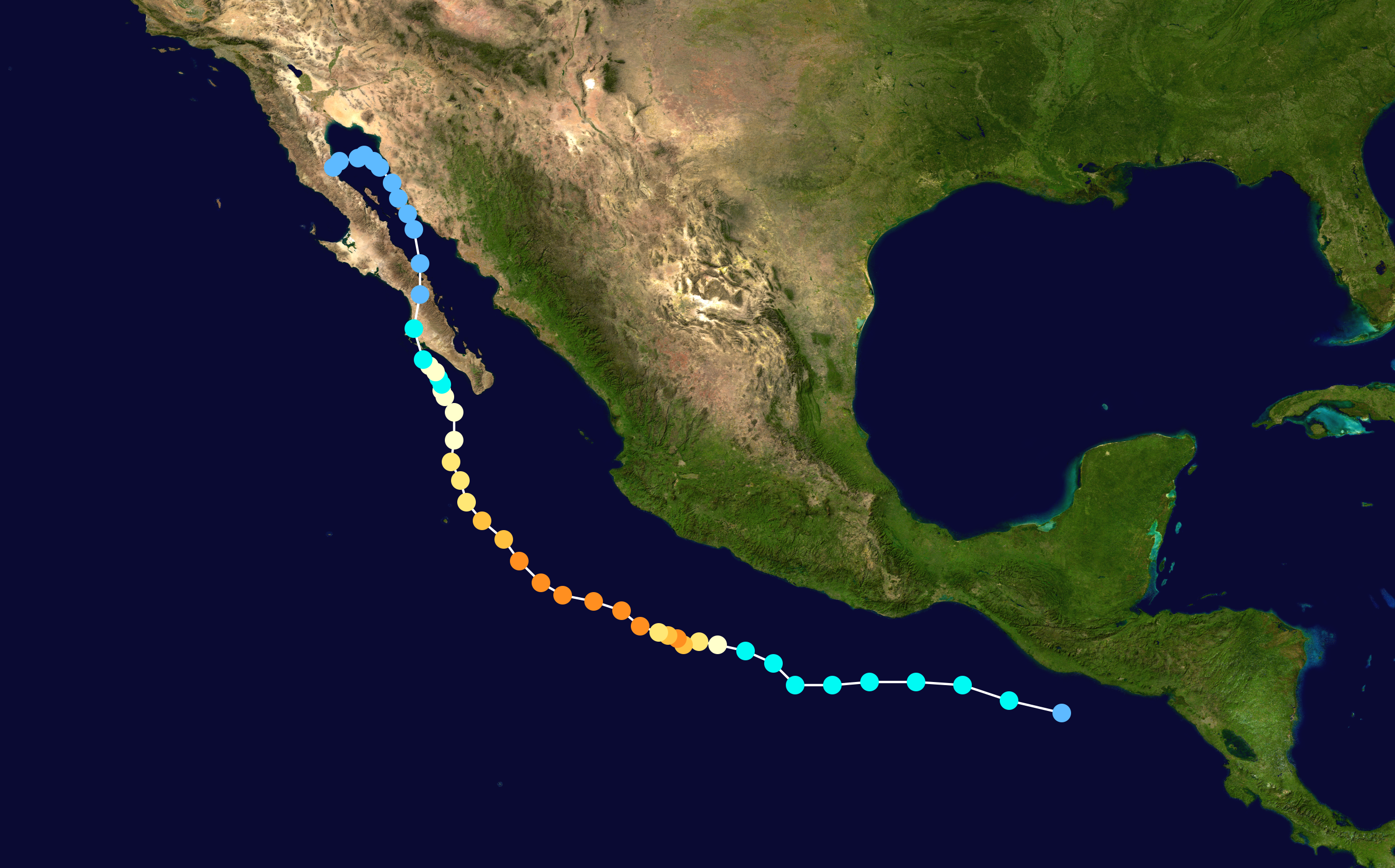
Storm path of Hurricane Juliette

- 06:00 UTC (11:00 p.m. PDT, September 28) at 23.6°N 111.3°W – Tropical Storm Juliette restrengthens into a Category 1 hurricane about 100 mi (155 km) west-northwest of Cabo San Lucas, or about 100 mi (155 km) south-southeast of San Carlos, Baja California Sur.
- 18:00 UTC (11:00 a.m. PDT) at 24.0°N 111.7°W – Hurricane Juliette weakens back into a tropical storm about 60 mi (95 km) south-southeast of San Carlos.

September 30

- 00:00 UTC (5:00 p.m. PDT, September 29) at 25.0°N 112.0°W – Tropical Storm Juliette makes landfall near San Carlos with maximum sustained winds of 40 mph (65 km/h) and a central pressure of 1000 mbar (29.53 inHg).
- 06:00 UTC (11:00 p.m. PDT, September 29) at 26.1°N 111.8°W – Tropical Storm Juliette weakens into a tropical depression over land about 90 mi (150 km) north of San Carlos, and later emerges over the Gulf of California.

=== October ===
October 2

- 00:00 UTC (5:00 p.m. PDT, October 1) at 11.9°N 102.0°W – Tropical Depression Thirteen-E forms from a tropical wave about 370 mi (595 km) south-southwest of Acapulco.
- 12:00 UTC (5:00 a.m. PDT) at 12.6°N 104.3°W – Tropical Depression Thirteen-E strengthens into Tropical Storm Lorena about 415 mi (665 km) southwest of Acapulco.

October 3

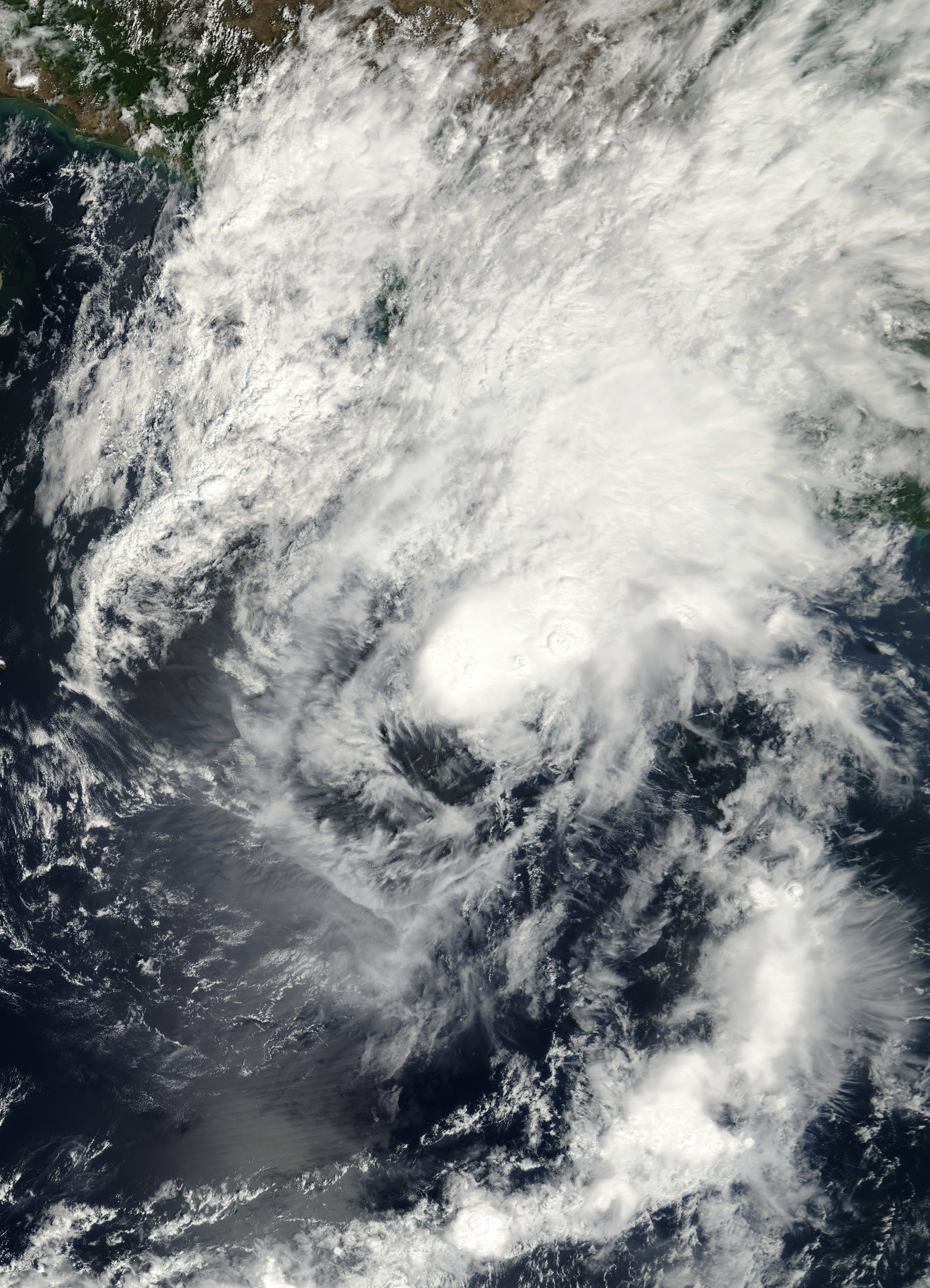
Tropical Storm Lorena just after peak intensity on October 3

- 00:00 UTC (5:00 p.m. PDT, October 2) at 30.2°N 114.6°W – Tropical Depression Juliette is last noted as a tropical cyclone over the extreme northern Gulf of California about 240 mi (390 km) northwest of Santa Rosalía, Baja California Sur, dissipating shortly thereafter.
- 00:00 UTC (5:00 p.m. PDT, October 2) at 13.7°N 120.3°W – Tropical Depression Fourteen-E forms from an Intertropical Convergence Zone (ITCZ) disturbance about 925 mi (1,490 km) southwest of Cabo San Lucas.
- 06:00 UTC (11:00 p.m. PDT, October 2) at 13.8°N 121.2°W – Tropical Depression Fourteen-E attains its peak intensity, with maximum sustained winds of 35 mph (55 km/h) and a minimum central pressure of 1008 mbar (29.77 inHg), about 965 mi (1,555 km) southwest of Cabo San Lucas.
- 12:00 UTC (5:00 a.m. PDT) at 15.7°N 106.5°W – Tropical Storm Lorena attains its peak intensity, with maximum sustained winds of 60 mph (95 km/h) and a minimum central pressure of 997 mbar (29.44 inHg), about 270 mi (435 km) south-southwest of Manzanillo.

October 4

- 00:00 UTC (5:00 p.m. PDT, October 3) at 14.7°N 123.0°W – Tropical Depression Fourteen-E is last noted as a tropical cyclone about 1,025 mi (1,650 km) southwest of Cabo San Lucas, dissipating shortly thereafter.
- 12:00 UTC (5:00 a.m. PDT) at 18.5°N 107.0°W – Tropical Storm Lorena weakens into a tropical depression about 155 mi (250 km) southwest of Cabo Corrientes.
- 18:00 UTC (11:00 a.m. PDT) at 19.6°N 106.7°W – Tropical Depression Lorena is last noted as a tropical cyclone about 85 mi (140 km) southwest of Cabo Corrientes, dissipating shortly thereafter.

October 10

- 12:00 UTC (5:00 a.m. PDT) at 14.1°N 99.2°W – Tropical Depression Fifteen-E forms from the remnants of Atlantic Hurricane Iris about 195 mi (315 km) south-southeast of Acapulco.

October 11

- 06:00 UTC (11:00 p.m. PDT, October 10) at 14.7°N 103.3°W – Tropical Depression Fifteen-E strengthens into Tropical Storm Manuel about 230 mi (370 km) south-southwest of Zihuatanejo, Guerrero.

October 12

- 12:00 UTC (5:00 a.m. PDT) at 15.4°N 109.5°W – Tropical Storm Manuel weakens into a tropical depression about 520 mi (835 km) south of Cabo San Lucas.

October 15

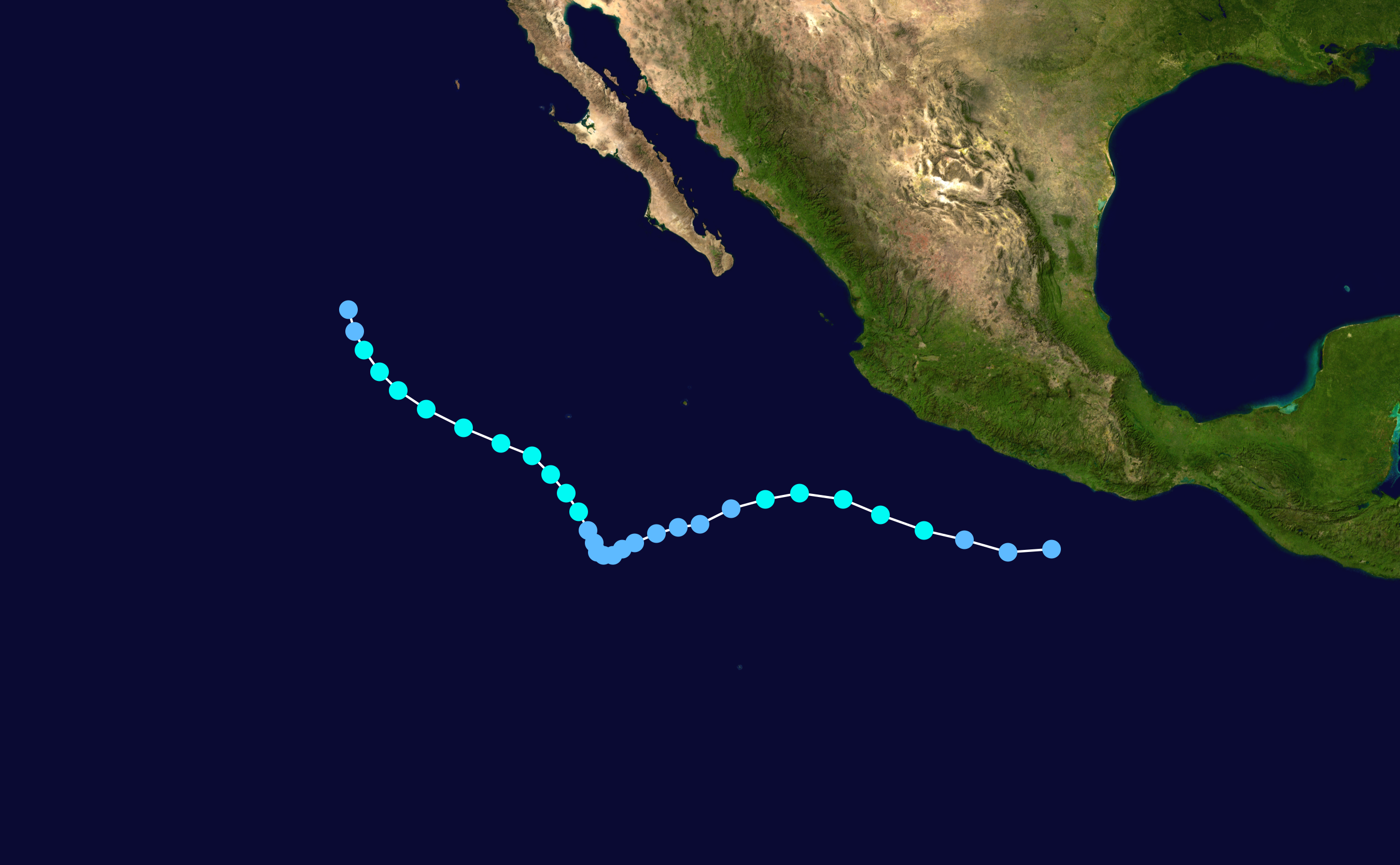
Storm path of Tropical Storm Manuel

- 06:00 UTC (11:00 p.m. PDT, October 14) at 15.3°N 114.4°W – Tropical Depression Manuel restrengthens into a tropical storm about 600 mi (965 km) south-southwest of Cabo San Lucas.

October 16

- 12:00 UTC (5:00 a.m. PDT) at 18.0°N 118.1°W – Tropical Storm Manuel attains its peak intensity, with maximum sustained winds of 60 mph (95 km/h) and a minimum central pressure of 997 mbar (29.44 inHg), about 625 mi (1,010 km) southwest of Cabo San Lucas.

October 17

- 18:00 UTC (11:00 a.m. PDT) at 21.1°N 121.6°W – Tropical Storm Manuel weakens back into a tropical depression about 755 mi (1,215 km) west of Cabo San Lucas.

October 18

- 00:00 UTC (5:00 p.m. PDT, October 17) at 21.8°N 121.8°W – Tropical Depression Manuel is last noted as a tropical cyclone about 760 mi (1,220 km) west of Cabo San Lucas, degenerating into a remnant low shortly thereafter.

October 20

- 12:00 UTC (5:00 a.m. PDT) at 11.0°N 125.0°W – Tropical Depression Sixteen-E forms from a tropical wave about 1,290 mi (2,075 km) southwest of Cabo San Lucas.
- 18:00 UTC (11:00 a.m. PDT) at 11.6°N 126.4°W – Tropical Depression Sixteen-E strengthens into Tropical Storm Narda about 1,335 mi (2,150 km) southwest of Cabo San Lucas.

October 21

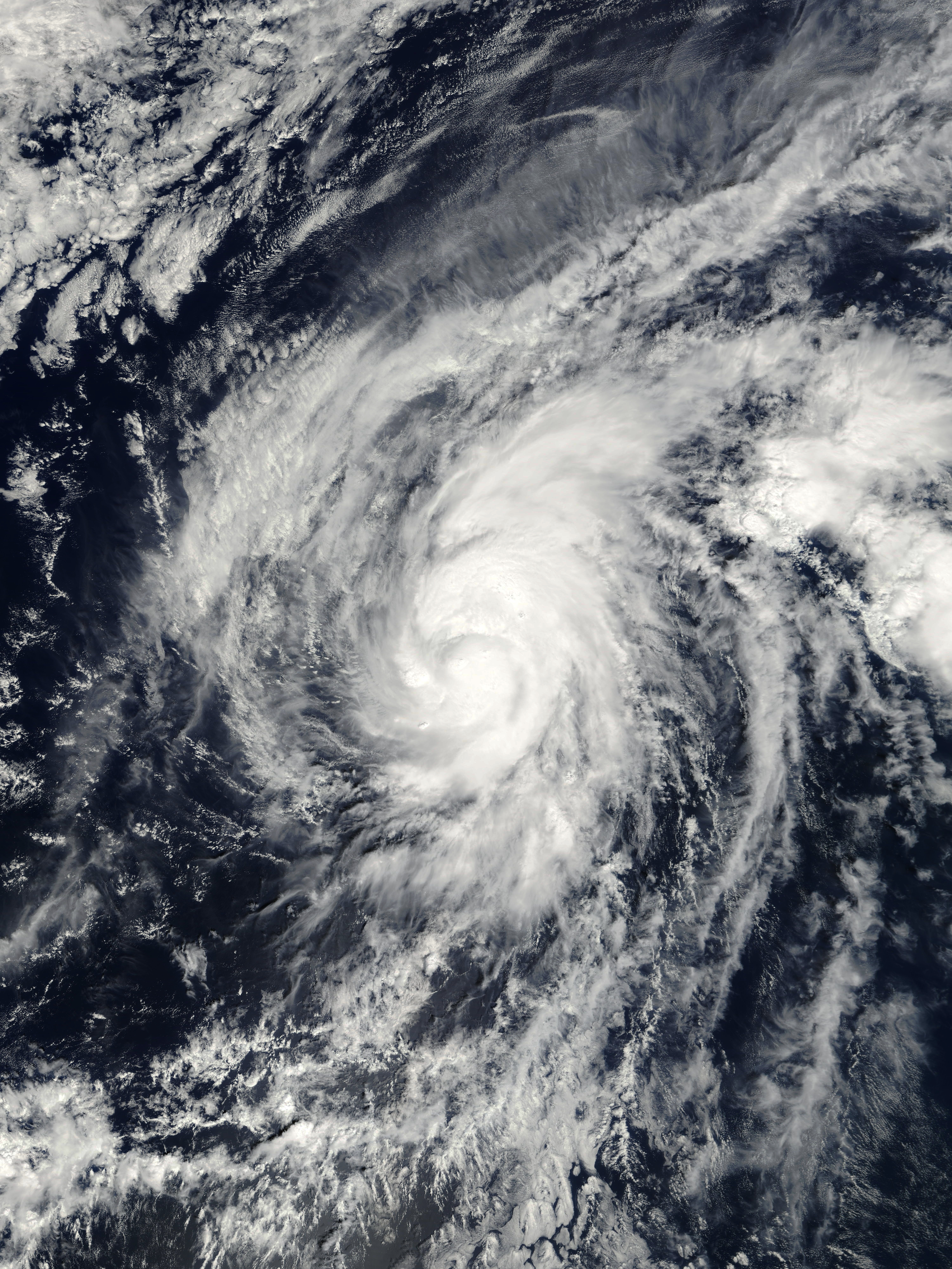
Hurricane Narda strengthening late on October 21

- 18:00 UTC (11:00 a.m. PDT) at 13.9°N 130.6°W – Tropical Storm Narda strengthens into a Category 1 hurricane about 1,485 mi (2,390 km) west-southwest of Cabo San Lucas.

October 22

- 00:00 UTC (5:00 p.m. PDT, October 21) at 14.5°N 131.4°W – Hurricane Narda attains its peak intensity, with maximum sustained winds of 85 mph (140 km/h) and a minimum central pressure of 980 mbar (28.94 inHg), about 1,515 mi (2,435 km) west-southwest of Cabo San Lucas.

October 23

- 00:00 UTC (5:00 p.m. PDT, October 22) at 16.1°N 135.2°W – Hurricane Narda weakens into a tropical storm about 1,705 mi (2,740 km) west-southwest of Cabo San Lucas.

October 24

- 00:00 UTC (2:00 p.m. HST, October 23) at 16.4°N 141.2°W – Tropical Storm Narda weakens into a tropical depression about 920 mi (1,480 km) east-southeast of Cape Kumukahi Light, as it crosses 140°W into the Central Pacific basin.

October 25

- 06:00 UTC (8:00 p.m. HST, October 24) at 16.9°N 146.5°W – Tropical Depression Narda is last noted as a tropical cyclone about 575 mi (925 km) east-southeast of Cape Kumukahi Light, dissipating shortly thereafter.

October 31

- 00:00 UTC (4:00 p.m. PST, (Note: On October 28, daylight saving time ended in most areas of the basin, which resulted in the gap between UTC and local time widening by one hour. Hawaii was not affected; the state has not observed daylight saving time since 1945.) October 30) at 12.1°N 122.8°W – Tropical Depression Seventeen-E forms from the interaction of a tropical wave with the ITCZ about 1,130 mi (1,815 km) southwest of Cabo San Lucas.
- 06:00 UTC (10:00 p.m. PST, October 30) at 12.5°N 123.9°W – Tropical Depression Seventeen-E strengthens into Tropical Storm Octave about 1,160 mi (1,870 km) southwest of Cabo San Lucas.

=== November ===
November 1

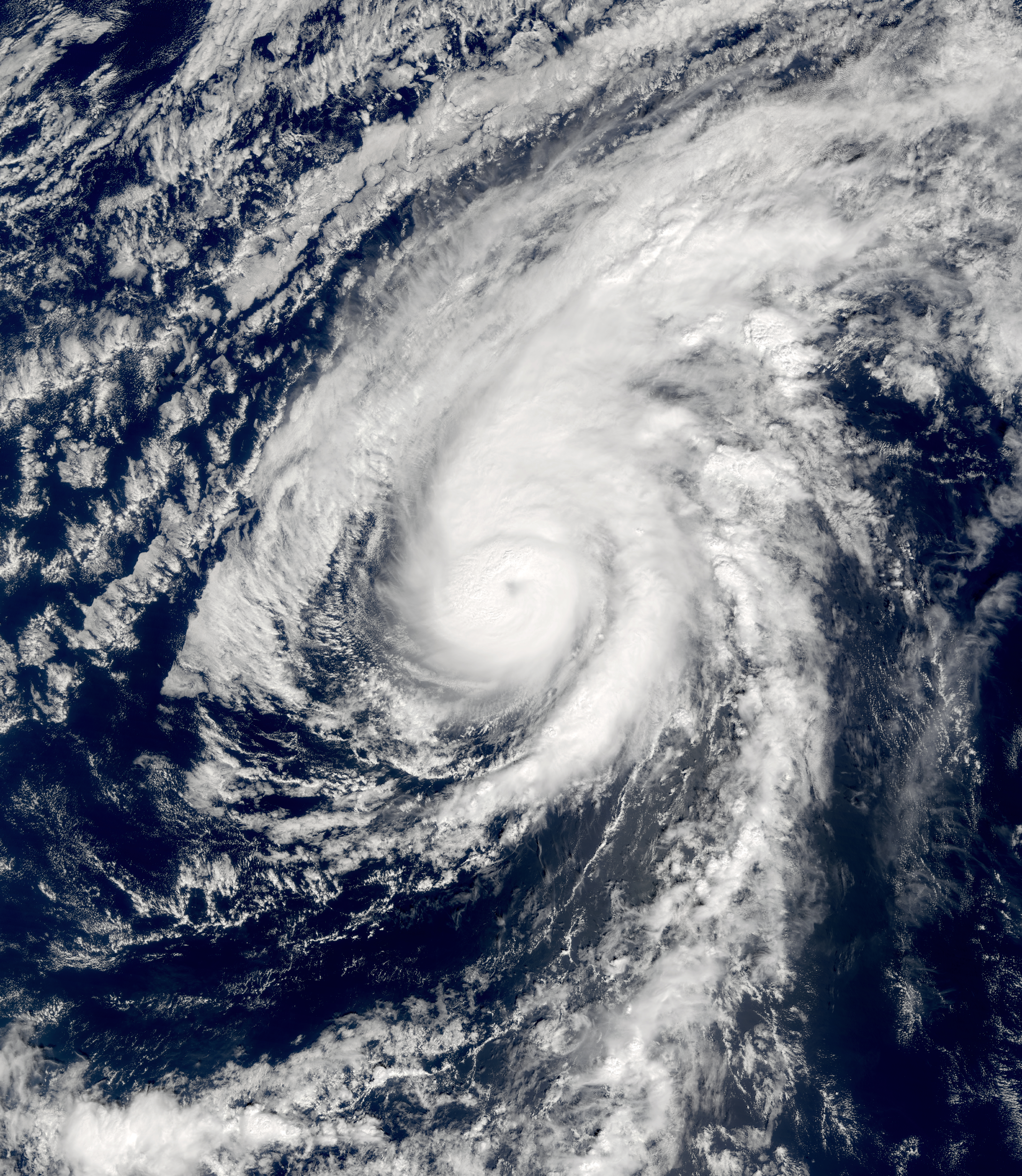
Hurricane Octave strengthening late on November 1

- 18:00 UTC (10:00 a.m. PST) at 15.8°N 128.4°W – Tropical Storm Octave strengthens into a Category 1 hurricane about 1,295 mi (2,085 km) west-southwest of Cabo San Lucas.

November 2

- 00:00 UTC (4:00 p.m. PST, November 1) at 16.5°N 128.6°W – Hurricane Octave attains its peak intensity, with maximum sustained winds of 85 mph (140 km/h) and a minimum central pressure of 980 mbar (28.94 inHg), about 1,290 mi (2,075 km) west-southwest of Cabo San Lucas.
- 18:00 UTC (10:00 a.m. PST) at 17.9°N 129.5°W – Hurricane Octave weakens into a tropical storm about 1,310 mi (2,110 km) west-southwest of Cabo San Lucas.

November 3

- 12:00 UTC (4:00 a.m. PST) at 18.7°N 131.8°W – Tropical Storm Octave weakens into a tropical depression about 1,440 mi (2,315 km) west of Cabo San Lucas.
- 18:00 UTC (10:00 a.m. PST) at 18.8°N 132.5°W – Tropical Depression Octave is last noted as a tropical cyclone about 1,480 mi (2,380 km) west of Cabo San Lucas, degenerating into a remnant low shortly thereafter.

November 30

- The 2001 Pacific hurricane season officially ends.

== See also ==
- Timeline of the 2001 Atlantic hurricane season
- Pacific hurricane season
- Tropical cyclones in 2001
