= List of storms named Juliette =

The name Juliette has been used for eight tropical cyclones in the East Pacific Ocean and one in the South Pacific Ocean. Juliette has also been used for one European windstorm.

In the East Pacific:

- Tropical Storm Juliette (1983) – did not affect land
- Tropical Storm Juliette (1989) – did not affect land
- Hurricane Juliette (1995) – a Category 4 hurricane that stayed out to sea
- Hurricane Juliette (2001) – a Category 4 hurricane that made landfall in Baja California as a tropical storm
- Tropical Storm Juliette (2007) – did not affect land
- Tropical Storm Juliette (2013) – made landfall in Baja California
- Hurricane Juliette (2019) – a Category 3 hurricane that stayed out to sea
- Tropical Storm Juliette (2025) – a strong tropical storm that stayed out to sea

In the South Pacific:

- Cyclone Juliette (1973)

In Europe:

- Storm Juliette (2023)
