= Hurricane Juliette (2001) =

Category 4 Pacific hurricane in 2001

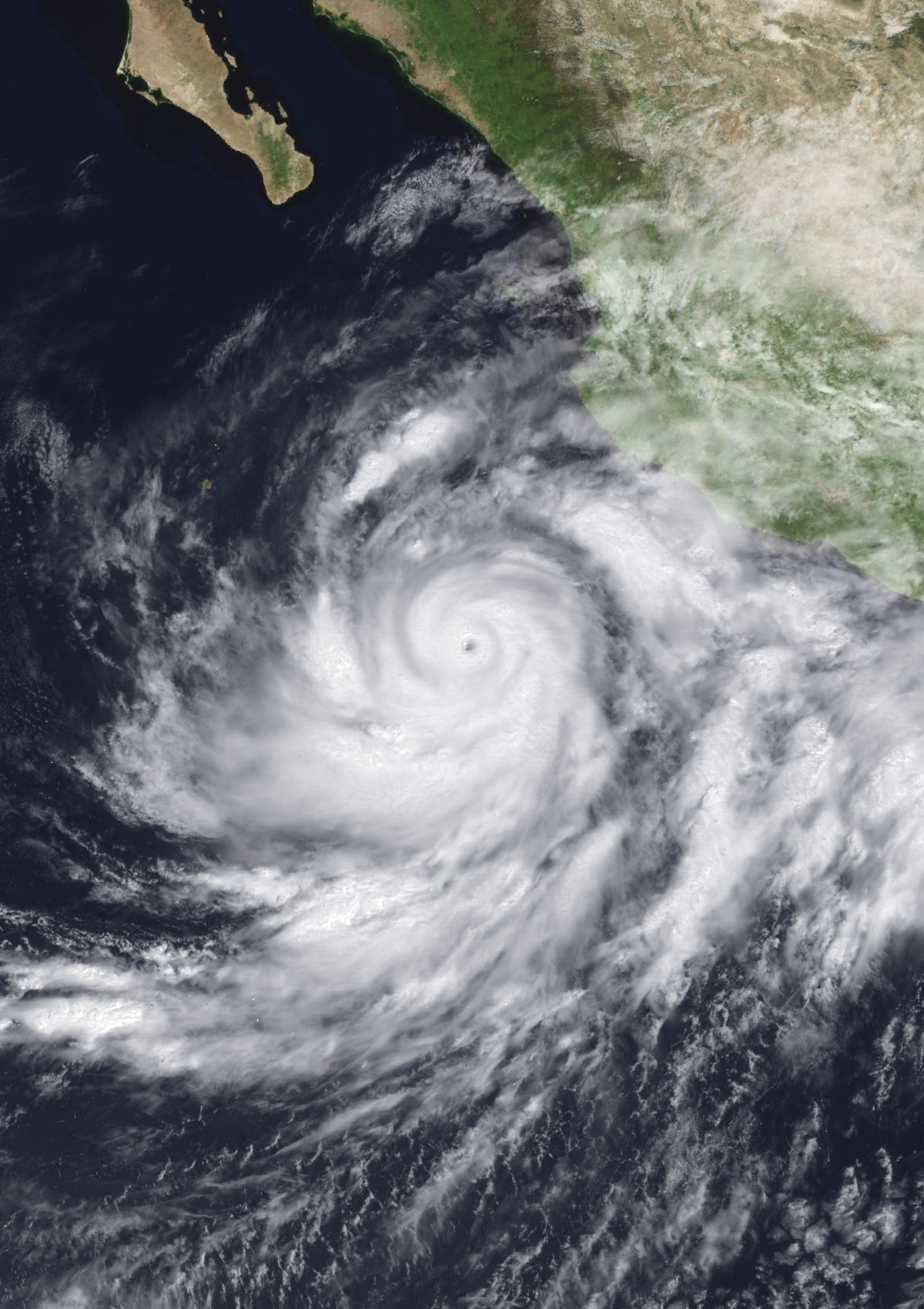
- Juliette at peak intensity off the Mexican coast on September 25

Meteorological history
- Formed: September 21, 2001
- Dissipated: October 3, 2001

Category 4 major hurricane
- 1-minute sustained (SSHWS/NWS)
- Highest winds: 145 mph (230 km/h)
- Lowest pressure: 923 mbar (hPa); 27.26 inHg

Overall effects
- Fatalities: 13 total
- Damage: $400 million (2001 USD)
- Areas affected: Baja California Peninsula, Western Mexico, Southern California, Arizona
- IBTrACS
- Part of the 2001 Pacific hurricane season

Hurricane Juliette was a powerful Pacific hurricane that struck Mexico in September 2001. A long-lived tropical cyclone, Juliette originated from a tropical wave that exited western Africa, the same wave that earlier spawned Atlantic Tropical Depression Nine near Nicaragua on September 19. Two days later, a new tropical depression developed offshore Guatemala, which became Hurricane Juliette by September 22 as it rapidly intensified off western Mexico. On September 24 it strengthened into a Category 4 hurricane on the Saffir-Simpson scale, only to weaken due to an eyewall replacement cycle, then re-intensified a day later to attain maximum sustained winds of 230 km/h (145 mph), with a minimum barometric pressure of 923 mbar (27.3 inHg). Juliette weakened as it moved toward the Baja California peninsula, producing hurricane-force winds and torrential rainfall across Baja California Sur. On September 30 after the hurricane had weakened, Juliette made landfall near San Carlos as a minimal tropical storm. After drifting across the Gulf of California, Juliette dissipated on October 3.

During its path across the Pacific, Juliette affected much of the Pacific coast of Mexico, killing 13 people from Chiapas to the Baja California peninsula. The strongest winds and heaviest rainfall occurred in Baja California Sur, with wind gusts of 174 km/h (108 mph), and a precipitation total of 1,011 mm (39.80 in) recorded at Santiago. Damage in the country reached over Mex$1.755 billion (US$188 million) (Note: All currency totals are unadjusted for inflation.), of which the worst effects were in the state of Sonora. There, the rains over three days equaled the average annual precipitation, which resulted in flooding and landslides. The hurricane also killed a sailor off the coast of Acapulco. Thunderstorms extended into the southwestern United States, knocking down power lines near Palm Springs.

== Meteorological history ==
Map plotting the storm's track and intensity, according to the Saffir–Simpson scale Map key Saffir–Simpson scale Tropical depression (≤38 mph, ≤62 km/h) Tropical storm (39–73 mph, 63–118 km/h) Category 1 (74–95 mph, 119–153 km/h) Category 2 (96–110 mph, 154–177 km/h) Category 3 (111–129 mph, 178–208 km/h) Category 4 (130–156 mph, 209–251 km/h) Category 5 (≥157 mph, ≥252 km/h) Unknown Storm type Tropical cyclone Subtropical cyclone Extratropical cyclone, remnant low, tropical disturbance, or monsoon depression

A tropical wave exited the west coast of Africa on September 11. The wave moved westward across the Atlantic Ocean without development, reaching the Caribbean Sea on September 16. Three days later, the convection expanded and became increasingly organized. At 18:00 UTC on September 19, Tropical Depression Nine developed in the southwestern Caribbean Sea, located about 60 mi (95 km) north-northwest of San Andrés. Upon its formation, the depression already had a circular upper-level outflow, which National Hurricane Center (NHC) forecaster Stacy Stewart described as "impressive... more indicative of a mature tropical cyclone." The NHC anticipated that the westward track would continue, ultimately resulting in a significant tropical cyclone in the eastern Pacific Ocean. The depression moved ashore northeastern Nicaragua early on September 20 near Puerto Cabezas. The city recorded sustained winds of 48 km/h (30 mph). Soon after, the surface circulation dissipated over the mountains of Central America.

The remnants of the depression continued westward into the eastern Pacific Ocean. The system quickly reorganized, and at 06:00 UTC on September 21, a small tropical depression developed about 165 km (105 mi) south of Guatemala. A ridge steered the system west-northwestward, parallel to the coast about 185 to 370 km (115 to 230 mi) offshore. Despite the proximity to land, the small system quickly intensified due to warm water temperatures and light wind shear. At 18:00 UTC on September 21, the NHC initiated advisories on the system, naming it Tropical Storm Juliette, based on observations from the Hurricane Hunters. With the favorable environmental conditions, tropical cyclone forecast models anticipated that the storm would intensify within the next two days. Although the thunderstorms temporarily decreased near its center, Juliette developed good outflow by September 22, a sign of a maturing tropical cyclone. Early the next day, a central dense overcast developed over the circulation as the structure became more symmetrical. Later that day, an eye developed in the center of the convection, and by 12:00 UTC, Juliette attained hurricane status, with maximum sustained winds reaching 120 km/h (75 mph).

Upon becoming a hurricane, Juliette was undergoing rapid intensification. Late on September 23, the hurricane developed a pinhole eye, which was embedded within the central dense overcast, and surrounded by rainbands. Early on September 24, Juliette executed several small cyclonic loops. NHC forecaster Stacy Stewart noted that "this type of erratic motion is not unusual for tropical cyclones that undergo rapid deepening." At 06:00 UTC on September 24, the hurricane attained an initial peak intensity of 215 km/h (130 mph), making Juliette a Category 4 on the Saffir-Simpson scale. It had strengthened by 110 km/h (70 mph) over 24 hours. The tropical cyclone forecast models anticipated further strengthening, possibly to Category 5 intensity. However, the hurricane underwent an eyewall replacement cycle, in which the small inner eye dissipated, causing the winds to drop to 175 km/h (110 mph) by late September 24. By early the next day, a well-defined 19 km (11 mi) eye had redeveloped in the center of the convection, signaling that Juliette was restrengthening. The Hurricane Hunters observed a minimum pressure of 923 mbar (27.3 inHg) on September 25, which at the time was the second-lowest pressure ever recorded in the eastern Pacific Ocean, after Hurricane Ava in 1973. Observations also indicated sustained winds of at least 218 km/h (136 mph), although satellite-estimated winds were as high as 260 km/h (160 mph). The NHC assessed that Juliette attained peak winds of 230 km/h (145 mph).

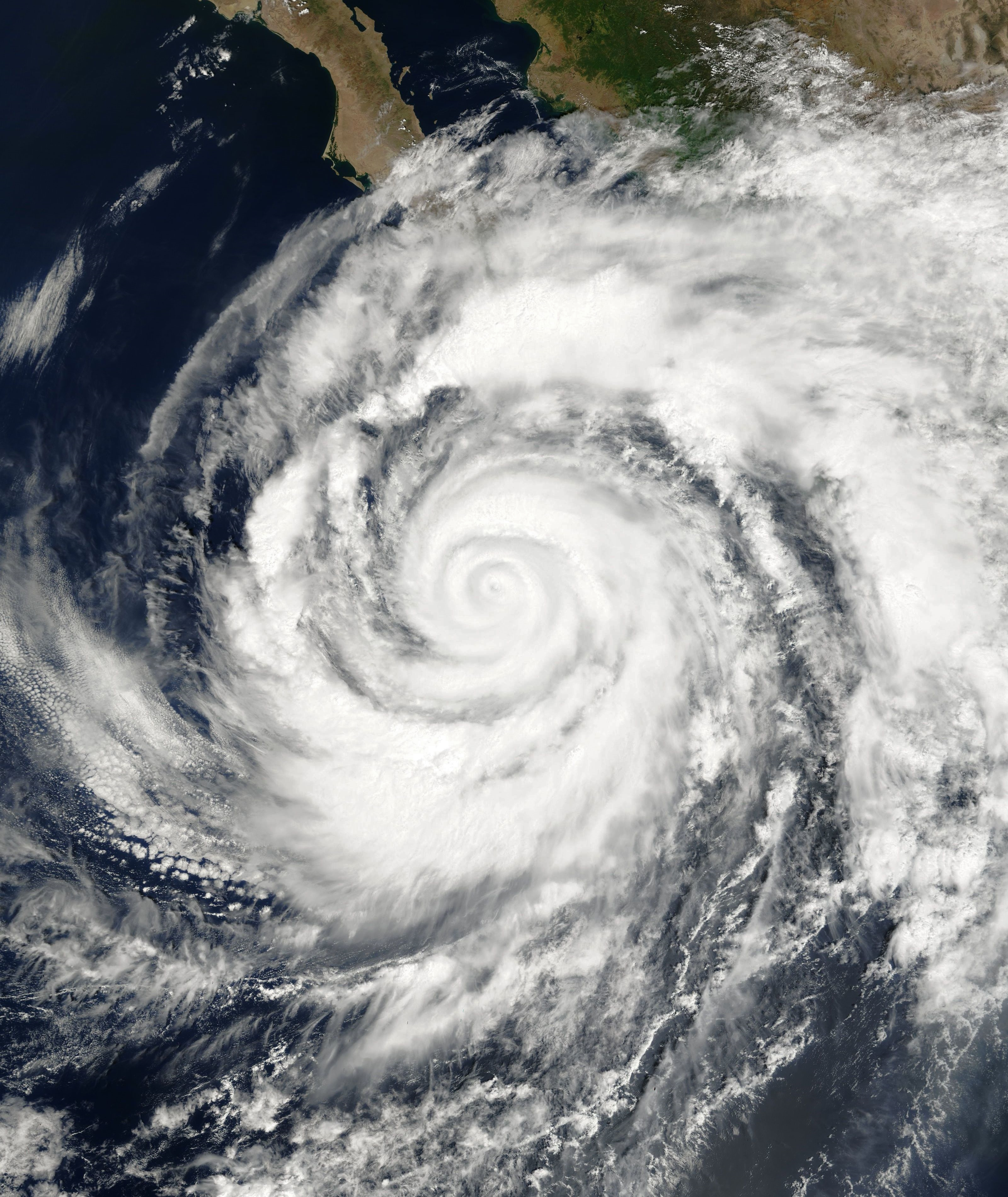
Hurricane Juliette with three simultaneous eyewalls on September 26

Shortly after its peak, Juliette's path turned more to the northwest toward the Baja California peninsula, drawn northward by an eastward-moving trough off the west coast of the United States. Also around that time, the hurricane underwent another eyewall replacement cycle. Early on September 27, the Hurricane Hunters observed three concentric eyewalls, which forecaster Jack Beven described as "a rather uncommon occurrence." By that time, Juliette was weakening as its convective organization deteriorated. Early on September 28, the hurricane passed about 110 km (70 mi) west of Cabo San Lucas along the southern tip of the Baja California peninsula. Around that time, Juliette had sustained winds of 130 km/h (80 mph), with diminished thunderstorms near the center. The combination of land interaction and cooler temperatures caused the hurricane to weaken further, and Juliette briefly dropped to tropical storm status late on September 28. Its motion also slowed, as the trough to the north had weakened. The thunderstorms redeveloped over the center early on September 29, and Juliette re-intensified to hurricane status for about 12 hours, only to weaken again due to land interaction. By late on September 29, the circulation was exposed from the convection, although rainbands extended far from the center into the southwestern United States. At around 00:00 UTC on September 30, Juliette made landfall near San Carlos, Baja California Sur, with winds of about 65 km/h (40 mph).

Soon after moving over land, Juliette weakened into a tropical depression and became disorganized, as stronger wind shear stripped the thunderstorms from the circulation. It quickly crossed the Baja California peninsula and emerged into the Gulf of California, although the NHC noted the possibility that the original circulation dissipated over land and a new one formed over water. A building ridge turned the circulation northwestward as thunderstorms redeveloped. The NHC discontinued advisories on October 1 while Juliette was near Tiburón Island, assessing that the depression moved inland. Instead, the circulation continued to the northwest over water, and the NHC resumed advisories on October 2, after Juliette generated enough thunderstorms to be re-designated a tropical depression. Moving westward, the circulation dissipated on October 3 in the northern Gulf of California, just offshore Puertecitos.

== Preparations ==
Upon Juliette's designation as a tropical cyclone on September 21, the government of Mexico began issuing various tropical cyclone warnings and watches for southern portions of the country, as far as east as Salina Cruz, Oaxaca. Although these initial warnings were dropped on September 22, additional tropical storm warnings were issued a day later for southwestern Mexico. The government of Mexico issued tropical storm warnings for the southern Baja California peninsula on September 26, two days before Juliette's closest approach to the region. A day later, the government of Mexico issued hurricane warnings between Cabo San Lázaro along the west coast of the peninsula to El Burro along the east coast. In addition, tropical storm warnings were posted for the eastern coastline of the Gulf of California from Mazatlán to Yavaros. The watches and warnings were canceled as Juliette weakened.

In southern Mexico, the threat of Juliette prompted ports to close in Acapulco and Zihuatanejo. During the storm passage, all airports in Baja California Sur were closed. Throughout the state, about 6,000 people made use of 45 shelters. Throughout Sonora, officials set up 169 shelters, which were ultimately used by 16,365 people.

== Impact ==
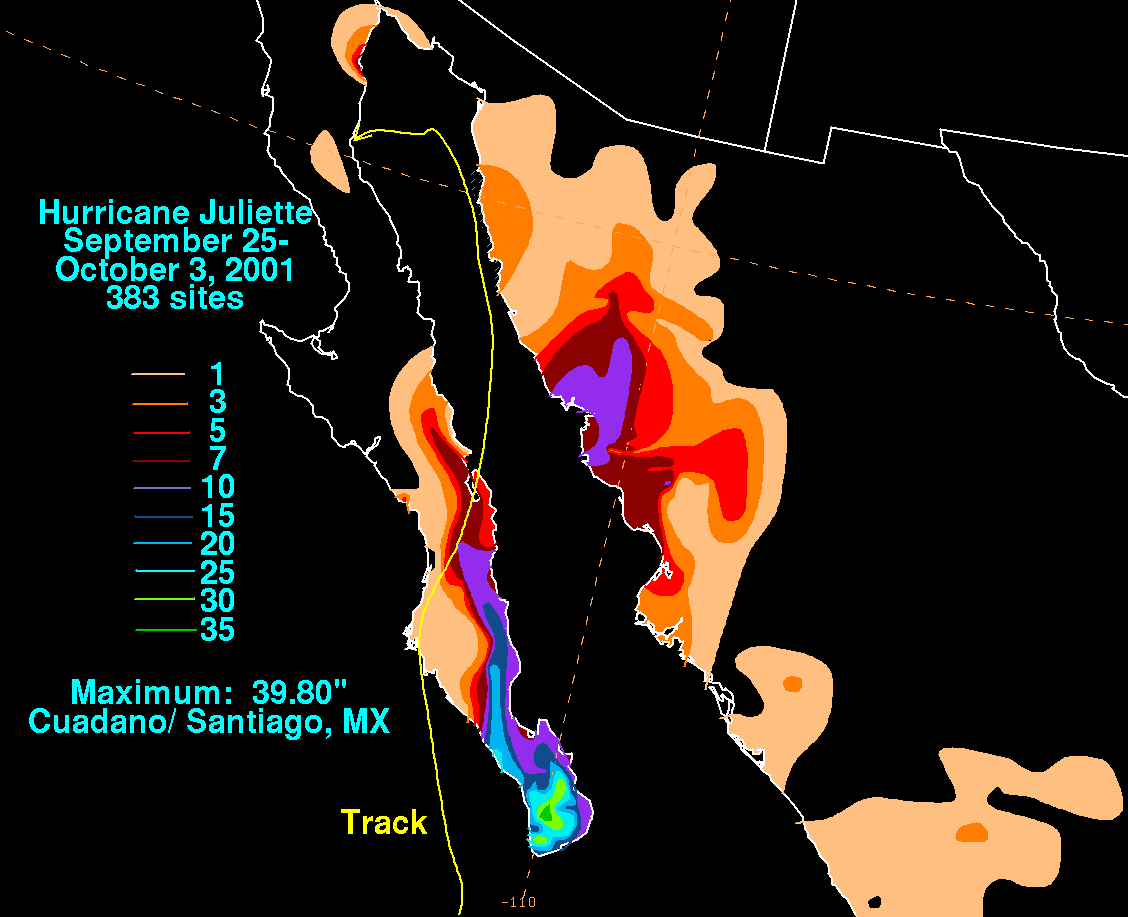
Storm total rainfall for Juliette

=== Mexico ===
A large cyclone, Juliette affected much of the Pacific coast of Mexico with clouds, rainfall, and high waves, particularly the states of Baja California Sur and Sonora. A weather station in Cabo San Lucas recorded sustained winds of 141 km/h (87 mph), with gusts to 174 km/h (108 mph). In Hermosillo, wind gusts reached 167 km/h (104 mph). Earlier while Juliette was offshore southern Mexico, it produced gusts of 74 km/h (46 mph) in Manzanillo. The heaviest rainfall occurred along the southern tip of the Baja California peninsula, with a maximum precipitation total of 1,011 mm (39.80 in) recorded at Santiago. This was among the wettest known tropical cyclones in northwestern Mexico. In neighboring Baja California, Juliette produced a rainfall total of 261 mm (10.28 in). Also in the state, the highest 24 hour rainfall total in the country was 207.2 mm (8.16 in) in San Felipe. Across the Gulf of California, parts of Sonora experienced significant rainfall, the equivalent of a year's worth of precipitation over three days. A station along the Mayo River recorded 380 mm (15 in).

Throughout Mexico, Juliette killed at least 13 people. Deadly rains occurred as far east as Chiapas where three people died – two due to river floods entering homes, and the other due to a mudslide. A fisherman near Acapulco drowned amid high seas. There were also two deaths in Baja California Sur, one of whom was an American surfer. There were another seven fatalities in Sonora. Between Baja California Sur and Sonora, Juliette damaged 18,873 houses and 273 schools. The combined damage total between the two states was Mex$1.755 billion (US$188 million). Damage across all of Mexico was estimated at US$400 million.

The heaviest damage was in Sonora, where the rains led to flash flooding along several river valleys, including the Mayo, Yaqui, San Marcial, and Sonora rivers. The floodwater exceeded the capacity of water systems, causing landslides and road damage, including along Mexican Federal Highway 15. Floodwaters temporarily isolated the city of Empalme, affecting 300 families. In Ciudad Obregón and Huatabampo, the floods damaged the roofs of the main hospitals. Statewide, the storm destroyed 4,325 houses and forced 38,000 people from their homes, with the most significant housing damage in Cajeme, Etchojoa, Guaymas, and Huatabampo. Access to water wells was disrupted when electrical equipment was damaged. The floods also damaged agriculture and fishing industries, with thousands of shrimp killed.

The extreme rainfall led to widespread flooding across the Baja California peninsula, triggering at least 419 landslides. The storm damaged 2,296 km (1,427 mi) of primary and rural roadways across Baja California Sur. In the state, the cost of storm damage as well as disaster mitigation projects was Mex$850.15 million (US$91 million). This represented 11% of the state's gross domestic product for the year. At least eight people sustained injuries related to the hurricane, and the fire department responded to 61 events, including rescuing six people and two dogs from a flooded stream. Juliette damaged 3,529 houses across the state, including 615 that were destroyed. Many of the destroyed homes in Cabo San Lucas were in high-risk areas, with 800 people evacuated from vulnerable houses. The winds tore the roofs off several houses, with one roof flung an estimated 14 m (45 ft). At the resort hotels in Los Cabos, floodwaters washed sand into pools while the winds damaged windows. The storm also knocked down 197 power poles or towers, causing disruptions to telephone access. A hospital was damaged in Los Cabos, as well as six businesses involving water recreation. There was also minor crop damage and 2,000 cattle killed across the region. High waves wrecked docks near Los Cabos. In Laz Paz, the high winds and heavy rainfall knocked over 23 boats in the marina.

In Oaxaca in southeastern Mexico, rains from the hurricane washed away two bridges. Near Acapulco, the strong winds knocked down trees. Across Guerrero, heavy rains triggered flash floods that washed out two bridges and destroyed 20 homes. Throughout Michoacán, an estimated 1,000 people were left homeless by the hurricane. In the Gulf of California, rough waves sank a dive boat with 16 people on board, who survived on a lifeboat and a dinghy – one group drifted for 100 km (60 mi) before reaching the Sonoran coast, and the other group was rescued by the Mexican Navy.

=== Southwestern United States ===
As Juliette moved into northwestern Mexico, it produced clouds and thunderstorms across the southwestern United States. In California, the thunderstorms produced a dust storm, and a wind gust of 39 mph (63 km/h) recorded at Palm Springs International Airport. Winds knocked down trees and power lines. Rainfall in the United States peaked at 23 millimetres (.9 in) in Patagonia, Arizona.

== Aftermath ==
Following the significant damage across southern states, Mexico deployed its military to deliver 50 tons of food and water to the Los Cabos region. The Mexican Army sent aircraft and medical teams. Three electric restoration workers died when their helicopter crashed. As reports of damage began to come out of Baja California Sur, the state governor declared the entire area a disaster zone. On October 2, all five municipalities in Baja California were declared a state of emergency, which made federal resources available for the region. Due to the road damage, supplies were unable to be driven into Los Cabos, which required food and fuel to be transported there by ship. Businesses there closed for over a week. The damage and disruptions caused a 50% reduction in tourism activity in Los Cabos for about 20 days, a lull in travel also partly attributable to the September 11 attacks in the United States earlier in the month. For several days, banking activity in the resort city was down due to damage to fiber optic lines. Schools in the state were disrupted for about a week. All roads were reopened within five days of the storm, with full access restored in another ten. Within 16 days of the storm's landfall, all rural areas had power restored. Two restaurants severely damaged by Juliette reopened within a few weeks. In Sinaloa, hundreds of workers removed debris from roads. The Sonoran government estimated the cost of rebuilding and rehousing people at Mex$180.5 million (US$19.36 million). The damaged schools disrupted classes for three weeks, while repairs were made to roofing and fences. Some people remained in shelters for 20 days. Officials distributed items such as mattresses, food, and drinks; health workers assisted by assisting building latrines, providing vaccinations, and dispensing medical advice.

== See also ==
- Other storms named Juliette
- List of Category 4 Pacific hurricanes
- List of Baja California Peninsula hurricanes
