= Tropical Depression Twelve-E (2011) =

Pacific tropical depression in 2011

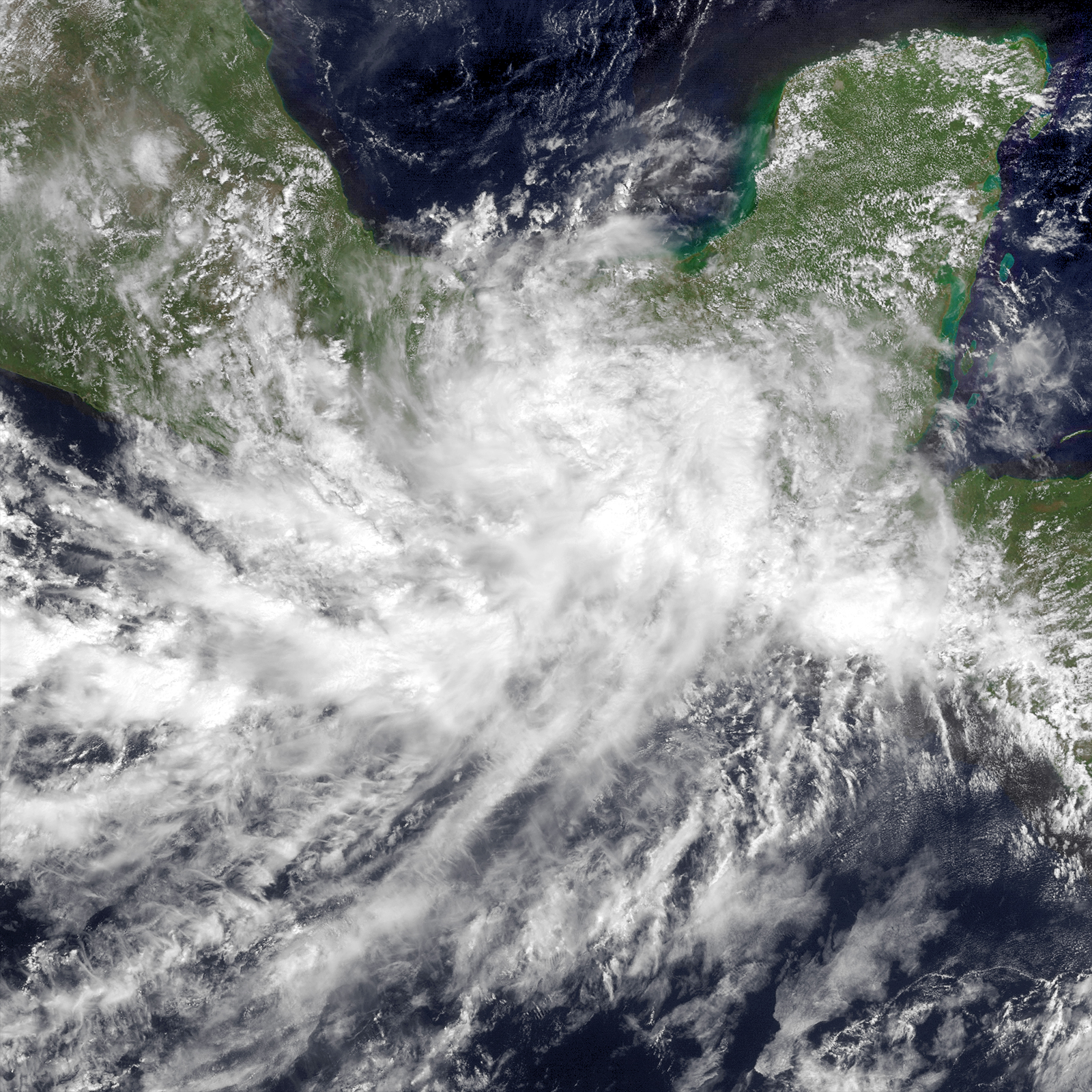
- Twelve-E just off the coast of Mexico.

Meteorological history
- Formed: October 12, 2011
- Dissipated: October 12, 2011

Tropical depression
- 1-minute sustained (SSHWS/NWS)
- Highest winds: 35 mph (55 km/h)
- Lowest pressure: 1004 mbar (hPa); 29.65 inHg

Overall effects
- Fatalities: 36 killed by depression 123 deaths due to broader monsoon system
- Damage: $650 million
- Areas affected: Southwestern Mexico, Central America
- IBTrACS
- Part of the 2011 Pacific hurricane season

In October 2011, Tropical Depression Twelve-E and a related monsoon trough produced damaging and deadly floods across parts of Central America, killing 123 people. Over a ten-day period, heavy rainfall accumulated in parts of Central America, peaking at 59.6 in (1,513 mm), recorded in Huizucar, El Salvador. The floods left more than US$650 million in damage, including US$200 million in agriculture damage. Although the depression was a short-lived tropical cyclone, it was embedded within a monsoon trough that extended from the Caribbean Sea across the eastern Pacific Ocean.

The depression developed from a tropical wave that previously spawned Atlantic Hurricane Philippe. It crossed Central America into the eastern Pacific Ocean, where it interacted with the monsoon trough and the Intertropical Convergence Zone. A low pressure area formed on October 6 to the south of the Mexico/Guatemala border. The low looped off the coast, waxing and waning in organization due to wind shear. After a period of sustained organization, the low developed into Tropical Depression Twelve-E on October 12 just off the coast of Mexico. Later that day, it moved ashore and the circulation dissipated within the trough. By October 15, the system resembled an overland monsoon depression. It slowly moved northward across the Yucatán peninsula and the Gulf of Mexico.

== Meteorological history ==
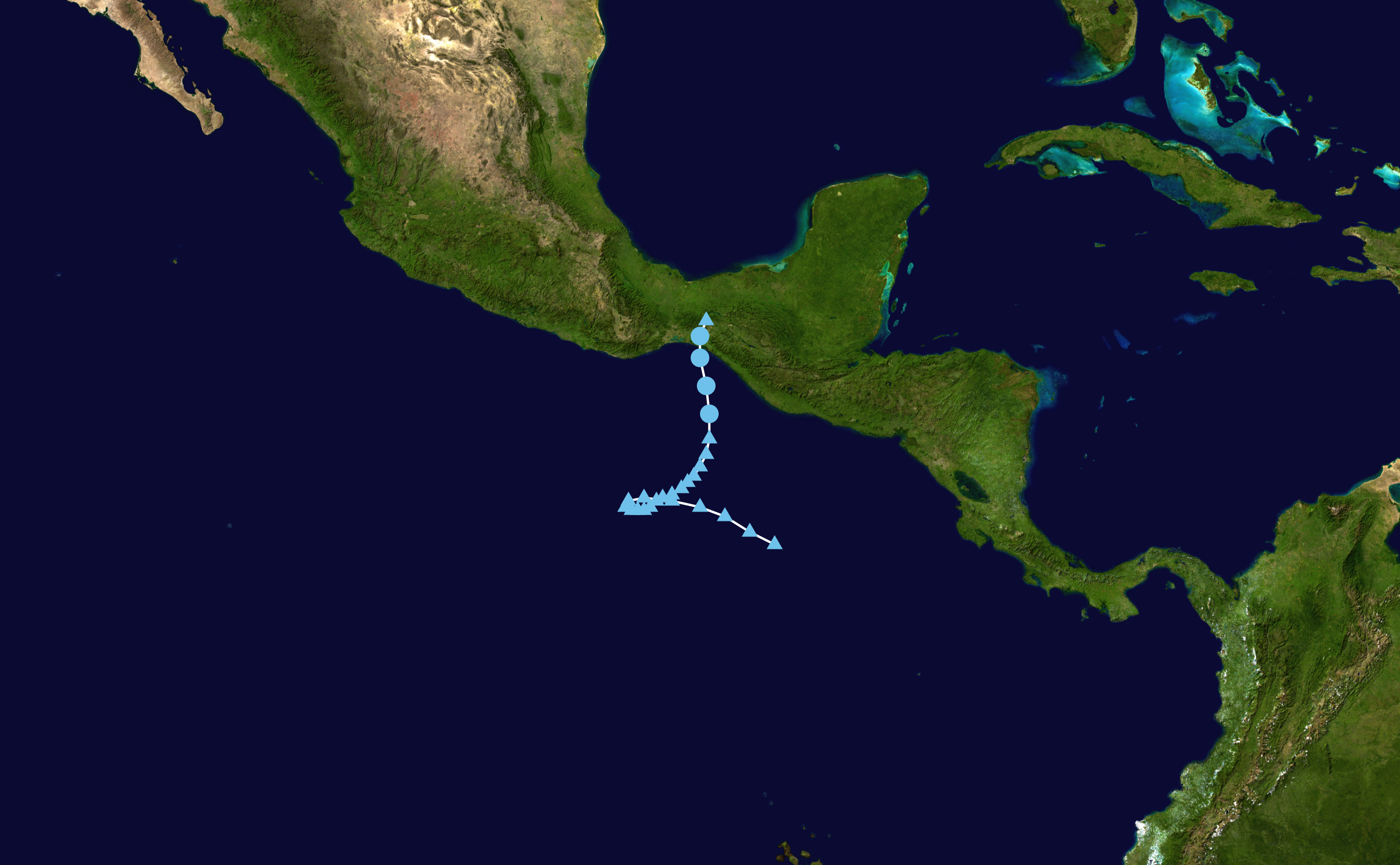
Map plotting the storm's track and intensity, according to the Saffir–Simpson scale Map key Saffir–Simpson scale Tropical depression (≤38 mph, ≤62 km/h) Tropical storm (39–73 mph, 63–118 km/h) Category 1 (74–95 mph, 119–153 km/h) Category 2 (96–110 mph, 154–177 km/h) Category 3 (111–129 mph, 178–208 km/h) Category 4 (130–156 mph, 209–251 km/h) Category 5 (≥157 mph, ≥252 km/h) Unknown Storm type Tropical cyclone Subtropical cyclone Extratropical cyclone, remnant low, tropical disturbance, or monsoon depression

On September 22, a tropical wave exited the west coast of Africa, which spawned Atlantic Hurricane Philippe. The wave continued to the west, crossing Central America on October 5. The wave entered an active monsoon trough that extended from northern Colombia into the eastern Pacific Ocean. A pulse in the Madden–Julian oscillation enhanced low-level flow across the eastern Pacific, creating conditions favorable for tropical cyclogenesis. The Intertropical Convergence Zone (ITCZ) spawned hurricanes Jova and Irwin off southwestern Mexico, while also spawning another low pressure area late on October 6 about 345 mi (555 km) south of the Mexico/Guatemala border. The low produced intermittent convection, or thunderstorms, while encountering wind shear. Embedded within the ITCZ, it moved slowly west-northwestward before looping to the north. The thunderstorms and circulation became better defined on October 8, only to become displaced west of the circulation. Late on October 11, the convection produced a sustained area of organized convection. At 00:00 UTC on October 12, the National Hurricane Center (NHC) designated the system as Tropical Depression Twelve-E about 185 mi (295 km) southeast of Salina Cruz, Oaxaca.

After its development, the tropical depression continued northward over warm waters. NHC forecaster Todd Kimberlain described the depression's structure as "characteristic of a monsoon-type tropical cyclone, with the strongest winds well removed from the center." At 16:00 UTC on October 12, the depression moved ashore Mexico between Salina Cruz, Oaxaca and Arriaga, Chiapas. On October 13, the depression degenerated into a remnant low and quickly dissipated over land. Around that time, the monsoon trough extended from southeastern Mexico into the northwest Caribbean Sea. On October 15, NHC forecaster Andrew Levine noted that the system resembled a "monsoon depression" over Central America. By the next day, the circulation reached the Yucatán peninsula, and was producing winds of near tropical storm-force over water. On October 17, the low reached the Gulf of Mexico, where strong wind shear displaced the thunderstorms from the center. The gulf low continued to the north and moved ashore the Florida panhandle, where it was absorbed by an occluded front. Monsoon conditions persisted across Central America, and heavy rainfall continued until October 20.

== Preparations and impact ==
The Mexican government issued a tropical storm warning from Barra De Tonala to the Guatemala–Mexico border. Embedded within a broader monsoonal system, the depression dropped heavy rainfall across Mexico and Guatemala. In Mexico, rainfall from the depression reached 8.27 in (210.1 mm) in Santa Cruz, Chiapas.

Across Central America, ten days of heavy rainfall produced floods that killed 123 people. Crop damage across the region totaled at least US$300 million.

In Guatemala, rainfall totaled more than 12 in (305 mm) due to the depression and associated monsoon trough. The rains produced floods that killed 39 people in the country, of whom 36 were directly killed by the depression. The floods damaged 15,922 homes in Guatemala. The country's road network was disrupted after 30 bridges were destroyed and 160 highways were damaged. The country declared a National Public State of Calamity due to the floods. Extensive flooding and multiple landslides caused heavy damage to roads, cutting them off to traffic. The profuse rainwater filled up rivers, causing them to overflow and exacerbating the flooding.

In El Salvador, rainfall totaled 59.6 in (1,513 mm) in Huizucar. The floods inundated about 10% of the country, killing 35 people. Damage totaled $650 million, including $200 million in agriculture damage. At least 59,000 people evacuated after 22,000 homes were flooded. The floods destroyed 1,193 homes and damaged another 9,082. At least 21 rivers burst their banks due to the flooding rains, while numerous mudslides inflicted damage to roads. Heavy damage also occurred to crop, particularly in coffee, beans, and maize plantains.

In Nicaragua, the floods killed 16 people. More than 10,000 people fled to emergency shelters after 8,924 homes were submerged. The floods destroyed 335 homes and damaged another 1,235. Water service was disrupted after the floods destroyed 90 wells and 426 latrines. The transportation network was disrupted after 399 km (248 mi) of roads damaged, with power lines and poles also damaged. The floods also damaged 17,500 ha (43,000 acres) worth of fields, or 13% of the country's agricultural areas.

Rainfall in Honduras peaked at 49.4 in (1,256 mm). The floods killed 28 people in the country. The floods destroyed 159 homes and damaged another 2,160, forcing more than 12,000 people to evacuate. The transport network was disrupted after 12 bridges were destroyed and another 19 were damaged. The floods also damaged 92 schools. Crops and electrical systems were also affected.

Floods in Costa Rica killed five people, while displacing about 1,000 people. Landslides closed a road connecting the country's capital, San José, to Caldera Port. In Panama, landslides injured two people, and also forced about 800 people to evacuate.

The remnant weather system in the Gulf of Mexico produced heavy rainfall in Florida, peaking at 21.46 in (545 mm) on Big Coppitt Key. The Florida Keys had their wettest five-day period since 1983. In Key West, floodwaters reached 4 ft (1.2 m) deep, causing cars to stall. The weather system also spawned five tornadoes in Florida, including an EF2 on the Enhanced Fujita scale that hit Sunrise. The tornado damaged 136 buildings, including a few mobile homes that were destroyed, with damage totaling $4 million. The other tornadoes were all rated EF0. Rainfall from the system spread as far as Kentucky and Virginia.

== See also ==
- October 2008 Central America floods - deadly floods also produced by a tropical depression
