= 2011 Pacific hurricane season =

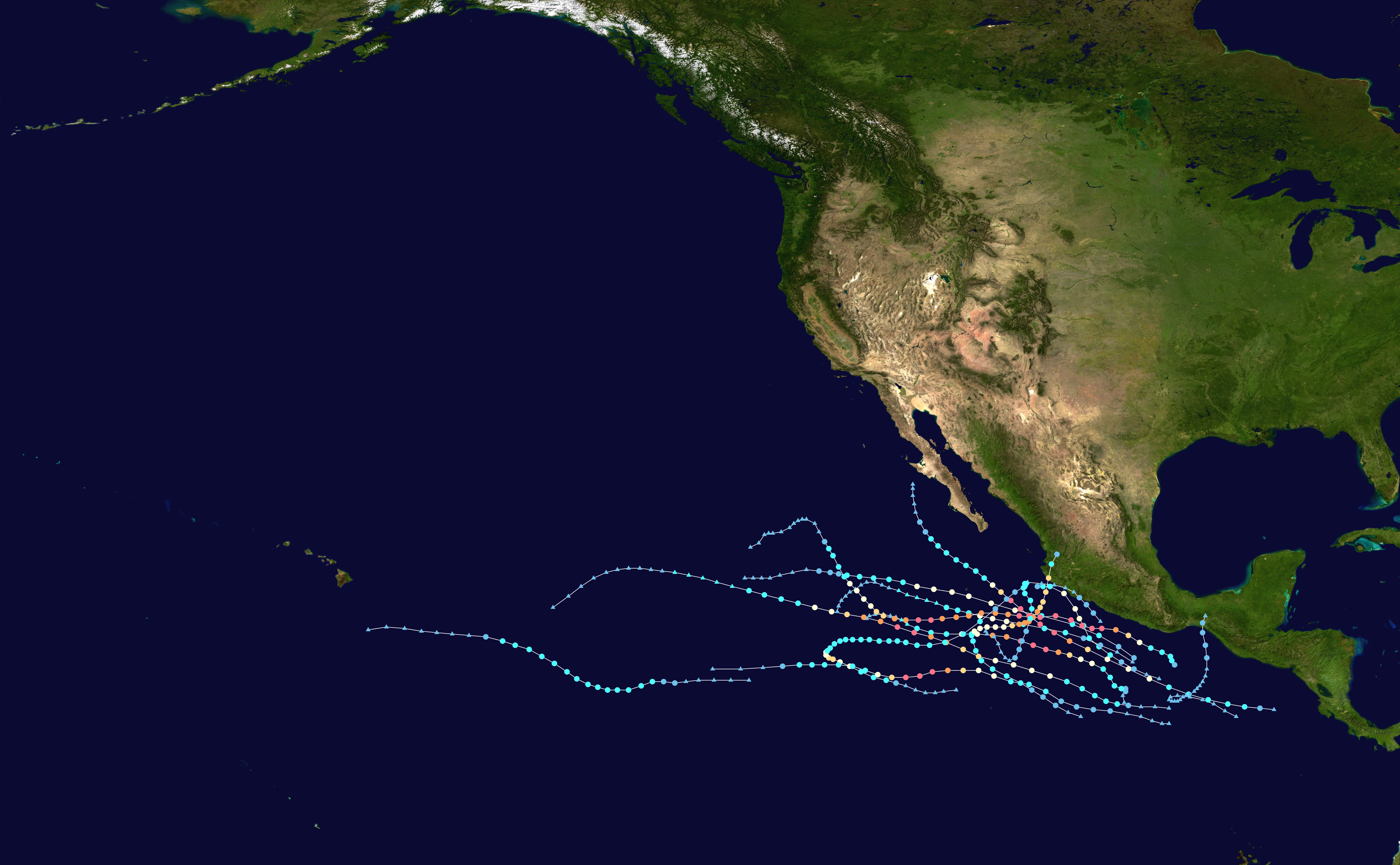
- Season summary map

Seasonal boundaries
- First system formed: June 7, 2011
- Last system dissipated: November 25, 2011

Strongest storm
- Name: Dora
  - Maximum winds: 155 mph (250 km/h) (1-minute sustained)
  - Lowest pressure: 929 mbar (hPa; 27.43 inHg)

Seasonal statistics
- Total depressions: 13
- Total storms: 11
- Hurricanes: 10
- Major hurricanes (Cat. 3+): 6
- ACE: 120.9
- Total fatalities: 52 total
- Total damage: > $204 million (2011 USD)

Related articles
- Timeline of the 2011 Pacific hurricane season; 2011 Atlantic hurricane season; 2011 Pacific typhoon season; 2011 North Indian Ocean cyclone season

The 2011 Pacific hurricane season was a below average season in terms of named storms, although it had an above average number of hurricanes and major hurricanes. During the season, 13 tropical depressions formed along with 11 tropical storms, 10 hurricanes and 6 major hurricanes. The season officially began on May 15 in the East Pacific Ocean, and on June 1 in the Central Pacific; they both ended on November 30. These dates conventionally delimit the period of each year when most tropical cyclones form in the Pacific basin. The season's first cyclone, Hurricane Adrian formed on June 7, and the last, Hurricane Kenneth, dissipated on November 25.

Despite the decrease in storms, there were several intense and destructive hurricanes this season. Hurricane Beatriz killed four people in Southwestern Mexico. Hurricane Jova killed eight and caused $203.67 million (2011 USD) in damage to Western Mexico. Tropical Depression Twelve-E killed 30 people in Central America. Meanwhile, Kenneth became the strongest November storm at the time. Hurricane Hilary killed three fishermen in Southwestern Mexico.

== Seasonal forecasts ==
Predictions of tropical activity in the 2011 season
Source	Date	Named storms	Hurricanes	Major hurricanes	Ref
Average (1981–2010)		15.6	8.6	4.1
Average (1995–2010)		14	7	3
Record high activity		27	16 (Tie)	11
Record low activity		8 (Tie)	3	0 (Tie)
CPC	May 19, 2011	9–15	5–8	1–3
Actual activity		11	10	6

In advance of each Pacific hurricane season, forecasts of hurricane activity are issued by the United States National Oceanic and Atmospheric Administration (NOAA)'s Climate Prediction Center and Mexico's Servicio Meteorológico Nacional (SMN). These include weekly and monthly changes in significant factors that help determine the number of tropical storms, hurricanes, and major hurricanes within a particular year. According to NOAA, the average eastern Pacific hurricane season between 1981 and 2010 contained roughly 14 tropical storms, 7 hurricanes, 3 major hurricanes, with a near-normal accumulated cyclone energy (ACE) index of 113. Broadly speaking, ACE is a measure of the power of a tropical storm multiplied by the length of time it existed. It is only calculated for full advisories on specific tropical systems reaching or exceeding wind speeds of 39 mph (63 km/h). NOAA typically categorizes a season as above-average, average, or below-average based on the cumulative ACE index, but the number of tropical storms, hurricanes, and major hurricanes within a hurricane season is sometimes also considered.

On May 19, the Climate Prediction Center released its pre-season outlook. The scientists stated a 70% chance of a below-normal season, a 25% chance of a near-normal season and a 5% chance of an above-normal season. The climatologists expected 9–15 named storms, with 5–8 becoming hurricanes, and 1–3 becoming major hurricanes. The accumulated cyclone energy was expected to be 45 to 105% of the median. The below-normal activity forecast was because of increased wind shear and a high expectation of El Niño–Southern Oscillation (ENSO)-neutral conditions (no El Niño or La Niña) throughout the peak months of July, August and September, together with lingering La Niña conditions at the beginning of the season.

== Seasonal summary ==
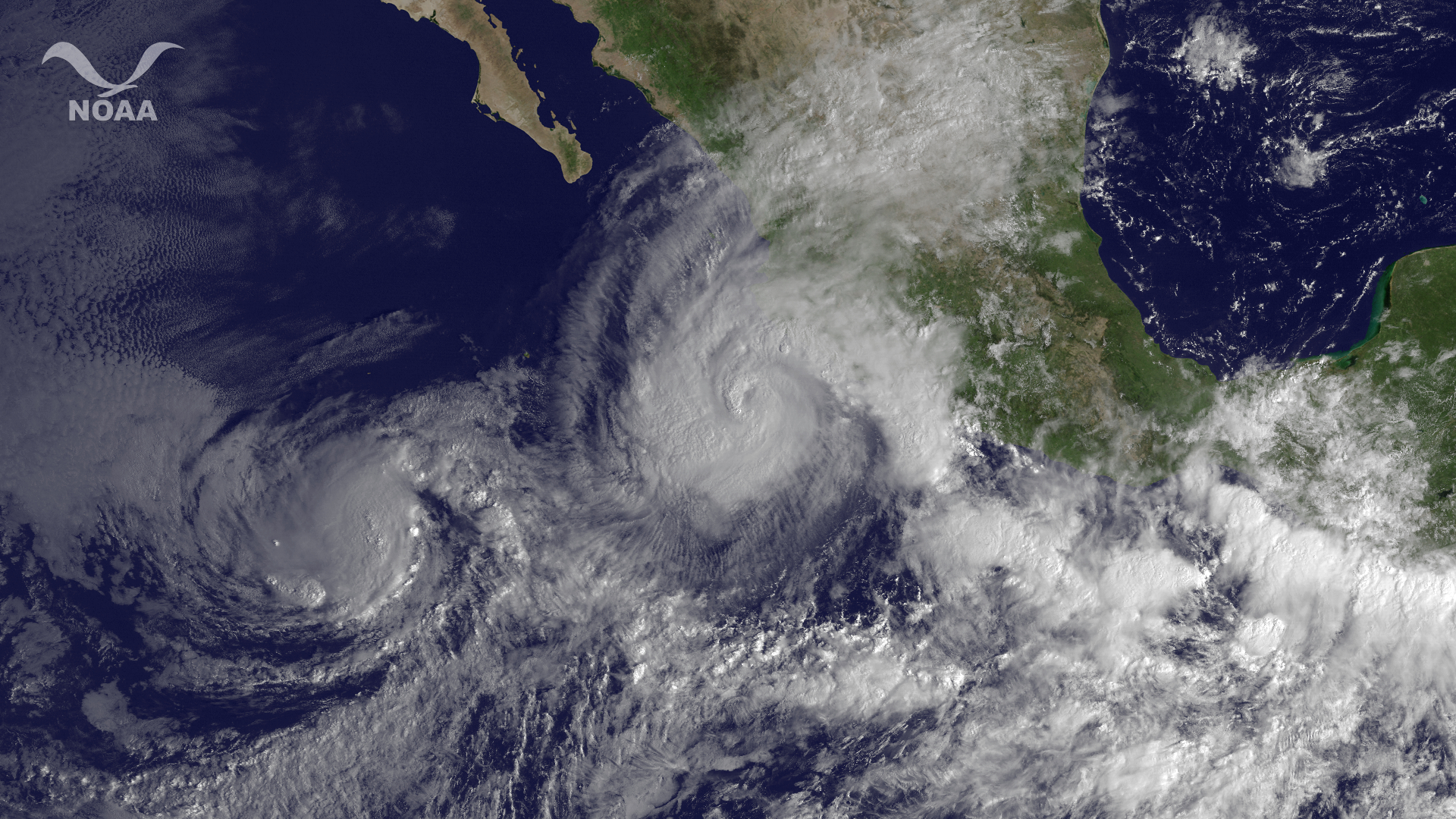
In the eastern Pacific, two simultaneous systems on October 11: Tropical Storm Irwin (left) and Hurricane Jova (right)

The season got off to an active start with first storm, Adrian, becoming one of only a handful of tropical cyclones to attain Category 4 status in June. Four other storms, Dora, Eugene, Hilary, and Kenneth attained Category 4 status. Dora was the strongest storm of the year, peaking at 155 mph, just short of Category 5 status. The month of August was about average in terms of the number of storms, with the strongest of the month being Eugene. However, the first half of September had very little activity, due to the return of a La Niña event. Tropical Depression Eight-E was the only storm in the first half of September, when it dissipated on September 1.

Hilary became the second storm to form in September, becoming the fourth major hurricane of the season, during the afternoon hours of September 22. After Hilary, Jova unexpectedly became the fifth major hurricane of the season during the early morning hours of October 10. Tropical Depression Twelve-E killed 30 people in Central America when it made landfall near El Salvador on October 12. On November 19, Kenneth formed as a tropical depression and quickly strengthened into a hurricane two days later. Kenneth became the first major hurricane in November and latest-forming major hurricane in the eastern north Pacific basin in the satellite era, until being surpassed by Hurricane Sandra in 2015; the last to do so was Winnie in 1983, which only peaked at Category 1 hurricane status. Hurricane Kenneth, however, intensified to attain Category 4 status on November 22, which broke the record at the time.

The accumulated cyclone energy (ACE) index for the 2011 Pacific hurricane season as calculated by Colorado State University using data from the National Hurricane Center was 120.9 units. (Note: The total represents the sum of the squares of the maximum sustained wind speed (knots) for every tropical storm's intensity of over 33 knots (38 mph; 61 km/h), divided by 10,000 while they are above that threshold; therefore, tropical depressions are not included.) Broadly speaking, ACE is a measure of the power of a tropical storm multiplied by the length of time it existed. It is only calculated for full advisories on specific tropical systems reaching or exceeding wind speeds of 39 mph (63 km/h).

== Systems ==
=== Hurricane Adrian ===
- Category 4 hurricane (SSHWS)
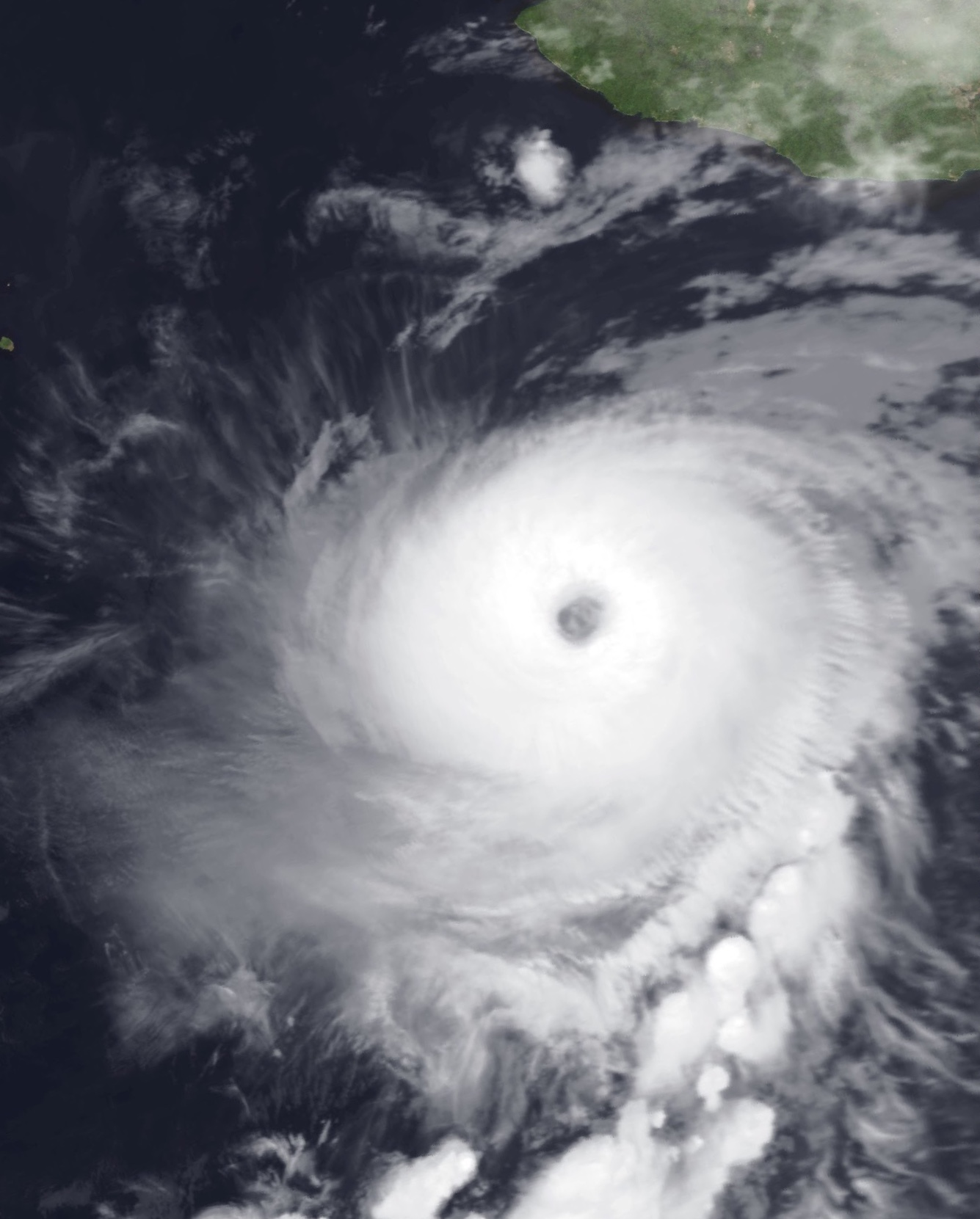
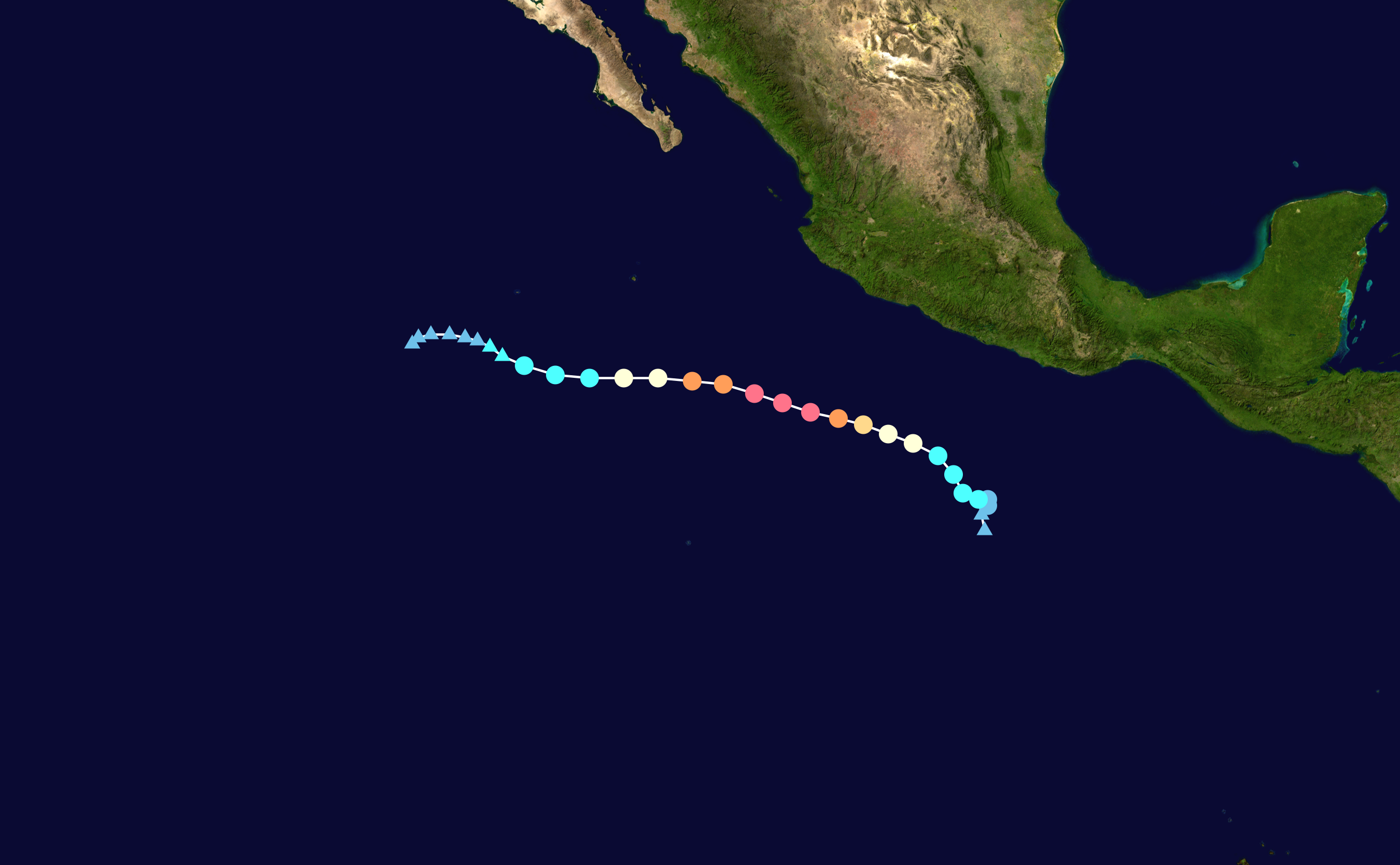
- Duration: June 7 – June 12
- Peak intensity: 140 mph (220 km/h) (1-min); 944 mbar (hPa)

On May 31, the Intertropical Convergence Zone produced an area of convection south of the Gulf of Tehuantepec. The system remained disorganized for several days, until the circulation became more defined on June 6. At 12:00 UTC on June 7, it developed into Tropical Depression One-E about 370 mi (600 km) south of Acapulco, Mexico. The depression strengthened into Tropical Storm Adrian 12 hours later. With light wind shear and ocean temperatures near 86 °F (30 °C), Adrian intensified further while moving northwestward. An eye-like feature developed in the center of the central dense overcast (CDO). At 00:00 UTC on June 9, Adrian attained hurricane status as it began a period of rapid deepening. The eye became well-defined, reaching a diameter of 23 to 29 mi (37 to 47 km), while surrounded by a ring of intense thunderstorms with symmetrical outflow. About 24 hours later on June 10, Adrian reached peak winds of 140 mph (220 km/h) about 320 mi (515 km) south-southwest of Manzanillo, and a minimum pressure of 944 mbar, as estimated from satellite imagery. This made it a Category 4 hurricane. Soon after peaking, Adrian encountered cooler waters and stronger wind shear, resulting in rapid weakening. Late on June 11, it dropped to tropical storm status, as the track shifted more to the west. After losing all of its convection, Adrian transitioned into a post-tropical cyclone on June 12, which dissipated two days later.

Across the southwestern Mexican coastline, Adrian sent waves up to 13 ft (4.0 m) high, generating swells and rough seas. The storm's outer rainbands produced rain in the states of Oaxaca, Guerrero and Michoacán, reaching 2.11 in (54 mm) at Lake Chapala in a 24-hour period.

=== Hurricane Beatriz ===
- Category 1 hurricane (SSHWS)
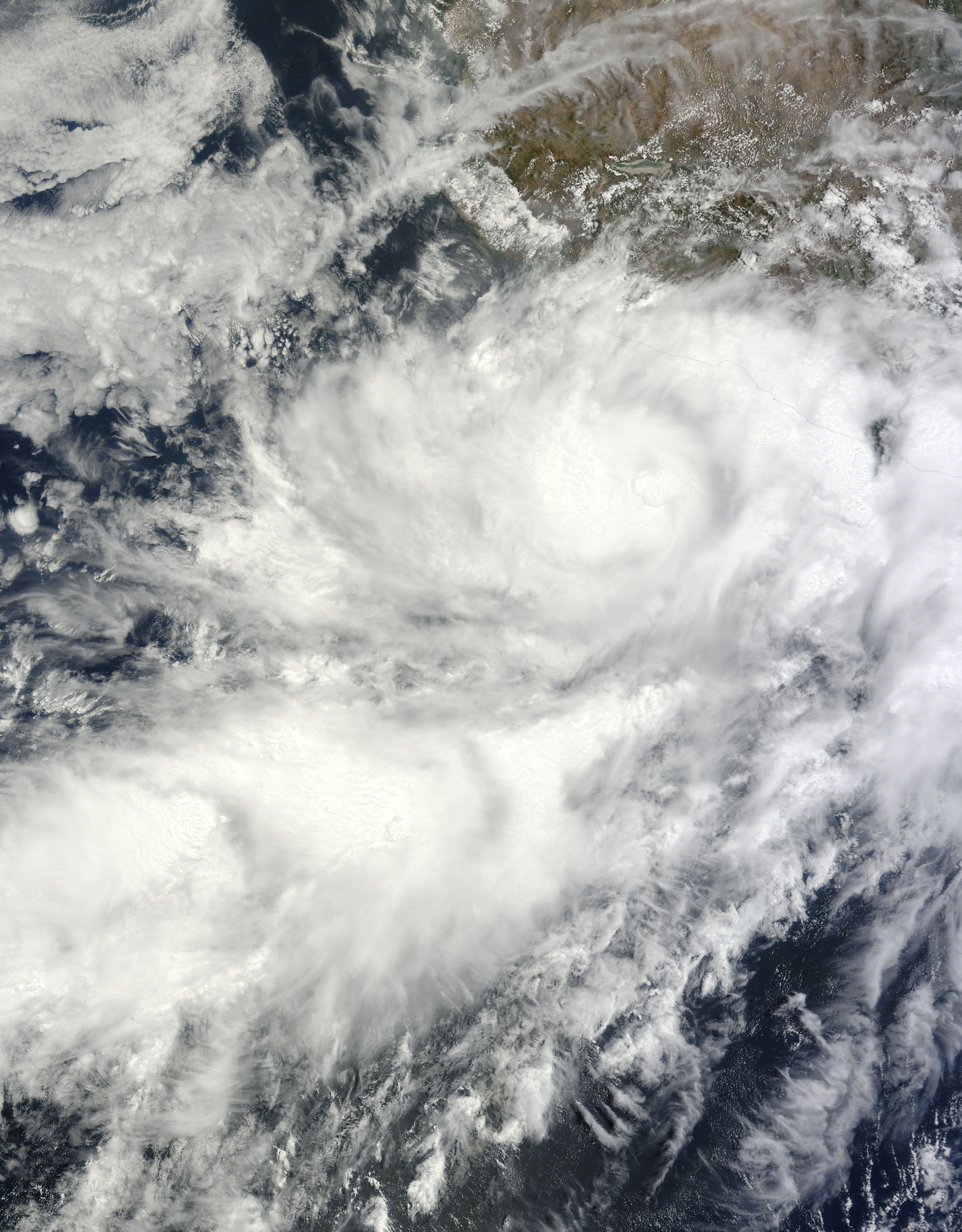
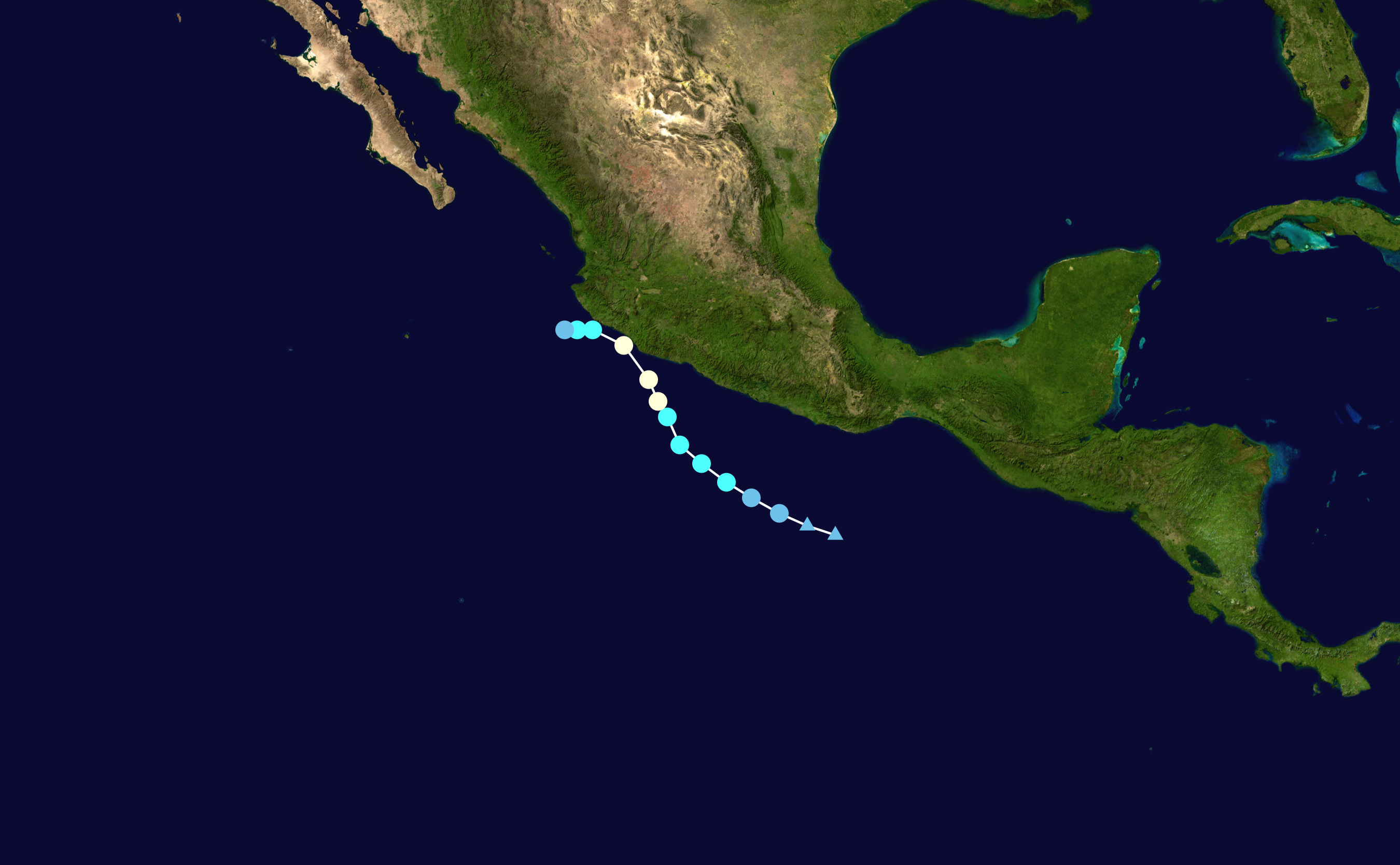
- Duration: June 19 – June 22
- Peak intensity: 90 mph (150 km/h) (1-min); 977 mbar (hPa)

A tropical wave exited western Africa on June 4 and reached the western Caribbean Sea ten days later. On June 15, the wave entered the eastern Pacific, and a day later, another tropical wave entered the eastern Pacific. The two waves interacted to produce an elongated low-pressure area on June 17 off the southern coast of Mexico. Convection increased and organized as a circulation became better defined. At 06:00 UTC on June 19, the system developed into Tropical Depression Two-E while located about 345 mi (555 km) south-southeast of Acapulco. A ridge over the northwest Caribbean steered the depression to the northwest over an area of warm waters and low wind shear. Late on June 19, the depression strengthened into Tropical Storm Beatriz. The convection organized and evolved into a CDO, Late on June 20, Beatriz attained hurricane status while located about 205 mi (335 km) southeast of Manzanillo, as recorded by the Hurricane Hunters. Around that time, the hurricane turned to the north-northwest due to a weakness in the ridge, bringing it closer to the coast. Around 06:00 UTC on June 21, Beatriz attained peak winds of 90 mph (150 km/h), with a minimum pressure of 977 mbar (28.9 inHg), based on satellite imagery. Shortly thereafter, Beatriz passed within 17 mi (28 km) of the Mexican coast near Manzanillo. (Note: The NHC also noted the possibility of the circulation briefly moving over land, although there was no direct evidence of landfall.) Shortly thereafter, the hurricane rapidly weakened due to its interaction with Mexico's mountainous terrain, dropping to tropical storm status six hours after peaking. At 00:00 UTC on June 22, Beatriz weakened to a tropical depression, and the circulation dissipated shortly thereafter.

While passing near southwest Mexico, Beatriz dropped heavy rainfall, peaking at 46.89 in (1,191.0 mm) at a station in Guerrero called Cayaquitos Protección Civil. The rains caused flooding that killed four people, including a family of three near Acapulco. Floods swept away four vehicles in Acapulco. Farther east in Oaxaca, the rains caused a landslide that blocked parts of the road between Santiago Laollaga and Santa María Guienagati. Heavy rains from Beatriz caused the Sabana River to overflow its banks, placing 150 homes across 14 colonias under water. The NHC estimated that Beatriz produced hurricane conditions over a small portion of the coast; however, no land stations recorded tropical storm-force winds. High waves also affected the coast from Guerrero to Jalisco.

=== Hurricane Calvin ===
- Category 1 hurricane (SSHWS)
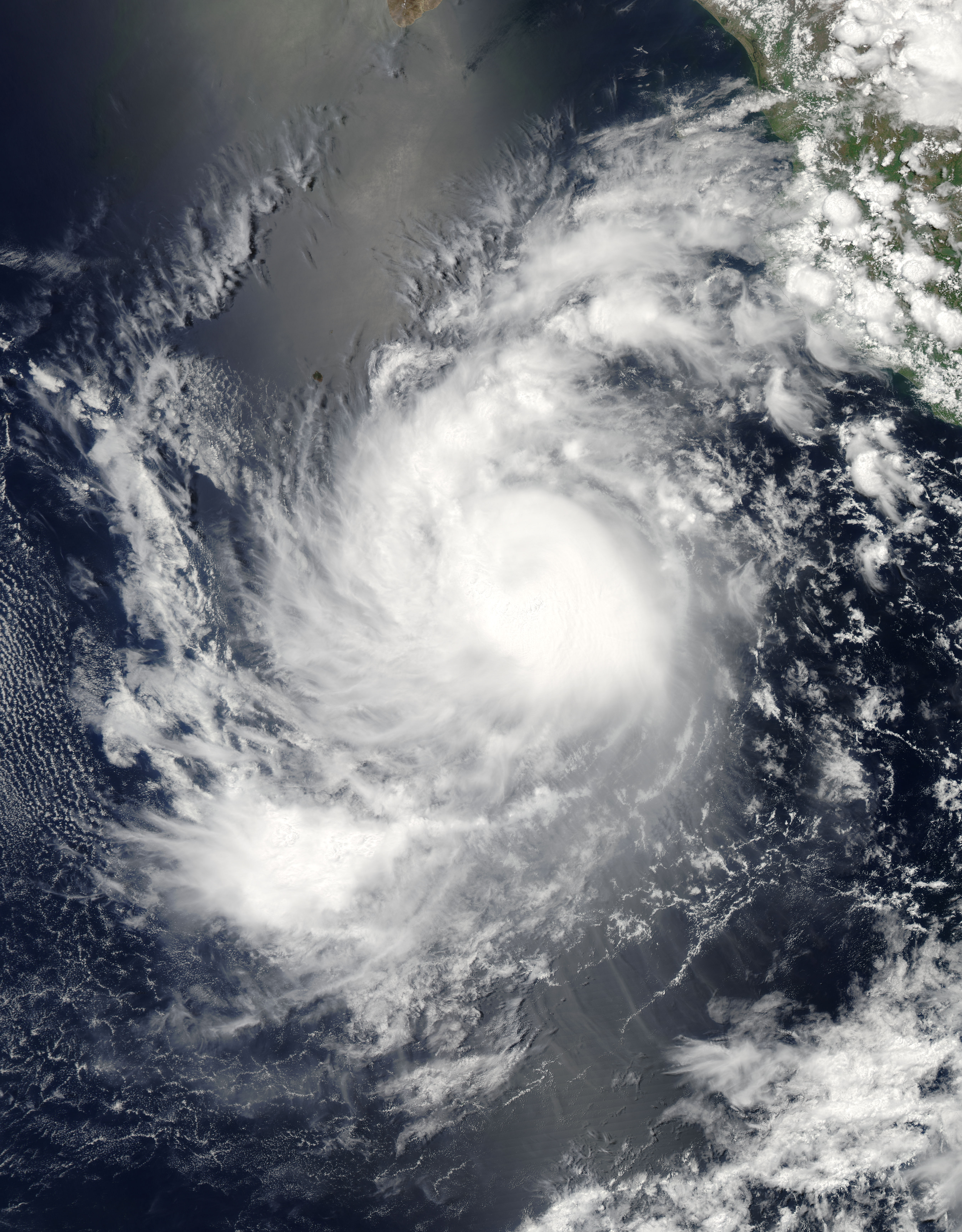
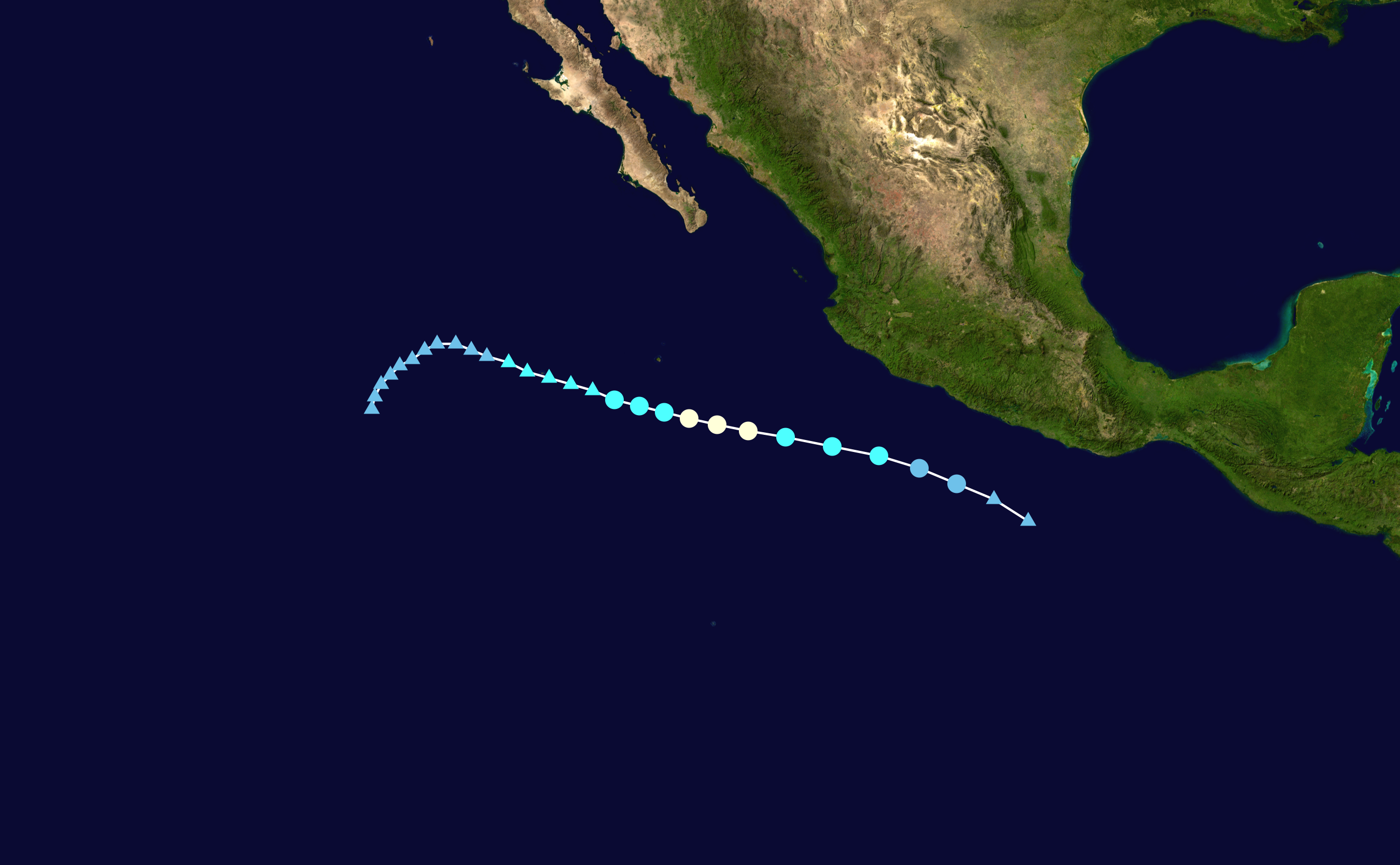
- Duration: July 7 – July 10
- Peak intensity: 80 mph (130 km/h) (1-min); 984 mbar (hPa)

A tropical wave exited western Africa on June 24, which reached Central America on July 3. Two days later, the wave merged with a low-pressure area in the east Pacific Intertropical Convergence Zone (ITCZ) in the Gulf of Tehuantepec. Convection increased and organized as the system continued to the west-northwest. On July 7, it developed into Tropical Depression Three-E about 175 mi (280 km) southwest of Acapulco. While parallelling the Mexican coastline offshore, the depression continued to organize amid moderate wind shear. It strengthened into Tropical Storm Calvin at 00:00 UTC on July 8. Around that time, the wind shear dropped and the storm moved farther away from Mexico. About 18 hours after becoming a tropical storm, Calvin attained hurricane status, as it developed a well-defined mid-level eye. At 00:00 UTC on July 9, Calvin reached peak winds of 80 mph (130 km/h), with a minimum pressure of 984 mbar (29.1 inHg). About 12 hours later, Calvin weakened back into a tropical storm due to cooler waters. On July 10, it degenerated into a remnant low after it lost its convection while still maintaining tropical storm-force winds. That day, the remnants of Calvin passed over Clarion Island, which recorded wind gusts of 45 mph (72 km/h). On July 11, the winds dropped below tropical-storm force. The remnants continued to the west-northwest before turning to the southwest on July 13. The circulation dissipated a day later while located about 775 mi (1,250 km) southwest of Cabo San Lucas.

=== Hurricane Dora ===
- Category 4 hurricane (SSHWS)
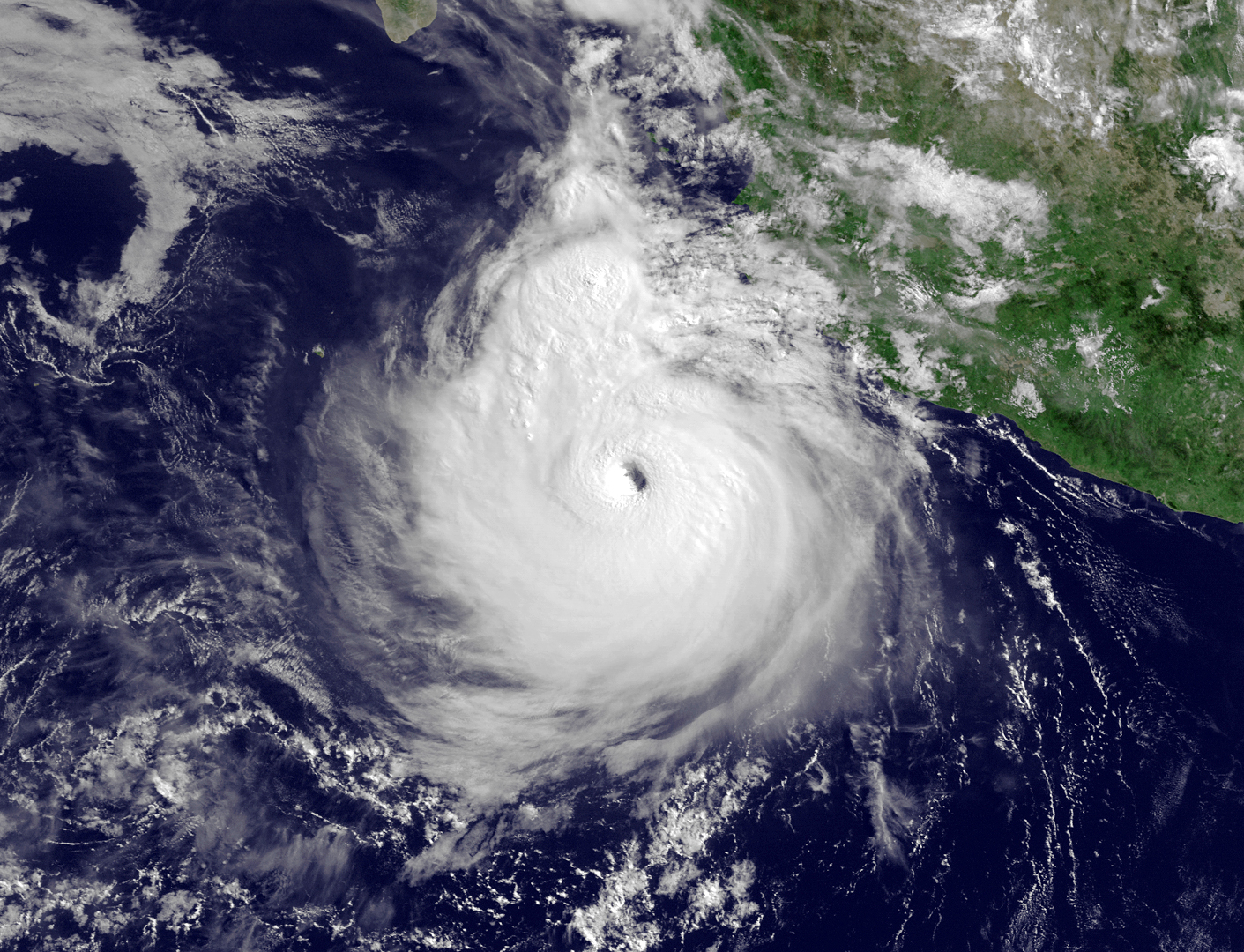
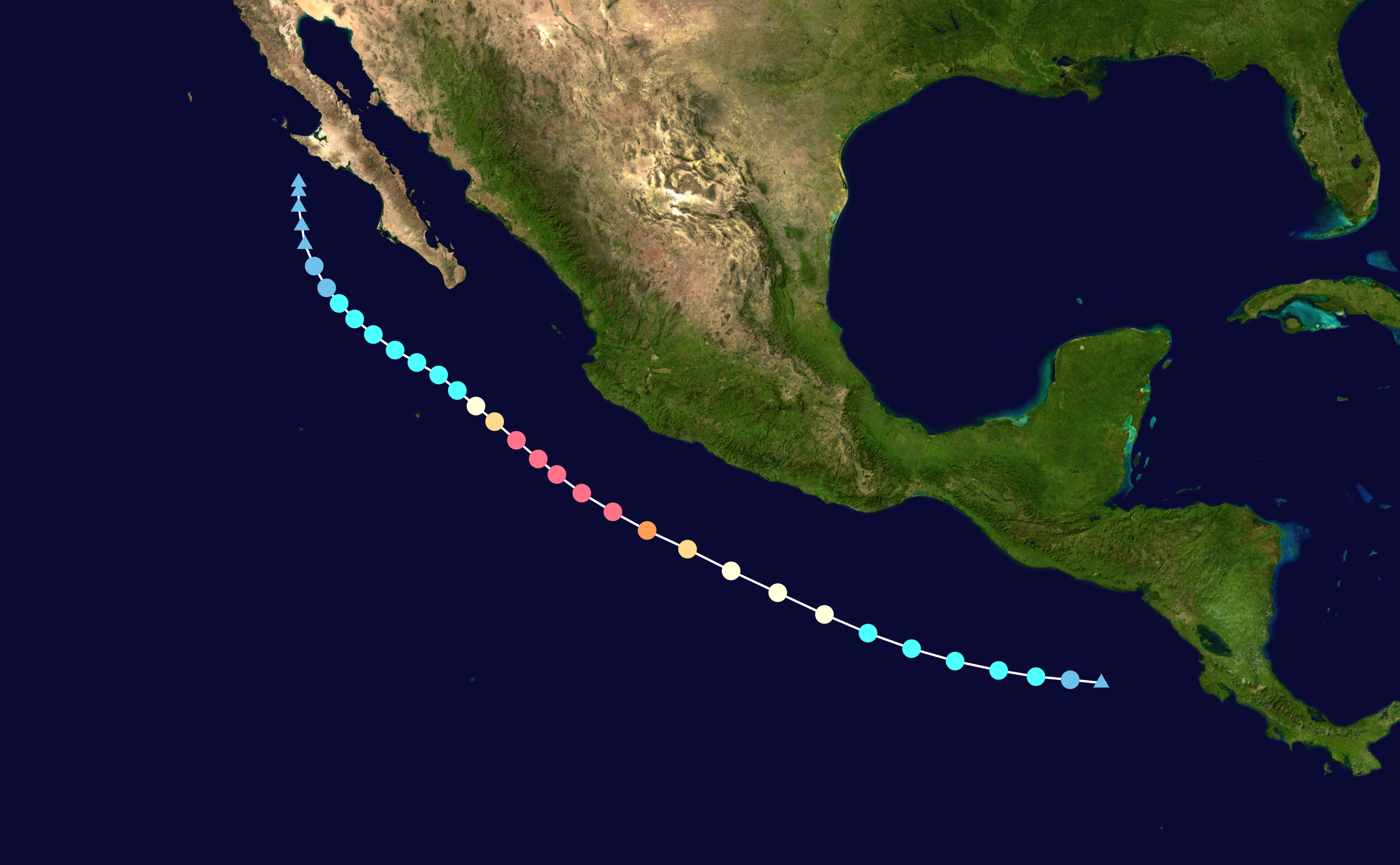
- Duration: July 18 – July 24
- Peak intensity: 155 mph (250 km/h) (1-min); 929 mbar (hPa)

A tropical wave exited western Africa on July 7, which reached the southwest Caribbean Sea a week later. It interacted with an area of strong southwesterly flow to produce a low-pressure area on July 15. The low moved westward into the eastern Pacific two days later, where it continued to organize. At 06:00 UTC on July 18, the low developed into Tropical Depression Four-E about 230 mi (600 km) southwest of El Salvador. With warm waters and a favorable environment, the depression quickly strengthened into Tropical Storm Dora. Steered by a ridge to its north, it moved to the west-northwest, parallel to Mexico's southern coast. Late on July 19, Dora attained hurricane status, and it subsequently developed a well-defined eye while rapidly intensifying. Late on July 20, Dora strengthened into a major hurricane. At 12:00 UTC on the next day, it reached peak winds of 155 mph (250 km/h), with a minimum pressure of 929 mbar (27.4 inHg); this was based on estimates from satellite imagery. It was located about 200 mi (325 km) southwest of Manzanillo. NHC forecaster Eric Blake described Dora on satellite imagery as "rather spectacular with mesovirtices noted within the distinct eye." Soon after peaking, the hurricane turned northwestward while rounding the southwestern periphery of a ridge. Stronger wind shear and cooler waters caused Dora to weaken rapidly. It fell to a tropical storm late on July 22, and to a tropical depression on July 24. At 00:00 UTC on July 25, Dora degenerated into a remnant low after losing its convection. The circulation turned northward and dissipated on July 26 just off the western coast of the Baja California peninsula.

The precursor to Dora dropped heavy rainfall in Guatemala and southeast Mexico, producing flash floods and landslides that killed five people. Several rivers and streams overflowed, leaving about 200,000 people homeless after nearly 40,000 homes were affected. The government of Mexico issued a tropical storm watch from Lázaro Cárdenas to Cabo Corrientes, and later a tropical storm warning for the southern Baja California peninsula from Agua Blanca to Buenavista. In Guerrero, high waves wrecked a small lighthouse and damaged about 60 restaurants along the beach.

=== Hurricane Eugene ===
- Category 4 hurricane (SSHWS)
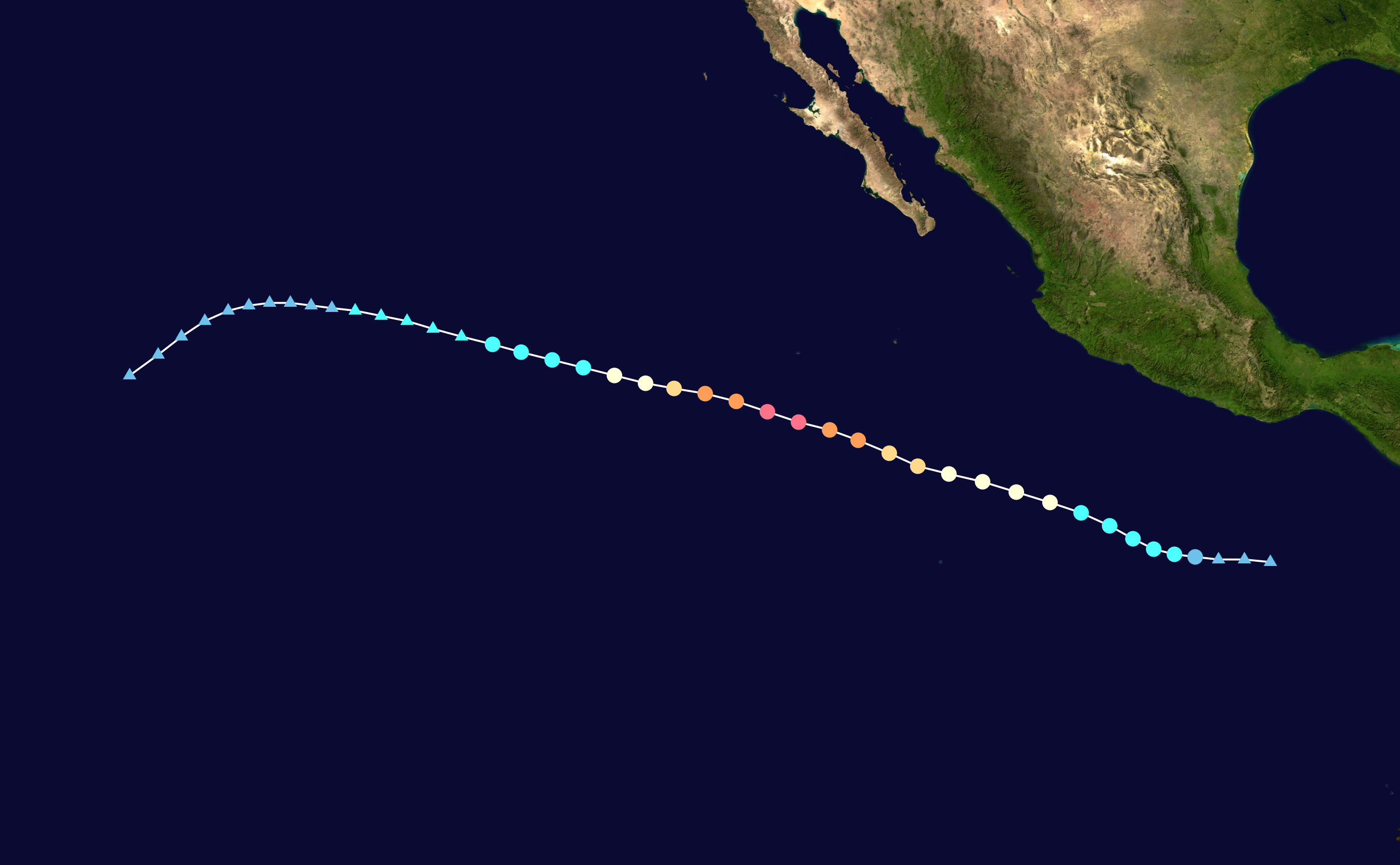
- Duration: July 31 – August 6
- Peak intensity: 140 mph (220 km/h) (1-min); 942 mbar (hPa)

A tropical wave exited western Africa on July 16, which contributed to the formation of Atlantic Tropical Storm Don. The southern portion of the wave continued westward, which reached the eastern Pacific around July 25. A circulation developed two days later off the southern coast of Guatemala. Wind shear prevented immediate development, until the system produced sustained convection beginning on July 30. At 06:00 UTC, it developed into Tropical Depression Five-E while located about 435 mi (705 km) south of Acapulco. Within six hours, the depression strengthened into Tropical Storm Eugene. The storm moved to the west-northwest, steered by a ridge over Mexico. Eugene attained hurricane status on August 1, around which time it developed an eye. Ragged at first, the small eye gradually became larger and better defined. On August 3, Eugene became a major hurricane. At 21:00 UTC that day, it reached peak winds of 140 mph (220 km/h), with a minimum pressure of 942 mbar (27.8 inHg), based on estimated from satellite imagery. This made Eugene a Category 4 hurricane, and it briefly had the structure of an annular hurricane. Cooler waters caused Eugene to weaken on August 4, and it dropped to tropical storm status the next day. After losing all of its convection, Eugene degenerated into a remnant low on August 6, which continued producing gale-force winds for another day. The remnant low turned southwestward on August 8. It degenerated into a trough on August 10, located about 980 mi (1,575 km) east of Hilo, Hawaii.

=== Tropical Storm Fernanda ===
- Tropical storm (SSHWS)
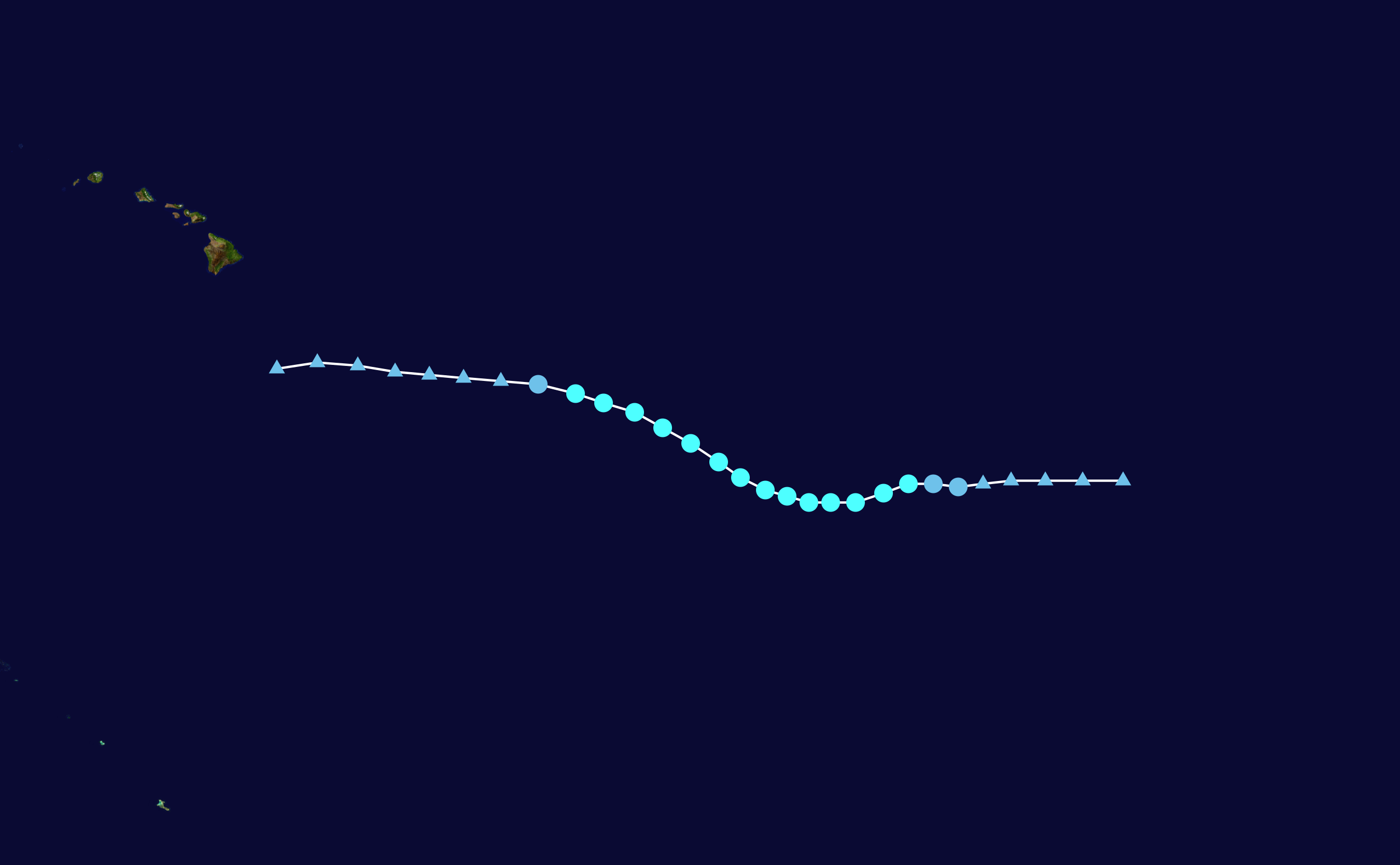
- Duration: August 15 – August 20
- Peak intensity: 70 mph (110 km/h) (1-min); 992 mbar (hPa)

A tropical wave exited western Africa on July 25, spawning Atlantic Tropical Storm Emily. The remainder of the wave continued westward, reaching the eastern Pacific on August 6. It continued westward, producing intermittent thunderstorms. On August 13, the system had a surface circulation, and the thunderstorms subsequently became more organized. On August 15, it developed into Tropical Depression Six-E about 1,610 mi (2,590 km) east-southeast of Hawaii. On the next day, it strengthened into Tropical Storm Fernanda. Initially, wind shear displaced the convection west of the center; however, the shear soon dropped, and the thunderstorms organized into rainbands. Fernanda continued generally westward, steered by a ridge to its north, as it strengthened. On August 17, the storm reached peak winds of 70 mph (110 km/h), with a minimum pressure of 992 mbar (29.3 inHg), as estimated by satellite imagery. At its peak, Fernanda had an eye-like feature. It soon crossed into the central Pacific, encountering wind shear and dry, stable air, which caused weakening. Late on August 19, Fernanda weakened into a tropical depression, and it degenerated into a remnant low on the next day after it lost its convection. The low continued to the west-northwest, dissipating on August 21 to the south of Hawaii. The remnants of Fernanda dropped light rainfall in Hawaii, reaching around 1.5 in (38 mm) in Hana on Maui.

=== Hurricane Greg ===
- Category 1 hurricane (SSHWS)
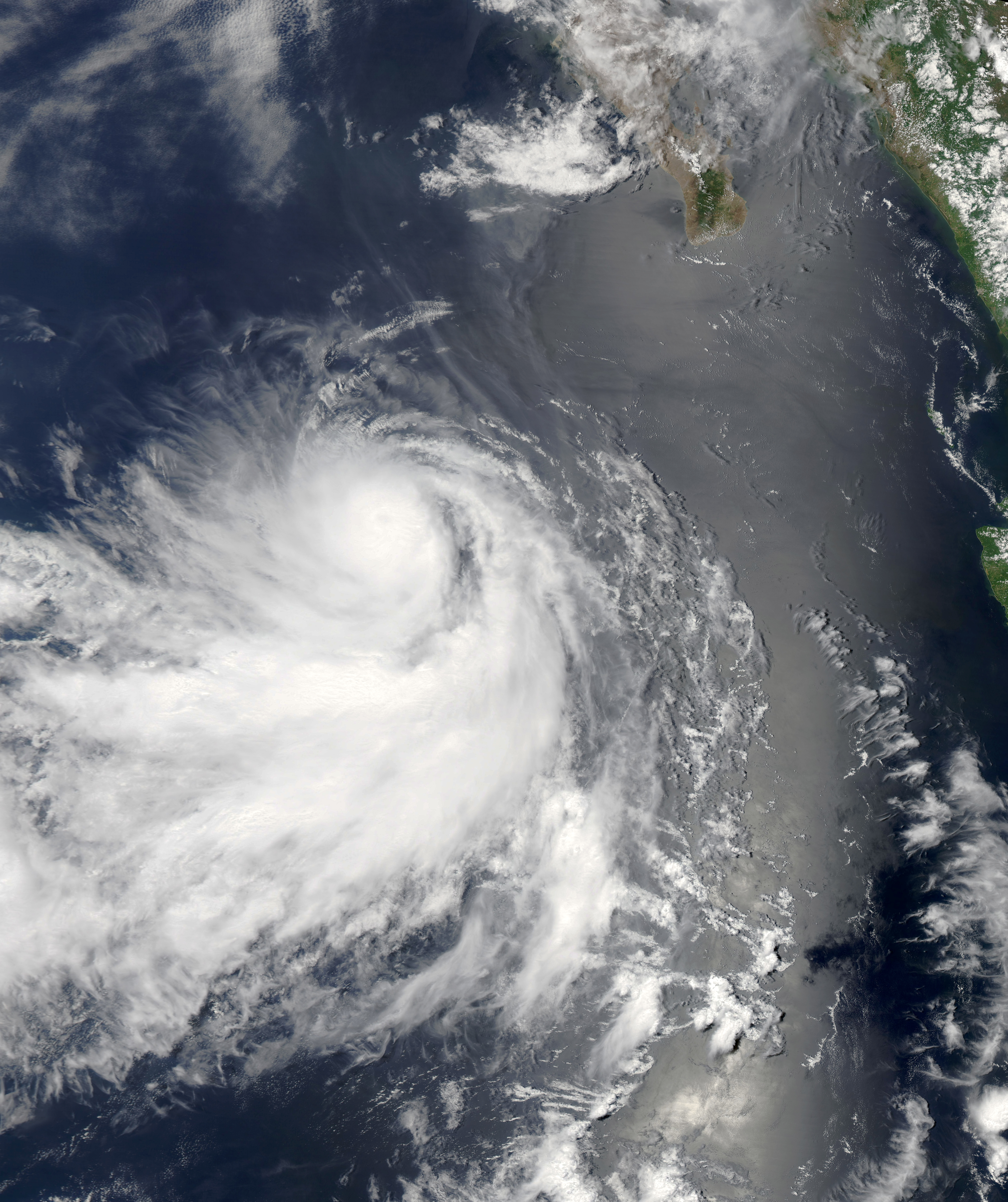
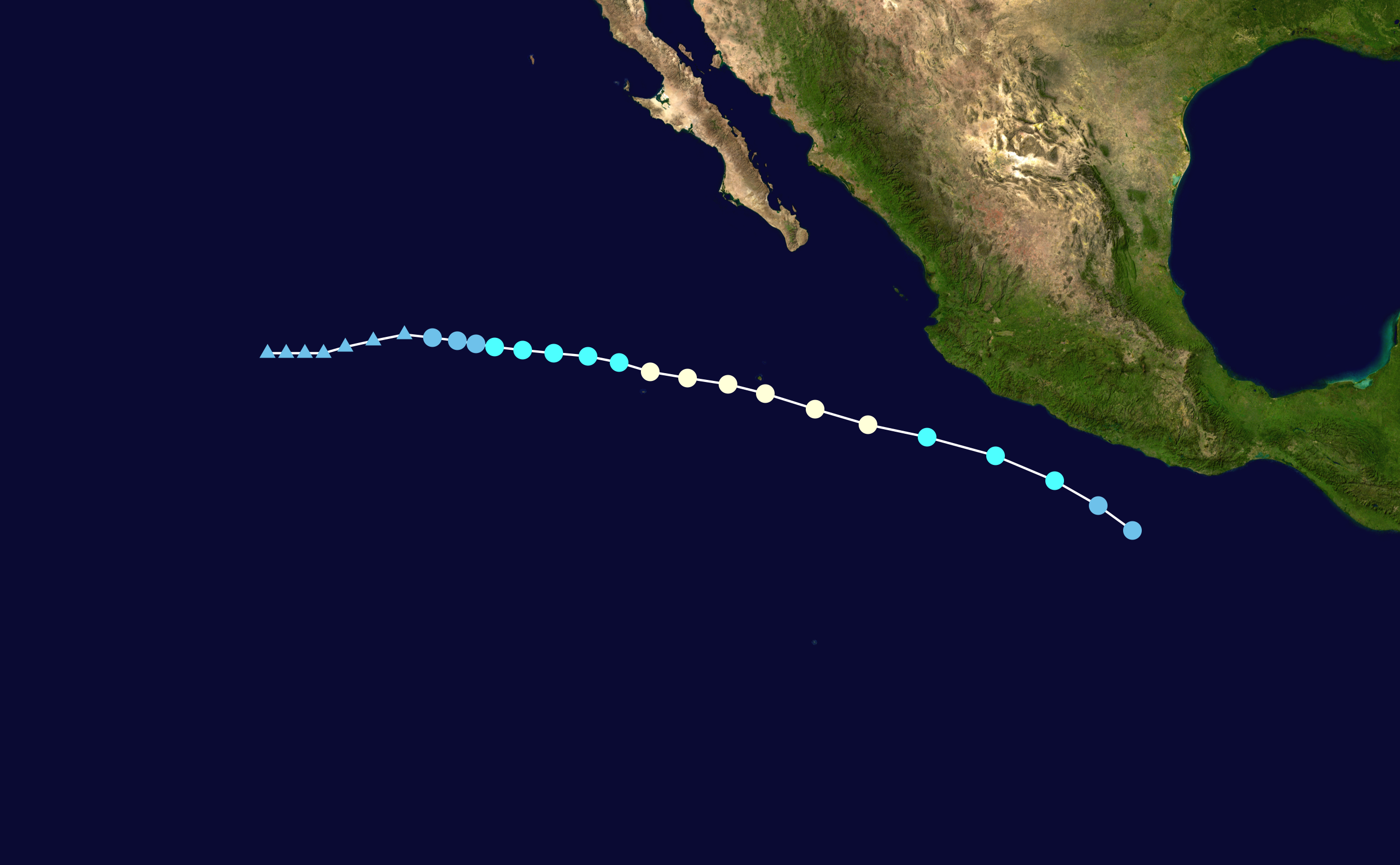
- Duration: August 16 – August 21
- Peak intensity: 85 mph (140 km/h) (1-min); 979 mbar (hPa)

A tropical wave exited western Africa on August 3, which moved westward across the Atlantic without development. It crossed Central America into the eastern Pacific on August 14, where it developed a low-pressure area south of the Gulf of Tehuantepec. Late on August 16, the system developed into Tropical Depression Seven-E, while located about 175 mi (280 km) south-southeast of Acapulco. On August 17, the NHC upgraded it to Tropical Storm Greg. The storm continued to the west-northwest, parallel to Mexico's southern coast, due to a ridge to its north. On August 18, Greg attained hurricane status, as an eye developed within a central dense overcast. At 12:00 UTC that day, Greg reached peak winds of 85 mph (130 km/h), with a minimum pressure of 979 mbar (28.9 inHg), as estimated by satellite imagery. After maintaining peak winds for 12&nbsphours, the hurricane began weakening due to cooler waters and a less favorable environment. On August 19, Greg dropped to tropical storm status, and further to a tropical depression on the next day. It degenerated into a remnant low on August 21, which dissipated two days later.

=== Tropical Depression Eight-E ===
- Tropical depression (SSHWS)
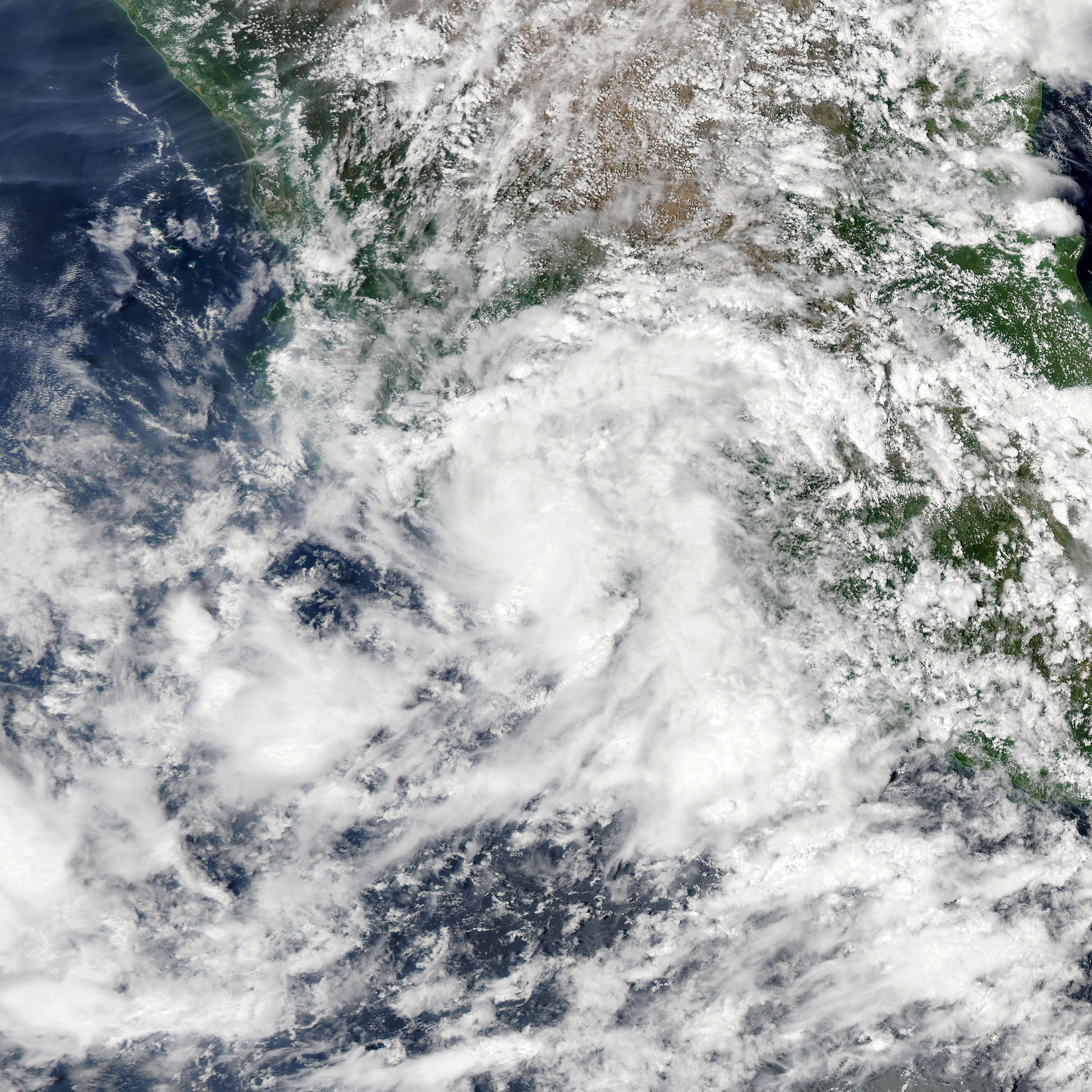
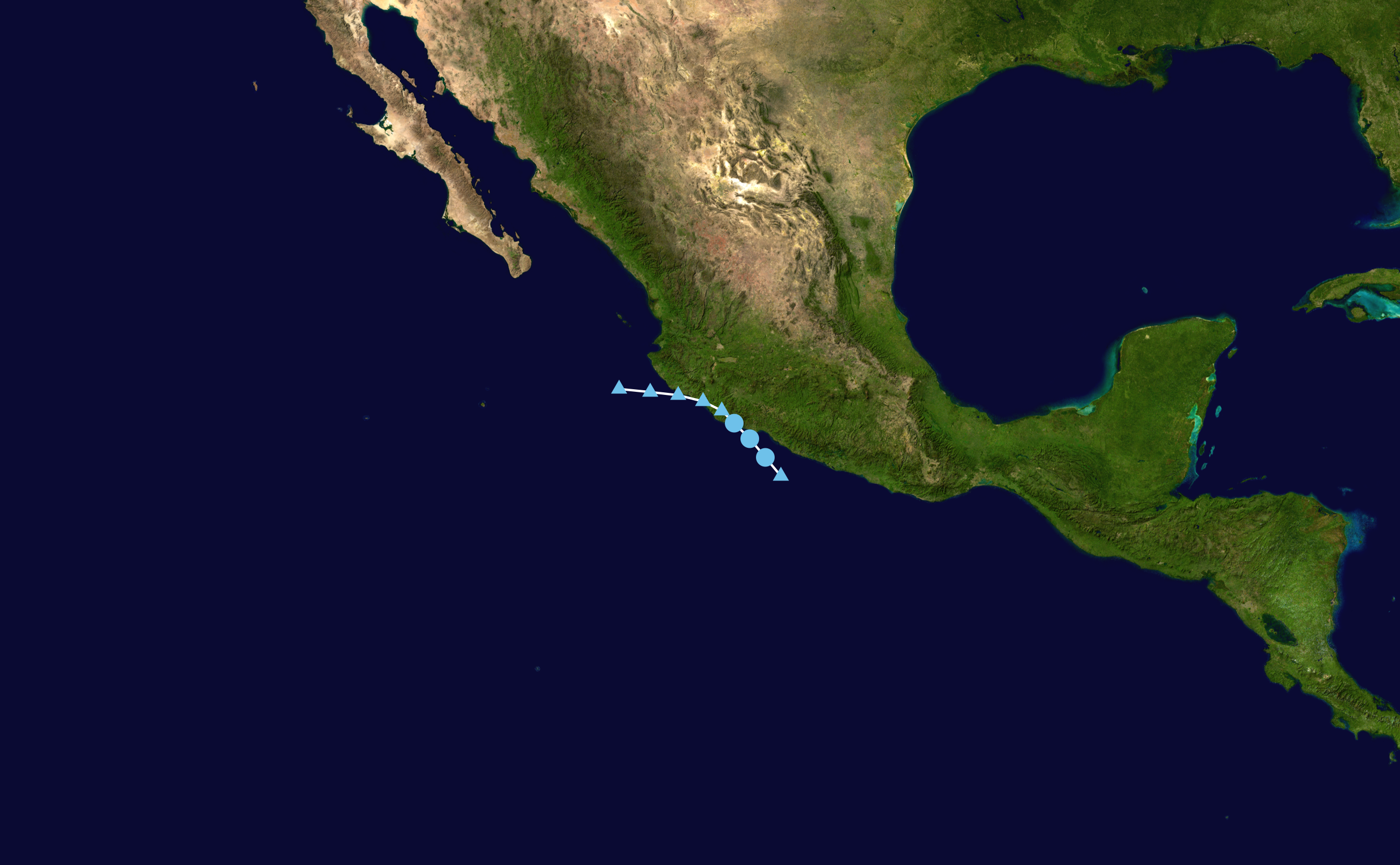
- Duration: August 31 – September 1
- Peak intensity: 35 mph (55 km/h) (1-min); 1002 mbar (hPa)

A tropical wave exited western Africa on August 15. The northern portion of the wave split to become Atlantic Hurricane Irene on August 21. The southern portion of the wave continued westward, reaching the eastern Pacific on August 24. The wave merged with the ITCZ and gradually became better organized off the southern coast of Mexico. At 06:00 UTC on August 31, it developed into Tropical Depression Eight-E, located about 80 mi (130 km) southwest of Zihuatanejo. The depression had winds of 35 mph (55 km/h), and quickly attained its lowest pressure of 1,002 mbar (29.6 inHg). At 17:00 UTC on August 31, the depression moved ashore southwestern Mexico near Lázaro Cárdenas, Michoacán. By 00:00 UTC on September 1, the depression degenerated into a remnant low. The low continued westward and re-emerged over the ocean near Manzanillo, dissipating on September 2.

The depression led to a tropical storm watch from Zihuatanejo westward to Punta San Telmo. It dropped heavy rainfall over Mexico, peaking at 8.82 in (224.0 mm) in Cachán, Michoacán.

=== Hurricane Hilary ===
- Category 4 hurricane (SSHWS)
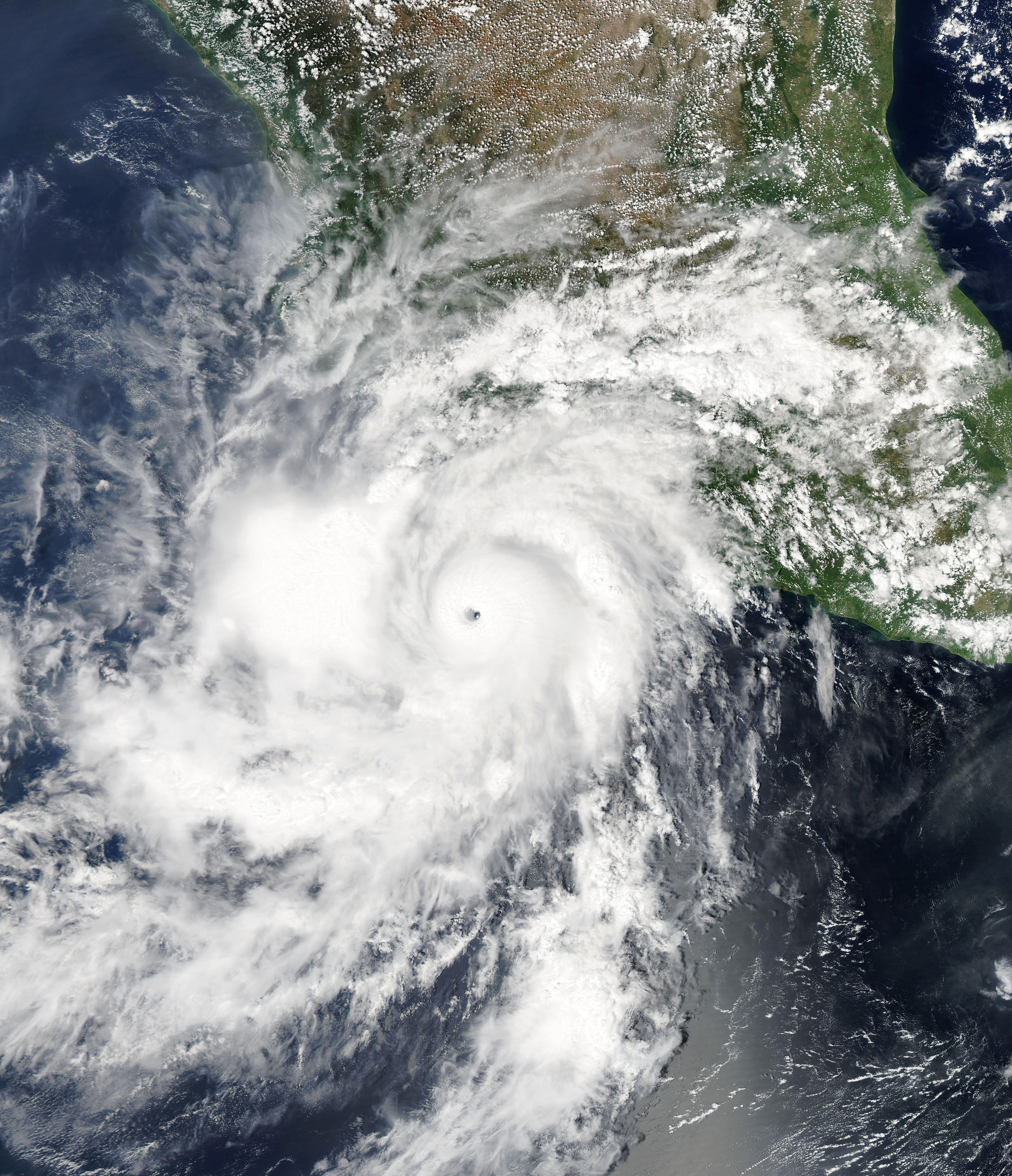
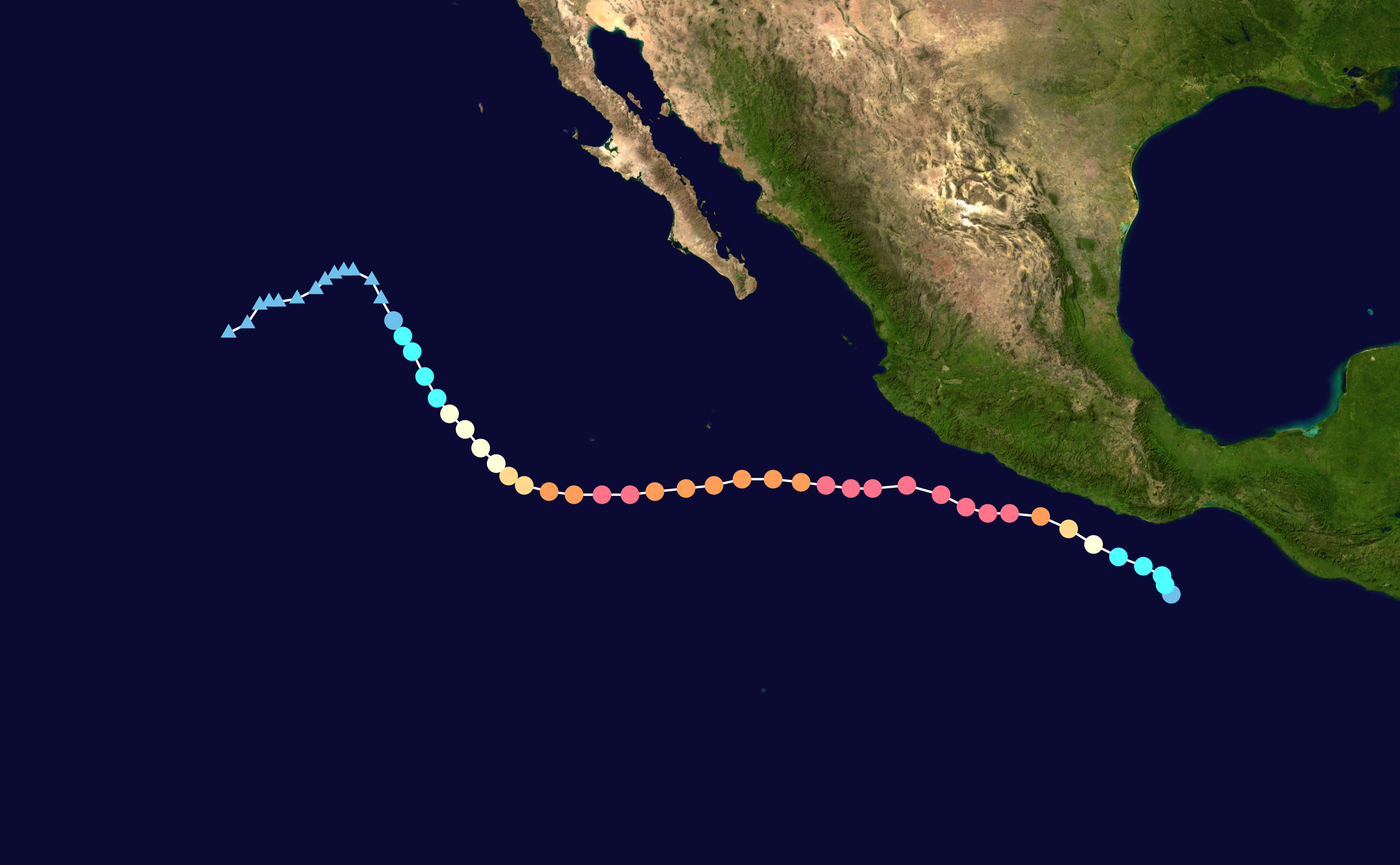
- Duration: September 21 – September 30
- Peak intensity: 145 mph (230 km/h) (1-min); 942 mbar (hPa)

On September 7, a tropical wave exited western Africa. It reached the eastern Pacific ten days later, where it interacted with a monsoon trough and produced a low pressure area on September 18. On September 21, it developed into Tropical Depression Nine-E about 355 mi (575 km) southeast of Acapulco. The depression was located in a favorable area, with warm waters and low wind shear, as it moved west-northwestward. Within six hours of developing, the depression strengthened into Tropical Storm Hilary. It attained hurricane status on September 22, while undergoing rapid deepening. At 18:00 UTC on September 23, Hilary reached peak winds of 145 mph (230 km/h), making it a Category 4 hurricane. Its minimum pressure was estimated at 942 mbar (27.8 inHg), based on satellite imagery. Hilary underwent an eyewall replacement cycle, causing it to fall to Category 3 status on September 25. The hurricane restrengthened to Category 4 intensity on September 26, reaching a secondary peak of 130 mph (215 km/h). Cooler waters and stronger wind shear caused Hilary to weaken on September 27. Hilary's track shifted back to the northwest after an upper-level low eroded the ridge to its north. On September 29, Hilary weakened to tropical storm status. It deteriorated into a remnant low on the next day after the convection dissipated. The low turned back to the southwest, dissipating on October 3 about 1,050 mi (1,690 km) to the west of the southern tip of Baja California.

The government of Mexico issued tropical storm warnings for southwest Mexico from Lagunas de Chacahua to Lázaro Cárdenas. Small craft advisories were put in effect. The port of Acapulco was closed for small vessels. Three fishermen died when their boat sank offshore Marquelia. The hurricane dropped heavy rainfall in Guererro, peaking at 691.0 mm (27.20 in) in Huamuxtitlán. 24-hour rainfall totals in Tabasco reached 218 mm (8.58 in). Also in the state, four rivers overflowed their banks; one river received 51 in (1,300 mm) of excess water in a single day. Low-lying areas, such as grasslands and pastures, experienced major flooding, prompting farmers to evacuate their livestock. In Villahermosa, the downpours resulted in the collapse of water drains, flooding many streets and stranding cars. Across Guerrero, 23,000 residents were advised to evacuated due to rising floodwaters. Offshore Colima, large waves of 9 ft (2.7 m) to 15 ft (4.6 m) high were recorded.

=== Hurricane Jova ===
- Category 3 hurricane (SSHWS)
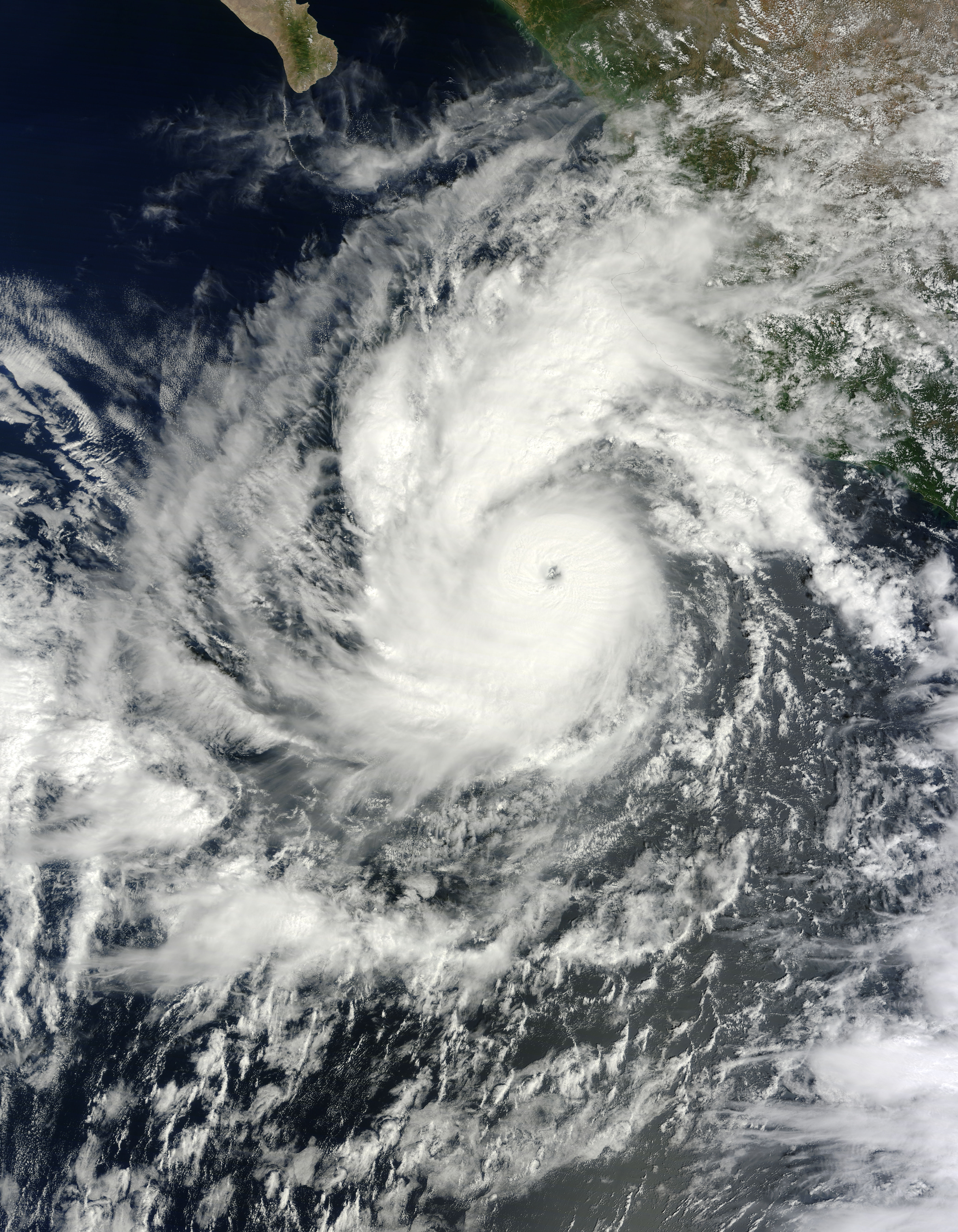
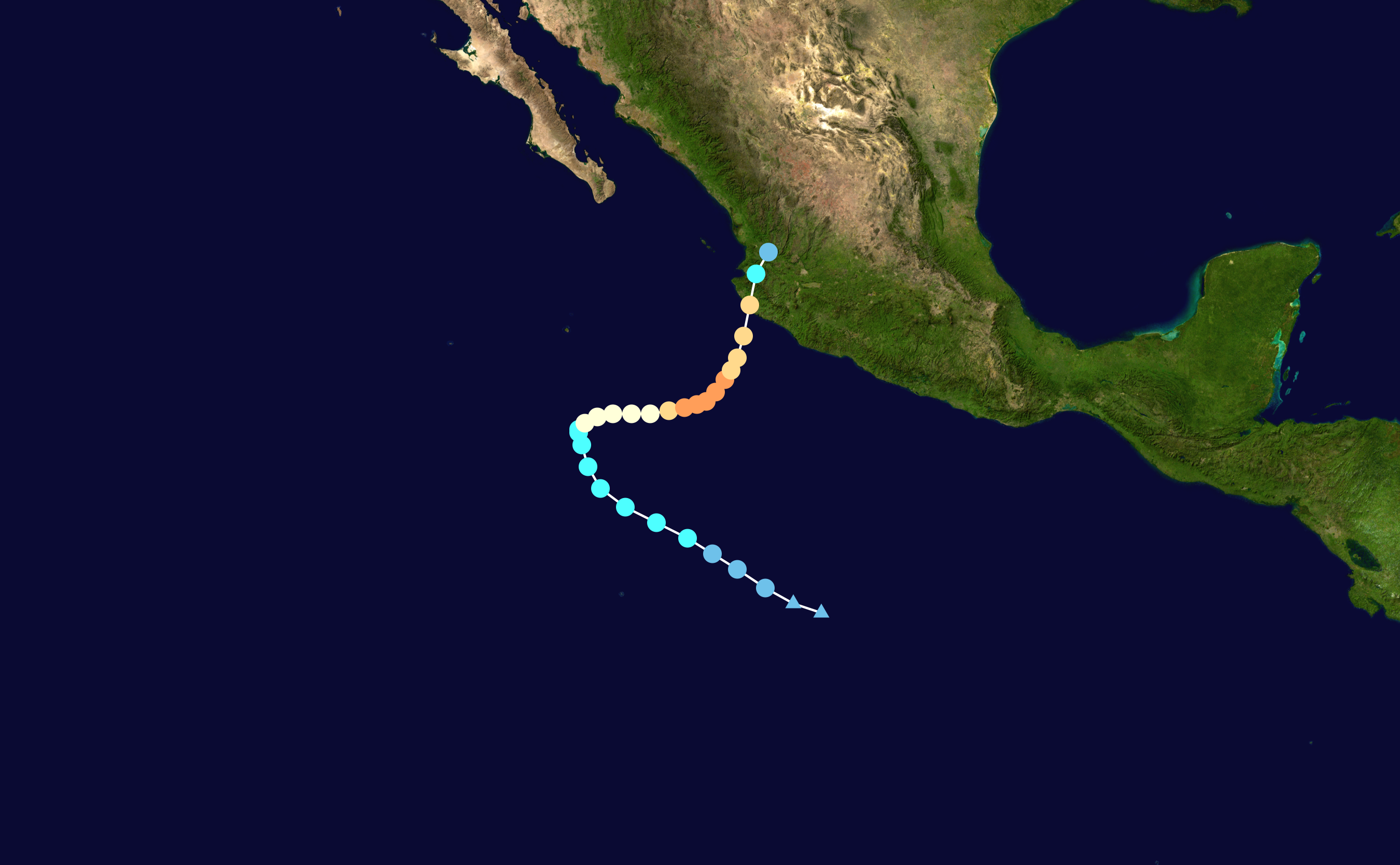
- Duration: October 6 – October 13
- Peak intensity: 125 mph (205 km/h) (1-min); 955 mbar (hPa)

During the late hours of October 4, an area of showers and thunderstorms associated with a broad low-pressure area developed several hundred miles to the south-southwest of Acapulco, Mexico. Moving slowly towards the west, the area of disturbed weather quickly organized. Late on October 5, the National Hurricane Center (NHC) noted that the area had a high chance of developing into a tropical cyclone over the next 48 hours. Just several hours later, the NHC began issuing advisories on Tropical Depression Ten-E, several hundred miles to the south of Manzanillo, Mexico. A more gradual type of development took place after then, and the depression was upgraded into Tropical Storm Jova on the afternoon of October 6. Taking advantage of the favorable environment Jova was embedded within, the storm became a hurricane on October 8, and by October 10, the storm was upgraded to a Category 3 hurricane on the Saffir–Simpson hurricane scale. However, shortly thereafter, the storm began an eyewall replacement cycle and weakened to a lower-end Category 2 hurricane. Several hours after landfall in Mexico, Jova dissipated, very early on October 13.

=== Hurricane Irwin ===
- Category 2 hurricane (SSHWS)
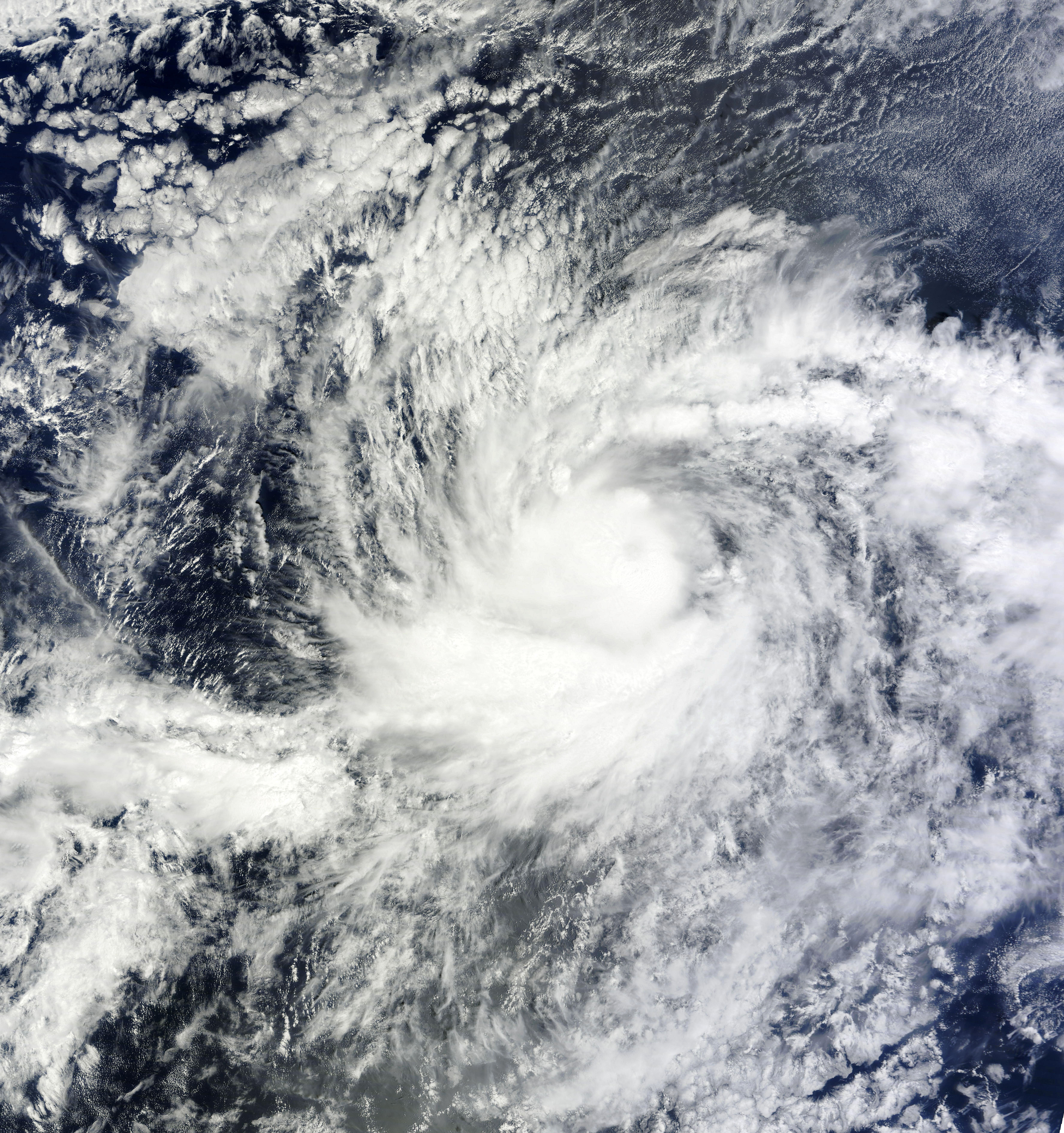
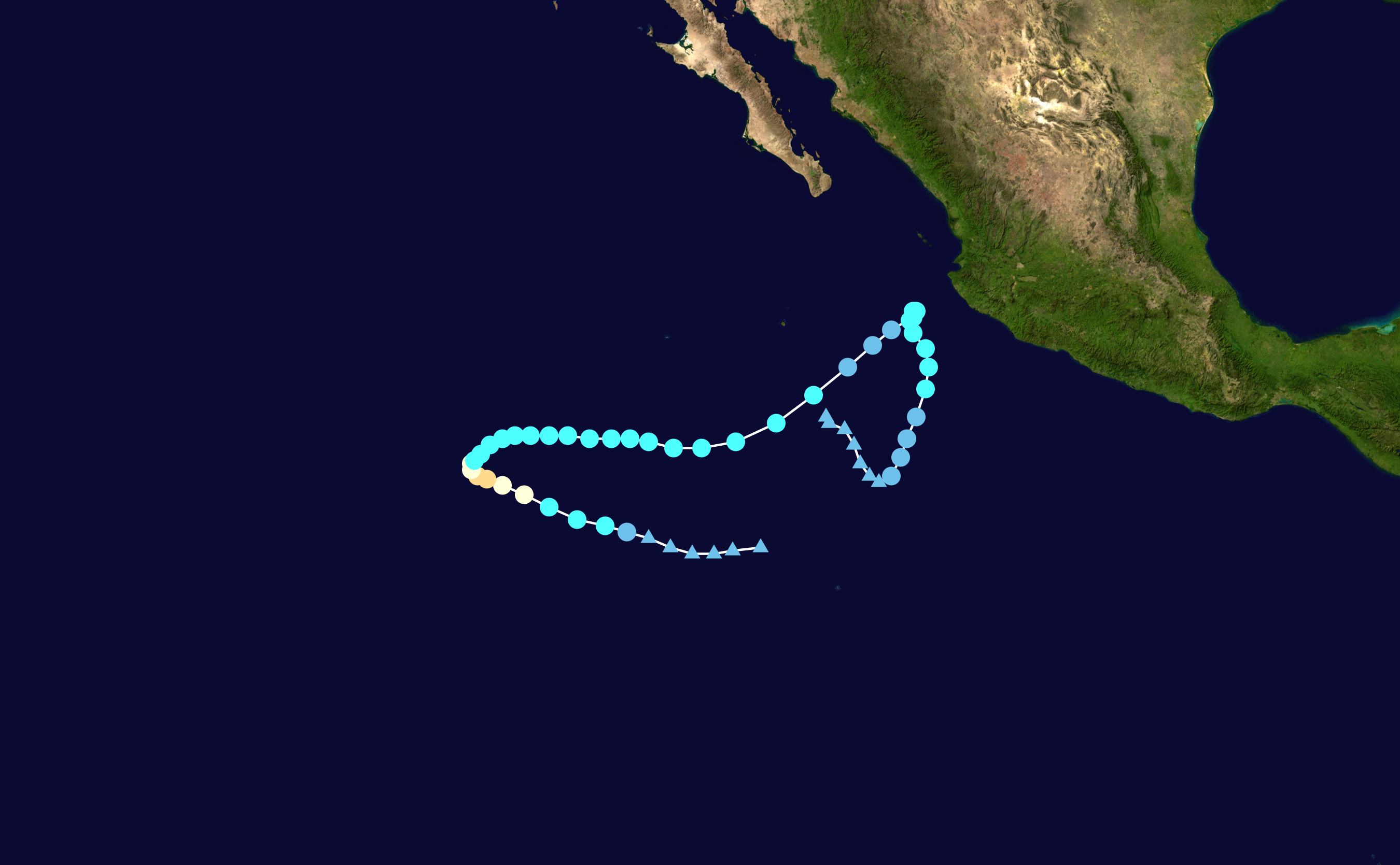
- Duration: October 6 – October 16
- Peak intensity: 100 mph (155 km/h) (1-min); 976 mbar (hPa)

In the beginning of October, the ITCZ had three areas of cyclonic rotation across the eastern Pacific. The eastern portion later became Hurricane Jova, while the central system developed into a low-pressure area on October 3. Following further organization of the convection, the low organized into Tropical Depression Eleven-E at 06:00 UTC on October 6, while located about 845 mi (1,360 km) south of Cabo San Lucas. Six hours later, the depression strengthened into Tropical Storm Irwin. A weak ridge steered Irwin to the west-northwest over an area of warm waters and light wind shear. The storm quickly strengthened and became a hurricane on October 7. At 00:00 UTC on October 8, Irwin attained peak winds of 100 mph (155 km/h), along with a minimum pressure of 976 mbar (28.8 inHg), as estimated by satellite imagery. Around its peak, the hurricane had an eye that was visible on satellite imagery.

Soon after peaking, Irwin slowed and turned to the north, steered by a mid-level trough. Wind shear increased due to the outflow from Hurricane Jova, causing Irwin to weaken to tropical storm status late on October 8. By the next day, it deteriorated into a minimal tropical storm as the thunderstorms dwindled. The circulation turned to an eastward drift, before turning to the northeast. Irwin weakened into a tropical depression on October 13, while located about 310 mi (500 km) west-southwest of Manzanillo. Later that day, the thunderstorms increased, and Irwin restrengthened into a tropical storm. The circulation stalled off Mexico's west coast, during which time Irwin's winds increased slightly to 45 mph (75 km/h). The storm weakened into a tropical depression again late on October 15 as it began drifting southward, steered by a ridge over northwest Mexico. Irwin degenerated into a remnant low on October 16, after losing its thunderstorms. The remnants turned back to the northwest, dissipating late on October 18.

=== Tropical Depression Twelve-E ===
- Tropical depression (SSHWS)
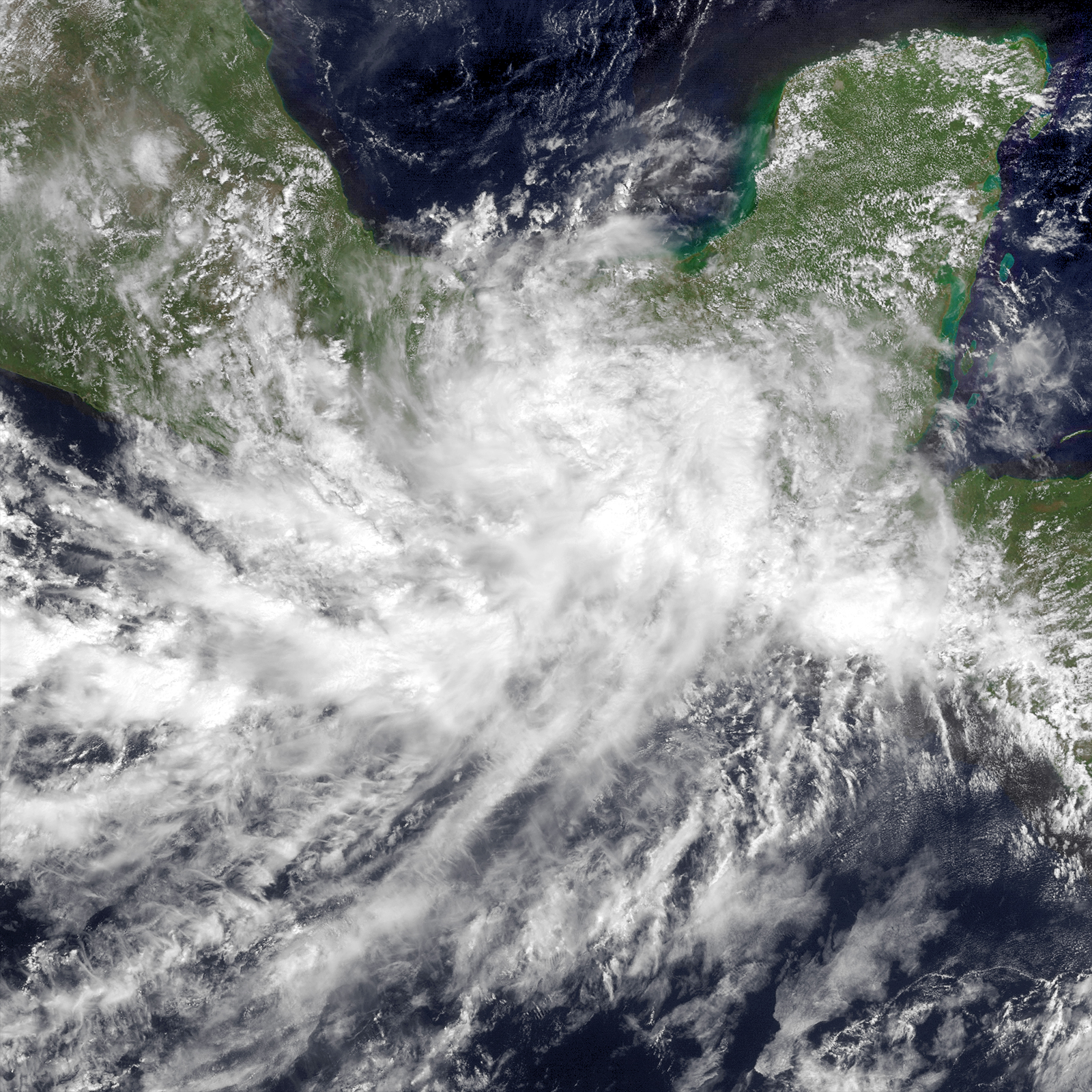
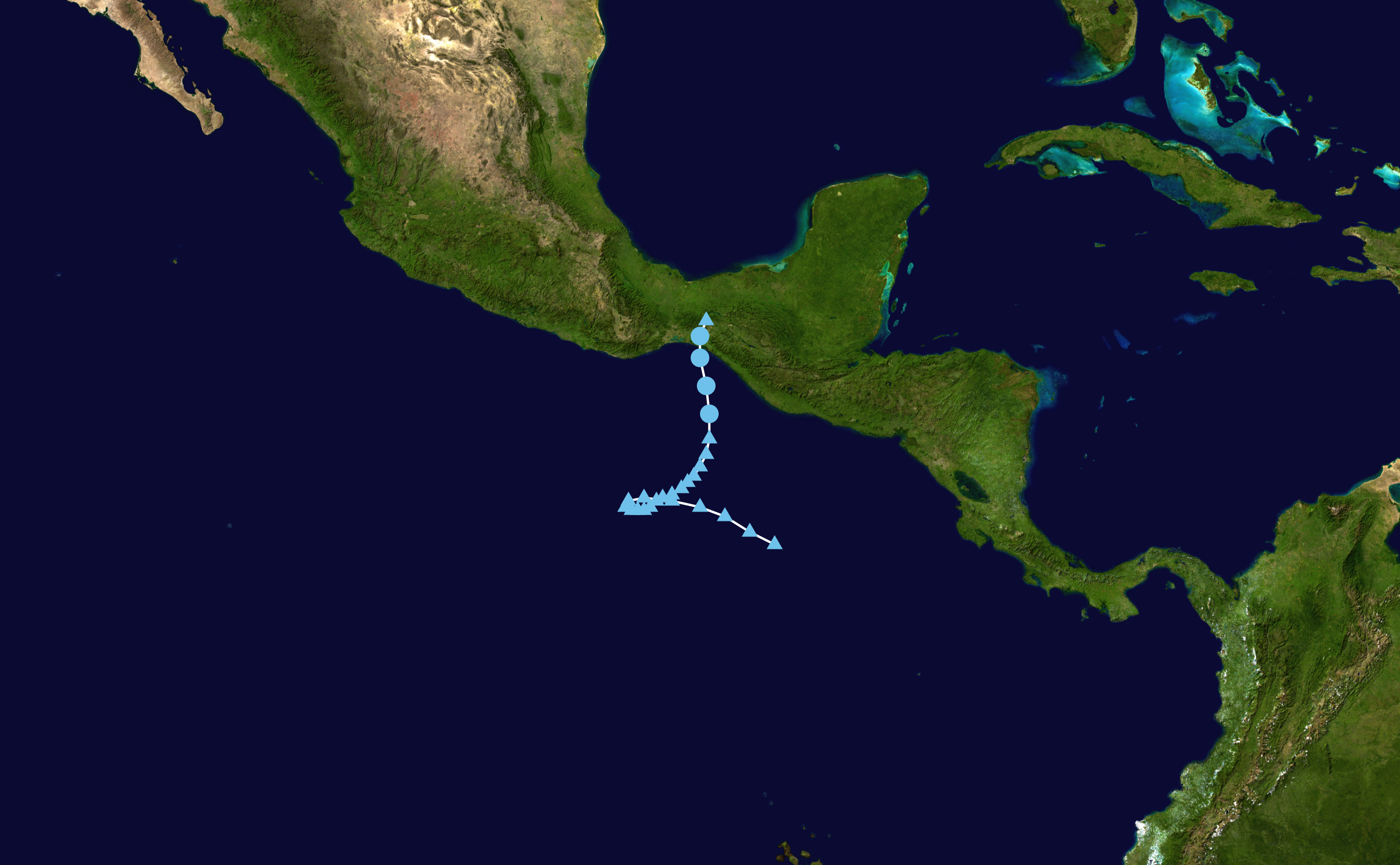
- Duration: October 12 – October 12
- Peak intensity: 35 mph (55 km/h) (1-min); 1004 mbar (hPa)

A tropical wave, the same that spawned Hurricane Phillipe in the Atlantic, crossed Central America into the East Pacific on October 5, during a significant pulse of the MJO. In this favorable environment, the wave generated a low-pressure area in the ITCZ by 18:00 UTC on October 6. Despite initially being hindered by the development of easterly wind shear, the low produced sustain deep convection late on October 11, and organized sufficiently to become Tropical Depression Twelve-E by 00:00 UTC on October 12. The depression moved northward without strengthening and made landfall at 16:00 UTC that day near Paredón, Mexico. The depression rapidly weakened to a remnant low eight hours later and dissipated completely early the next day.

The depression brought torrential rains that caused severe flooding in southeast Mexico and neighboring Guatemala. Up to 12 inches (300 mm) of rain fell in Guatemala, though not all of it may be because of Twelve-E. 36 deaths were directly attributed to the depression by the government of Guatemala. Numerous additional fatalities resulted in Central America from the pulse of the MJO that helped spawn the depression.

=== Hurricane Kenneth ===
- Category 4 hurricane (SSHWS)
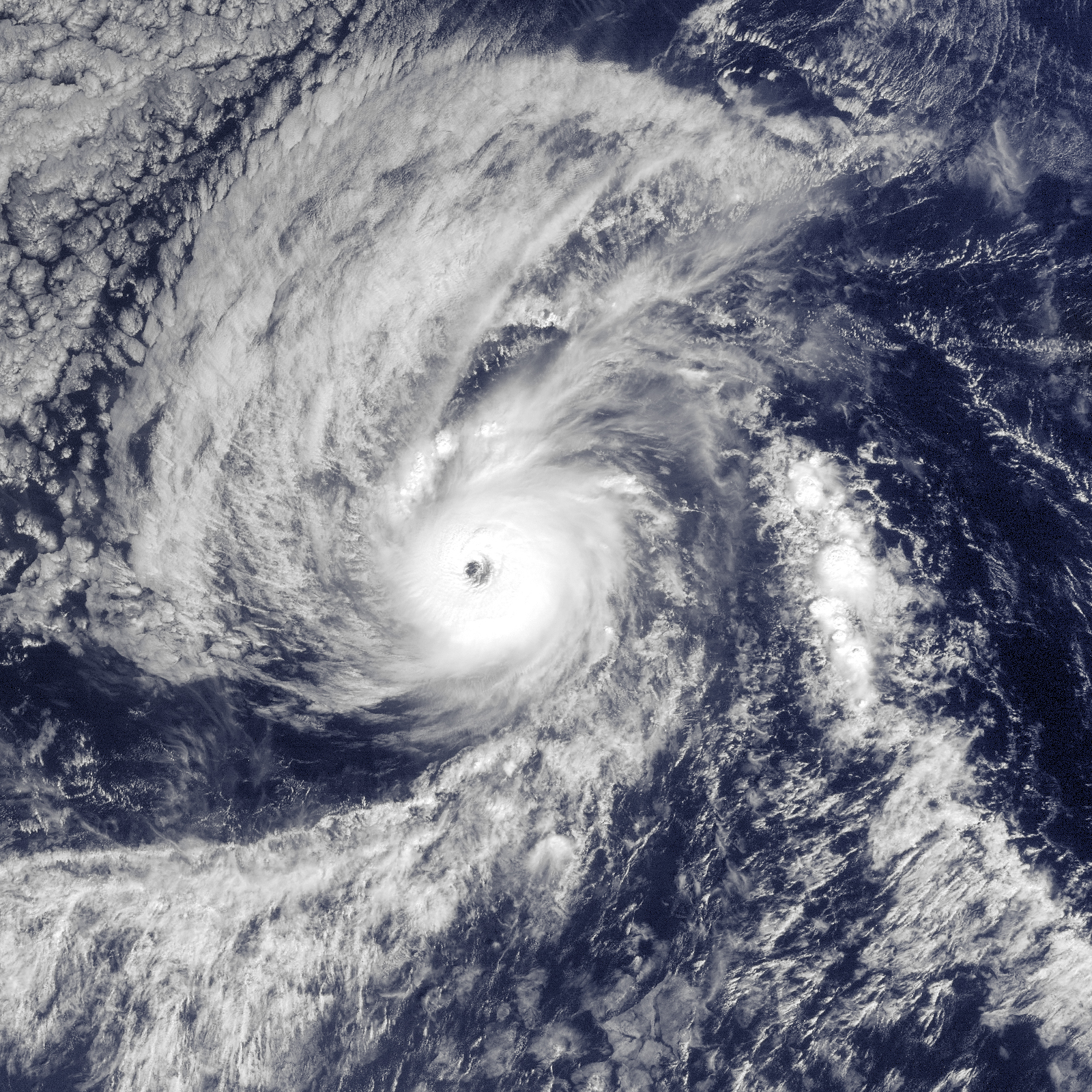
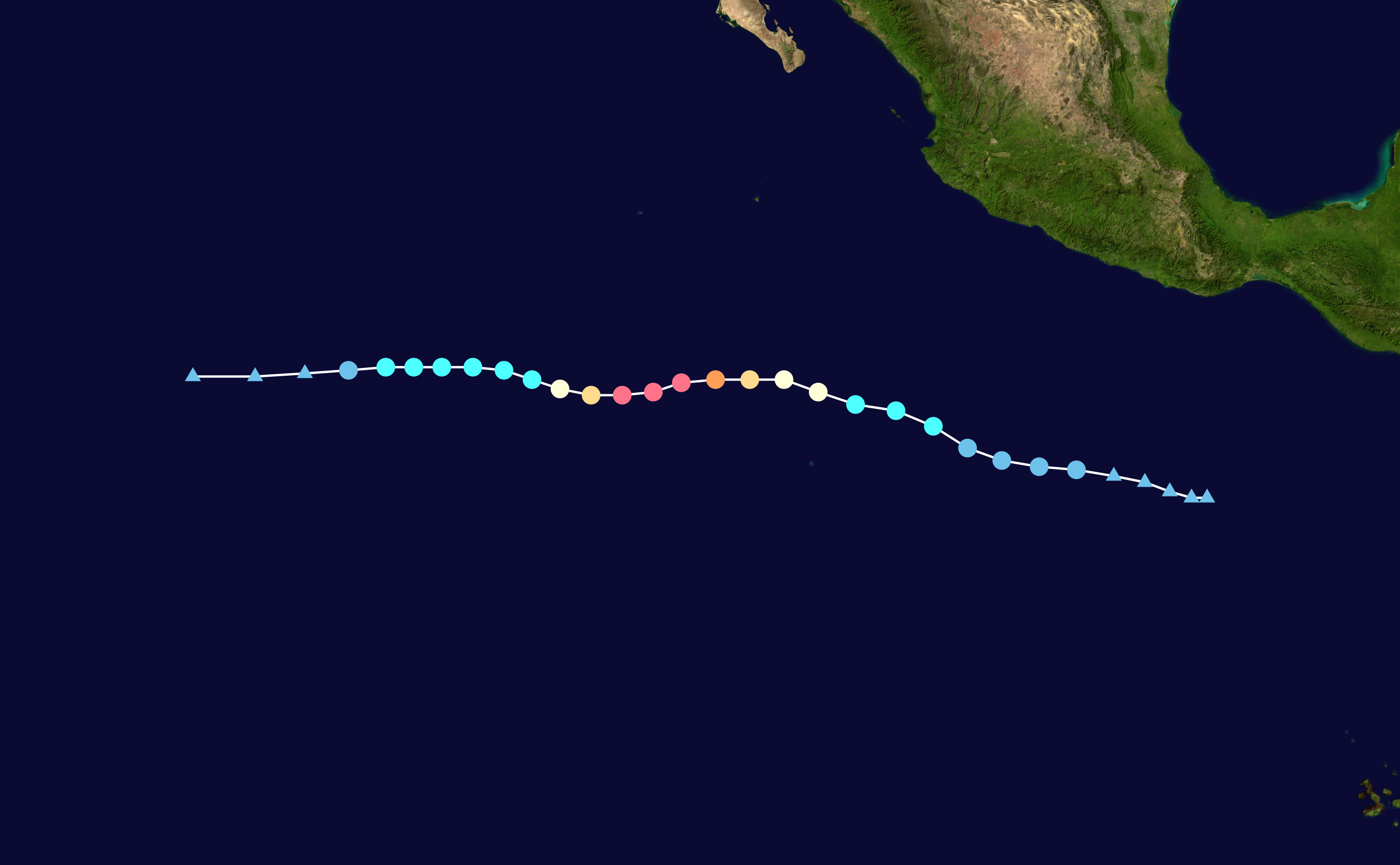
- Duration: November 19 – November 25
- Peak intensity: 145 mph (230 km/h) (1-min); 940 mbar (hPa)

A tropical wave exited western Africa on November 2. Proceeding westward, the wave reached the western Caribbean Sea 11 days later, where it developed a broad low pressure area. On November 15, the low crossed Central America and into the eastern Pacific. By that time, the low developed rainbands around a poorly-defined circulation. The system became better organized on November 17, as it moved through a favorable environment that the NHC described as "monsoon-like". Late on November 19, the low developed into Tropical Depression Thirteen-E about 460 mi (740 km) south of Acapulco. It was the latest-forming tropical cyclone in the North Pacific east of 140°W since Tropical Depression Twenty-Two-E on November 24, 1987. and Kenneth was the latest forming named storm since Winnie in 1983. On November 20, the depression intensified into Tropical Storm Kenneth, following an increase in convection. It was the latest forming named storm in the North Pacific east of 140°W since Winnie in 1983.

Kenneth moved an area of low wind shear and water temperatures over 82 °F (28 °C), allowing it to rapidly intensify. It became a hurricane on November 21, and a major hurricane the next day. At the time, Kenneth was the latest major hurricane in the east Pacific, surpassing Hurricane Xina in 1985. At 18:00 UTC on November 22, Kenneth reached peak estimated winds of 145 mph (220 km/h) late, with a minimum pressure of 940 mbar (28 inHg). This was based on satellite imagery analysis of the hurricane's well-defined cloud-free eye. This made it the most powerful late-season storm ever recorded in the eastern north Pacific at the time. Kenneth's records were surpassed later by Hurricane Sandra in 2015, which reached peak winds of 150 mph (240 km/h) on November 26. After maintaining peak winds for about 12 hours, Kenneth began weakening due to dry air and cold water upwelling. Late on November 23, Kenneth fell to tropical storm status. Two days later, it deteriorated into a tropical depression as the convection diminished. On November 25, Kenneth degenerated into a remnant low, which continued westward until dissipating on a day later.

== Storm names ==
The following list of names was used for named storms that formed in the North Pacific Ocean east of 140°W in 2011. This is the same list used for the 2005 season as no names were retired afterwards by the World Meteorological Organization. No names were retired this season. This list was reused for the 2017 season.

- Adrian
- Beatriz
- Calvin
- Dora
- Eugene
- Fernanda *
- Greg
- Hilary
- Irwin
- Jova
- Kenneth
- Lidia (unused)
- Max (unused)
- Norma (unused)
- Otis (unused)
- Pilar (unused)
- Ramon (unused)
- Selma (unused)
- Todd (unused)
- Veronica (unused)
- Wiley (unused)
- Xina (unused)
- York (unused)
- Zelda (unused)

For storms that form in the North Pacific between 140°W to the International Date Line, the names come from a series of four rotating lists. Names are used one after the other without regard to year, and when the bottom of one list is reached, the next named storm receives the name at the top of the next list. No named storms formed within the area in 2011. Named storms in the table above that crossed into the area during the season are noted (*).

== Season effects ==
This is a table of all of the tropical cyclones that formed in the 2011 Pacific hurricane season. It includes their name, duration (within the basin), peak classification and intensities, areas affected, damage, and death totals. Deaths in parentheses are additional and indirect (an example of an indirect death would be a traffic accident), but were still related to that storm. Damage and deaths include totals while the storm was extratropical, a wave, or a low, and all of the damage figures are in 2011 USD.

Saffir–Simpson scale
TD	TS	C1	C2	C3	C4	C5

2011 Pacific hurricane season statistics
Storm name	Dates active	Storm category at peak intensity	Max 1-min wind mph (km/h)	Min. press. (mbar)	Areas affected	Damage (US$)	Deaths	Ref(s).
Adrian	June 7–12	Category 4 hurricane	140 (220)	944	Southwestern Mexico	Minimal	0	
Beatriz	June 19–22	Category 1 hurricane	90 (150)	977	Southwestern Mexico, Western Mexico	Minimal	4	
Calvin	July 7–10	Category 1 hurricane	80 (130)	984	None	None	0	
Dora	July 18–24	Category 4 hurricane	155 (250)	929	Southwestern Mexico, Western Mexico, Baja California Peninsula, Southwestern United States	Minimal	5	
Eugene	July 31 – August 6	Category 4 hurricane	140 (220)	942	None	None	0	
Fernanda	August 15–19	Tropical storm	70 (110)	992	None	None	0	
Greg	August 16–21	Category 1 hurricane	85 (140)	979	None	None	0	
Eight-E	August 31 – September 1	Tropical depression	35 (55)	1002	Southwestern Mexico, Western Mexico	None	0	
Hilary	September 21–30	Category 4 hurricane	145 (230)	942	Southwestern Mexico	Minimal	3	
Jova	October 6–13	Category 3 hurricane	125 (205)	955	Southwestern Mexico, Western Mexico	≥$204 million	9	
Irwin	October 6–16	Category 2 hurricane	100 (155)	976	Western Mexico	None	0	
Twelve-E	October 12	Tropical depression	35 (55)	1004	Southwestern Mexico, Central America	Unknown	36	
Kenneth	November 19–25	Category 4 hurricane	145 (230)	940	None	None	0	
Season aggregates
13 systems	June 7 – November 25		155 (250)	929		≥$204 million	52	

== See also ==
- Tropical cyclones in 2011
- List of Pacific hurricanes
- Pacific hurricane season
- 2011 Atlantic hurricane season
- 2011 Pacific typhoon season
- 2011 North Indian Ocean cyclone season
- South-West Indian Ocean cyclone seasons: 2010–11, 2011–12
- Australian region cyclone seasons: 2010–11, 2011–12
- South Pacific cyclone seasons: 2010–11, 2011–12
- South Atlantic tropical cyclone
