= Timeline of the 2011 Pacific hurricane season =

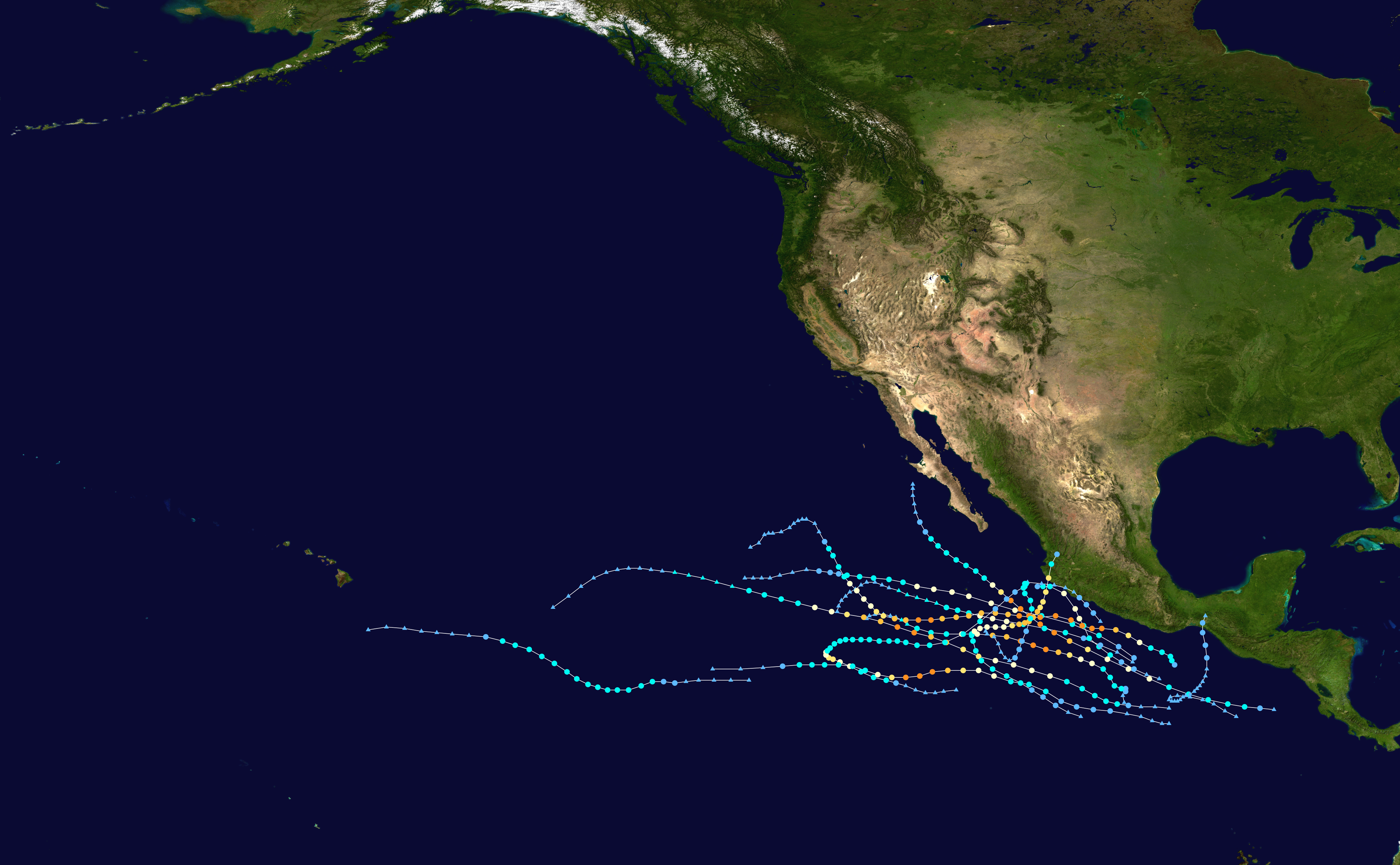
- Season summary map

Season boundaries
- First system formed: June 7, 2011
- Last system dissipated: November 25, 2011

Strongest system
- Name: Dora
- Maximum winds: 155 mph (250 km/h) (1-minute sustained)
- Lowest pressure: 929 mbar (hPa; 27.43 inHg)

Longest lasting system
- Name: Irwin
- Duration: 10.75 days
Storm articles
- Hurricane Adrian (2011)
- Hurricane Beatriz (2011)
- Hurricane Dora (2011)
- Hurricane Hilary (2011)
- Hurricane Jova (2011)
- Tropical Depression Twelve-E (2011)

The 2011 Pacific hurricane season consisted of the events that occurred in the annual cycle of tropical cyclone formation over the Pacific Ocean north of the equator and east of the International Date Line. The official bounds of each Pacific hurricane season are dates that conventionally delineate the period each year during which tropical cyclones tend to form in the basin according to the National Hurricane Center (NHC), beginning on May 15 in the Eastern Pacific proper (east of 140°W) and June 1 in the Central Pacific (140°W to the International Date Line), and ending on November 30 in both areas. However, tropical cyclogenesis is possible at any time of year. The season generated eleven tropical storms, which is below the 1991–2020 average of fifteen. However, all but one became hurricanes and six further strengthened into major hurricanes, (Note: A major hurricane is a Pacific or Atlantic hurricane that reaches Category 3 or higher on the five-level Saffir–Simpson scale, with maximum sustained winds of at least 111 mph (179 km/h).) eclipsing the 1991–2020 averages of eight hurricanes and four major hurricanes. There were also two tropical depressions that remained below tropical storm status. The first system, Hurricane Adrian, formed on June 7; the final, Hurricane Kenneth, was the latest in a calendar year to exist east of 140°W since 1983, dissipating on November 25.

Several tropical cyclones impacted land during the 2011 season. The deadliest was Tropical Depression Twelve-E, which was part of a large area of torrential rains over Central America in mid-October. Widespread and destructive flooding and mudslides occurred in southeastern Mexico and Guatemala; at least thirty-six fatalities were directly attributed to the tropical depression itself, with many more in Central America being blamed on the overall weather system. (Note: Cited to multiple sources:) On the same day that Twelve-E made landfall, Hurricane Jova came ashore further to the west, in the Mexican state of Jalisco, at Category 2 strength; high winds and heavy rains killed nine people and caused at least MX$3.164 billion (US$254.3 million) in losses. (Note: The estimate of monetary losses due to Hurricane Jova was ascertained by combining figures provided by La Jornada – MX$885 million (US$71.1 million) in Jalisco; and CENAPRED – MX$2.279 billion (US$183.2 million) in Colima.) Hurricane Beatriz in June claimed four lives when it passed a short distance off the Mexican state of Colima, producing strong winds and locally significant flooding on land. Hurricanes Adrian in early June, Dora in July, and Hilary in late September all threatened or brushed the Pacific coast of Mexico but only caused minor peripheral effects.

This timeline documents tropical cyclone formations, strengthening, weakening, landfalls, extratropical transitions, and dissipations during the season. It includes information that was not released throughout the season, meaning that data from post-storm reviews by the National Hurricane Center and the Central Pacific Hurricane Center, such as a storm that was not initially warned upon, has been included.

The time stamp for each event is first stated using Coordinated Universal Time (UTC), the 24-hour clock where 00:00 = midnight UTC. The NHC uses both UTC and the time zone where the center of the tropical cyclone is currently located. Prior to 2015, two time zones were utilized in the Eastern Pacific basin: Pacific east of 140°W, and Hawaii−Aleutian from 140°W to the International Date Line. In this timeline, the respective area time is included in parentheses. Additionally, figures for maximum sustained winds and position estimates are rounded to the nearest 5 units (miles, or kilometers), following National Hurricane Center practice. Direct wind observations are rounded to the nearest whole number. Atmospheric pressures are listed to the nearest millibar and nearest hundredth of an inch of mercury.

== Timeline of events ==
=== May ===
May 15

- The 2011 East Pacific hurricane season officially begins.

=== June ===
June 1

- The 2011 Central Pacific hurricane season officially begins.

June 7

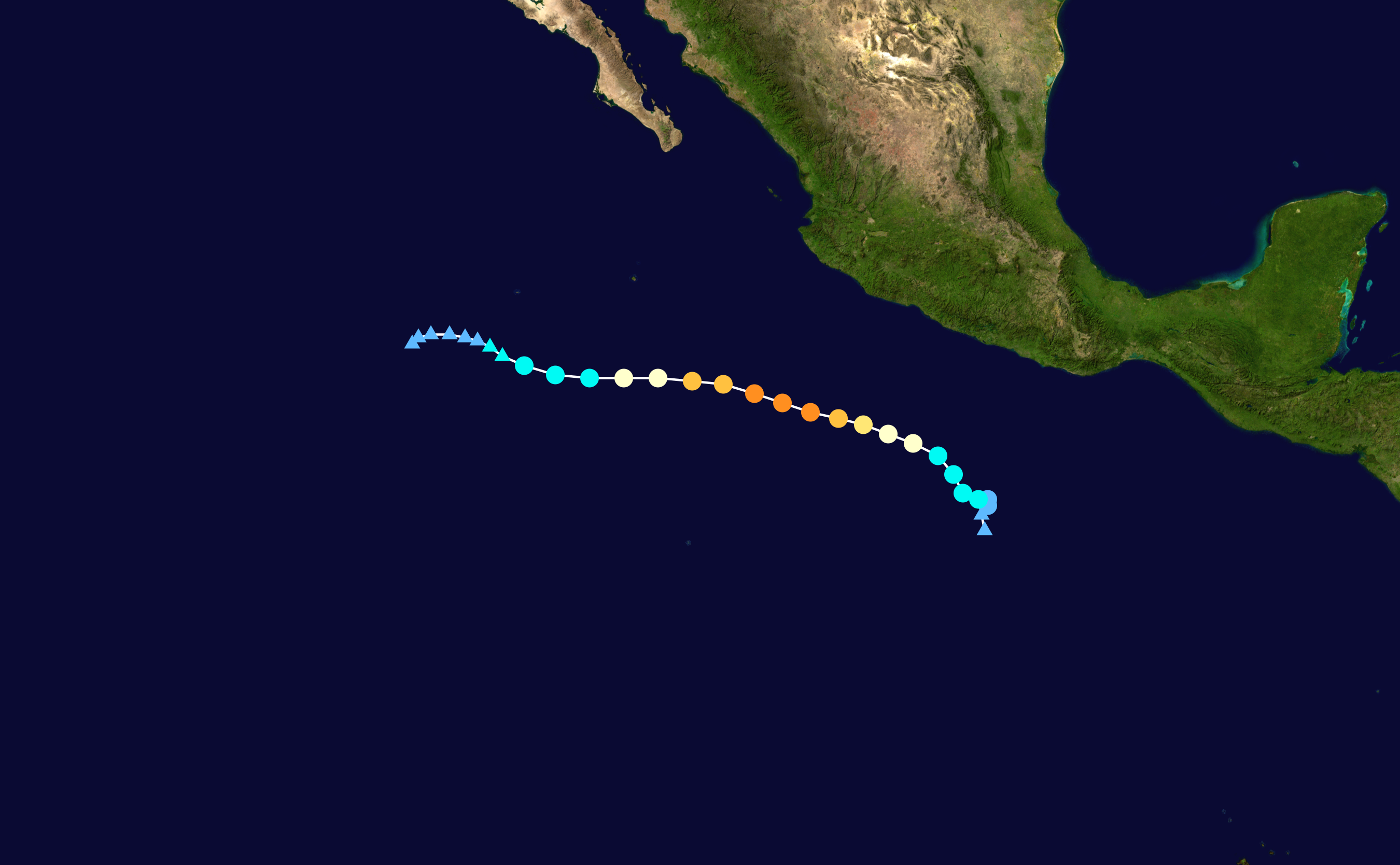
Track map of Hurricane Adrian

- 12:00 UTC (5:00 a.m. PDT) at 11.5°N 99.6°W – A tropical depression develops from an area of low pressure about 370 mi (595 km) south of Acapulco, Guerrero.

June 8

- 00:00 UTC (5:00 p.m. PDT, June 7) at 11.7°N 99.9°W – The aforementioned tropical depression strengthens into Tropical Storm Adrian about 355 mi (575 km) south of Acapulco, Guerrero.

June 9

- 00:00 UTC (5:00 p.m. PDT, June 8) at 13.5°N 102.0°W – Tropical Storm Adrian strengthens into a Category 1 hurricane about 270 mi (435 km) south-southwest of Acapulco, Guerrero.
- 12:00 UTC (5:00 a.m. PDT) at 14.1°N 103.6°W – Hurricane Adrian strengthens to Category 2 intensity about 310 mi (500 km) southwest of Acapulco, Guerrero.
- 18:00 UTC (11:00 a.m. PDT) at 14.3°N 104.4°W – Hurricane Adrian strengthens to Category 3 intensity about 350 mi (565 km) west-southwest of Acapulco, Guerrero, making it the first major hurricane of the season.

June 10

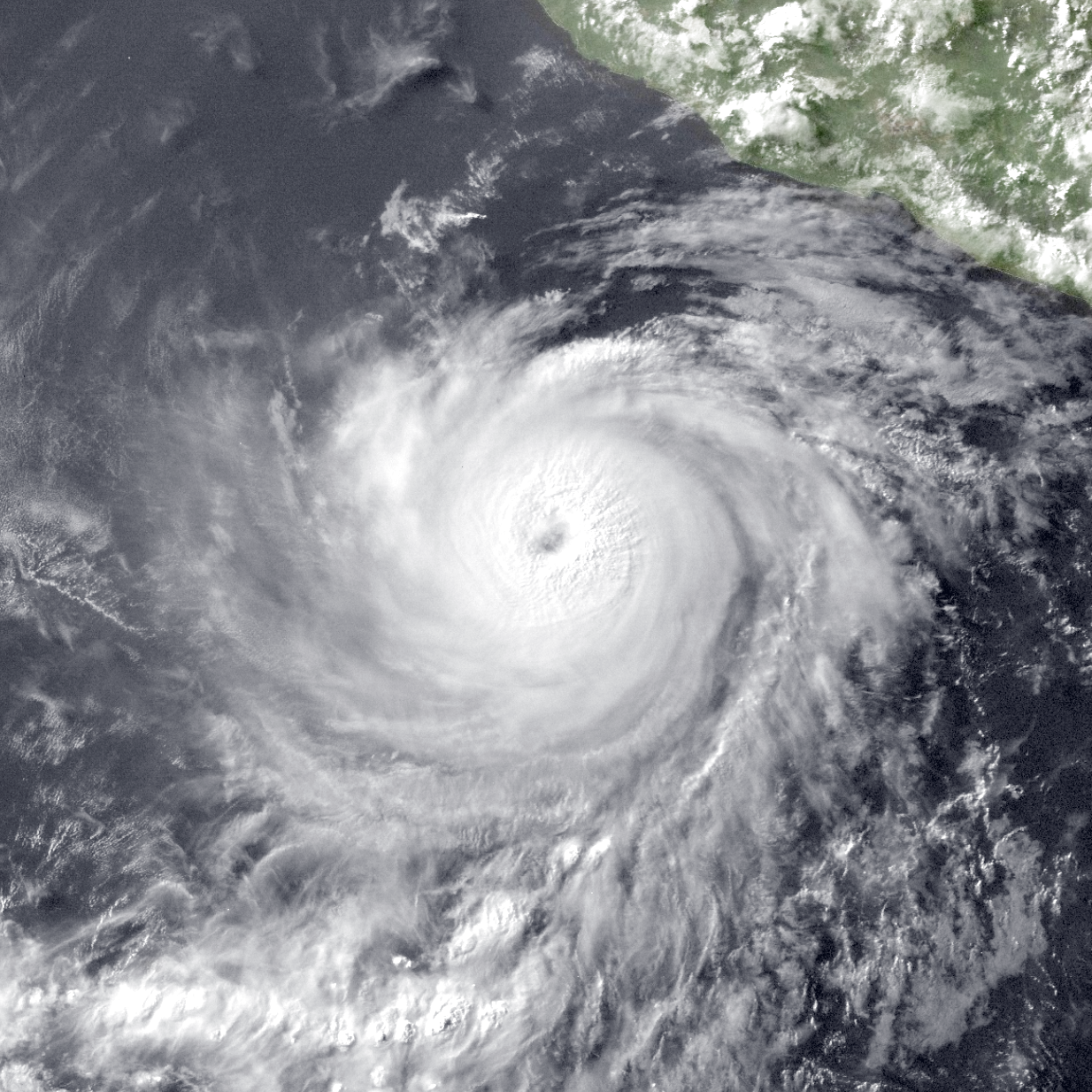
Satellite image of Hurricane Adrian near peak intensity early on June 10

- 00:00 UTC (5:00 p.m. PDT, June 9) at 14.5°N 105.3°W – Hurricane Adrian strengthens to Category 4 intensity about 395 mi (640 km) west-southwest of Acapulco, Guerrero; it simultaneously attains peak winds of 140 mph (220 km/h).
- 06:00 UTC (11:00 p.m. PDT, June 9) at 14.8°N 106.2°W – Hurricane Adrian attains a minimum barometric pressure of 944 mbar (27.88 inHg) about 445 mi (715 km) west-southwest of Acapulco, Guerrero.
- 18:00 UTC (11:00 a.m. PDT) at 15.4°N 108.1°W – Hurricane Adrian weakens to Category 3 intensity about 530 mi (850 km) south-southeast of Cabo San Lucas, Baja California Sur.

June 11

- 06:00 UTC (11:00 p.m. PDT, June 10) at 15.6°N 110.2°W – Hurricane Adrian rapidly weakens to Category 1 intensity, skipping Category 2 status, about 500 mi (805 km) south of Cabo San Lucas, Baja California Sur.
- 18:00 UTC (11:00 a.m. PDT) at 15.6°N 112.4°W – Hurricane Adrian weakens into a tropical storm about 530 mi (850 km) south-southwest of Cabo San Lucas, Baja California Sur.

June 12

- 12:00 UTC (5:00 a.m. PDT) at 16.3°N 115.2°W – Tropical Storm Adrian degenerates into a post-tropical cyclone about 570 mi (915 km) southwest of Cabo San Lucas, Baja California Sur.

June 19

- 06:00 UTC (11:00 p.m. PDT, June 18) at 13.1°N 99.0°W – A tropical depression develops from an area of low pressure about 265 mi (425 km) south-southeast of Acapulco, Guerrero.
- 18:00 UTC (11:00 a.m. PDT) at 14.1°N 100.7°W – The tropical depression strengthens into Tropical Storm Beatriz about 195 mi (315 km) south-southwest of Acapulco, Guerrero.

June 20

- 18:00 UTC (11:00 a.m. PDT) at 16.7°N 102.9°W – Tropical Storm Beatriz strengthens into a Category 1 hurricane about 190 mi (305 km) south-southeast of Manzanillo, Colima.

June 21

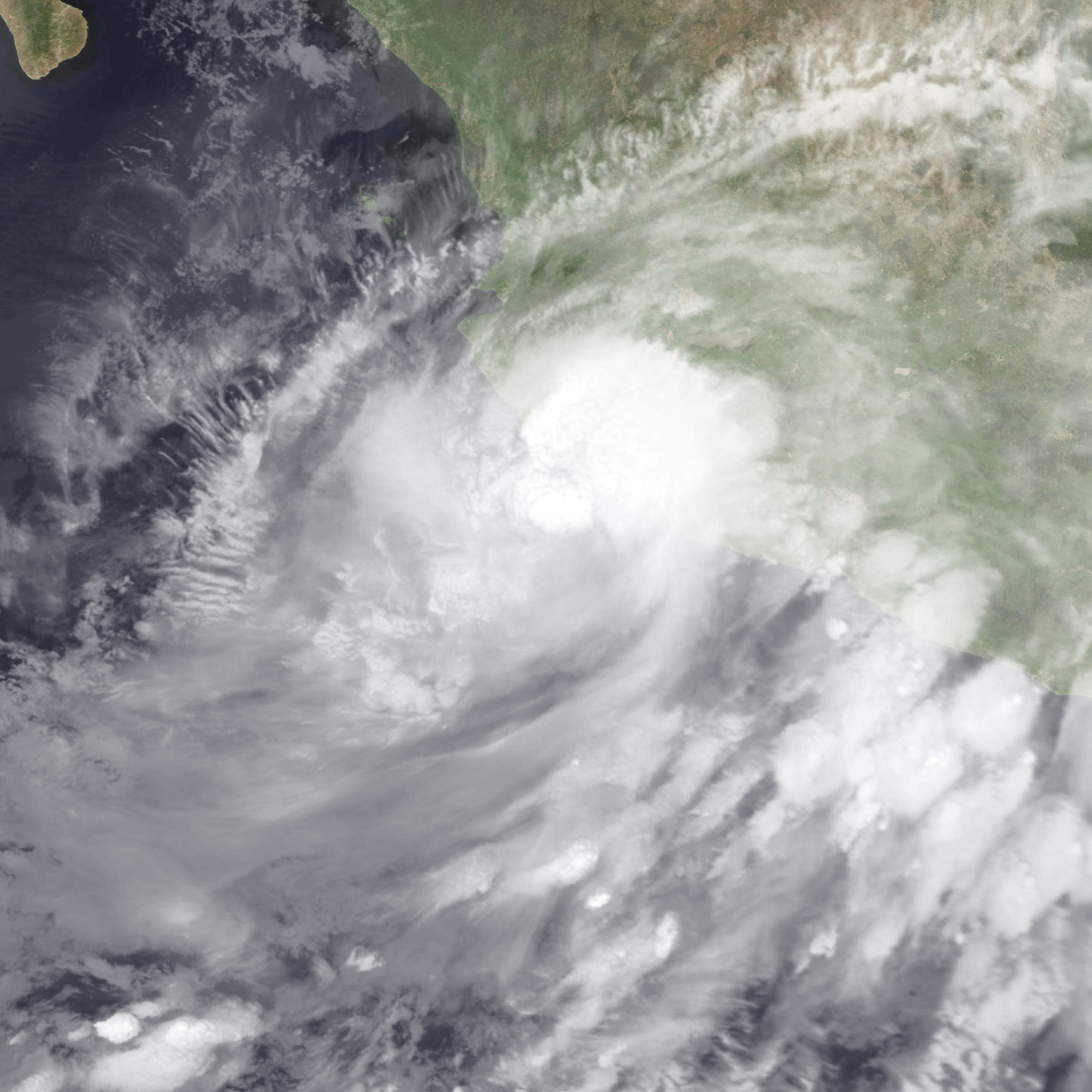
Short-wave infrared satellite image of Hurricane Beatriz making its closest approach to Mexico early on June 21

- 06:00 UTC (11:00 p.m. PDT, June 20) at 18.5°N 104.0°W – Hurricane Beatriz attains peak winds of 90 mph (150 km/h) and a minimum barometric pressure of 977 mbar (28.85 inHg) about 45 mi (75 km) south-southeast of Manzanillo, Colima. Within the next three hours, the eye of Beatriz passes within 15 mi (30 km) of the Pacific coast of Mexico.
- 12:00 UTC (5:00 a.m. PDT) at 19.0°N 105.0°W – Hurricane Beatriz weakens into a tropical storm about 45 mi (75 km) west of Manzanillo, Colima.

June 22

- 00:00 UTC (5:00 p.m. PDT, June 21) at 19.0°N 105.9°W – Tropical Storm Beatriz weakens into a tropical depression about 105 mi (165 km) west of Manzanillo, Colima; it dissipates six hours later.

=== July ===
July 7

- 12:00 UTC (5:00 a.m. PDT) at 14.8°N 101.4°W – A tropical depression develops from an area of low pressure about 175 mi (280 km) southwest of Acapulco, Guerrero.

July 8

- 00:00 UTC (5:00 p.m. PDT, July 7) at 15.7°N 103.9°W – The aforementioned tropical depression strengthens into Tropical Storm Calvin about 205 mi (335 km) southwest of Zihuatanejo, Guerrero.
- 18:00 UTC (11:00 a.m. PDT) at 16.5°N 108.1°W – Tropical Storm Calvin strengthens into a Category 1 hurricane about 305 mi (490 km) southwest of Manzanillo, Colima.

July 9

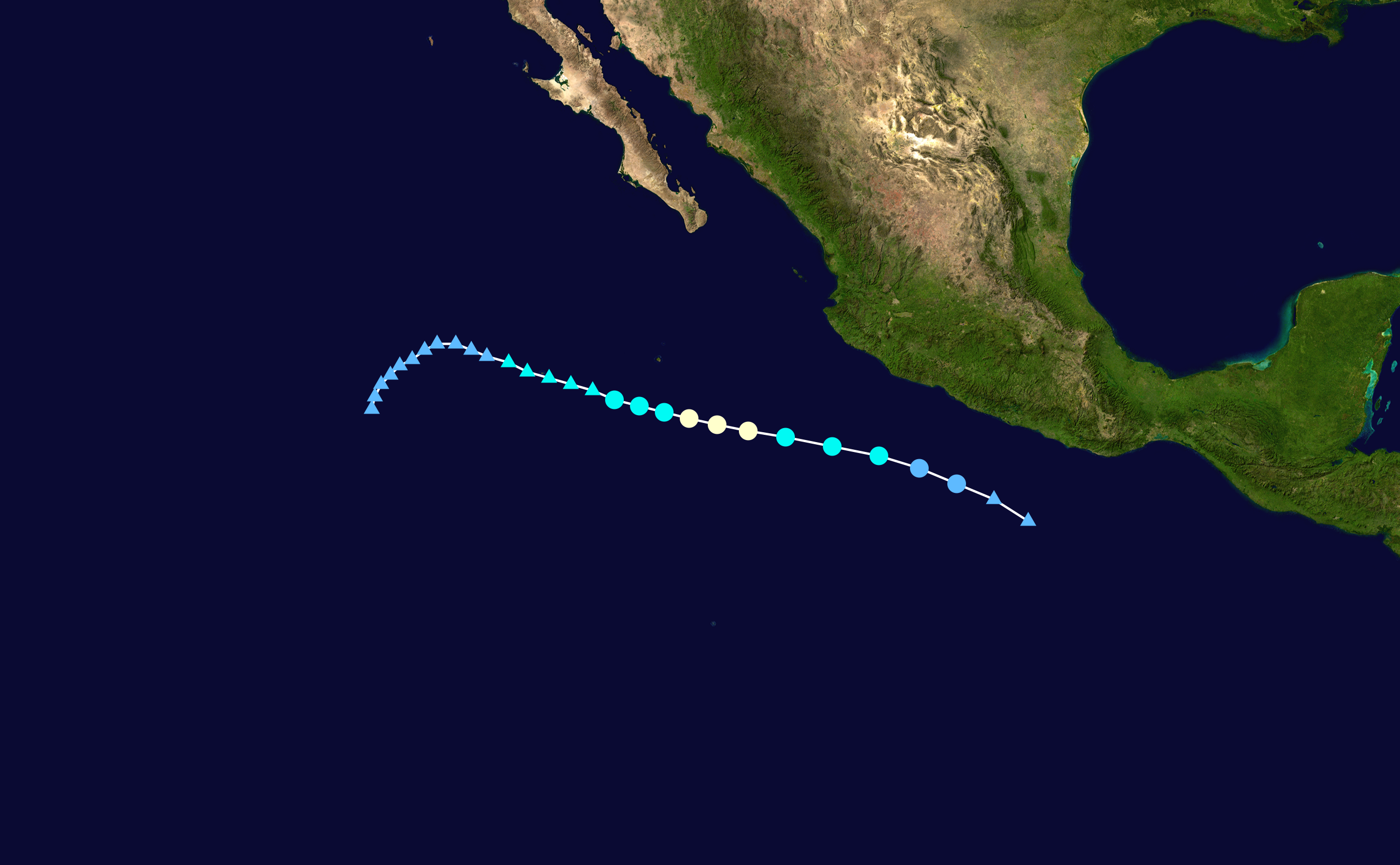
Track map of Hurricane Calvin

- 00:00 UTC (5:00 p.m. PDT, July 8) at 16.7°N 109.1°W – Hurricane Calvin attains peak winds of 80 mph (130 km/h) and a minimum barometric pressure of 984 mbar (29.06 inHg) about 350 mi (565 km) west-southwest of Manzanillo, Colima.
- 12:00 UTC (5:00 a.m. PDT) at 17.1°N 110.8°W – Hurricane Calvin weakens into a tropical storm about 270 mi (435 km) east-southeast of Clarion Island.

July 10

- 06:00 UTC (11:00 p.m. PDT, July 9) at 17.8°N 113.1°W – Tropical Storm Calvin degenerates into a post-tropical cyclone about 115 mi (185 km) east-southeast of Clarion Island.

July 18

- 06:00 UTC (11:00 p.m. PDT, July 17) at 10.3°N 90.0°W – A tropical depression develops from an area of low pressure about 240 mi (390 km) south-southwest of San Salvador, El Salvador.
- 12:00 UTC (5:00 a.m. PDT) at 10.4°N 91.1°W – The tropical depression strengthens into Tropical Storm Dora about 260 mi (415 km) south-southwest of San Salvador, El Salvador.

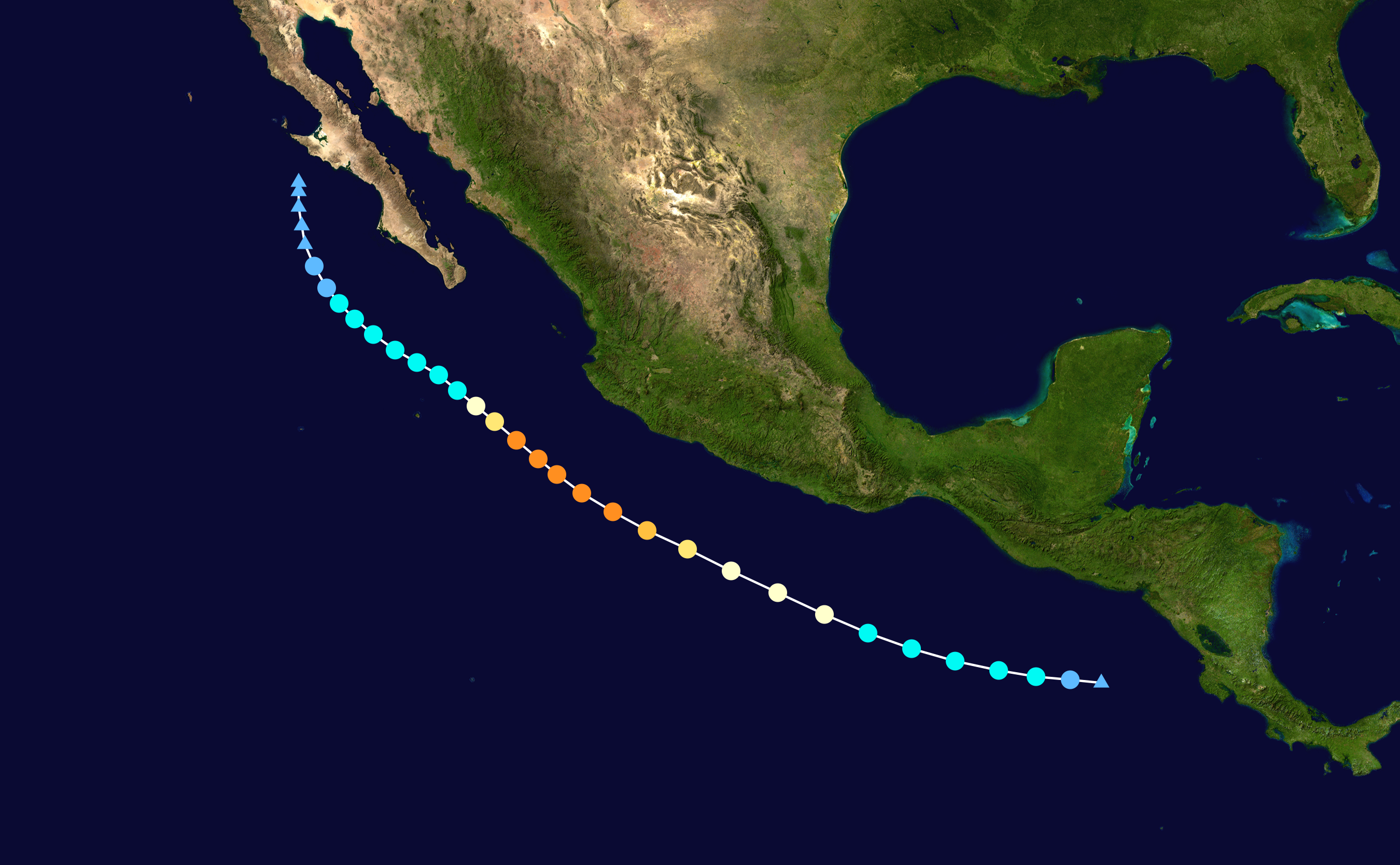
Track map of Hurricane Dora

July 19

- 18:00 UTC (11:00 a.m. PDT) at 12.4°N 97.9°W – Tropical Storm Dora strengthens into a Category 1 hurricane about 245 mi (400 km) south-southwest of Puerto Escondido, Oaxaca.

July 20

- 12:00 UTC (5:00 a.m. PDT) at 14.5°N 102.3°W – Hurricane Dora strengthens to Category 2 intensity about 340 mi (545 km) south-southeast of Manzanillo, Colima.
- 18:00 UTC (11:00 a.m. PDT) at 15.1°N 103.6°W – Hurricane Dora strengthens to Category 3 intensity about 275 mi (445 km) south of Manzanillo, Colima, making it the second major hurricane of the season.

July 21

- 00:00 UTC (5:00 p.m. PDT, July 20) at 15.7°N 104.7°W – Hurricane Dora strengthens to Category 4 intensity about 230 mi (370 km) south of Manzanillo, Colima.
- 12:00 UTC (5:00 a.m. PDT) at 16.9°N 106.5°W – Hurricane Dora attains peak winds of 155 mph (250 km/h) and a minimum barometric pressure of 929 mbar (27.43 inHg) about 205 mi (335 km) southwest of Manzanillo, Colima, making it the strongest storm of the season.

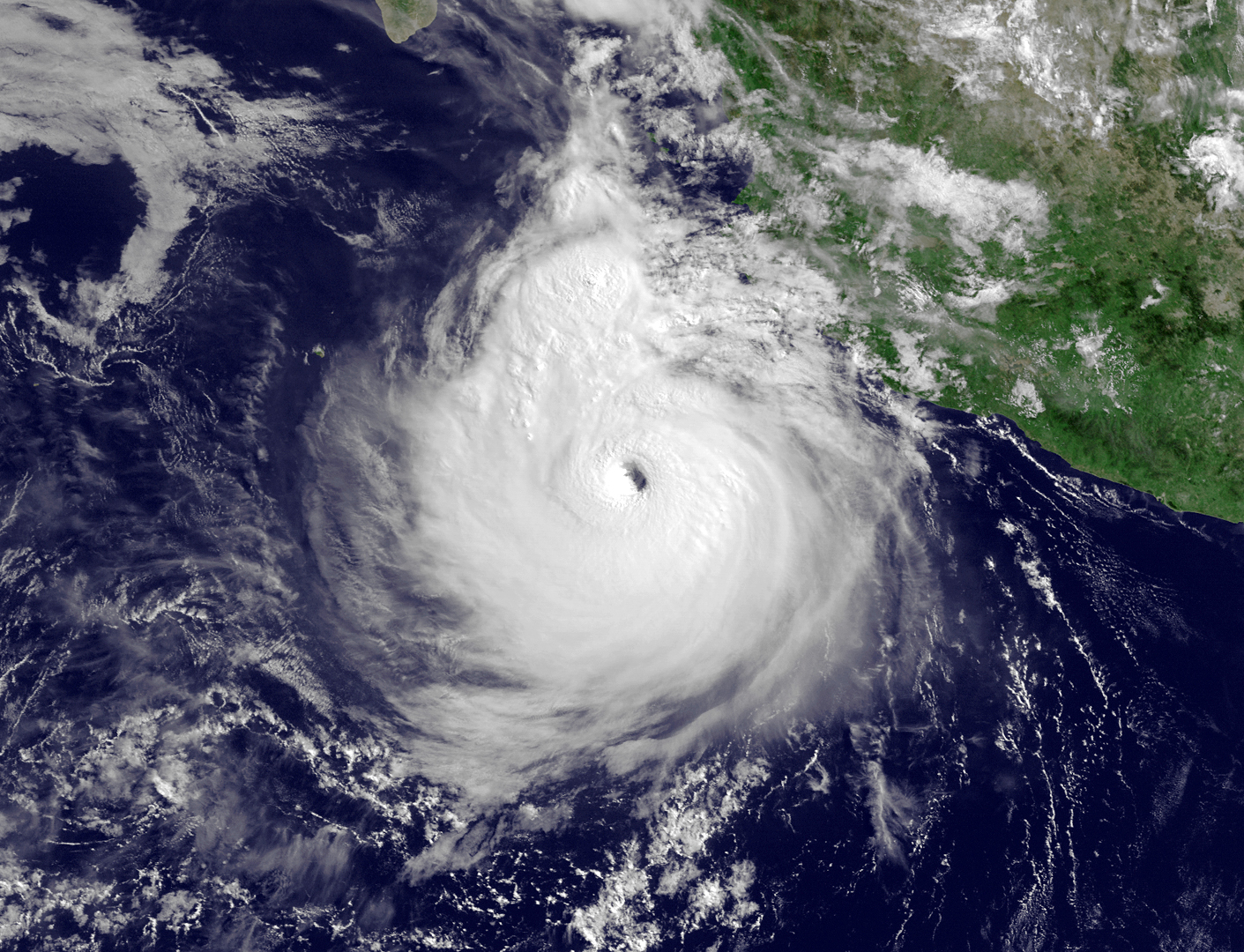
Satellite image of Hurricane Dora at peak intensity on July 21

July 22

- 06:00 UTC (11:00 p.m. PDT, July 21) at 18.6°N 108.5°W – Hurricane Dora rapidly weakens to Category 2 intensity, skipping Category 3 status, about 275 mi (445 km) west of Manzanillo, Colima.
- 12:00 UTC (5:00 a.m. PDT) at 19.1°N 109.1°W – Hurricane Dora weakens to Category 1 intensity about 265 mi (425 km) south of the southern tip of the Baja California peninsula.
- 18:00 UTC (11:00 a.m. PDT) at 19.6°N 109.7°W – Hurricane Dora weakens into a tropical storm about 225 mi (360 km) south of the southern tip of the Baja California peninsula.

July 24

- 12:00 UTC (5:00 a.m. PDT) at 22.9°N 113.9°W – Tropical Storm Dora weakens into a tropical depression about 255 mi (410 km) west of the southern tip of the Baja California peninsula.

July 25

- 00:00 UTC (5:00 p.m. PDT, July 24) at 24.3°N 114.6°W – Tropical Depression Dora degenerates into a remnant low about 310 mi (500 km) west-northwest of the southern tip of the Baja California peninsula.

July 31

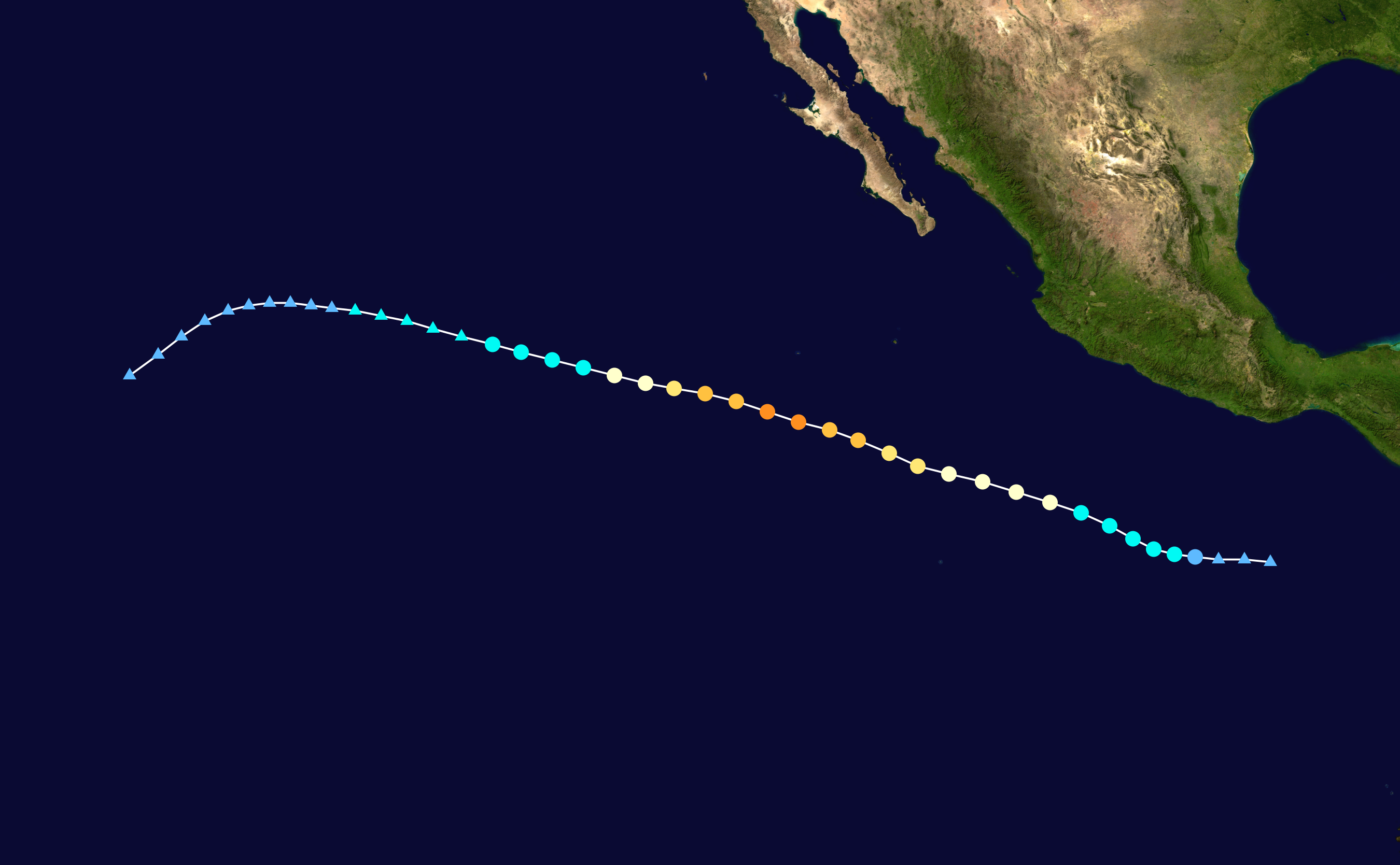
Track map of Hurricane Eugene

- 06:00 UTC (11:00 p.m. PDT, July 30) at 10.5°N 99.4°W – A tropical depression develops from an area of low pressure about 445 mi (715 km) south of Acapulco, Guerrero.
- 12:00 UTC (5:00 a.m. PDT) at 10.6°N 100.2°W – The tropical depression strengthens into Tropical Storm Eugene about 430 mi (695 km) south of Acapulco, Guerrero.

=== August ===
August 1

- 18:00 UTC (11:00 a.m. PDT) at 12.6°N 105.0°W – Tropical Storm Eugene strengthens into a Category 1 hurricane about 450 mi (725 km) southwest of Acapulco, Guerrero.

August 2

- 18:00 UTC (11:00 a.m. PDT) at 14.0°N 110.1°W – Hurricane Eugene strengthens to Category 2 intensity about 615 mi (990 km) south of the southern tip of the Baja California peninsula.

August 3

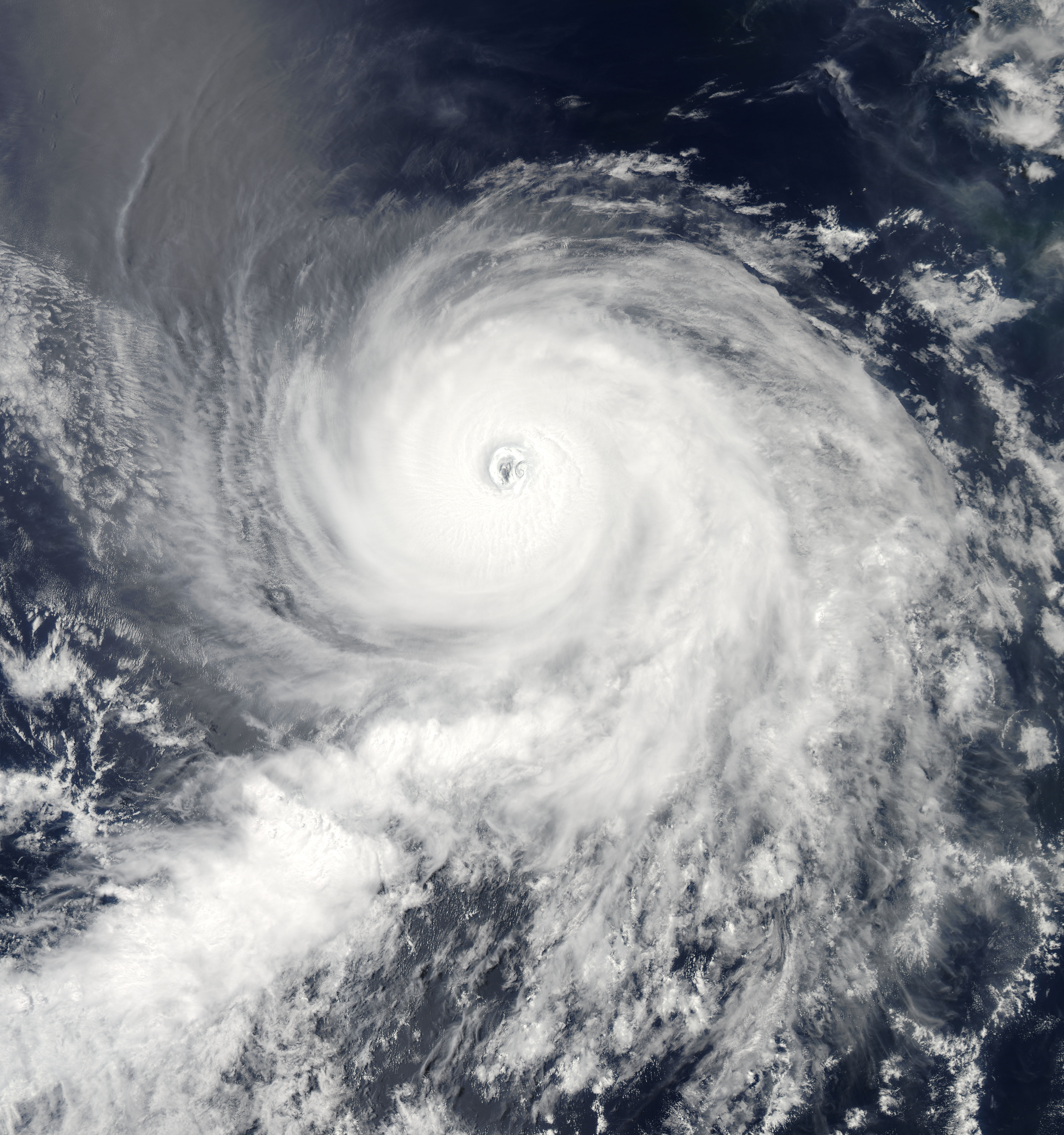
Satellite image of Hurricane Eugene at peak intensity late on August 3

- 06:00 UTC (11:00 p.m. PDT, August 2) at 15.0°N 112.4°W – Hurricane Eugene strengthens to Category 3 intensity about 565 mi (910 km) south-southwest of the southern tip of the Baja California peninsula, making it the third major hurricane of the season.
- 18:00 UTC (11:00 a.m. PDT) at 15.7°N 114.7°W – Hurricane Eugene strengthens to Category 4 intensity about 585 mi (935 km) south-southwest of the southern tip of the Baja California peninsula.
- 21:00 UTC (2:00 p.m. PDT) at 15.9°N 115.3°W – Hurricane Eugene attains peak winds of 140 mph (220 km/h) and a minimum barometric pressure of 942 mbar (27.82 inHg) about 595 mi (955 km) southwest of the southern tip of the Baja California peninsula.

August 4

- 06:00 UTC (11:00 p.m. PDT, August 3) at 16.5°N 117.1°W – Hurricane Eugene weakens to Category 3 intensity about 640 mi (1,030 km) southwest of the southern tip of the Baja California peninsula.
- 18:00 UTC (11:00 a.m. PDT) at 17.0°N 119.5°W – Hurricane Eugene weakens to Category 2 intensity about 740 mi (1,195 km) southwest of the southern tip of the Baja California peninsula.

August 5

- 00:00 UTC (5:00 p.m. PDT, August 4) at 17.2°N 120.6°W – Hurricane Eugene weakens to Category 1 intensity about 795 mi (1,280 km) west-southwest of the southern tip of the Baja California peninsula.
- 12:00 UTC (5:00 a.m. PDT) at 17.8°N 123.0°W – Hurricane Eugene weakens into a tropical storm about 915 mi (1,475 km) west-southwest of the southern tip of the Baja California peninsula.

August 6

- 12:00 UTC (5:00 a.m. PDT) at 19.0°N 127.7°W – Tropical Storm Eugene degenerates into a post-tropical cyclone about 1,175 mi (1,890 km) west-southwest of the southern tip of the Baja California peninsula.

August 15

- 18:00 UTC (11:00 a.m. PDT) at 12.1°N 131.8°W – A tropical depression develops from an area of low pressure about 1,655 mi (2,670 km) east-southeast of the Big Island of Hawaii.

August 16

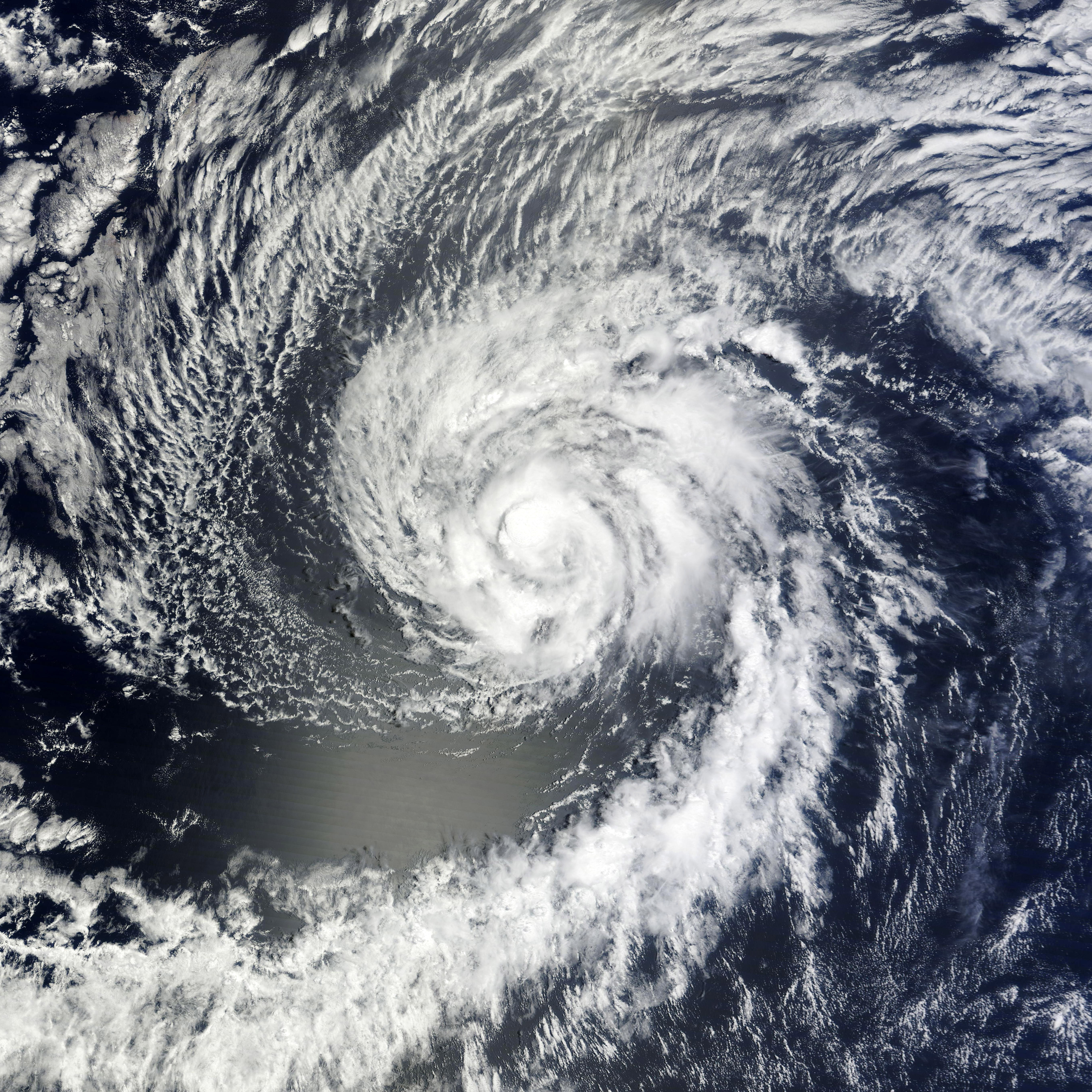
Satellite image of Tropical Storm Fernanda late on August 17

- 06:00 UTC (11:00 p.m. PDT, August 15) at 12.2°N 133.4°W – The aforementioned tropical depression strengthens into Tropical Storm Fernanda about 1,555 mi (2,500 km) east-southeast of the Big Island of Hawaii.
- 18:00 UTC (11:00 a.m. PDT) at 13.9°N 99.0°W – Another tropical depression develops from an area of low pressure about 215 mi (345 km) south-southeast of Acapulco, Guerrero.

August 17

- 06:00 UTC (11:00 p.m. PDT, August 16) at 15.5°N 101.5°W – The aforementioned tropical depression strengthens into Tropical Storm Greg about 145 mi (230 km) southwest of Acapulco, Guerrero.

August 18

- 00:00 UTC (5:00 p.m. PDT, August 17) at 17.3°N 107.5°W – Tropical Storm Greg strengthens into a Category 1 hurricane about 245 mi (400 km) south-southwest of Cabo Corrientes, Jalisco.
- 06:00 UTC (11:00 p.m. PDT, August 17) at 12.9°N 139.5°W – Tropical Storm Fernanda attains peak winds of 70 mph (110 km/h) and a minimum barometric pressure of 992 mbar (29.29 inHg) about 1,155 mi (1,860 km) east-southeast of the Big Island of Hawaii.
- 12:00 UTC (2:00 a.m. HST) at 13.5°N 140.4°W – Tropical Storm Fernanda crosses 140°W, leaving the jurisdiction of the National Hurricane Center and entering the Central Pacific Hurricane Center's area of responsibility.
- 12:00 UTC (5:00 a.m. PDT) at 18.3°N 110.8°W – Hurricane Greg attains peak winds of 85 mph (140 km/h) and a minimum barometric pressure of 979 mbar (28.91 inHg) about 365 mi (585 km) west-southwest of Cabo Corrientes, Jalisco.

August 19

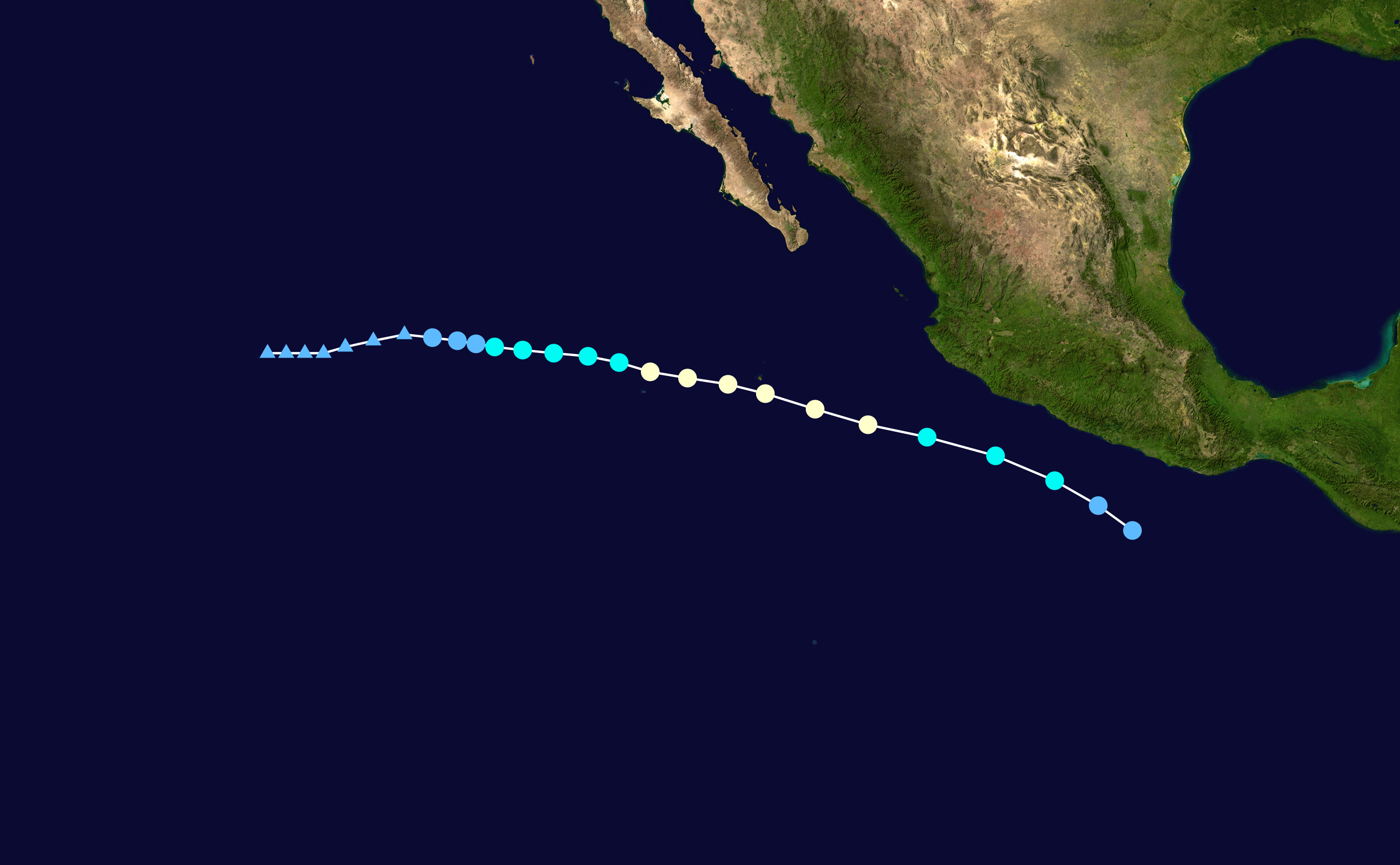
Track map of Hurricane Greg

- 12:00 UTC (5:00 a.m. PDT) at 19.3°N 115.5°W – Hurricane Greg weakens into a tropical storm about 640 mi (1,030 km) west of Cabo Corrientes, Jalisco.
- 18:00 UTC (8:00 a.m. HST) at 15.4°N 145.3°W – Tropical Storm Fernanda weakens into a tropical depression about 730 mi (1,175 km) east-southeast of the Big Island of Hawaii.

August 20

- 00:00 UTC (2:00 p.m. HST, August 19) at 15.5°N 146.5°W – Tropical Depression Fernanda degenerates into a remnant low about 655 mi (1,055 km) east-southeast of the Big Island of Hawaii.
- 18:00 UTC (11:00 a.m. PDT) at 19.9°N 120.1°W – Tropical Storm Greg weakens into a tropical depression about 930 mi (1,500 km) west of Cabo Corrientes, Jalisco.

August 21

- 12:00 UTC (5:00 a.m. PDT) at 20.2°N 122.4°W – Tropical Depression Greg degenerates into a remnant low about 1,080 mi (1,740 km) west of Cabo Corrientes, Jalisco.

August 31

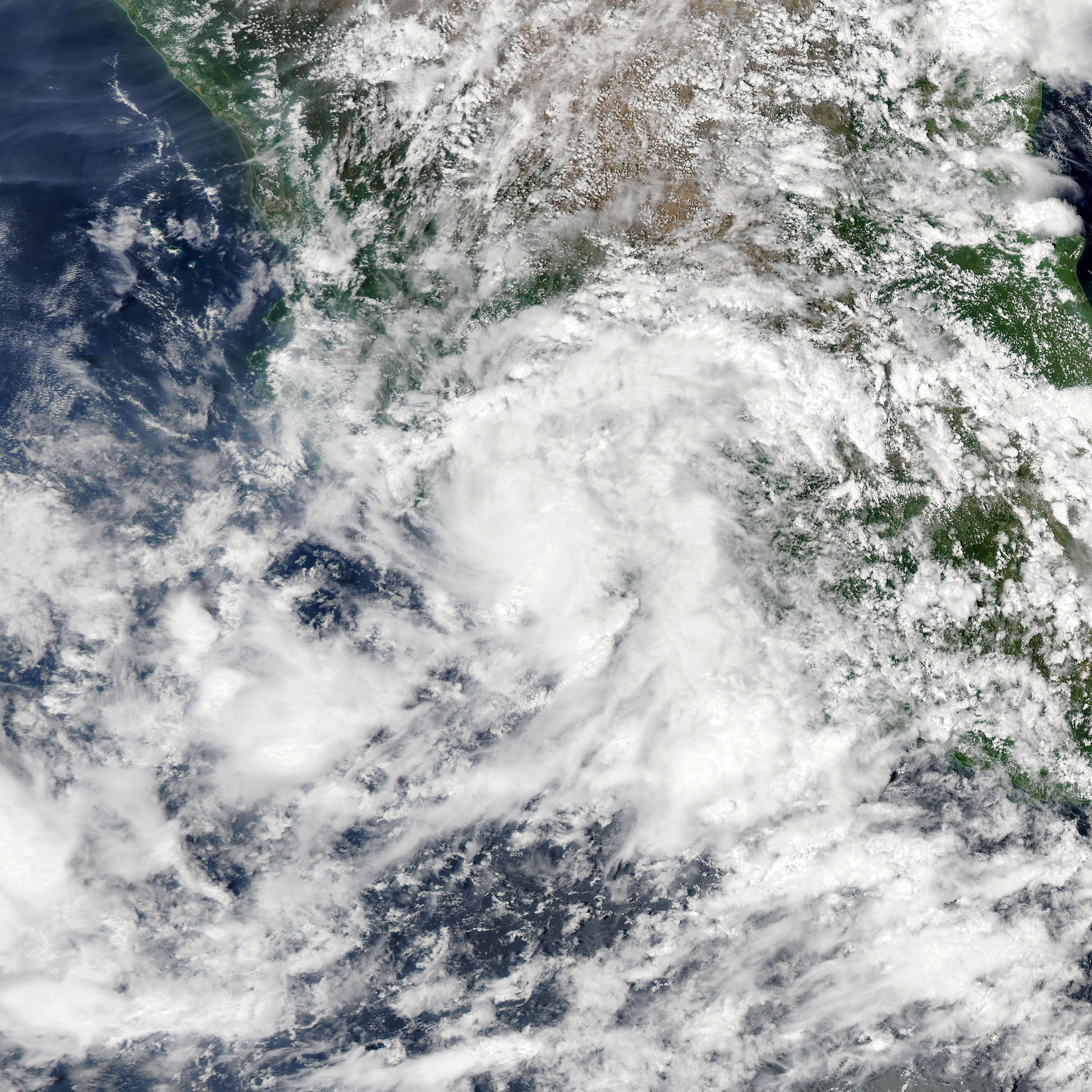
Satellite image of Tropical Depression Eight-E shortly after landfall on August 31

- 06:00 UTC (11:00 p.m. PDT, August 30) at 17.1°N 101.9°W – Tropical Depression Eight-E develops from an area of low pressure about 45 mi (75 km) south-southwest of Zihuatanejo, Guerrero; it simultaneously attains peak winds of 35 mph (55 km/h).
- 12:00 UTC (5:00 a.m. PDT) at 17.7°N 102.4°W – Tropical Depression Eight-E attains a minimum barometric pressure of 1,002 mbar (29.59 inHg) about 60 mi (95 km) west of Zihuatanejo, Guerrero.
- 17:00 UTC (10:00 a.m. PDT) at 18.1°N 102.8°W – Tropical Depression Eight-E makes landfall near Lázaro Cárdenas, Michoacán, with winds of 35 mph (55 km/h) and a barometric pressure of 1,002 mbar (29.59 inHg).

=== September ===
September 1

- 00:00 UTC (5:00 p.m. PDT, August 31) at 18.6°N 103.3°W – Tropical Depression Eight-E degenerates into a remnant low inland about 85 mi (140 km) west-northwest of Lázaro Cárdenas, Michoacán.

September 21

- 06:00 UTC (11:00 p.m. PDT, September 20) at 13.4°N 96.1°W – A tropical depression develops from a tropical wave about 345 mi (555 km) southeast of Acapulco, Guerrero.
- 12:00 UTC (5:00 a.m. PDT) at 13.7°N 96.3°W – The tropical depression strengthens into Tropical Storm Hilary about 320 mi (520 km) southeast of Acapulco, Guerrero.

September 22

- 12:00 UTC (5:00 a.m. PDT) at 15.0°N 98.6°W – Tropical Storm Hilary strengthens into a Category 1 hurricane about 155 mi (250 km) southeast of Acapulco, Guerrero.
- 18:00 UTC (11:00 a.m. PDT) at 15.5°N 99.4°W – Hurricane Hilary strengthens to Category 2 intensity about 100 mi (155 km) south-southeast of Acapulco, Guerrero.

September 23

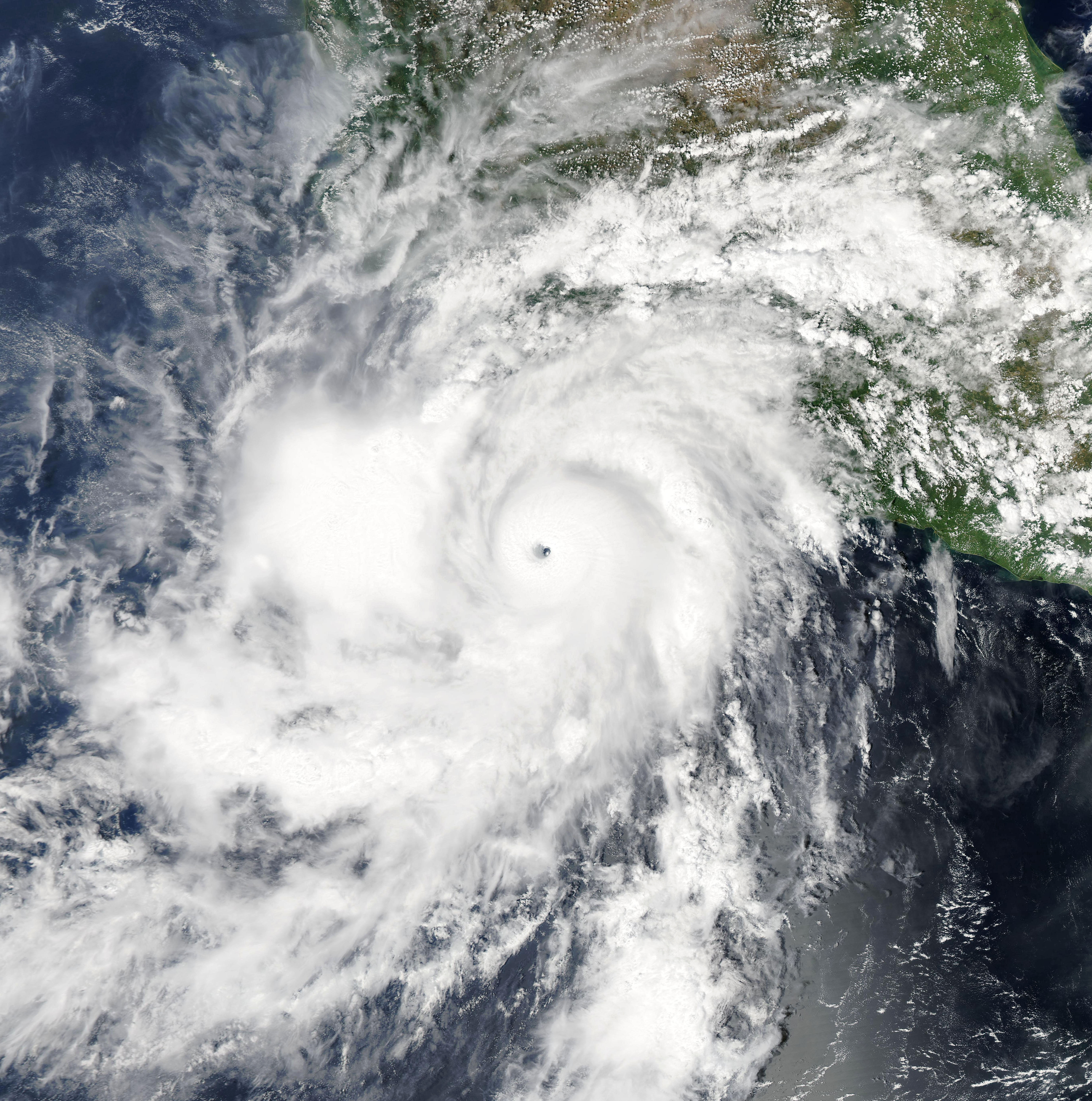
Satellite image of Hurricane Hilary at peak intensity late on September 23

- 00:00 UTC (5:00 p.m. PDT, September 22) at 15.9°N 100.3°W – Hurricane Hilary strengthens to Category 3 intensity about 75 mi (120 km) south-southwest of Acapulco, Guerrero, making it the fourth major hurricane of the season.
- 06:00 UTC (11:00 p.m. PDT, September 22) at 16.0°N 101.3°W – Hurricane Hilary strengthens to Category 4 intensity about 110 mi (175 km) southwest of Acapulco, Guerrero.
- 18:00 UTC (11:00 a.m. PDT) at 16.2°N 102.7°W – Hurricane Hilary attains peak winds of 145 mph (230 km/h) and a minimum barometric pressure of 942 mbar (27.82 inHg) about 190 mi (305 km) west-southwest of Acapulco, Guerrero.

September 25

- 06:00 UTC (11:00 p.m. PDT, September 24) at 17.0°N 108.0°W – Hurricane Hilary weakens to Category 3 intensity about 425 mi (685 km) south-southeast of the southern tip of the Baja California peninsula.

September 26

- 18:00 UTC (11:00 a.m. PDT) at 16.6°N 113.5°W – Hurricane Hilary restrengthens to Category 4 intensity about 490 mi (790 km) south-southwest of the southern tip of the Baja California peninsula. It simultaneously attains its secondary peak intensity, with winds of 130 mph (215 km/h) and a barometric pressure of 948 mbar (27.99 inHg).

September 27

- 06:00 UTC (11:00 p.m. PDT, September 26) at 16.6°N 115.3°W – Hurricane Hilary weakens back to Category 3 intensity about 550 mi (890 km) southwest of the southern tip of the Baja California peninsula.
- 18:00 UTC (11:00 a.m. PDT) at 16.9°N 116.9°W – Hurricane Hilary weakens to Category 2 intensity about 610 mi (980 km) southwest of the southern tip of the Baja California peninsula.

September 28

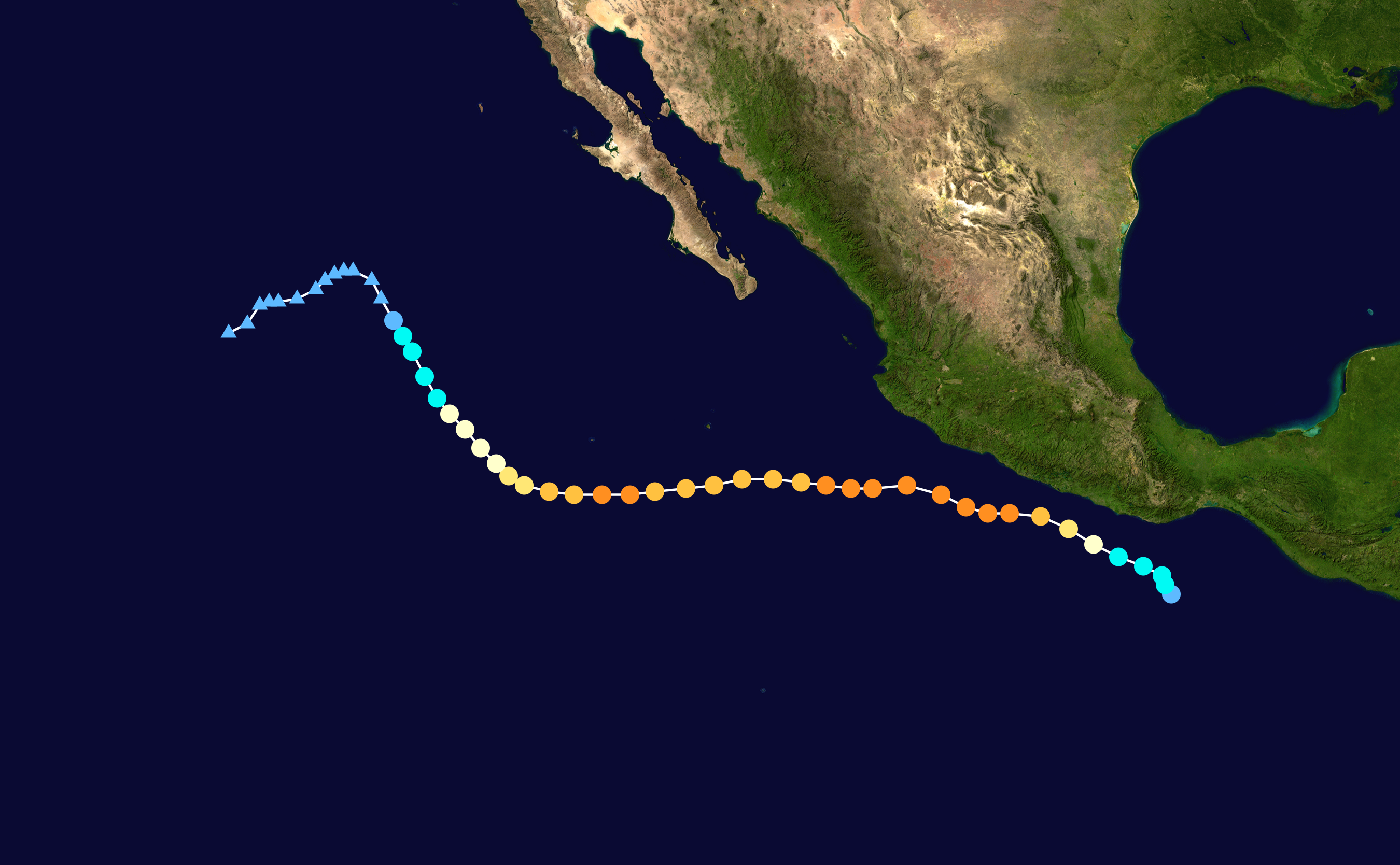
Track map of Hurricane Hilary

- 06:00 UTC (11:00 p.m. PDT, September 27) at 17.6°N 117.8°W – Hurricane Hilary weakens to Category 1 intensity about 625 mi (1,010 km) southwest of the southern tip of the Baja California peninsula.

September 29

- 06:00 UTC (11:00 p.m. PDT, September 28) at 19.7°N 119.7°W – Hurricane Hilary weakens into a tropical storm about 660 mi (1,065 km) west-southwest of the southern tip of the Baja California peninsula.

September 30

- 06:00 UTC (11:00 p.m. PDT, September 29) at 22.2°N 121.1°W – Tropical Storm Hilary weakens into a tropical depression about 715 mi (1,150 km) west of the southern tip of the Baja California peninsula.
- 12:00 UTC (5:00 a.m. PDT) at 22.9°N 121.5°W – Tropical Depression Hilary degenerates into a remnant low about 735 mi (1,185 km) west of the southern tip of the Baja California peninsula.

=== October ===
October 6

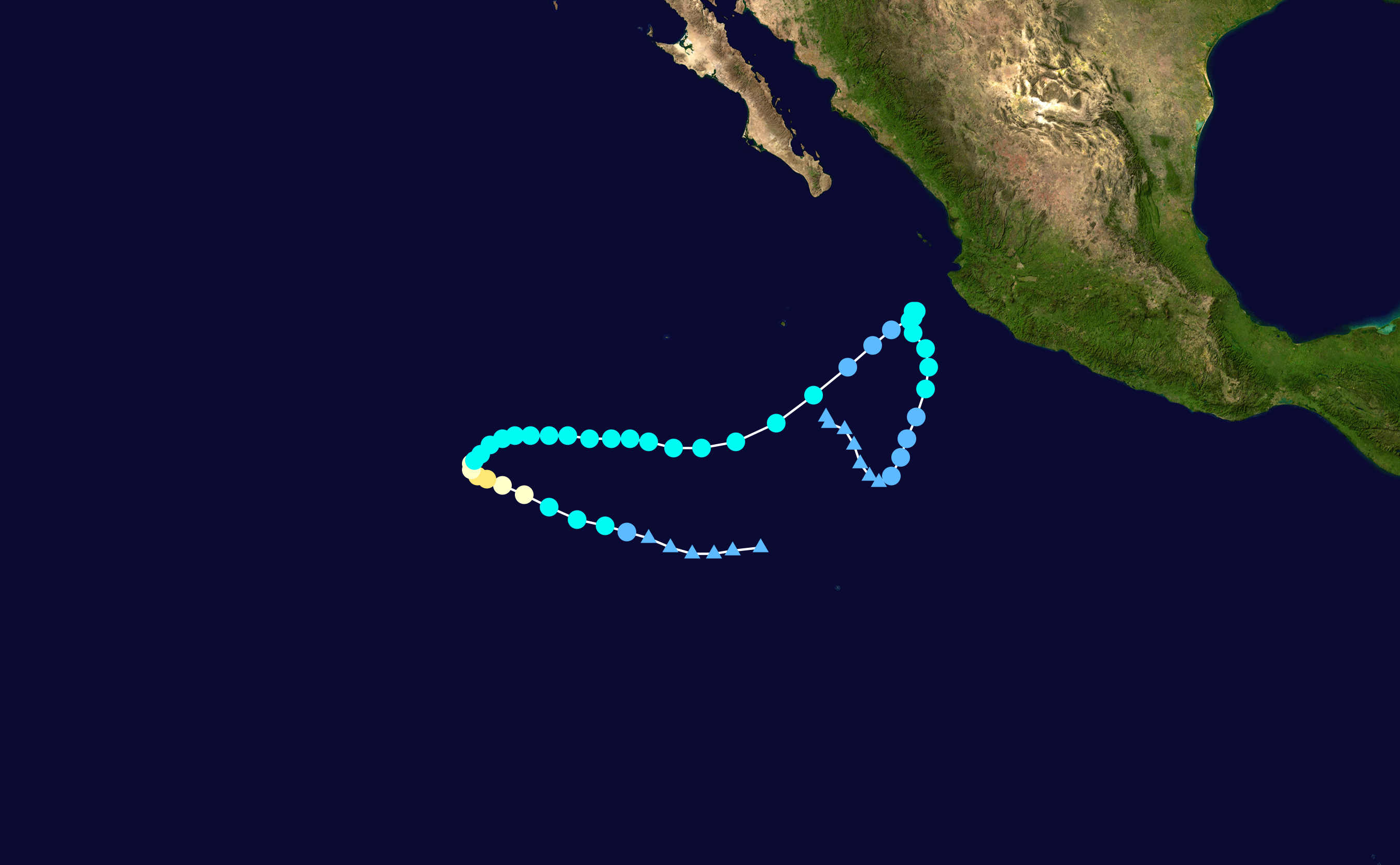

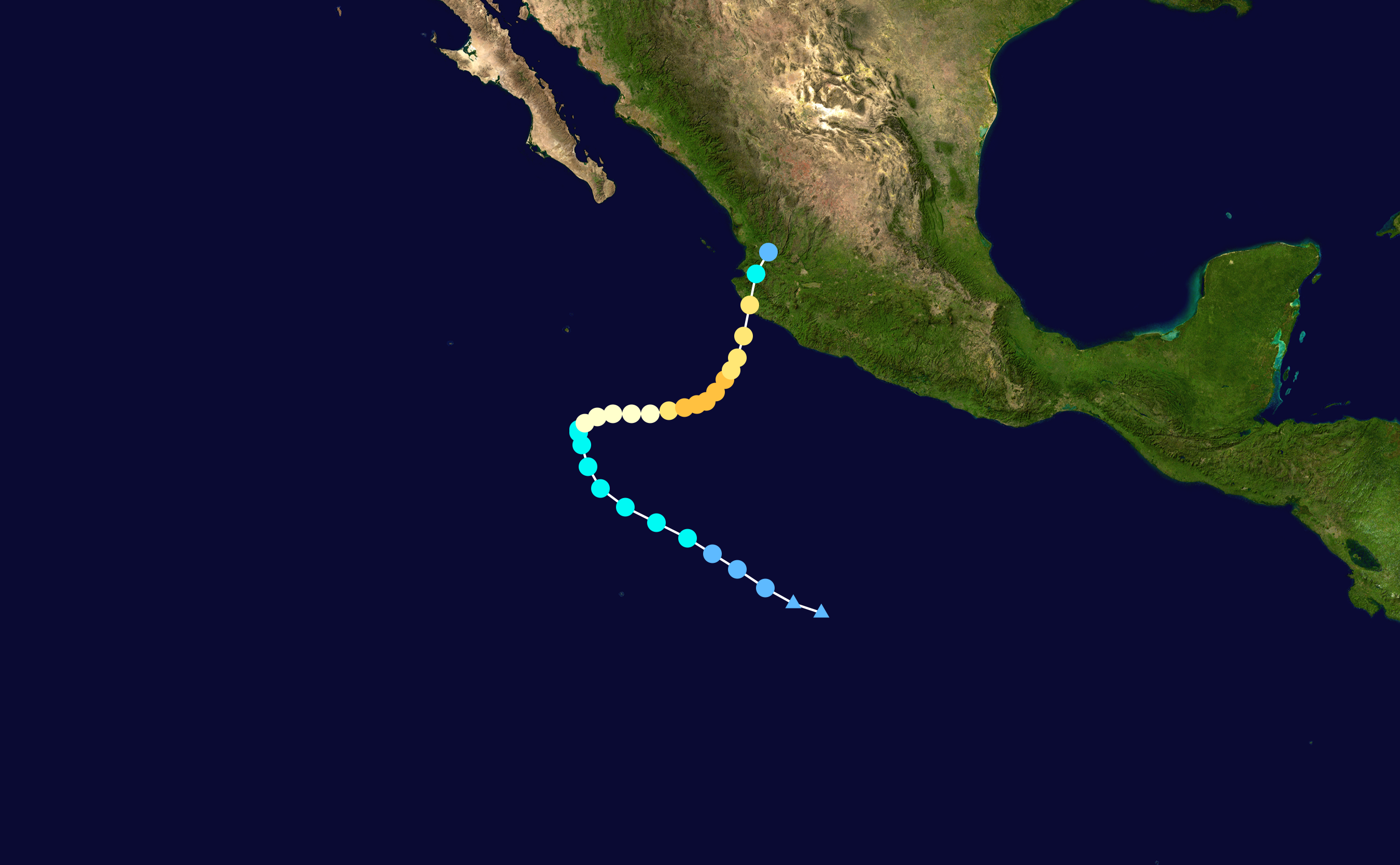
Track maps of hurricanes Irwin (top) and Jova (bottom), which developed within six hours of each other

- 00:00 UTC (5:00 p.m. PDT, October 5) at 10.5°N 104.6°W – A tropical depression develops from an area of low pressure about 540 mi (870 km) southwest of Acapulco, Guerrero.
- 06:00 UTC (11:00 p.m. PDT, October 5) at 12.1°N 116.0°W – Another tropical depression develops from an area of low pressure about 845 mi (1,360 km) south-southwest of Cabo San Lucas, Baja California Sur.
- 12:00 UTC (5:00 a.m. PDT) at 12.3°N 116.7°W – The newer tropical depression strengthens into Tropical Storm Irwin about 850 mi (1,370 km) south-southwest of Cabo San Lucas, Baja California Sur.
- 18:00 UTC (11:00 a.m. PDT) at 12.1°N 107.1°W – The tropical depression that had formed 18 hours prior strengthens into Tropical Storm Jova about 510 mi (825 km) south-southwest of Manzanillo, Colima.

October 7

- 06:00 UTC (11:00 p.m. PDT, October 6) at 13.3°N 119.3°W – Tropical Storm Irwin strengthens into a Category 1 hurricane about 905 mi (1,455 km) southwest of Cabo San Lucas, Baja California Sur.
- 18:00 UTC (11:00 a.m. PDT) at 13.8°N 120.5°W – Hurricane Irwin strengthens to Category 2 intensity about 930 mi (1,500 km) southwest of Cabo San Lucas, Baja California Sur; it simultaneously attains peak winds of 100 mph (155 km/h).

October 8

- 00:00 UTC (5:00 p.m. PDT, October 7) at 13.9°N 120.8°W – Hurricane Irwin attains a minimum barometric pressure of 976 mbar (28.82 inHg) about 945 mi (1,520 km) southwest of Cabo San Lucas, Baja California Sur.
- 06:00 UTC (11:00 p.m. PDT, October 7) at 14.1°N 121.0°W – Hurricane Irwin weakens to Category 1 intensity about 945 mi (1,520 km) southwest of Cabo San Lucas, Baja California Sur.
- 18:00 UTC (11:00 a.m. PDT) at 15.8°N 110.4°W – Tropical Storm Jova strengthens into a Category 1 hurricane about 460 mi (740 km) west-southwest of Manzanillo, Colima.
- 18:00 UTC (11:00 a.m. PDT) at 14.4°N 120.9°W – Hurricane Irwin weakens into a tropical storm about 925 mi (1,490 km) southwest of Cabo San Lucas, Baja California Sur.

October 10

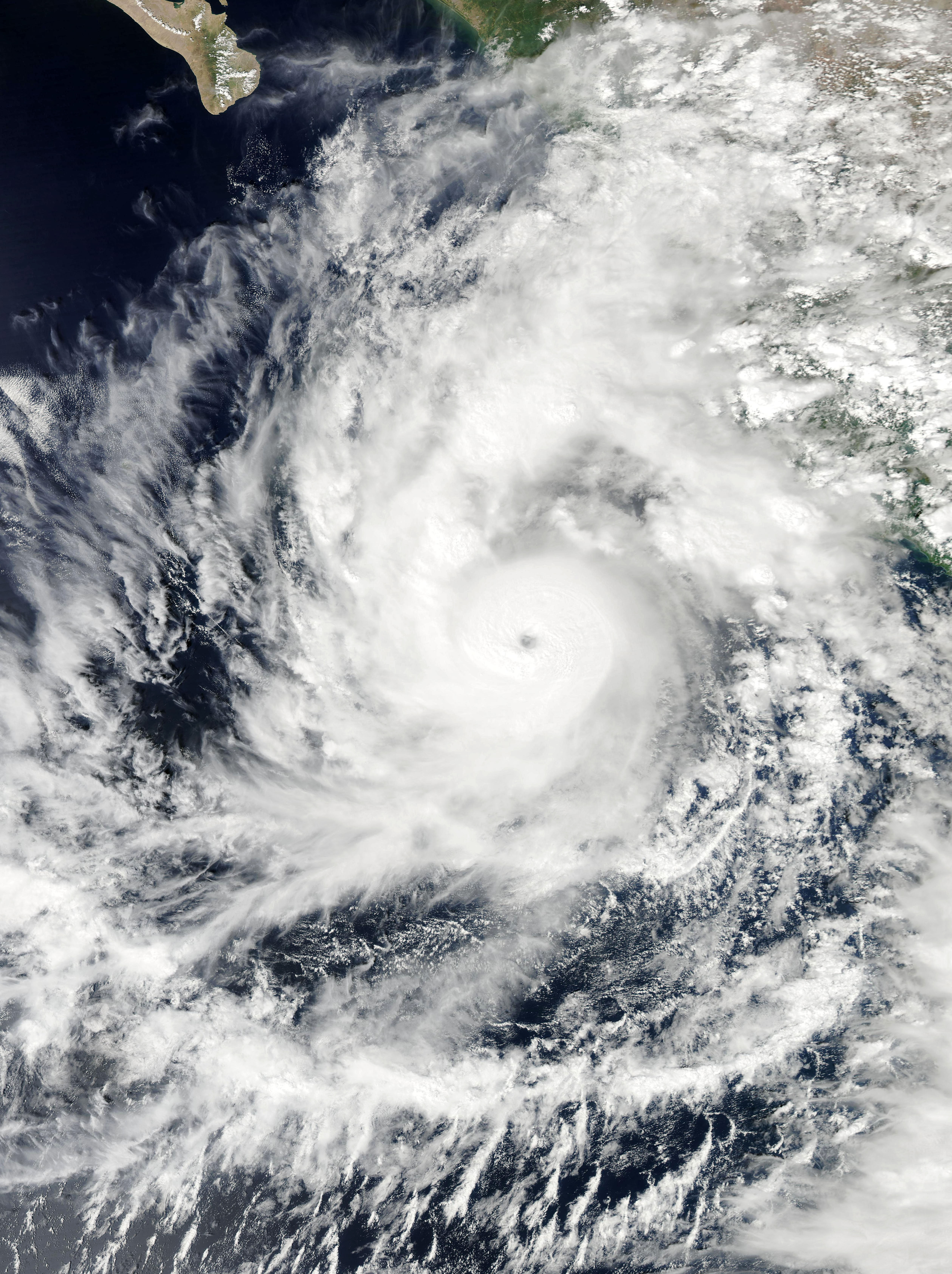
Satellite image of Hurricane Jova near peak intensity late on October 10

- 00:00 UTC (5:00 p.m. PDT, October 9) at 16.2°N 107.7°W – Hurricane Jova strengthens to Category 2 intensity about 300 mi (480 km) southwest of Manzanillo, Colima.
- 06:00 UTC (11:00 p.m. PDT, October 9) at 16.3°N 107.2°W – Hurricane Jova strengthens to Category 3 intensity about 270 mi (435 km) southwest of Manzanillo, Colima, making it the fifth major hurricane of the season.
- 18:00 UTC (11:00 a.m. PDT) at 16.5°N 106.5°W – Hurricane Jova attains peak winds of 125 mph (205 km/h) and a minimum barometric pressure of 955 mbar (28.20 inHg) about 230 mi (370 km) southwest of Manzanillo, Colima.

October 11

- 12:00 UTC (5:00 a.m. PDT) at 17.5°N 105.7°W – Hurricane Jova weakens to Category 2 intensity about 140 mi (220 km) southwest of Manzanillo, Colima.

October 12

- 00:00 UTC (5:00 p.m. PDT, October 11) at 13.9°N 93.8°W – Tropical Depression Twelve-E develops from an area of low pressure about 185 mi (295 km) south-southeast of Salina Cruz, Oaxaca; it simultaneously attains peak winds of 35 mph (55 km/h) and a minimum barometric pressure of 1,004 mbar (29.65 inHg).
- 06:00 UTC (11:00 p.m. PDT, October 11) at 19.6°N 105.1°W – Hurricane Jova makes landfall near El Tabaco, Jalisco, or about 40 mi (65 km) northwest of Barra de Navidad, Jalisco, with winds of 100 mph (155 km/h) and a barometric pressure of 975 mbar (28.79 inHg).
- 12:00 UTC (5:00 a.m. PDT) at 20.6°N 104.9°W – Hurricane Jova rapidly weakens into a tropical storm, skipping Category 1 status, inland about 100 mi (155 km) north of Barra de Navidad, Jalisco.
- 16:00 UTC (9:00 a.m. PDT) at 16.2°N 94.1°W – Tropical Depression Twelve-E makes landfall near Paredón, Chiapas, with winds of 35 mph (55 km/h) and a barometric pressure of 1,005 mbar (29.68 inHg).
- 18:00 UTC (11:00 a.m. PDT) at 21.3°N 104.5°W – Tropical Storm Jova weakens into a tropical depression inland about 145 mi (230 km) north of Barra de Navidad, Jalisco; it dissipates six hours later.

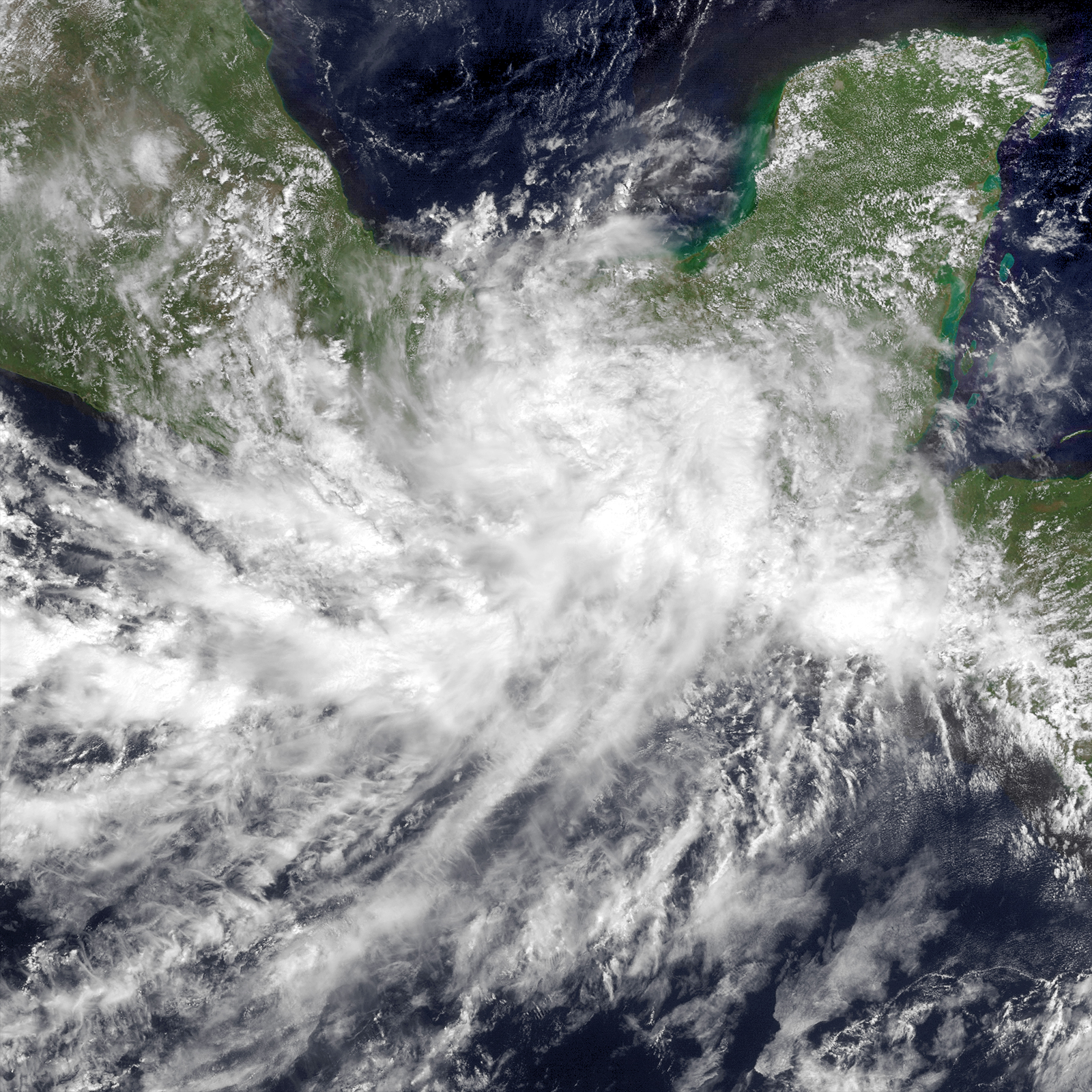
Satellite image of Tropical Depression Twelve-E just after landfall on October 12

October 13

- 00:00 UTC (5:00 p.m. PDT, October 12) at 17.4°N 108.9°W – Tropical Storm Irwin weakens into a tropical depression about 320 mi (520 km) west-southwest of Manzanillo, Colima.
- 00:00 UTC (5:00 p.m. PDT, October 12) at 16.9°N 93.9°W – Tropical Depression Twelve-E degenerates into a remnant low inland about 100 mi (155 km) east-northeast of Salina Cruz, Oaxaca.
- 18:00 UTC (11:00 a.m. PDT) at 19.0°N 106.8°W – Tropical Depression Irwin restrengthens into a tropical storm about 160 mi (260 km) west of Manzanillo, Colima.

October 15

- 18:00 UTC (11:00 a.m. PDT) at 15.8°N 106.7°W – Tropical Storm Irwin weakens back into a tropical depression about 275 mi (445 km) southwest of Manzanillo, Colima.

October 16

- 18:00 UTC (11:00 a.m. PDT) at 13.7°N 107.9°W – Tropical Depression Irwin degenerates into a remnant low about 435 mi (705 km) southwest of Manzanillo, Colima.

=== November ===
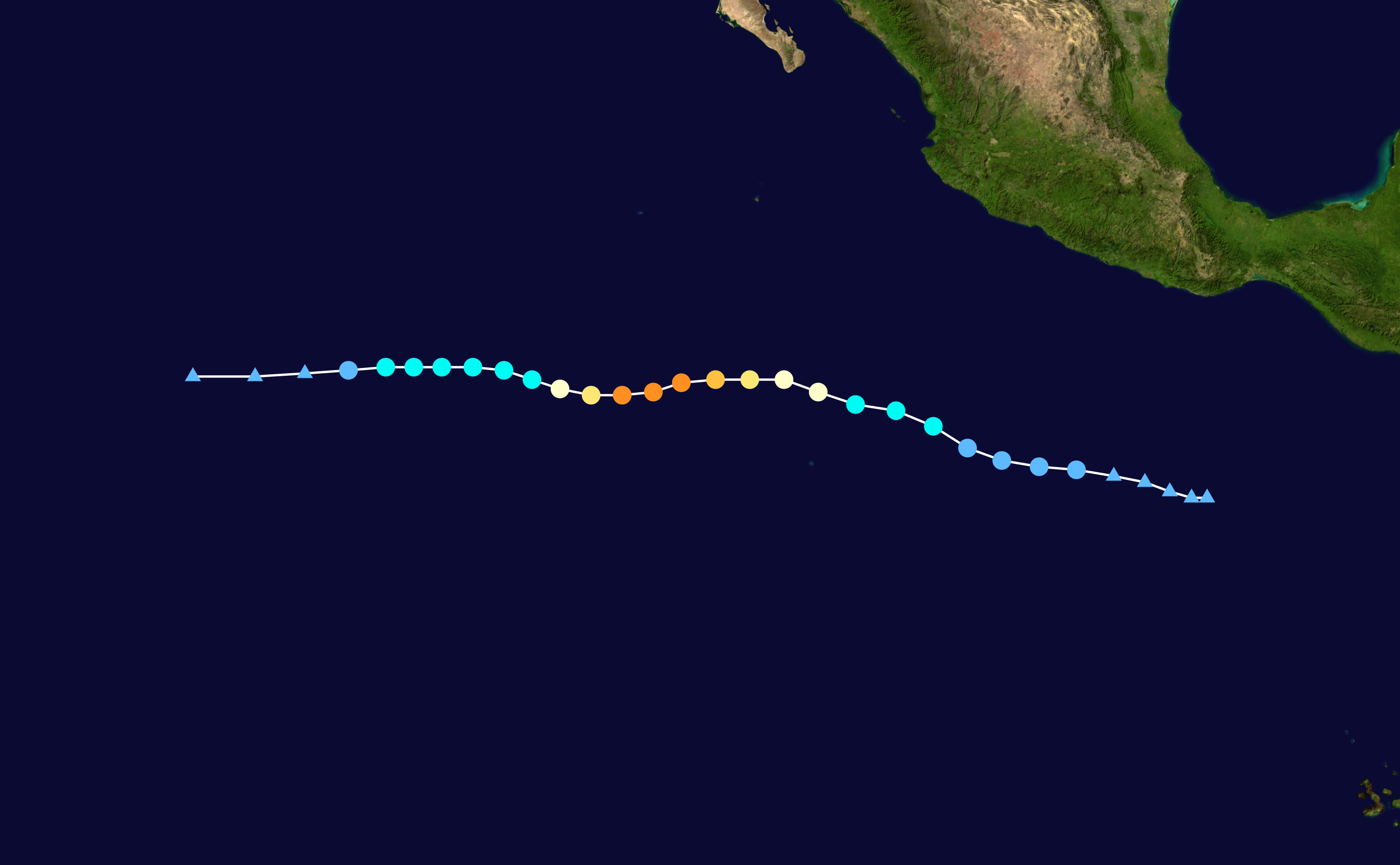
Track map of Hurricane Kenneth

November 19

- 18:00 UTC (10:00 a.m. PST) (Note: On November 6, daylight saving time ended in most areas of the basin, which resulted in the gap between UTC and local time widening by one hour. Hawaii was not affected; the state has not observed daylight saving time since 1945.) at 10.1°N 100.7°W – A tropical depression develops from an area of low pressure about 470 mi (760 km) south of Acapulco, Guerrero.

November 20

- 18:00 UTC (10:00 a.m. PST) at 11.5°N 105.3°W – The aforementioned tropical depression strengthens into Tropical Storm Kenneth about 520 mi (835 km) southwest of Acapulco, Guerrero.

November 21

- 12:00 UTC (4:00 a.m. PST) at 12.6°N 109.0°W – Tropical Storm Kenneth strengthens into a Category 1 hurricane about 450 mi (725 km) south-southeast of Socorro Island.

November 22

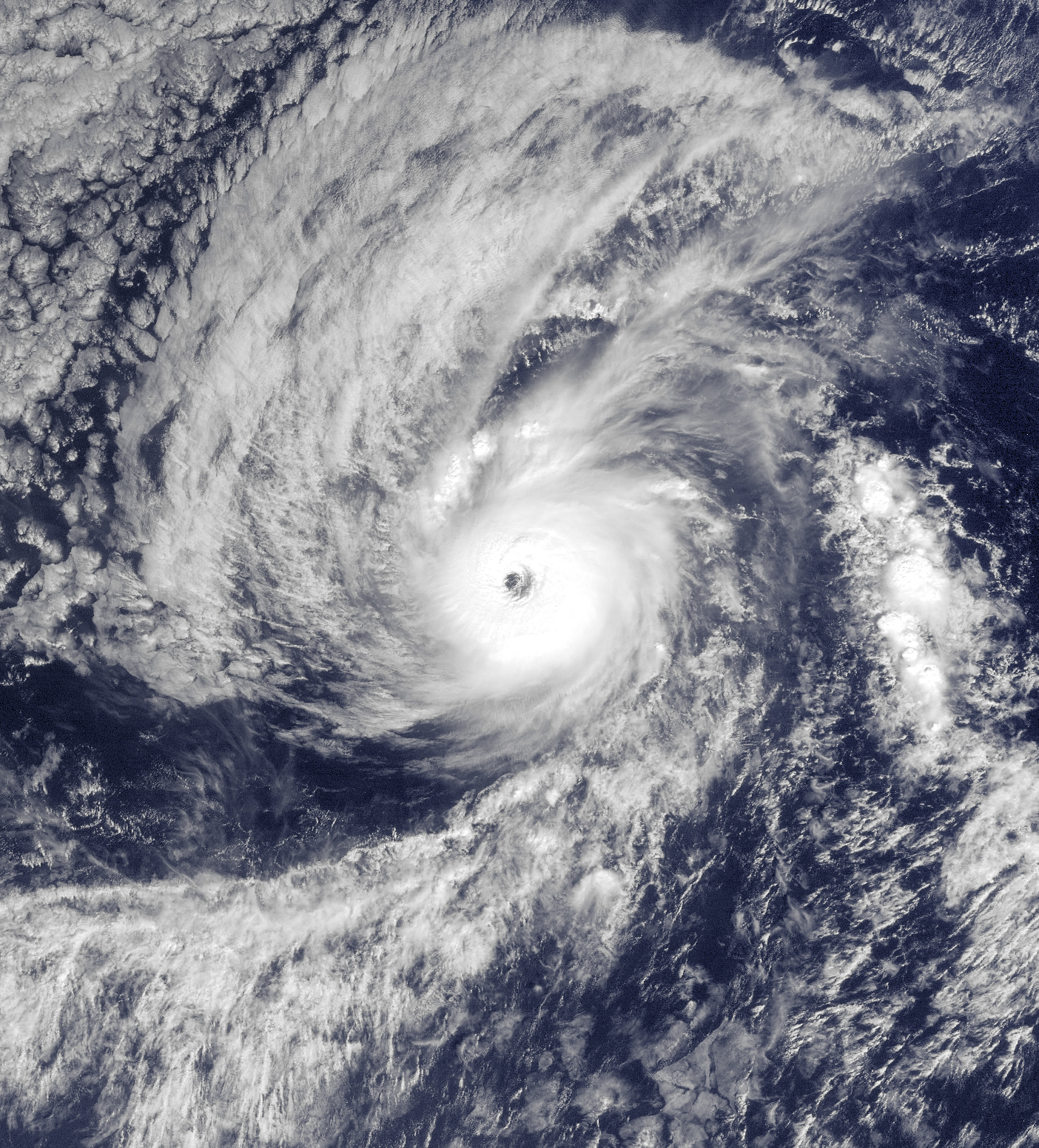
Satellite image of Hurricane Kenneth near peak intensity on November 22

- 00:00 UTC (4:00 p.m. PST, November 21) at 13.0°N 111.2°W – Hurricane Kenneth strengthens to Category 2 intensity about 395 mi (640 km) south of Socorro Island.
- 06:00 UTC (10:00 p.m. PST, November 21) at 13.0°N 112.3°W – Hurricane Kenneth strengthens to Category 3 intensity about 410 mi (660 km) south of Socorro Island, making it the sixth and final major hurricane of the season.
- 12:00 UTC (4:00 a.m. PST) at 12.9°N 113.4°W – Hurricane Kenneth strengthens to Category 4 intensity about 435 mi (705 km) south-southwest of Socorro Island; it simultaneously attains peak winds of 145 mph (230 km/h) and a minimum barometric pressure of 940 mbar (27.76 inHg).

November 23

- 06:00 UTC (10:00 p.m. PST, November 22) at 12.5°N 116.3°W – Hurricane Kenneth rapidly weakens to Category 2 intensity, skipping Category 3 status, about 420 mi (675 km) south-southwest of Clarion Island.
- 12:00 UTC (4:00 a.m. PST) at 12.7°N 117.3°W – Hurricane Kenneth weakens to Category 1 intensity about 425 mi (685 km) south-southwest of Clarion Island.
- 18:00 UTC (10:00 a.m. PST) at 13.0°N 118.2°W – Hurricane Kenneth weakens into a tropical storm about 435 mi (705 km) south-southwest of Clarion Island.

November 25

- 06:00 UTC (10:00 p.m. PST, November 24) at 13.3°N 124.1°W – Tropical Storm Kenneth weakens into a tropical depression about 715 mi (1,150 km) west-southwest of Clarion Island.
- 12:00 UTC (4:00 a.m. PST) at 13.2°N 125.5°W – Tropical Depression Kenneth degenerates into a remnant low about 800 mi (1,290 km) west-southwest of Clarion Island.

November 30

- The 2011 Pacific hurricane season officially ends.

== See also ==
- Pacific hurricane
- Timeline of the 2011 Atlantic hurricane season
