= Hurricane Dora (2011) =

Category 4 Pacific hurricane in 2011

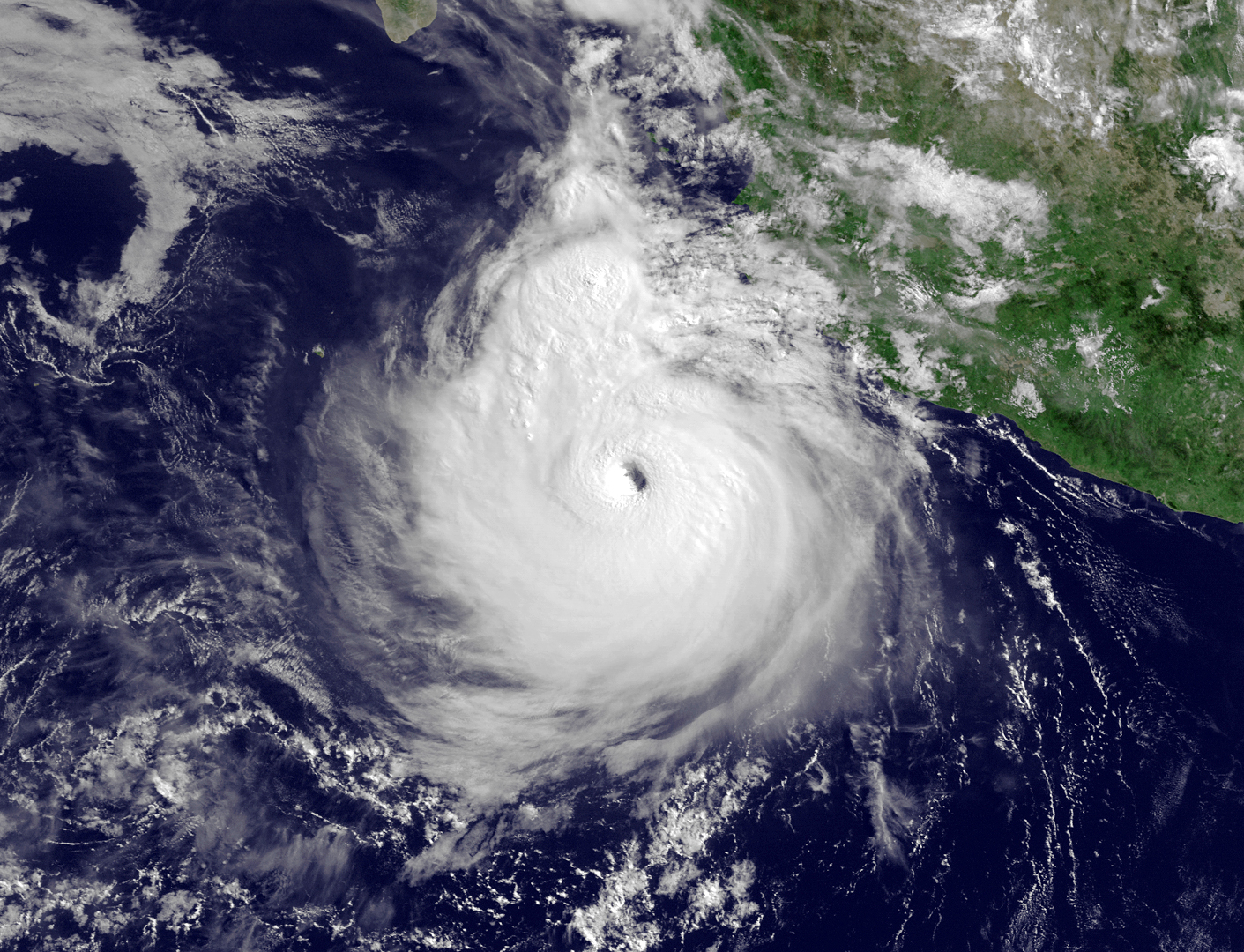
- Dora at peak intensity on July 21

Meteorological history
- Formed: July 18, 2011
- Remnant low: July 24, 2011
- Dissipated: July 26, 2011

Category 4 major hurricane
- 1-minute sustained (SSHWS/NWS)
- Highest winds: 155 mph (250 km/h)
- Lowest pressure: 929 mbar (hPa); 27.43 inHg

Overall effects
- Fatalities: None
- Damage: Minimal
- Areas affected: Southwestern Mexico, Baja California Peninsula, Southwestern United States
- IBTrACS /
- Part of the 2011 Pacific hurricane season

Hurricane Dora was a powerful tropical cyclone that brought minor impacts to Mexico and the United States in July of 2011, becoming the strongest hurricane in the northeastern Pacific of that year. The fourth named storm, fourth hurricane, and second major hurricane of the year, Dora developed from a tropical wave south of Honduras on July 18. (Note: For consistency, Coordinated Universal Time (UTC) is used throughout this article as the cyclone existed in multiple time zones.) Moving northwestward in favorable conditions, the system quickly intensified to tropical storm status and attained hurricane intensity the next day. Rapid intensification ensued shortly thereafter, bringing the storm to its peak intensity on July 21 as a Category 4 hurricane, with a minimum barometric pressure of 929 mbar (hPa; 27.43 inHg) and maximum sustained winds of 155 mph (250 km/h). However, the storm's path into an area with cool sea surface temperatures and wind shear caused Dora to quickly deteriorate and weaken. By July 24, Dora had degenerated into a remnant low-pressure area west of the Baja California Peninsula.

Dora brought stormy conditions to the southwestern Mexico coast and the Baja California Peninsula throughout its existence. Remaining off the coast from its formation to dissipation, Dora's effects on land were slight. However, the outer rainbands of the hurricane caused flooding and mudslides in southern Mexico and Guatemala, while rough surf toppled a lighthouse and damaged 60 restaurants along the coast. The hurricane's remnants contributed to heightened shower and thunderstorm activity across New Mexico and Arizona in late July.

== Meteorological history ==
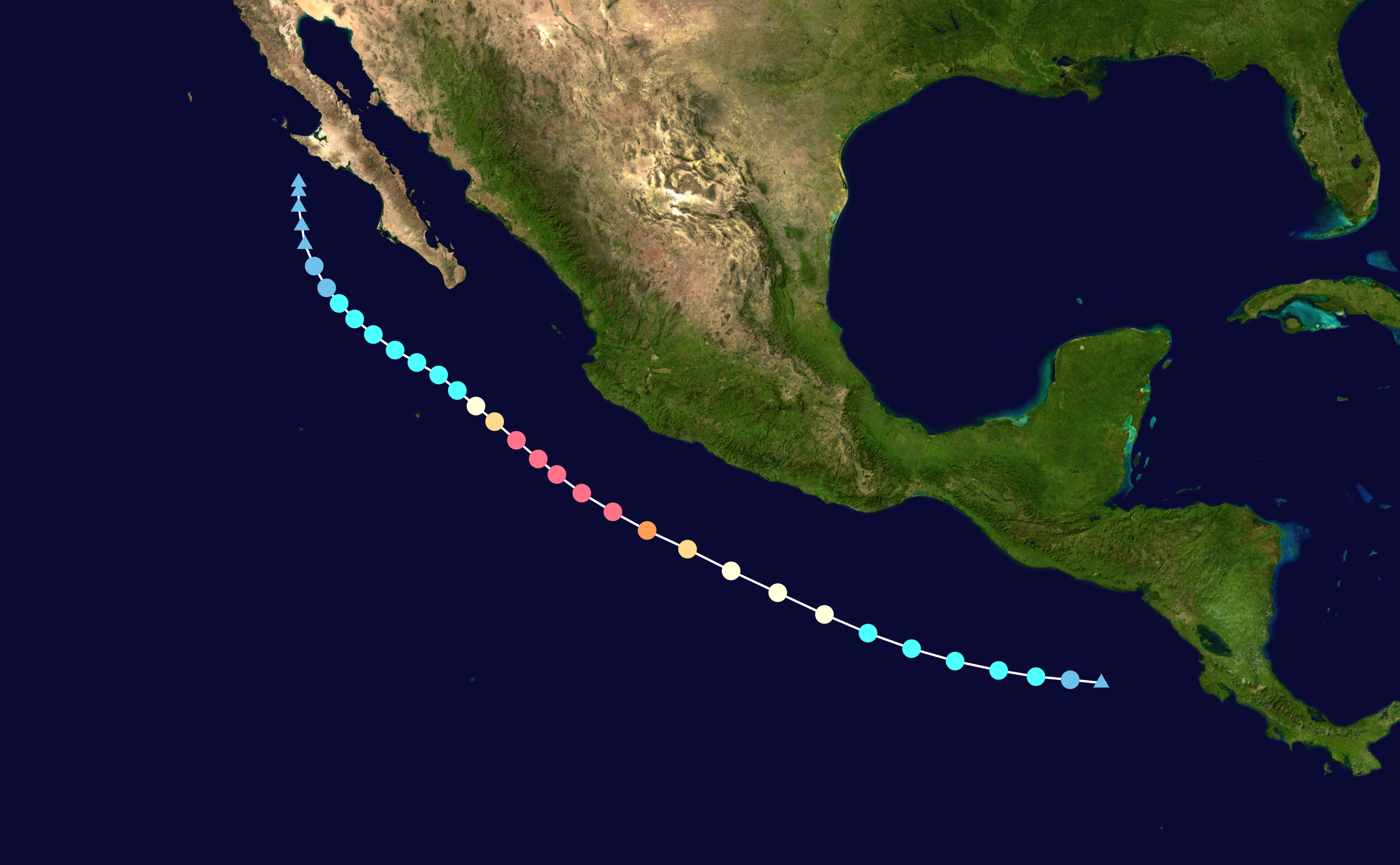
Map plotting the storm's track and intensity, according to the Saffir–Simpson scale Map key Saffir–Simpson scale Tropical depression (≤38 mph, ≤62 km/h) Tropical storm (39–73 mph, 63–118 km/h) Category 1 (74–95 mph, 119–153 km/h) Category 2 (96–110 mph, 154–177 km/h) Category 3 (111–129 mph, 178–208 km/h) Category 4 (130–156 mph, 209–251 km/h) Category 5 (≥157 mph, ≥252 km/h) Unknown Storm type Tropical cyclone Subtropical cyclone Extratropical cyclone, remnant low, tropical disturbance, or monsoon depression

The origins of Hurricane Dora can be traced back to a tropical wave that emerged off the western African coast on July 7. The disturbance tracked into the Caribbean Sea seven days later without any signs of development. However, the system encountered an enhanced flow of moisture in the southwestern Caribbean, allowing for organization and the formation of a broad low-pressure area on July 15. Upon tracking into the eastern Pacific, the National Hurricane Center (NHC) judged the storm to have had a low chance developing into a tropical cyclone. The next day, thunderstorm activity erupted around the system, and at 1500 UTC on July 18, the NHC declared the vigorous disturbance to have reached tropical depression status; in post-season analysis, the NHC found that Dora was already a tropical storm by this point after developing six hours earlier.

After development, Dora was steered towards the northwest by a ridge over the Southwestern United States. Situated in an area of favorable atmospheric conditions and warm sea surface temperatures, the tropical cyclone quickly strengthened, developing an intermittent eye before being classified as a hurricane at 1800 UTC on July 19. At the time, the storm was roughly 245 mi (400 km) south-southwest of Puerto Escondido, Oaxaca. Upon reaching hurricane status, Dora began an episode of rapid intensification as its inner structure became more well-defined and its eye more permanent. At the same time, mesovorticies within the eye—often indicators of intense tropical cyclones—were noted on satellite imagery. By 1800 UTC on July 20, Dora had attained the threshold for major hurricane status. After acquiring some characteristics of an annular hurricane early on July 21, Dora reached its peak intensity at 1200 UTC that day with a minimum barometric pressure of 929 mbar (hPa; 27.43 inHg) and maximum sustained winds of 155 mph (250 km/h), making it a high-end Category 4 on the Saffir–Simpson hurricane wind scale.

Dora held its peak strength for just six hours before it began to weaken due to cooler waters and the presence of wind shear. Although the hurricane's initial weakening phase was gradual, the overall structure of Dora quickly deteriorated in response to increasingly hostile wind shear around the storm. The storm's eye abruptly dissipated less than 12 hours after Dora's peak intensity, By 1800 UTC on July 22, the tropical cyclone had weakened to tropical storm intensity, undergoing an 80 mph (130 km/h) decrease in winds in just 24 hours. Continued weakening prompted the NHC to downgrade Dora to a tropical depression two days later at 1200 UTC as the system curved west of the Baja California Peninsula. Twelve hours later, the system degenerated into a remnant low pressure area devoid of any thunderstorm activity. The low persisted for a day as it tracked north-northwestward, eventually dissipating 70 mi (110 km) south-southwest of Bahía Asunción on July 26.

== Preparations and impact ==
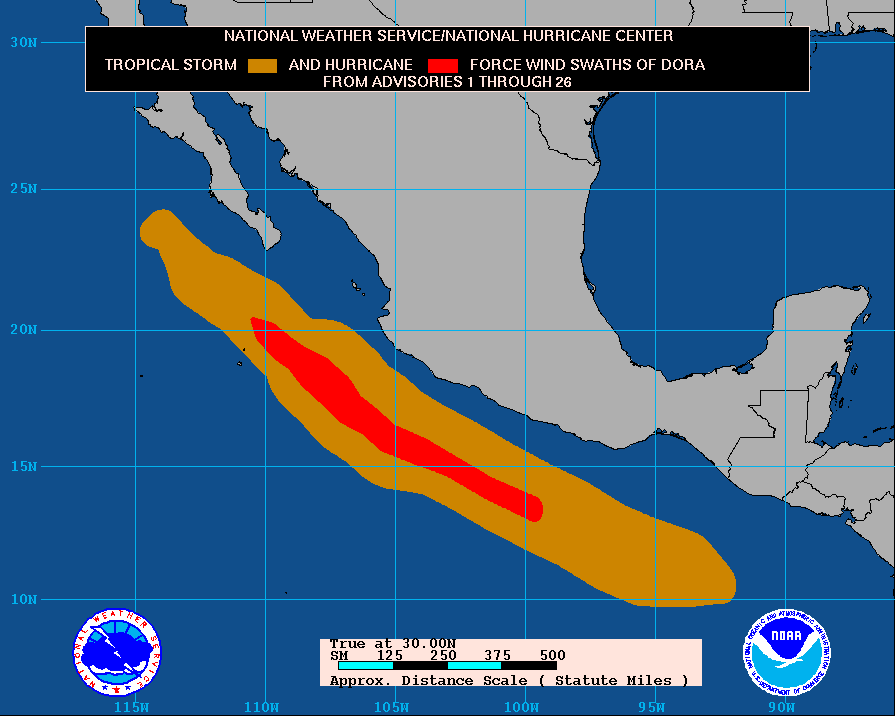
Hurricane and tropical storm-force wind swaths during Dora's existence

On July 20, the Government of Mexico issued a tropical storm watch for a portion of the southwestern Mexico coast from Lázaro Cárdenas, Michoacán to Cabo Corrientes, Jalisco; this watch remained posted until the early hours of July 21. Several hours later, another tropical storm watch was issued for coastal areas of the Baja California Peninsula from Agua Blanca to Buenavista, and was later upgraded to a tropical storm warning as Dora neared the coast. However, the warning was lifted after the hurricane weakened and moved away from land. In Guerrero, the threat of flooding prompted the state government to prepare 900 shelters, while boaters were ordered to exercise caution due to rough seas generated by the nearby tropical cyclone.

The outer rainbands of the tropical cyclone caused flooding in the states of Chiapas, Guerrero, and Chiapas, resulting in some damage. Several mudslides in southern Mexico and Guatemala were attributed to these rains. Off the Mexican coast, waves from Dora peaked at 13 ft (4.0 m). These high waves toppled a lighthouse roughly 35 mi (56 km) east of Acapulco and also damaged or swept away 60 thatch-roofed restaurants around La Penitas and La Bocana. After passing southwestern Mexico, Dora was expected to track near the Baja California Peninsula, forcing port authorities in Los Cabos Municipality to suspend boat tours and other tourist services. Four elementary schools were converted into emergency shelters in preparation for potential flooding. Residual moisture from Dora enhanced the monsoonal flow over Arizona and New Mexico, producing showers across the region.

== See also ==
- Timeline of the 2011 Pacific hurricane season
- Other storms of the same name
- List of Category 4 Pacific hurricanes
