= 1992 Pacific typhoon season =

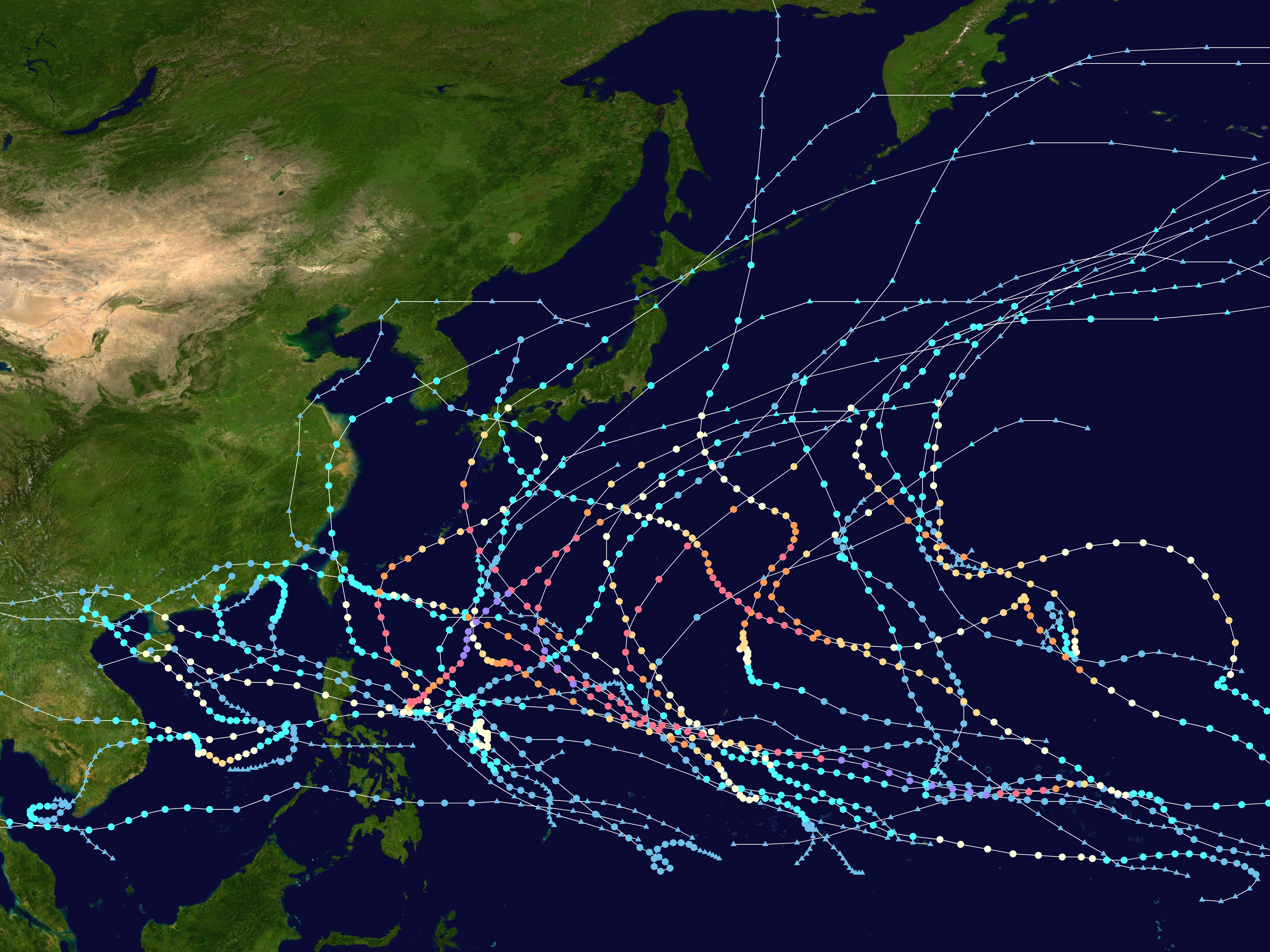
- Season summary map

Seasonal boundaries
- First system formed: January 4, 1992
- Last system dissipated: November 29, 1992

Strongest storm
- Name: Gay
  - Maximum winds: 205 km/h (125 mph) (10-minute sustained)
  - Lowest pressure: 900 hPa (mbar)

Seasonal statistics
- Total depressions: 40
- Total storms: 31
- Typhoons: 16
- Very strong typhoons: 12
- Violent typhoons: 1
- ACE: 470.1 units (third highest)
- Total fatalities: 431 total
- Total damage: $3.38 billion (1992 USD)

Related articles
- 1992 Atlantic hurricane season; 1992 Pacific hurricane season; 1992 North Indian Ocean cyclone season

The 1992 Pacific typhoon season was the fifth consecutive above-average season, producing 31 tropical storms, 16 typhoons and five super typhoons. It had no official bounds; it ran year-round in 1992. Despite this, most tropical cyclones tend to form in the northwestern Pacific Ocean between June and November. These dates conventionally delimit the period of each year when most tropical cyclones form in the northwestern Pacific Ocean.

In the West Pacific basin, tropical depressions have the "W" suffix added to their number. Storms reaching tropical storm intensity of 34 kn (63 km/h) sustained winds were assigned a name by the Joint Typhoon Warning Center (JTWC). Storms with sustained winds exceeding 64 knots (119 km/h) are called typhoons, while intense typhoons with sustained winds exceeding 130 knots (240 km/h) are designated super typhoons by the JTWC (see tropical cyclone scales).

Furthermore, tropical depressions that enter or form in the Philippine Area of Responsibility are assigned an internal name by the Philippine Atmospheric, Geophysical and Astronomical Services Administration (PAGASA). This can often result in the same storm having two names.

== Season summary ==
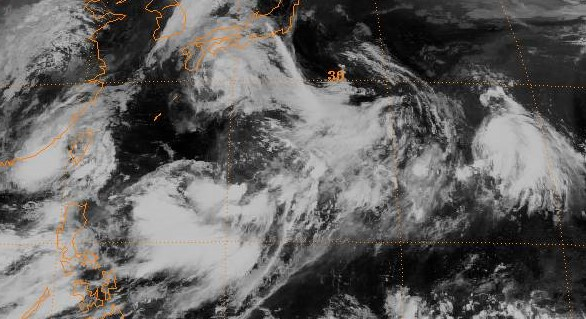
Tropical Storm Kent making landfall in Kyushu, along with Lois, Mark and Nina (as either tropical storms or tropical depressions) on August 18

Most intense Pacific typhoon seasons
Rank	Seasons	ACE value
1	1997	570.4
2	2004	480.6
3	1992	470.1
4	2015	462.9
5	1994	454.6
6	1958	445.8
7	1957	440.2
8	1965	436.2
9	1962	423
10	1996	416.5

There were a total of 40 tropical cyclones in the Western Pacific in 1992. 39 of these formed within the basin, and 1 storm, Tropical Storm Ekeka, formed in the Central Pacific basin, crossing the Date Line to enter the Western Pacific. Out of the 39, 32 became named tropical storms, 21 reached typhoon intensity, and 5 reached super typhoon strength. Storms are listed in numerical ascending order by their JTWC tropical depression numbers except for Ekeka, and not in alphabetical order of names. Thus, Tropical Storm Zack (22W) is listed before Super Typhoon Yvette (23W).

The season was hyperactive, featuring the highest Accumulated Cyclone Energy (ACE) for a Pacific typhoon season on record at the time, until it was surpassed by the 1997 Pacific typhoon season. The ACE index for the 1992 Pacific typhoon season as calculated by Colorado State University using data from the Joint Typhoon Warning Center was 470.1 units. Broadly speaking, ACE is a measure of the power of a tropical or subtropical storm multiplied by the length of time it existed. It is only calculated for full advisories on specific tropical and subtropical systems reaching or exceeding wind speeds of 39 miles per hour (63 km/h).

== Systems ==
=== Severe Tropical Storm Axel ===
- Severe tropical storm (JMA)
- Category 1 typhoon (SSHWS)
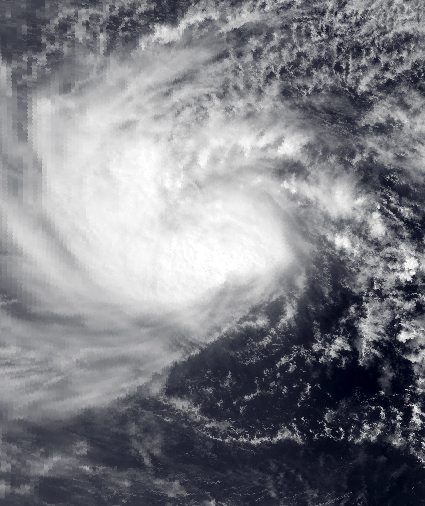
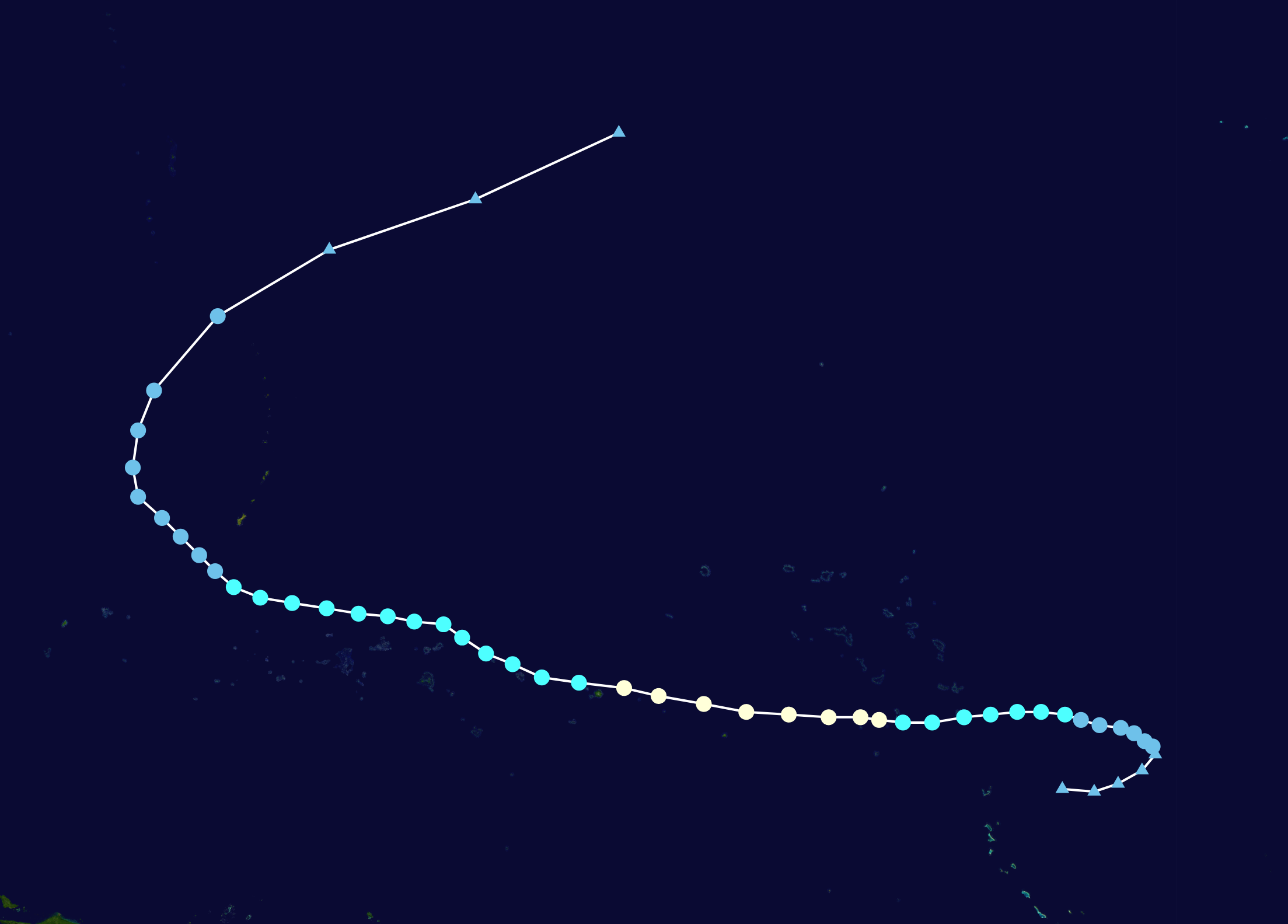
- Duration: 4 January – 15 January
- Peak intensity: 100 km/h (65 mph) (10-min); 980 hPa (mbar)

On 2 January, stronger-than-normal low-level westerlies were observed east of New Guinea. As a result of these increased winds and an area of cloudiness, two areas of convection on different sides of the equator formed. The next day, these areas began consolidating. As a result, on 4 January, the Japan Meteorological Agency (JMA) noted that the northern area of convection had developed into a tropical depression. Several hours later, the Joint Typhoon Warning Center (JTWC) issued a Tropical Cyclone Formation Alert (TCFA) on the depression, issuing their first warning on Tropical Depression 01W later that day. Early on 6 January, both the JTWC and JMA had noted that the tropical depression had intensified into a tropical storm, causing the former agency to name it Axel.

As a result of favorable upper-level divergence, Axel was able to significantly intensify, with the JMA noting that the cyclone had developed into a severe tropical storm the next day. Despite the JMA stating that Axel did not develop further until 9 January, later that day, the JTWC noted that Axel had intensified into a typhoon. Soon after, they noted that Axel had peaked with 1-minute sustained winds of 65 mph (100 km/h) while the JMA stated that Axel had peaked with 10-minute sustained winds of 80 mph (130 km/h). However, on 10 January, Axel tracked into an environment with high wind shear, causing it to weaken. As a result, three days later, both the JMA and JTWC noted that Axel had weakened into a tropical depression. Two days later, Axel had transitioned into a weak extratropical low, causing both agencies to stop tracking it.

The worst typhoon to affect the Marshall Islands in over 70 years, waves produced by Axel flooded homes and cars while gusts amounting to 100 mph (160 km/h) destroyed scores of houses, submerging houses and cars in knee-deep water and leaving hundreds homeless. After passing Majuro, Axel passed across Jaluit Atoll, causing over four feet of water to cover most of the main islands. As a result of Axel's winds, a majority of the outhouses were destroyed, resulting in serious health concerns for the islanders. In the eastern Caroline Islands, Kosrae experienced gusts of 75–90 mph (120–150 km/h) resulting in severe crop losses, damaged fauna, and several structures being destroyed.As Axel passed just north of Pohnpei, the island's electrical power was knocked out for several hours and many buildings in low-lying areas flooded. In those islands, a storm surge of fifteen feet was recorded, with a daily total of 9.73 in (247 mm) of rain seen.

=== Severe Tropical Storm Ekeka ===
- Severe tropical storm (JMA)
- Tropical storm (SSHWS)
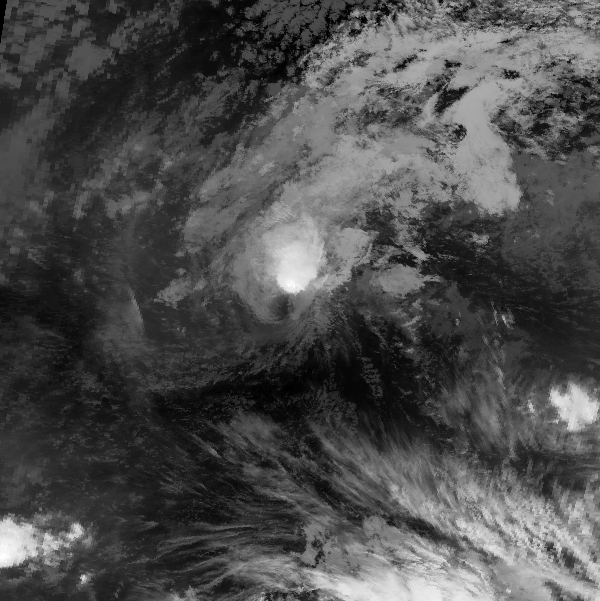
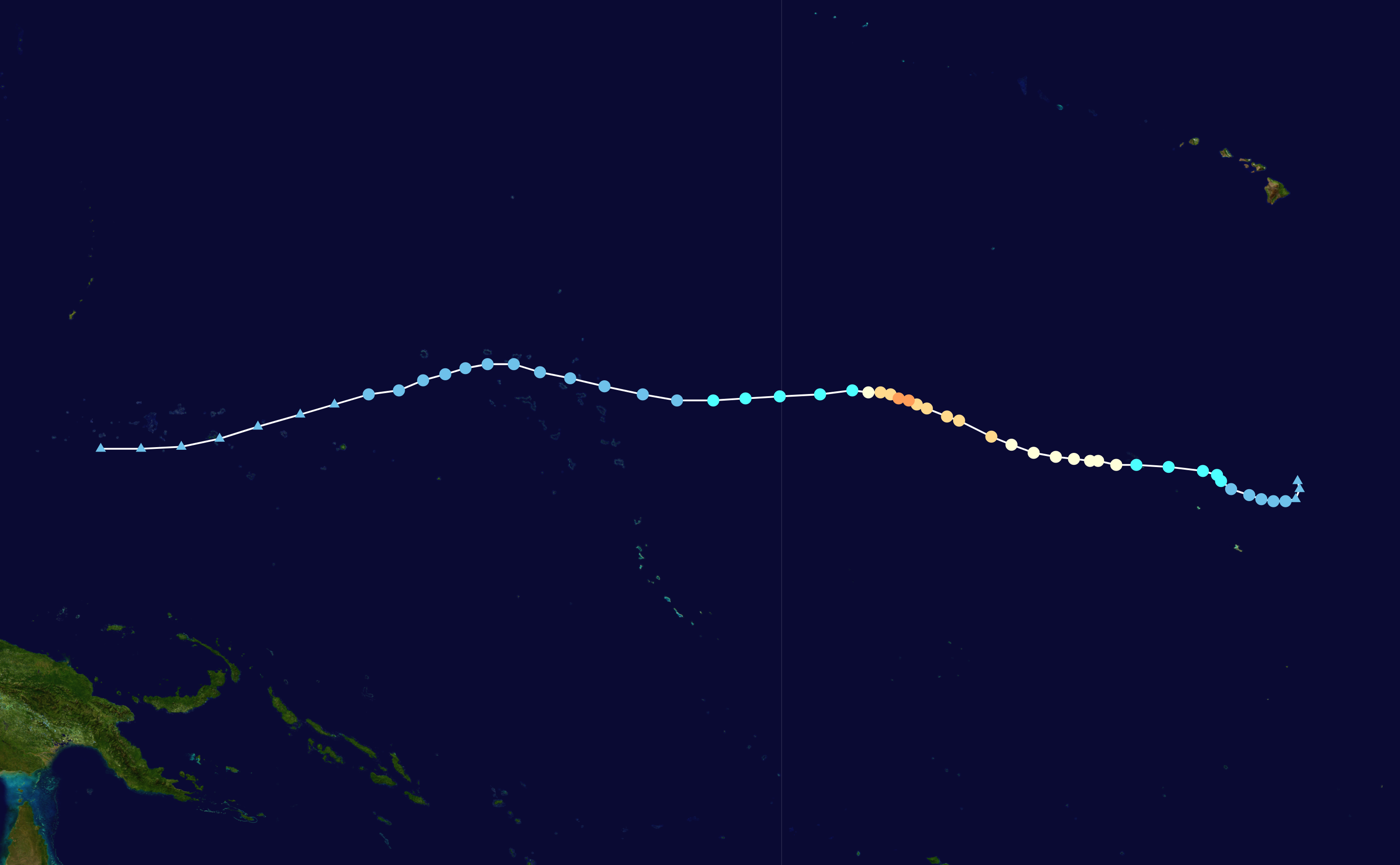
- Duration: 3 February – 8 February (Entered basin)
- Peak intensity: 95 km/h (60 mph) (10-min); 985 hPa (mbar)

On 3 February, a weakening Tropical Storm Ekeka tracked west of the International Date Line, entering the West Pacific basin and being monitored by the JMA. Early the next day, the JTWC began issuing bulletins on Ekeka, which was in an environment with high wind shear. Later that same day, Ekeka weakened into a tropical depression, and subsequently moved through the Marshall Islands. Several days later, on 8 February, the JMA stopped tracking the depression. The JTWC kept tracking Ekeka for a few hours until it passed over Chuuk. Early on February 9, Ekeka finally dissipated about 800 miles (1,300 km) east-southeast of Palau, or about 310 miles (500 km) off the north coast of Papua New Guinea.

=== Typhoon Bobbie (Asiang) ===
- Very strong typhoon (JMA)
- Category 4 typhoon (SSHWS)
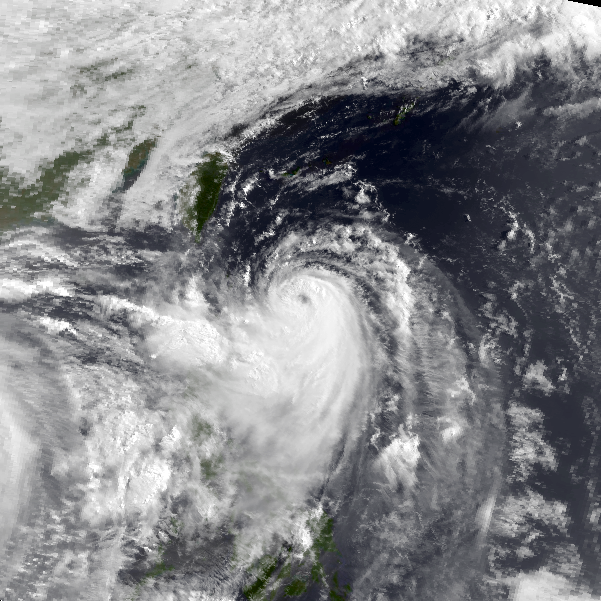
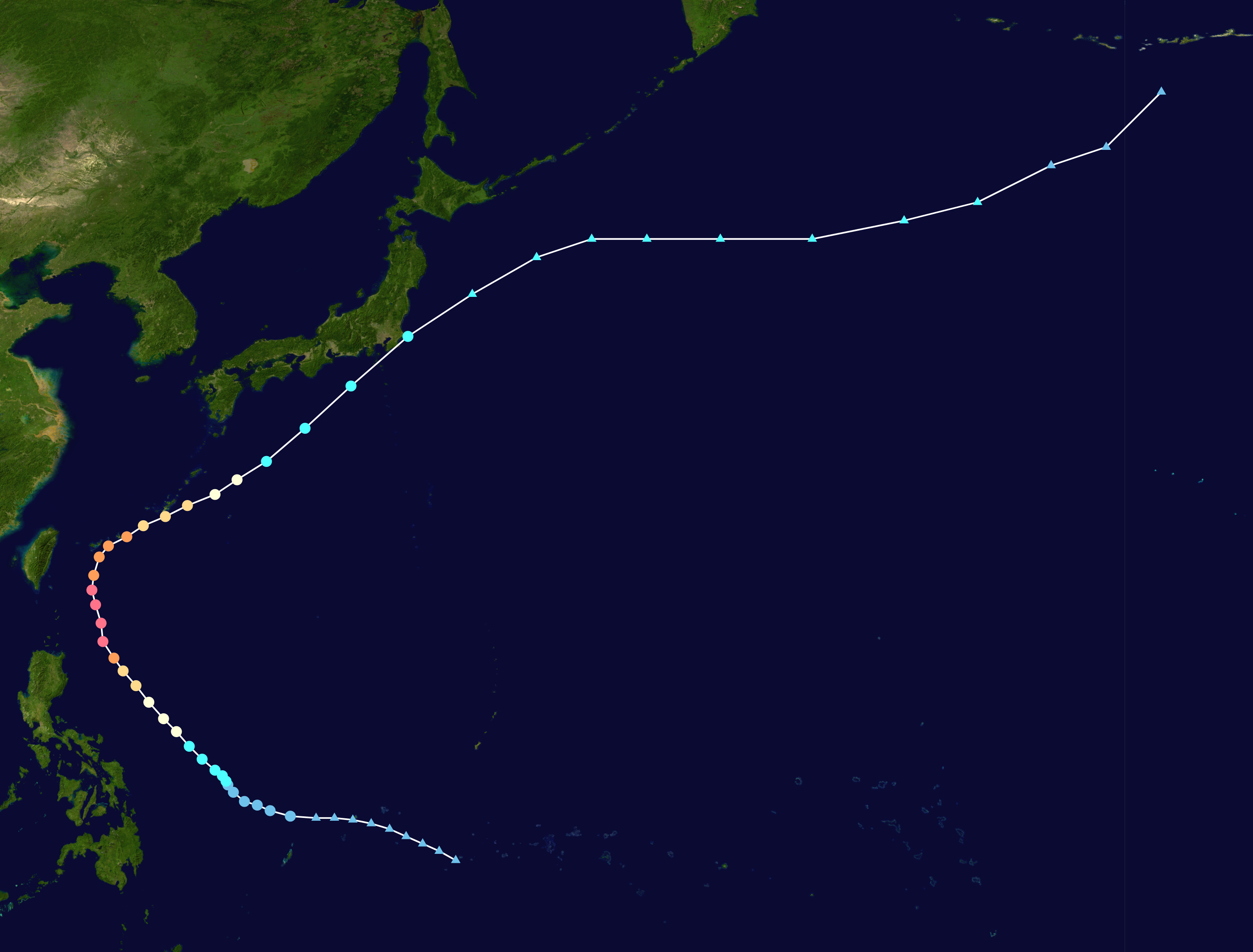
- Duration: 21 June – 30 June
- Peak intensity: 165 km/h (105 mph) (10-min); 940 hPa (mbar)

On 20 June, a poorly organized area of convection south of Guam near the central Caroline Islands began developing. Embedded in the monsoon trough, the disturbance's circulation began consolidating, prompting the JTWC to issue a TCFA on the disturbance. As a result, on 23 June, the JMA noted that the disturbance had developed into a tropical depression. Around that time, the JTWC also upgraded the disturbance into a depression, issuing their first warning on Tropical Depression 02W later that day. Intensifying, early on 24 June, both the JTWC and JMA noted Bobbie intensified into a tropical storm, causing the latter agency to name it Bobbie. Just a few hours later, Bobbie began undergoing a binary interaction with nearby Tropical Storm Chuck, which at the time, just formed off the Philippines. As Bobbie was intensifying, it crossed into the Philippine Area of Responsibility (PAR), prompting the Philippine Atmospheric, Geophysical, and Astronomical Services Administration (PAGSA) to name it Asiang.

Early the next day, Bobbie intensified into a severe tropical storm. At that time, the JTWC claimed that Bobbie had intensified into a typhoon, while the JMA noted that Bobbie had actually become a typhoon several hours later. On 18:00 UTC on 26 June, Bobbie peaked with 1-minute sustained winds of 140 mph (220 km/h) as it tracked the western extent of the mid-level subtropical ridge. Several hours later, Bobbie peaked with 10-minute sustained winds of 105 mph (165 km/h). As Bobbie began recurving east of Taiwan at 12:00 UTC that day, increasing southwesterly winds caused Bobbie to steadily weaken. Passing over Miyako Jima on 28 June and then just southeast of Okinawa on 29 June, Bobbie began undergoing an extratropical transition on at that time. At that time, Bobbie weakened into a severe tropical storm as it left the PAR, causing PAGASA to stop issuing advisories on the storm. As Bobbie transitioned into an extratropical storm, the JTWC issued their final warning on the system the next day, prior to it brushing the southern tip of Honshu. The JMA noted that Bobbie became extratropical early the next day, prior to it dissipating on 3 July.

Bobbie would primarily bring beneficial rainfall to Luzon, as mostly light showers had persevered over the region. However, combined with the effects of nearby Chuck, heavy rainfall would produce mudflows pouring down the Bucao, Balinquero and Maraunot rivers, causing them to rise up 6 ft (1.8 m). In Manila, 23 homes were destroyed while 2 people went missing. In Japan, Bobbie primarily brought severe rainfall, causing the prefectures of Okinawa, Miyazaki, Kagoshima, Tokyo, Gifu, and Fukui to receive heavy rainfall. Yakushima received 178 mm (7.0 in) in a day.

=== Typhoon Chuck ===
- Typhoon (JMA)
- Category 1 typhoon (SSHWS)
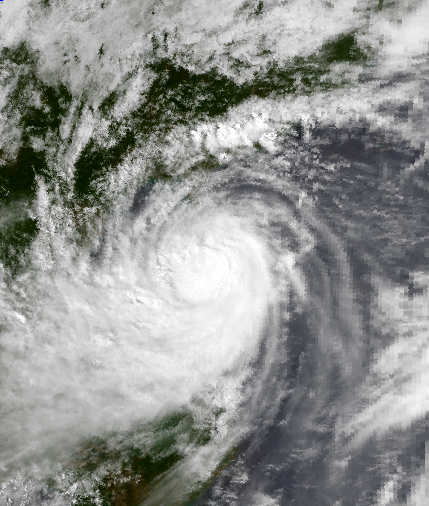
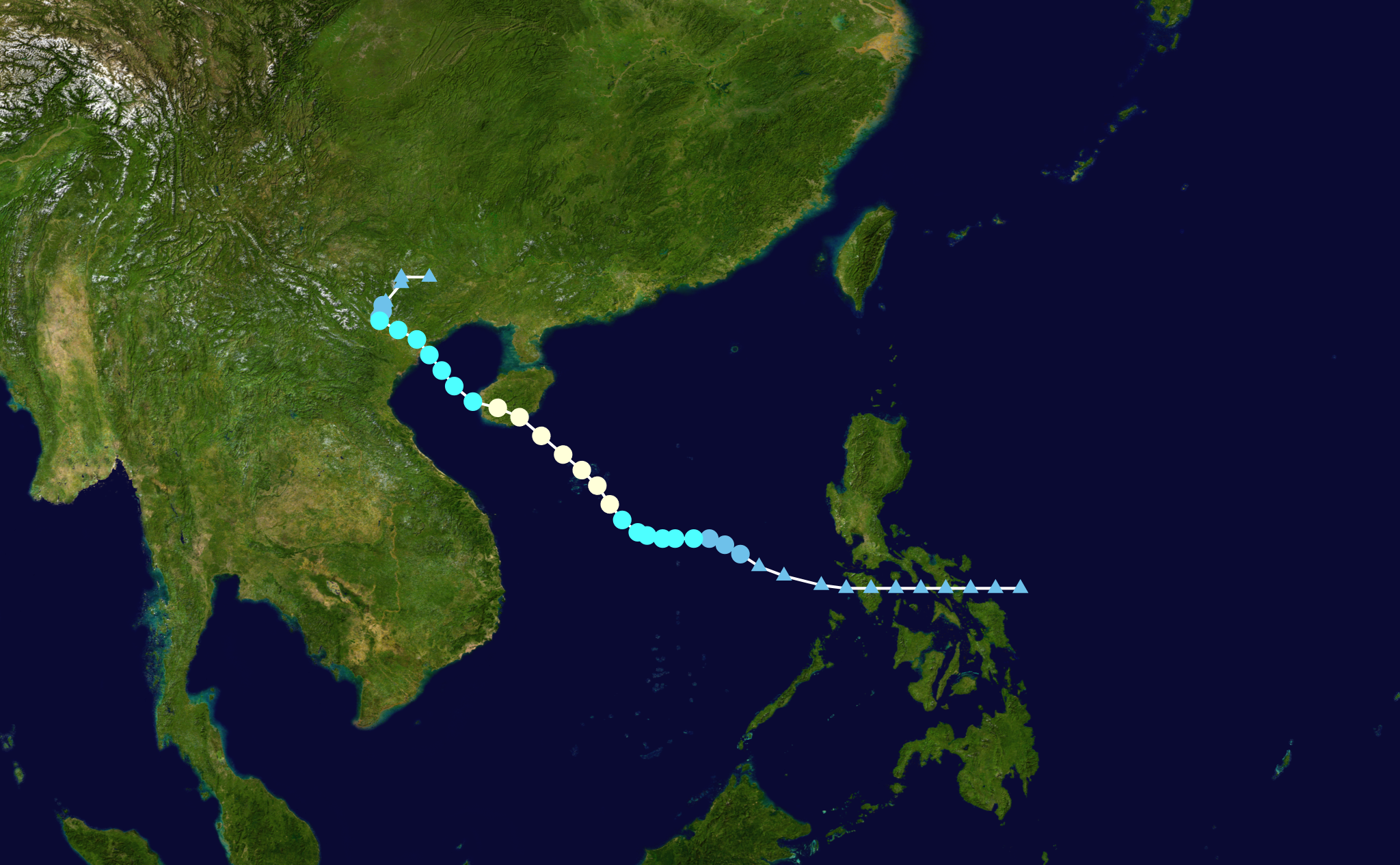
- Duration: 24 June – 2 July
- Peak intensity: 130 km/h (80 mph) (10-min); 965 hPa (mbar)

On 19:00 UTC on 21 June, a tropical disturbance began developing over the central Philippines. Initially weakening as it traversed the Philippines, once it crossed into the South China Sea two days later, the convection of the disturbance began organizing. As a result, on 24 June, the JMA noted that the disturbance had developed into a tropical depression. As it kept consolidating, the JTWC issued a TCFA on the disturbance later that day, issuing their first warning on it the next day as Tropical Depression 03W. Several hours later, the JMA noted that Chuck had intensified into a tropical storm, causing the JTWC to name it Chuck around 12 hours later.

Steadily intensifying, on 27 June, both the JTWC and JMA noted that Chuck had become a typhoon. As a result, the JMA stated that Chuck peaked with 10-minute sustained winds of 80 mph (130 km/h) around that time. Just a few hours later, early on 28 June, the JTWC stated that Chuck peaked with 1-minute sustained winds of 90 mph (150 km/h). Later that day, Chuck made landfall along the southern tip of Hainan island as a minimal typhoon. Weakening into a tropical storm as it crossed into the Gulf of Tonkin, Chuck made its second landfall around 100 mi (160 km) east-southeast of Hanoi early on 29 June. As a result of this, Chuck rapidly weakened, causing the JTWC to stop tracking it on 1 July. The JMA kept tracking Chuck until it dissipated two days later.

In Vietnam, at least 21 people died and while 80 were reported missing. Intense winds uprooted over 500 trees, downed electrical cables and damaged about 140 houses in Hanoi. As a result of the storm, in the capital alone, three people were killed while another three were injured. Massive waves engulfed several coastal fishing villages in Cát Hải district, with seven people being missing there. Elsewhere, in Hainan, one person died. In the Philippines, combined with the effects of nearby Bobbie, heavy rainfall would produce mudflows in the Philippines. These poured down the Bucao, Balinquero and Maraunot rivers, causing them to rise up 6 ft (1.8 m). Economic losses in Hainan are estimated at 223 million RMB (US$40.5 million).

=== Tropical Storm Deanna (Biring) ===
- Tropical storm (SSHWS)
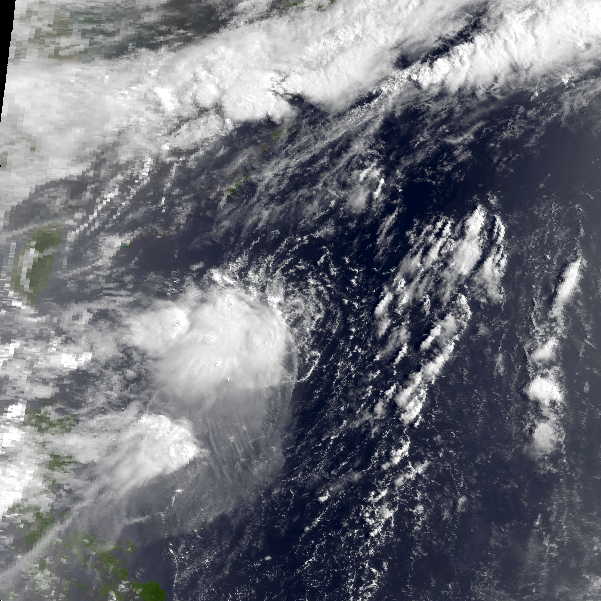
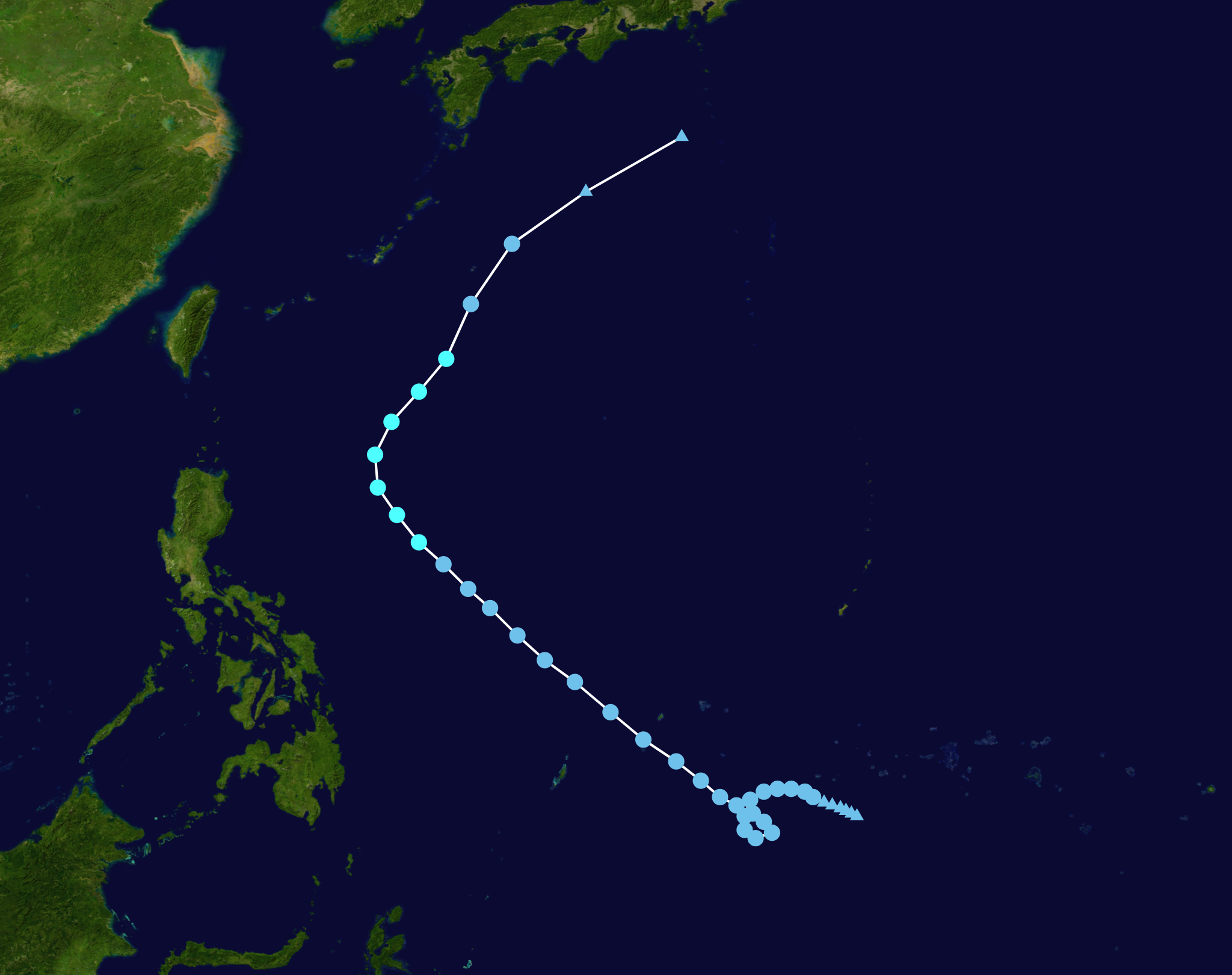
- Duration: 26 June – 3 July
- Peak intensity: 75 km/h (45 mph) (1-min); 994 hPa (mbar)

On 25 June, the Joint Typhoon Warning Center (JTWC) began tracking a tropical disturbance over the open Pacific. On 6:00 UTC the next day, they issued a TCFA on the consolidating system, later issuing their first advisory on it just a few hours later as Tropical Depression 04W. Initially, the depression was slow to consolidate due to wind shear produced by a nearby Typhoon Bobby alongside a tropical upper tropospheric trough (TUTT). This hindered much development of the depression's convection, causing it to not intensify into a tropical storm until 1 July. As a result of it becoming a tropical storm, the JTWC named it Deanna. Slowly developing, the next day, Deanna peaked with 1-minute sustained winds of 45 mph (75 km/h). Accelerating towards the northeast, Deanna weakened into a depression around 700 km (380 NM) east-northeast of Okinawa. As Deanna tracked northwards, it dissipated on 3 July. Despite that, the remnants of Dianna tracked towards Japan, prior to becoming extratropical the next day.

In the Philippines, Deanna, known there as Biring, would prompt PAGASA to issue PSWS #1 for Batanes and Cagayan. Additionally, the remnants of Deanna produced moderate to heavy rainfall in the Ryukyu Islands and Southern Japan.

=== Typhoon Eli (Konsing) ===
- Typhoon (JMA)
- Category 1 typhoon (SSHWS)
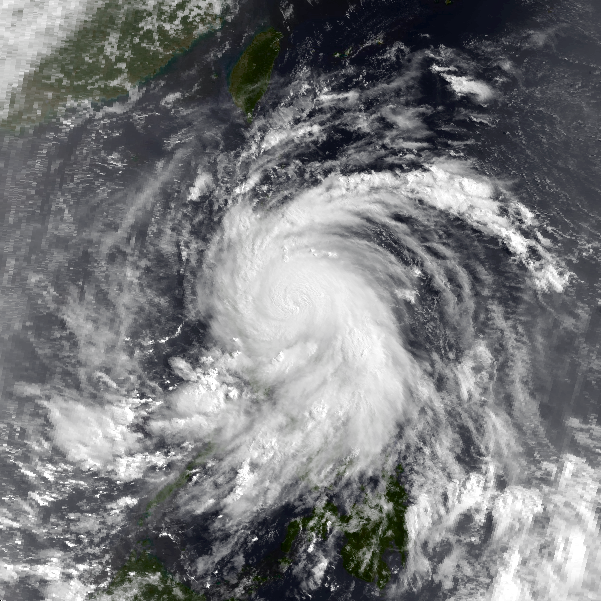
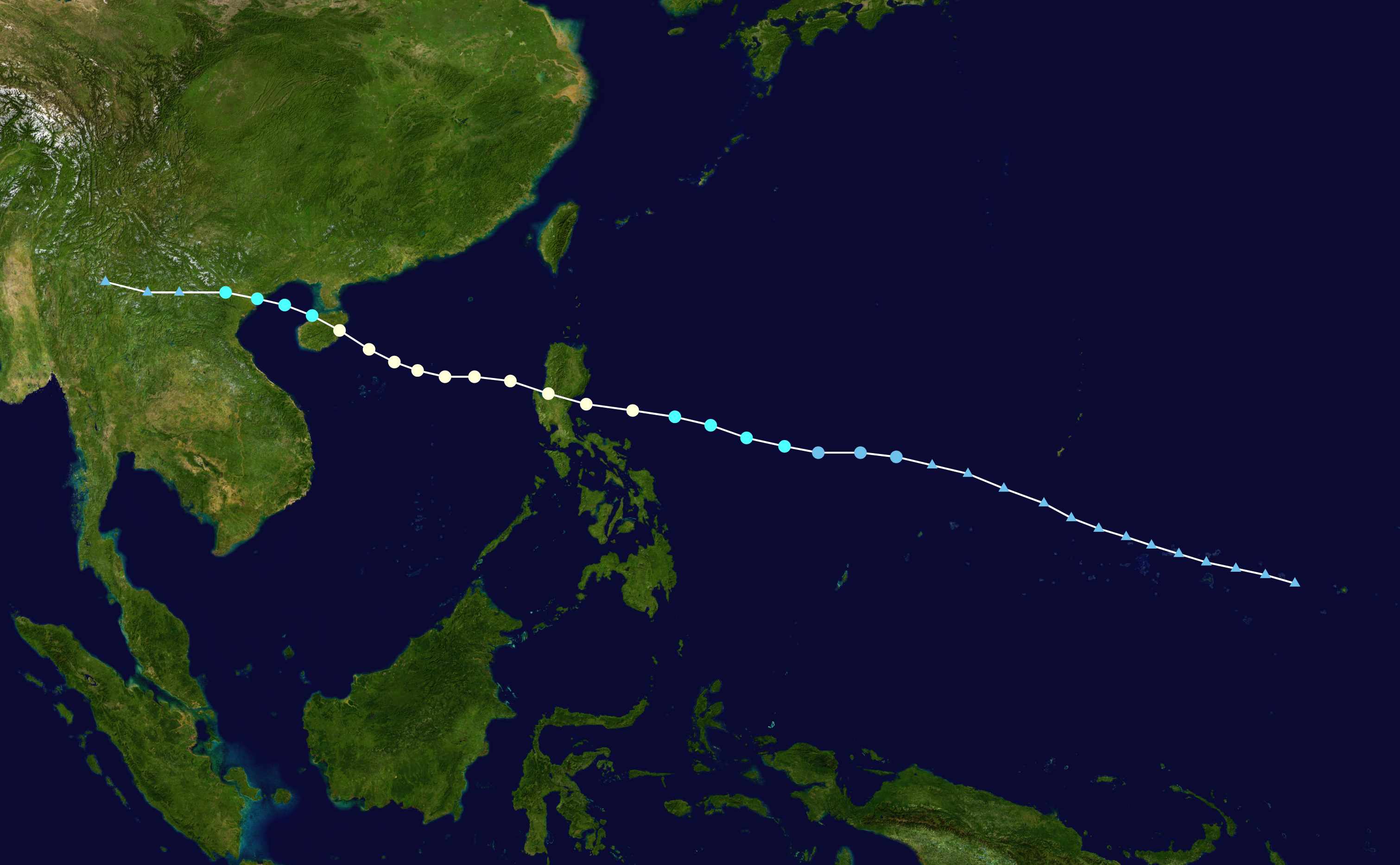
- Duration: July 8 – July 14
- Peak intensity: 130 km/h (80 mph) (10-min); 965 hPa (mbar)

One person was killed and eight others were reported missing when the storm moved through the Philippines. Extensive damage took place in China with losses amounting to $235 million.

=== Tropical Storm Faye ===
- Tropical storm (JMA)
- Tropical storm (SSHWS)
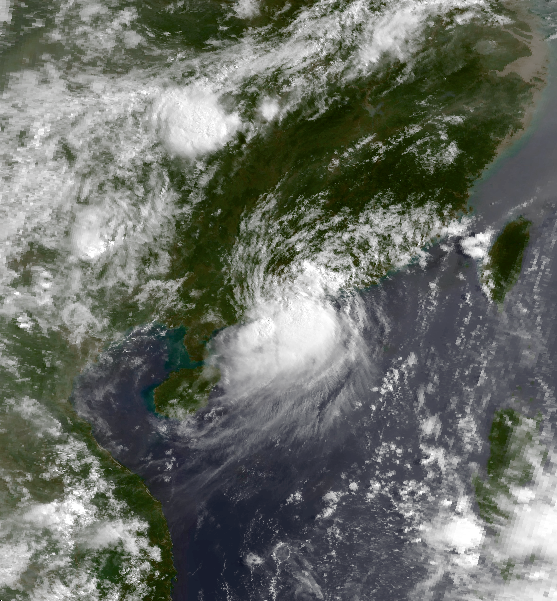
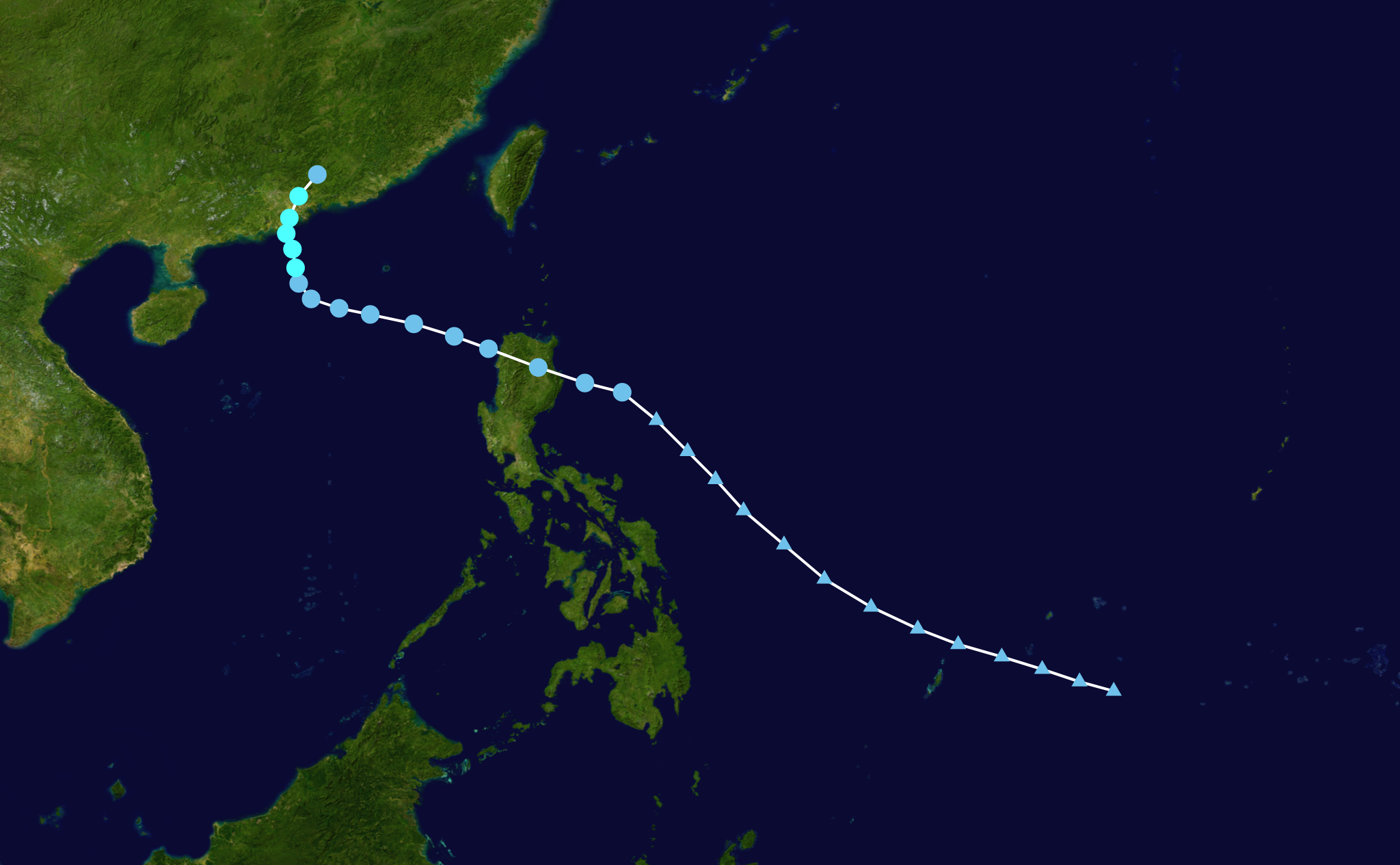
- Duration: July 15 – July 18
- Peak intensity: 65 km/h (40 mph) (10-min); 1000 hPa (mbar)

Two people were killed in Hong Kong. Agricultural losses were estimated to be at HK$8 million (US$1.03 million).

=== Typhoon Gary (Ditang) ===
- Severe tropical storm (JMA)
- Category 1 typhoon (SSHWS)
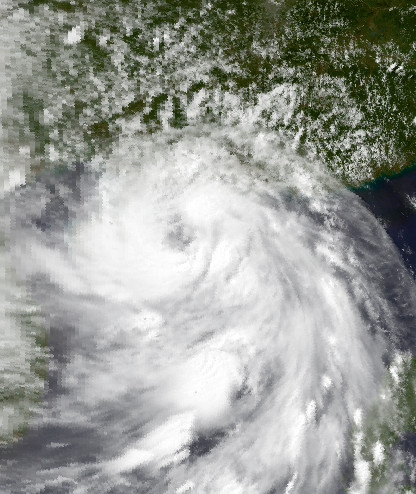
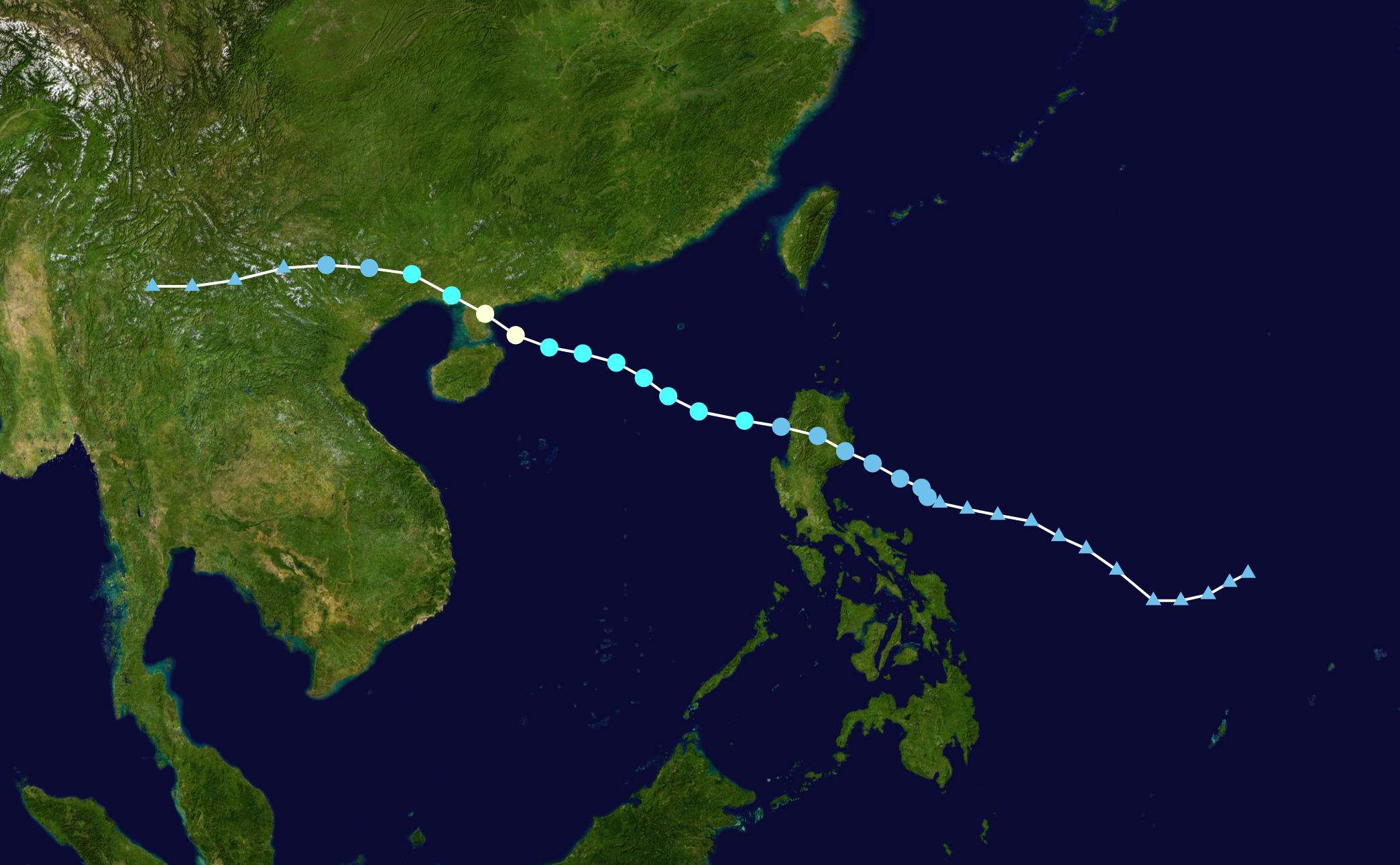
- Duration: July 17 – July 24
- Peak intensity: 100 km/h (65 mph) (10-min); 980 hPa (mbar)

At least 48 people were killed by Gary. Extensive damage took place in China with losses reaching $940 million.

=== Tropical Storm Helen ===
- Tropical storm (JMA)
- Tropical storm (SSHWS)
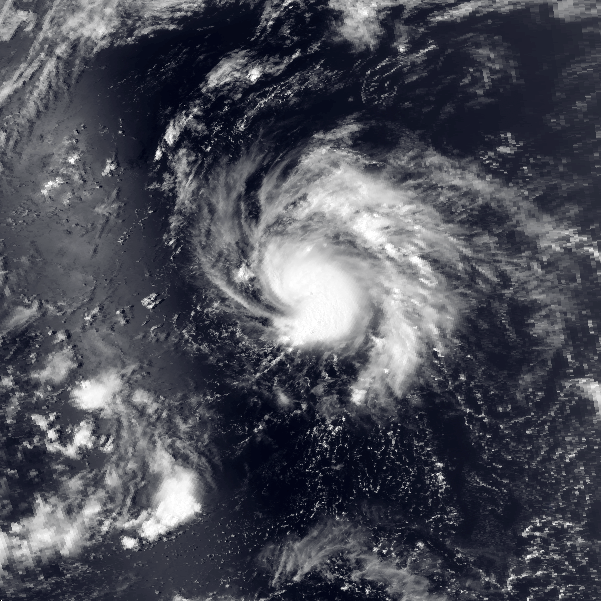
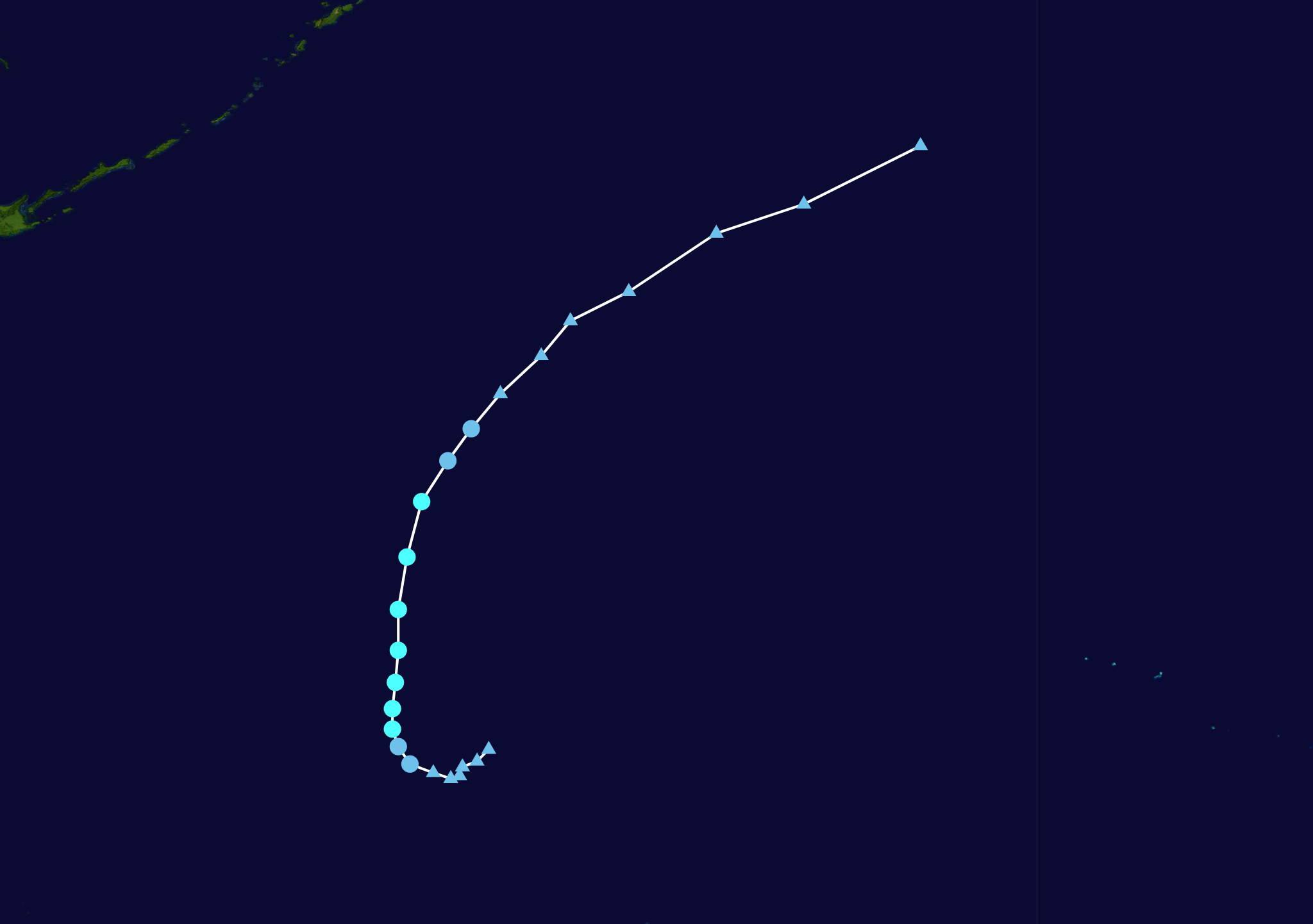
- Duration: July 26 – July 28
- Peak intensity: 75 km/h (45 mph) (10-min); 996 hPa (mbar)

Helen moved north away from land.

=== Typhoon Irving (Edeng) ===
- Severe tropical storm (JMA)
- Category 1 typhoon (SSHWS)
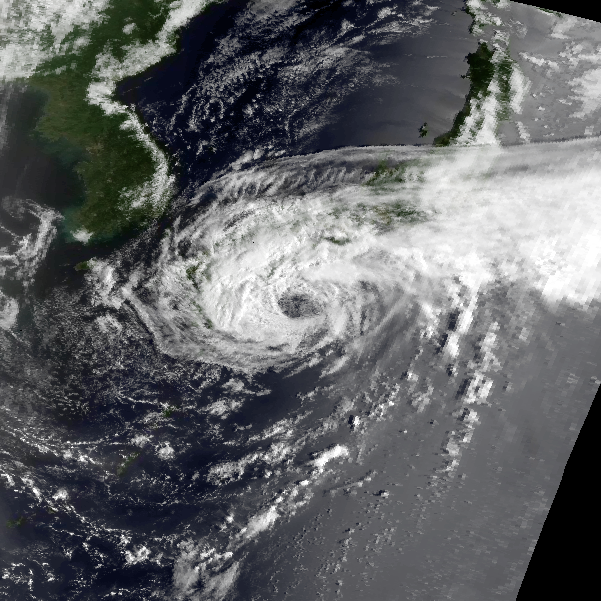
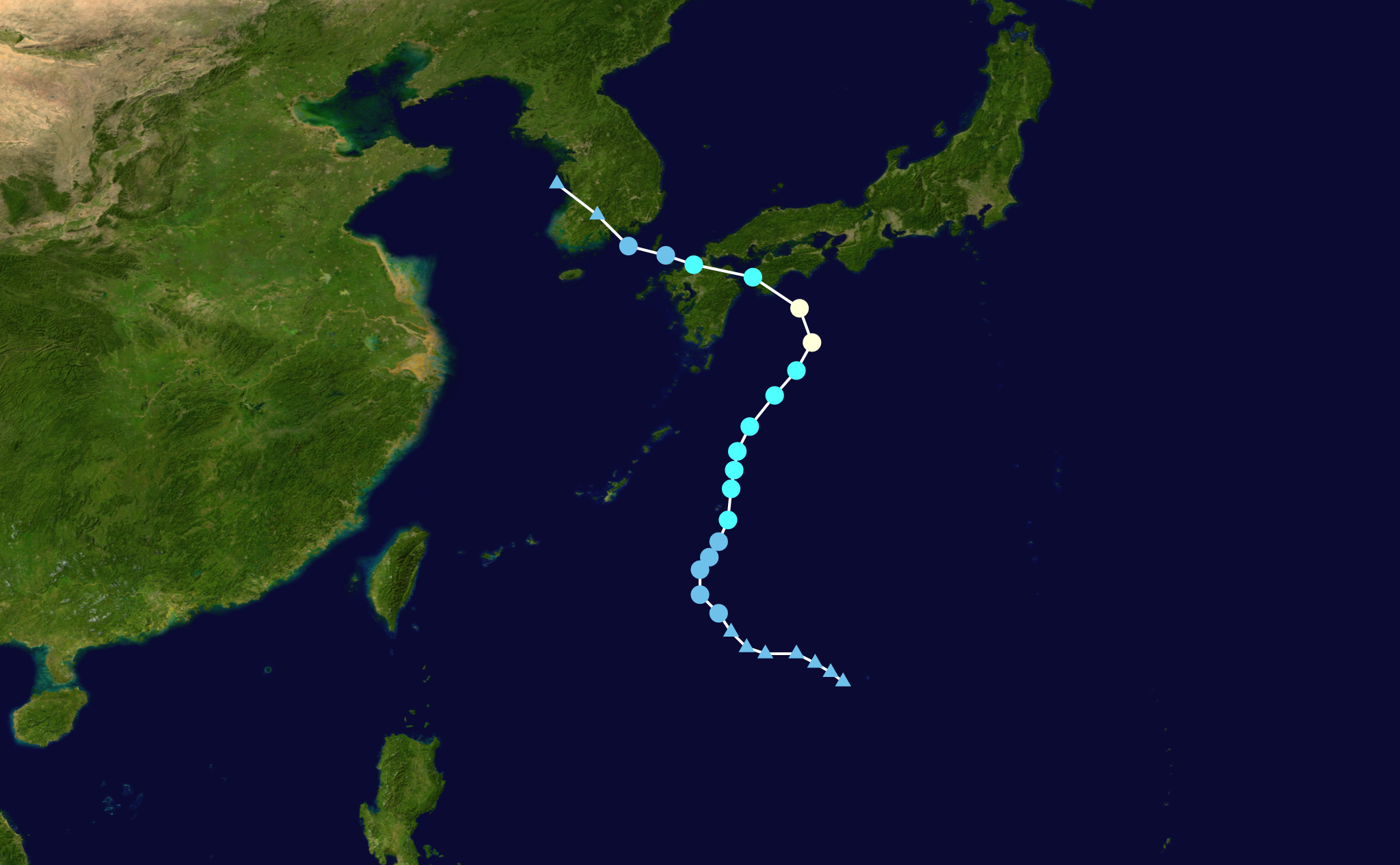
- Duration: July 31 – August 5
- Peak intensity: 100 km/h (65 mph) (10-min); 980 hPa (mbar)

Typhoon Irving caused over $4 million in damages and 3 fatalities. The storm formed south of Japan and moved north. Then, it recurved west and moved towards South Korea and dissipated.

=== Typhoon Janis (Gloring) ===
- Very strong typhoon (JMA)
- Category 4 typhoon (SSHWS)
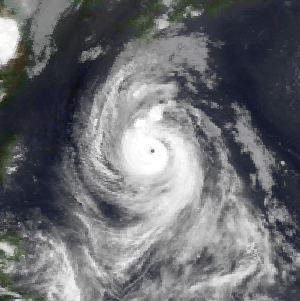
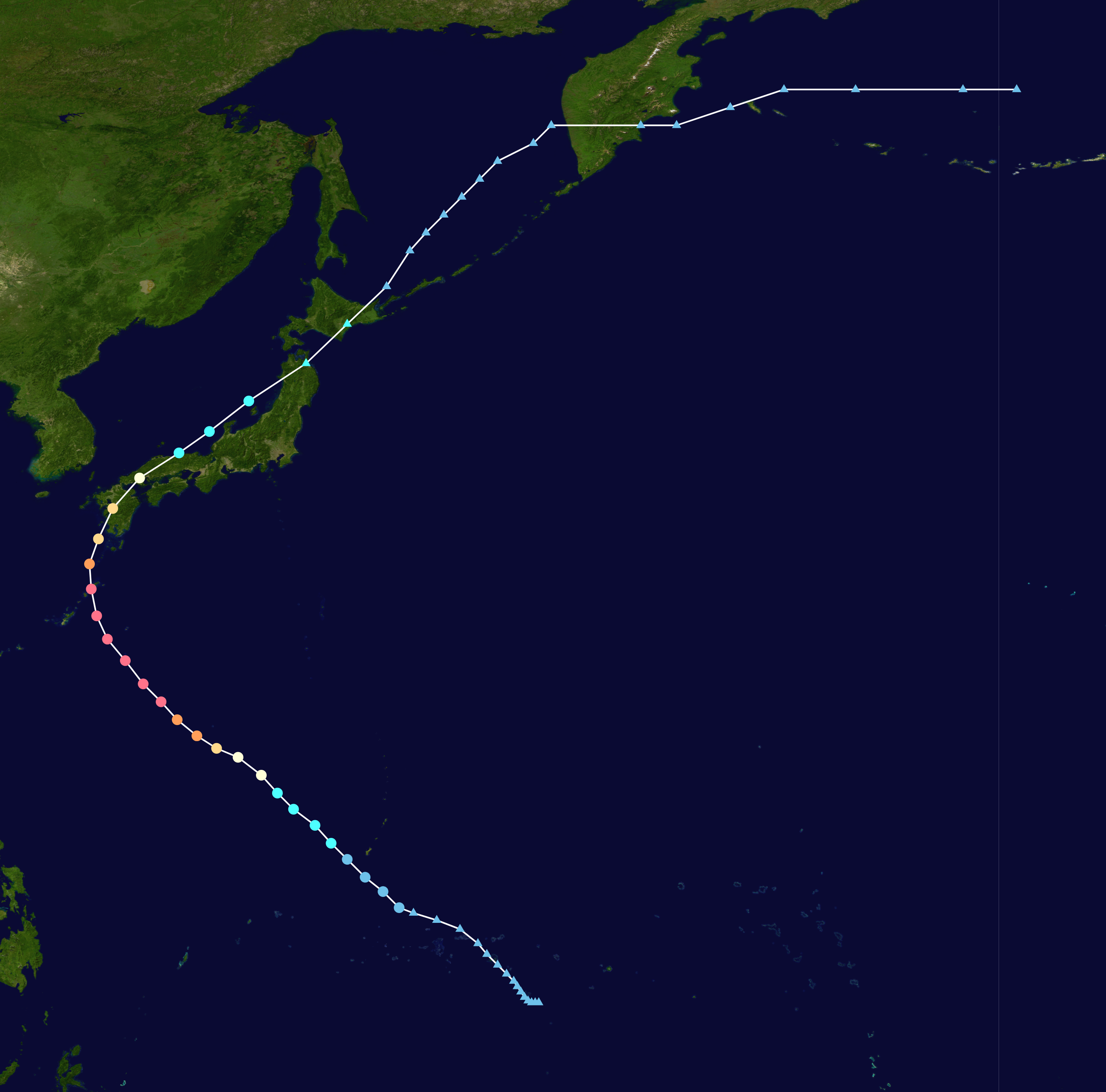
- Duration: August 3 – August 9
- Peak intensity: 175 km/h (110 mph) (10-min); 935 hPa (mbar)

In Japan, Typhoon Janis killed two people and injured 41 others. Total losses from the storm reached 5.8 billion yen ($45.6 million).

=== Super Typhoon Kent ===
- Very strong typhoon (JMA)
- Category 4 super typhoon (SSHWS)
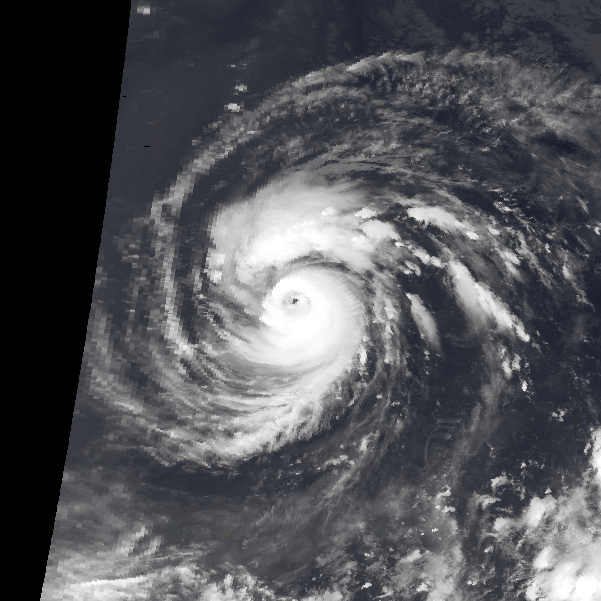
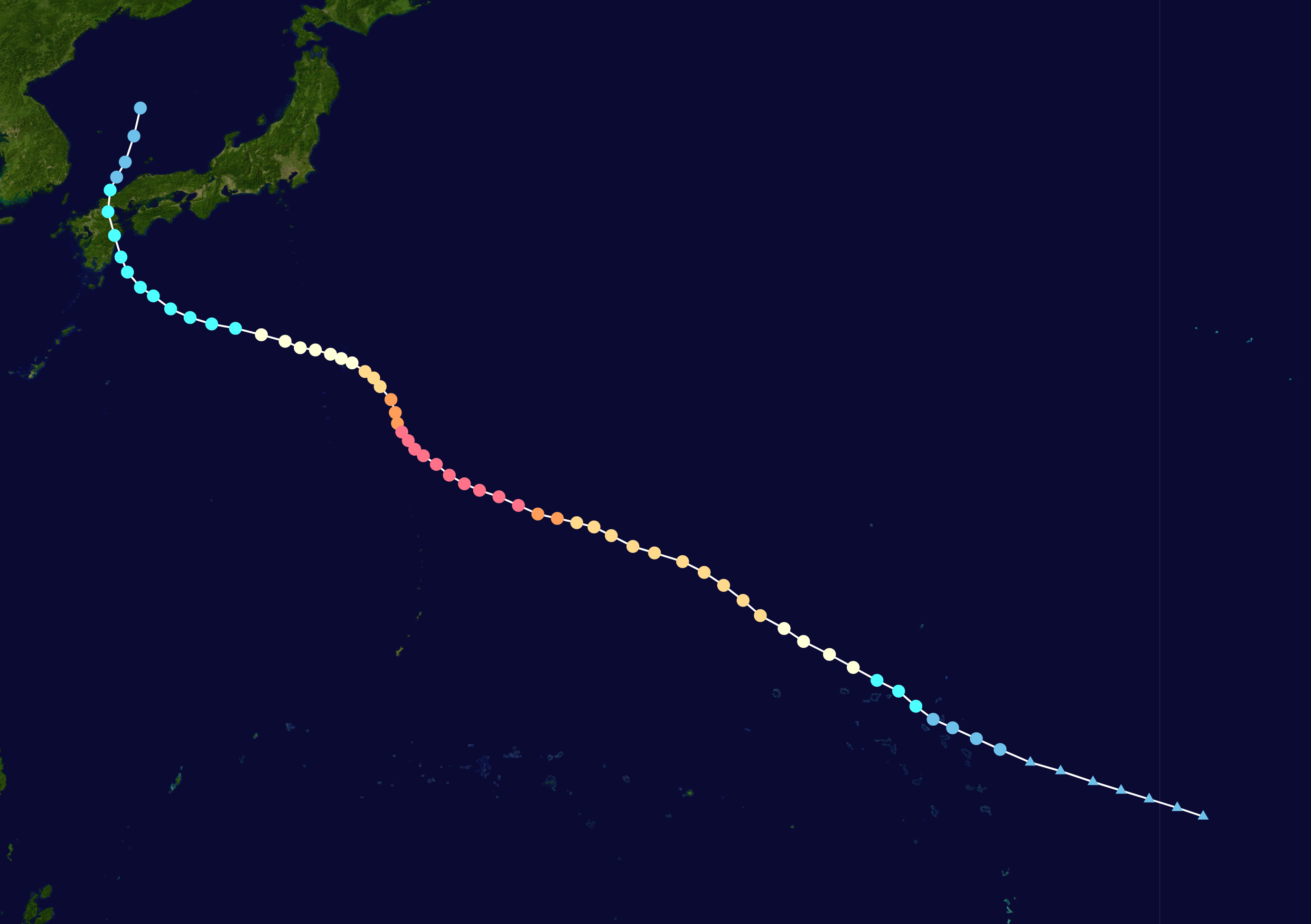
- Duration: August 6 – August 19
- Peak intensity: 175 km/h (110 mph) (10-min); 930 hPa (mbar)

Kent formed on August 5 in the Federated States of Micronesia. Then, it tracked northwest and was intensified into a tropical storm. Then, it was upgraded into a category 1 typhoon. A few days later, the JTWC upgraded Kent into a category 2 typhoon. Then, Kent intensified into a category 3 then to a category 4 typhoon. Kent reached its peak intensity as a super typhoon. Afterwards, Kent moved very slowly. Then, the JTWC downgraded Kent into a category 4 typhoon then to a category 3 typhoon. Kent still moved slowly. Afterwards, the JTWC downgraded Kent into a category 2 typhoon. However, it still moved slowly until it was downgraded into a category 1 typhoon. Afterwards, the JTWC downgraded Kent into a tropical storm. Kent moved northeastwards then affected Japan. After it affected Japan, it weakened into a tropical depression then dissipated on the Sea of Japan.

When Kent was traveling towards Japan, its large waves swept five people on the sea. Overall, Kent caused five deaths.

=== Tropical Storm Lois (Huaning) ===
- Tropical storm (JMA)
- Tropical storm (SSHWS)
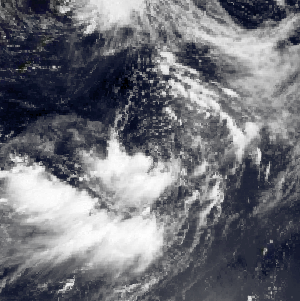
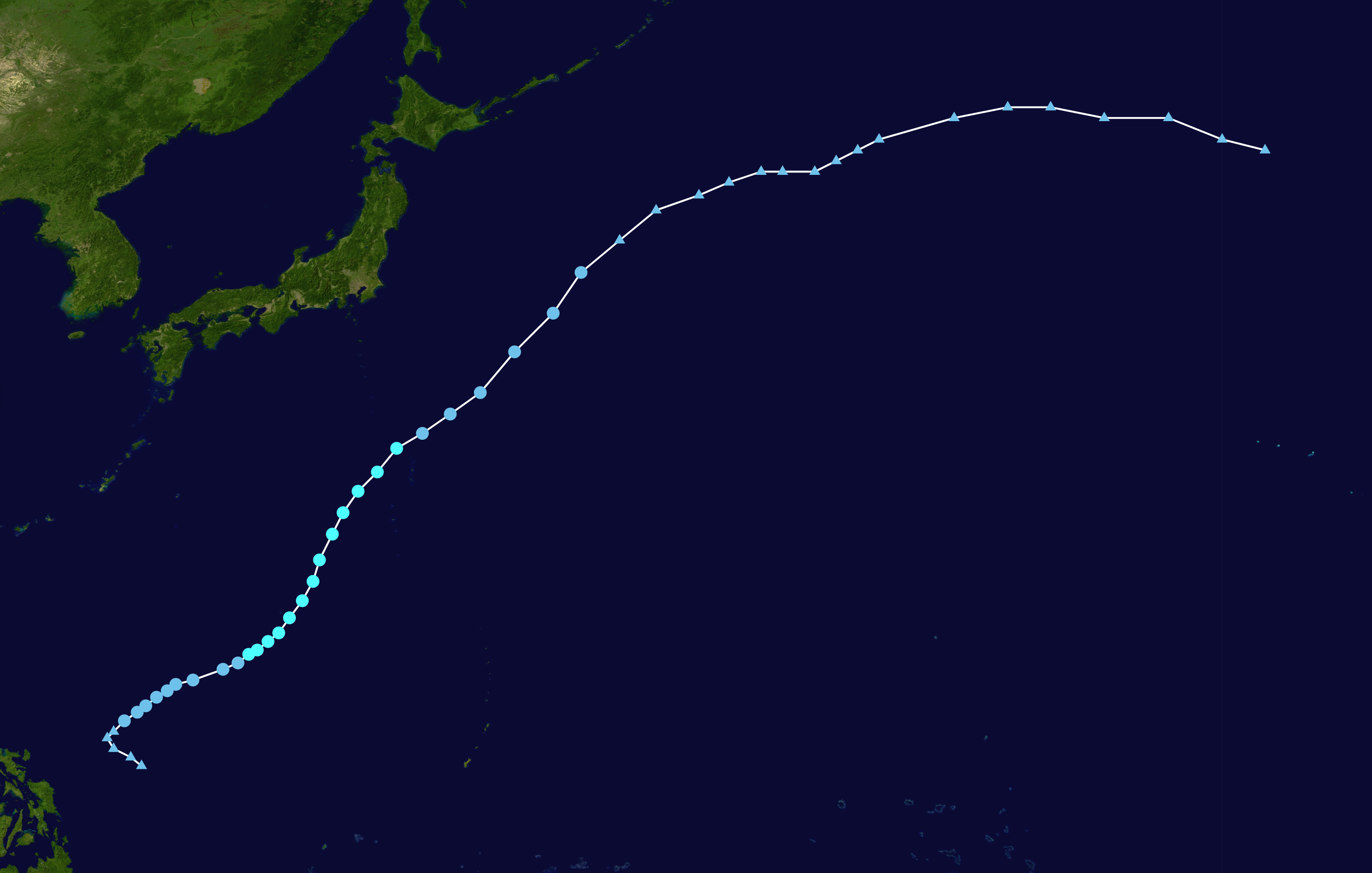
- Duration: August 14 – August 21
- Peak intensity: 65 km/h (40 mph) (10-min); 996 hPa (mbar)

Lois moved northeast away from Japan.

=== Tropical Storm Mark ===
- Tropical storm (JMA)
- Tropical storm (SSHWS)
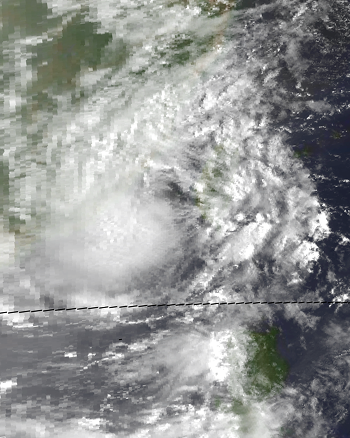
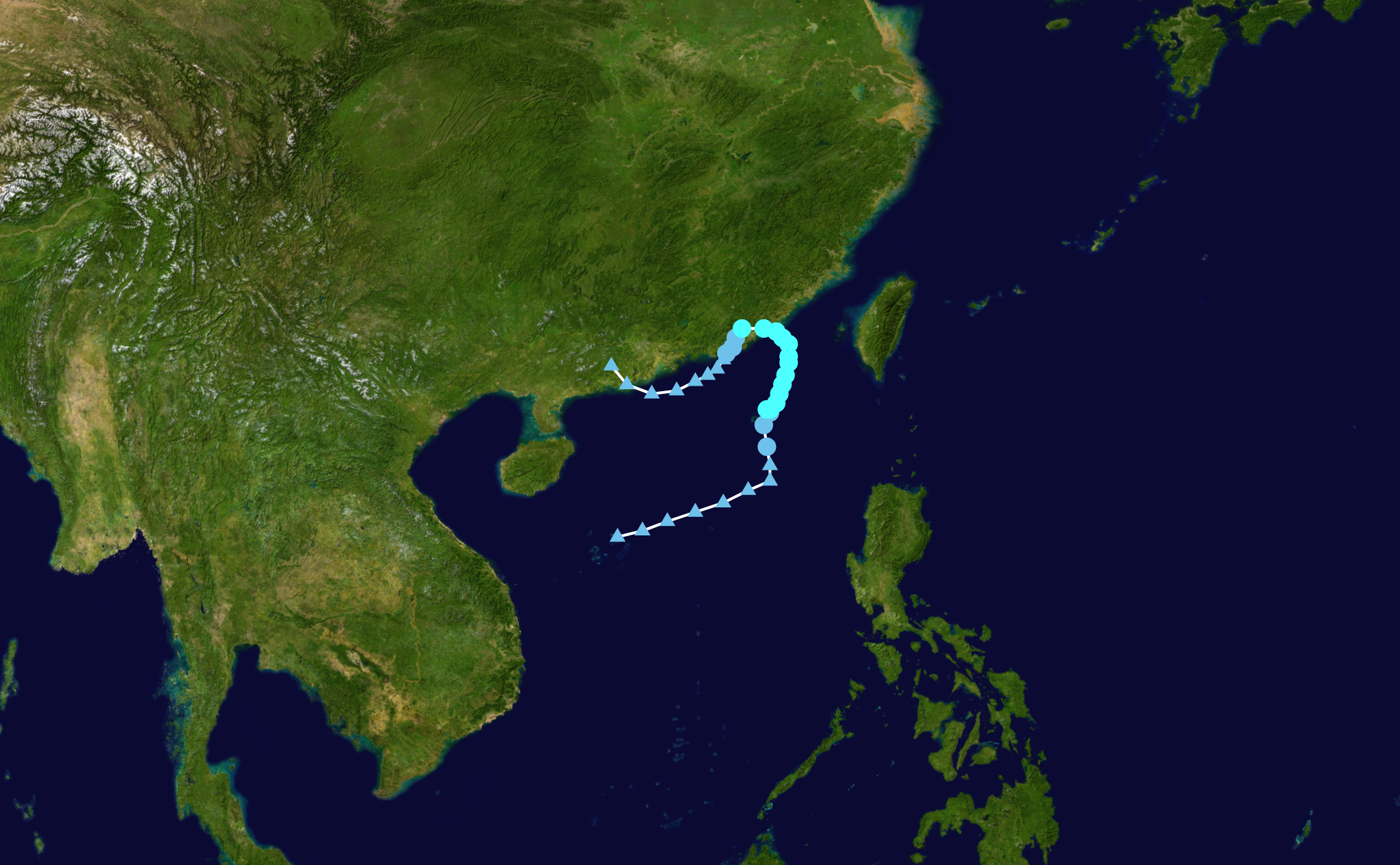
- Duration: August 15 – August 19
- Peak intensity: 85 km/h (50 mph) (10-min); 990 hPa (mbar)

One person was killed and another reported missing. Losses reached $10.4 million.

=== Tropical Storm Nina ===
- Tropical storm (JMA)
- Tropical storm (SSHWS)
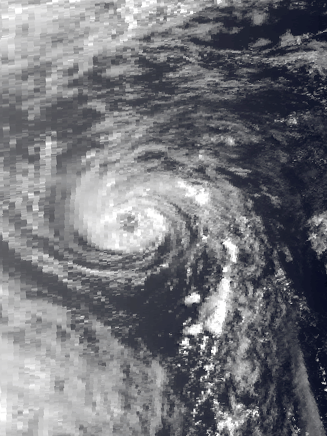
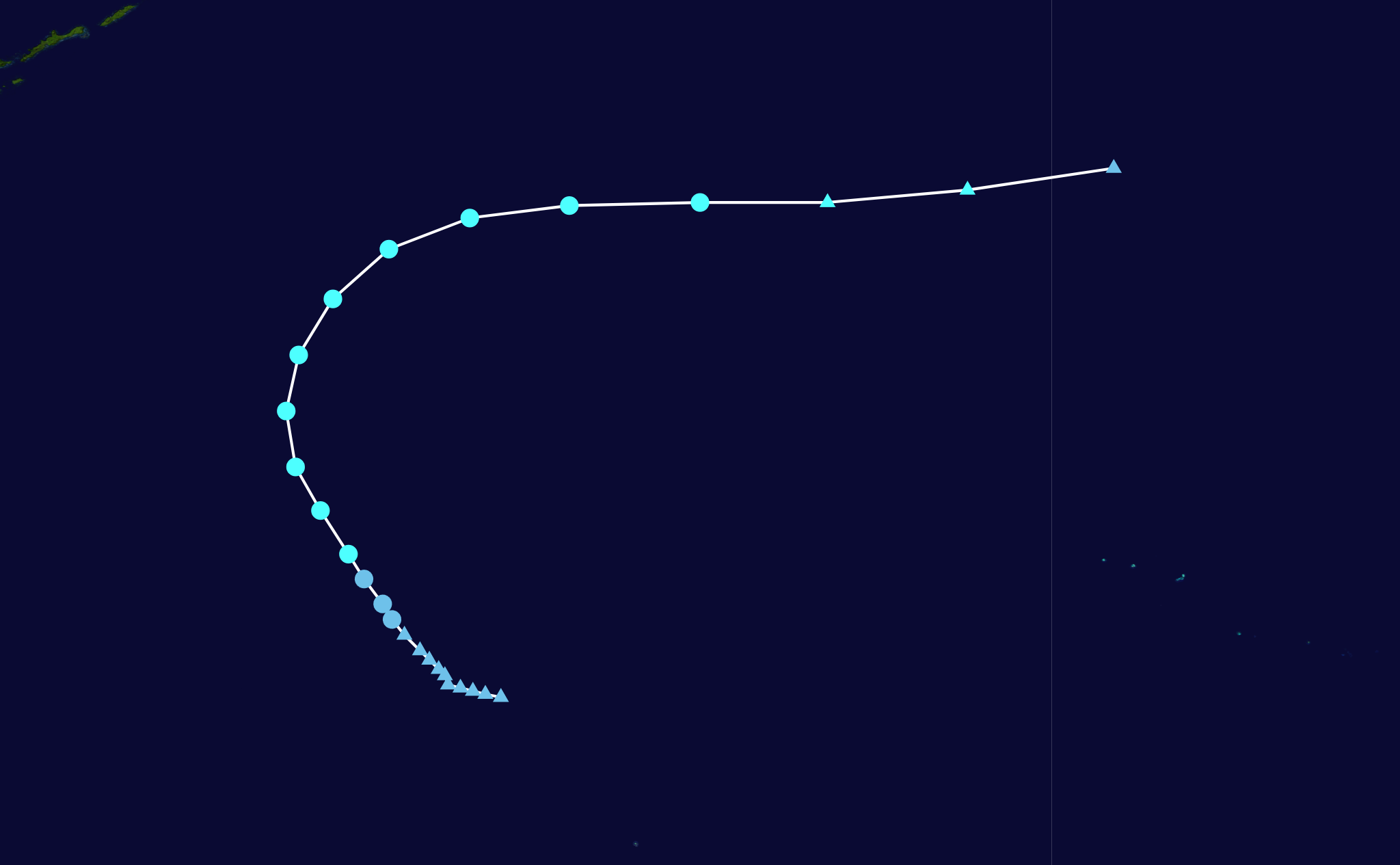
- Duration: August 17 – August 21
- Peak intensity: 65 km/h (40 mph) (10-min); 996 hPa (mbar)

Nina curved away from land.

=== Super Typhoon Omar (Lusing) ===
- Very strong typhoon (JMA)
- Category 4 super typhoon (SSHWS)
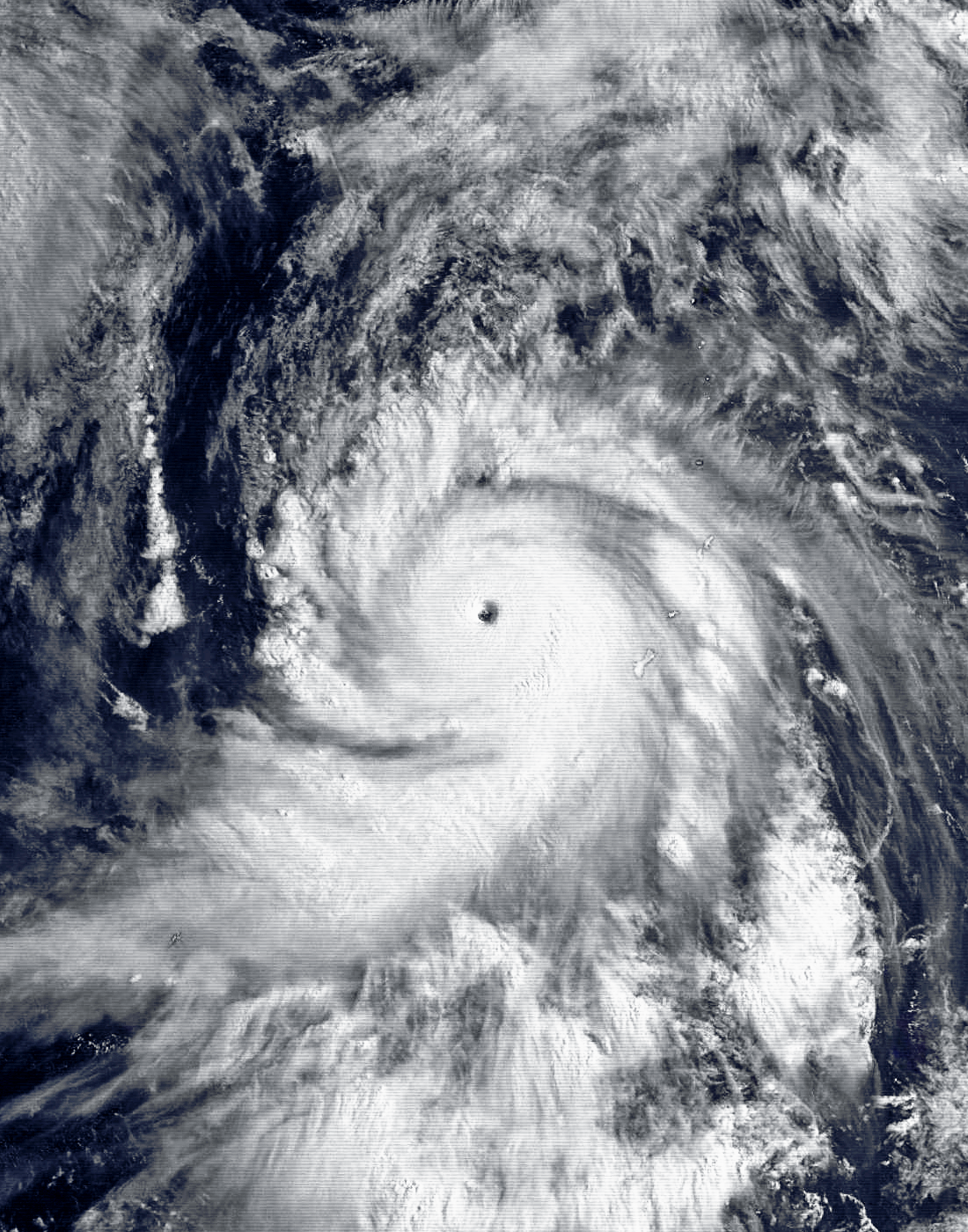
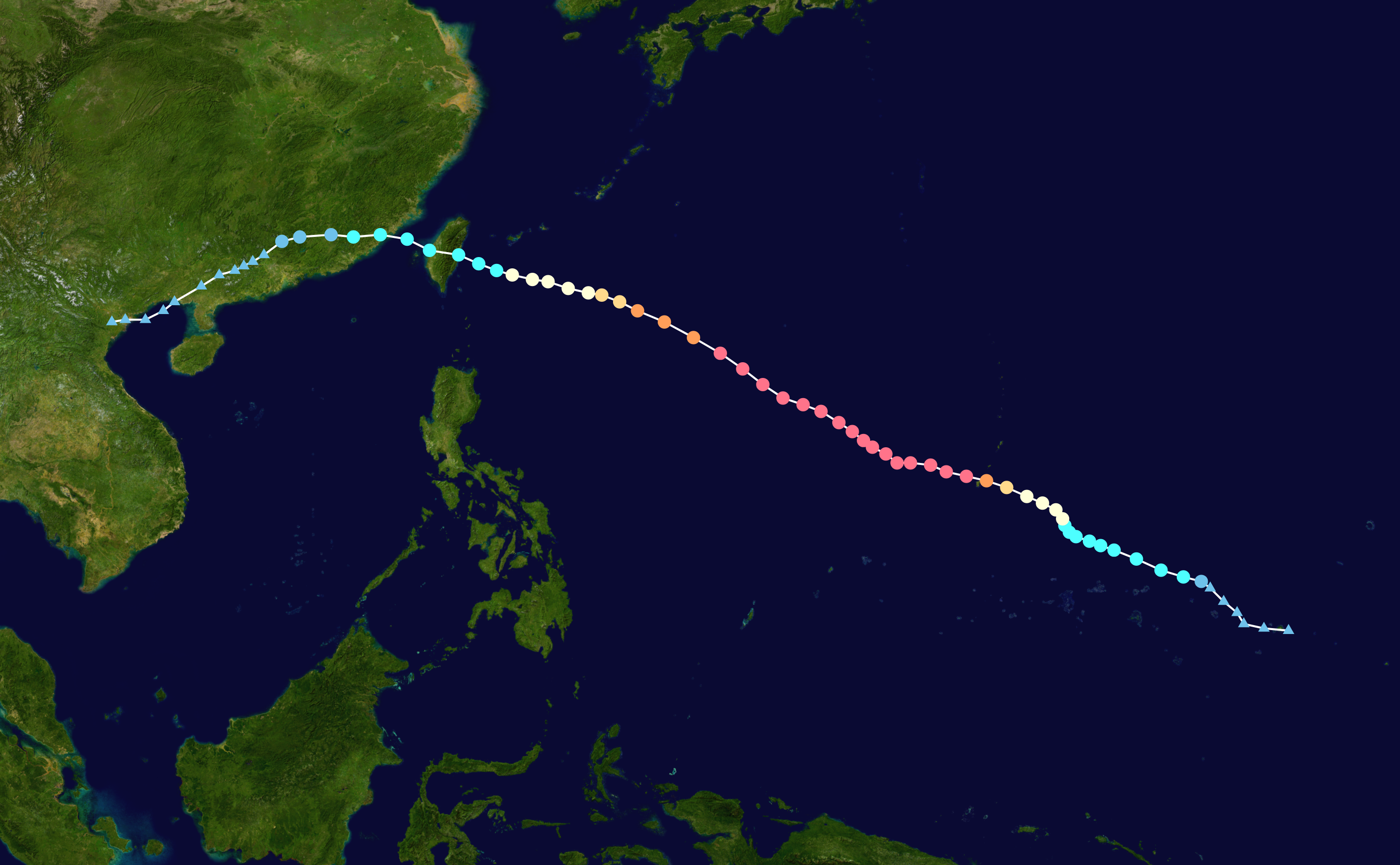
- Duration: August 24 – September 9
- Peak intensity: 185 km/h (115 mph) (10-min); 920 hPa (mbar)

Typhoon Omar originated into a tropical disturbance on August 20. On those days, the basin saw the dissipation of 2 tropical cyclones and another two more cyclones that begin their extratropical transition. The system intensified, prompting JMA and JTWC to name the Tropical depression 15W. 15W tracked westward, and it intensified to a tropical storm then was named Omar by the JMA. Omar begin to track westward, causing the outflow of Tropical Storm Polly to shear the system and slowing intensification. Then JTWC noticed that the wind shear can weaken Omar. The two storms furthered apart, allowing a ridge to develop between them. This caused Omar to drift slowly on the north, and because of the decreasing wind shear, Omar resumed strengthening. The storm later resumed its west-northwest track. On August 27, JTWC designed the storm as a typhoon, developing an eye. On August 28, Omar rapidly intensified and it made landfall on Guam with maximum sustained winds with 195 km/h (121 mph). On August 29, the storm reached its peak intensity with 10 min. sustained winds of 185 km/h (115 mph) and the lowest pressure of 920 mbar. This intensity remained for 24 hours before it weakened. However, JTWC estimated 1 min. winds at 240 km/h (150 mph). Two days later, Omar entered the PAR and PAGASA assigned the local name Lusing. On September 3, Omar weakened into a tropical storm by JMA, but JTWC maintained the storm at the typhoon strength. The storm still tracked westward, then made landfall on east coast of Taiwan. Then it made its final landfall near Fujian in Eastern China on September 5. Then it degenerated to a tropical depression before turning west-southwest. Then it moved on southern China as a weak system, dissipating on September 9 on northern Vietnam.

Typhoon Omar was a destructive storm to Guam, causing over a foot of rain there, amounting to $702 million in damage (2008 USD) and a death. In Taiwan, the storm caused 2 deaths and heavy rainfall, which warranted the name's retirement. The name Omar was replaced with Oscar which was first used in the 1995 season.

=== Severe Tropical Storm Polly (Isang) ===
- Severe tropical storm (JMA)
- Tropical storm (SSHWS)
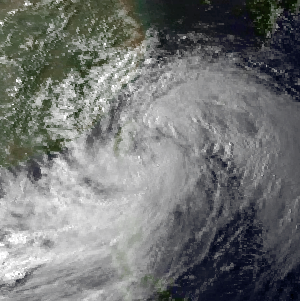
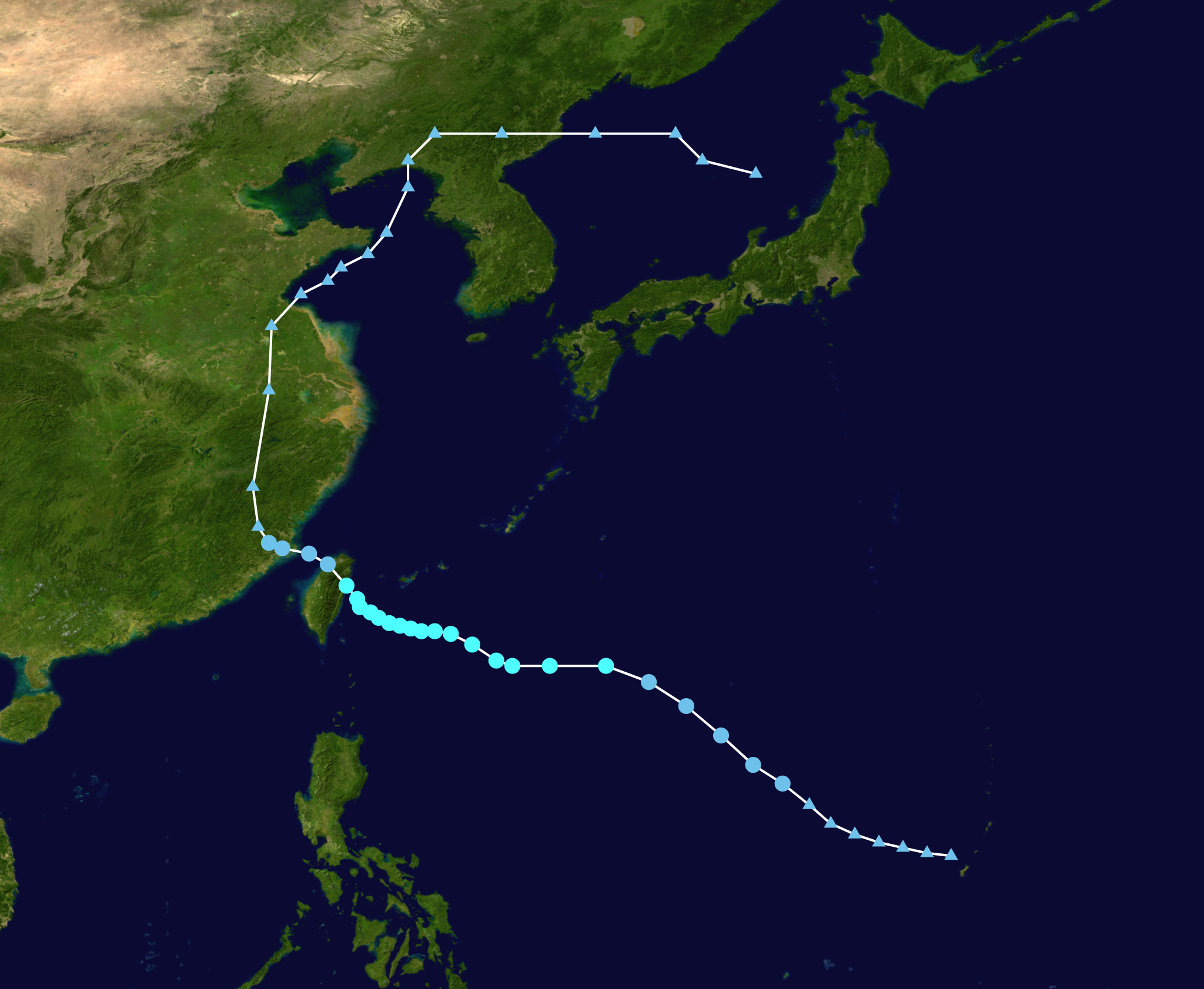
- Duration: August 27 – September 1
- Peak intensity: 100 km/h (65 mph) (10-min); 975 hPa (mbar)

Developing to Omar's west, Polly began its life on August 23 and reached tropical storm strength on the 26th. As a developing monsoon depression, it had a large outflow. Polly retained that throughout its lifetime, inhibiting intensification past 60 mph (97 km/h) winds. On the 30th, the storm hit southeastern Taiwan, and on the 31st it hit China.

Torrential rains produced by Tropical Storm Polly triggered devastating floods that killed 202 people and injured hundreds more. More than 5 million people were left homeless across Fujian and Zhejiang Provinces in China. Total losses from the storm were roughly $450 million.

=== Typhoon Ryan ===
- Very strong typhoon (JMA)
- Category 4 typhoon (SSHWS)
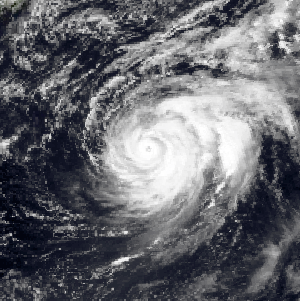
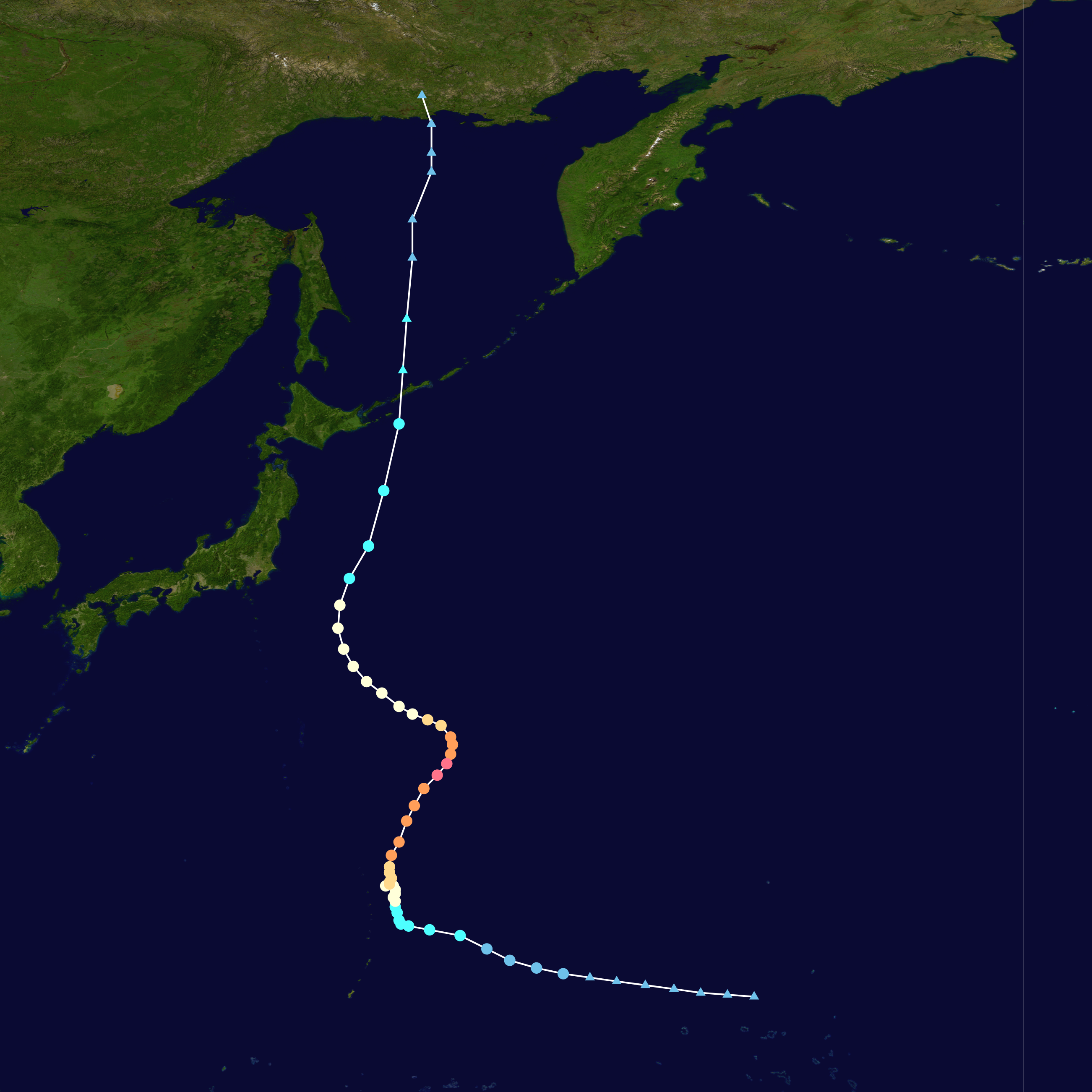
- Duration: September 1 – September 11
- Peak intensity: 155 km/h (100 mph) (10-min); 945 hPa (mbar)

Ryan was a potent typhoon that passed east of Japan. Despite passing well offshore, the storm damaged 3,128 homes and destroyed nine homes in Hokkaido. One person was killed. Damage was estimated at ¥13.9 billion (US$110 million).

=== Typhoon Sibyl ===
- Very strong typhoon (JMA)
- Category 3 typhoon (SSHWS)
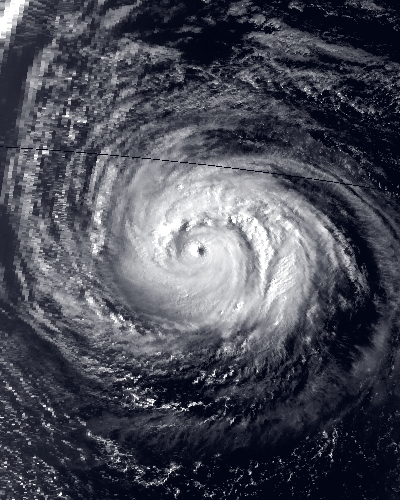
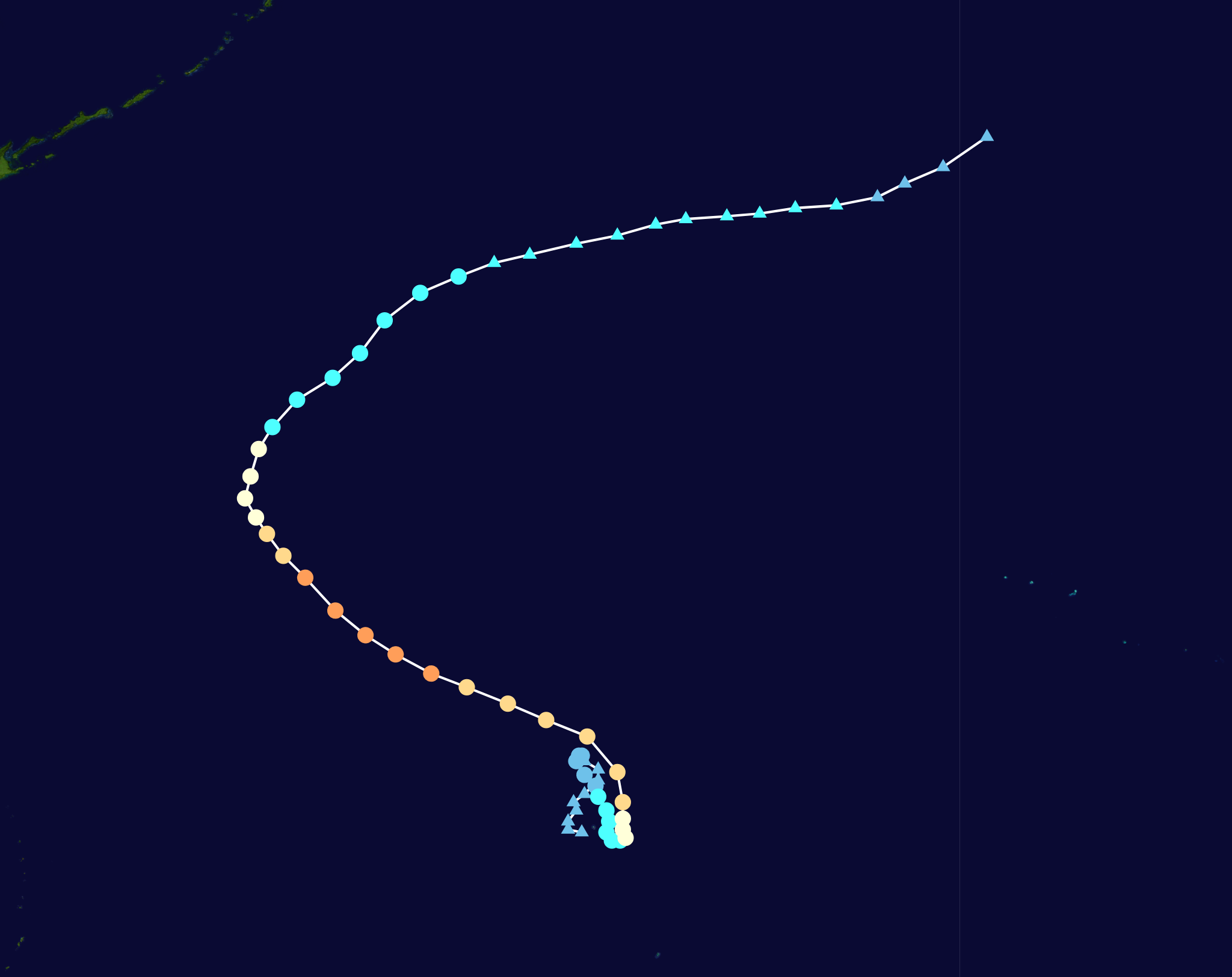
- Duration: September 4 – September 15
- Peak intensity: 155 km/h (100 mph) (10-min); 940 hPa (mbar)

Typhoon Sibyl took an unusual track east of Japan, first heading northward, then back south, and finally north again while strengthening. Then, it curved west and dissipated as it recurved eastward.

=== Typhoon Ted (Maring) ===
- Severe tropical storm (JMA)
- Category 1 typhoon (SSHWS)
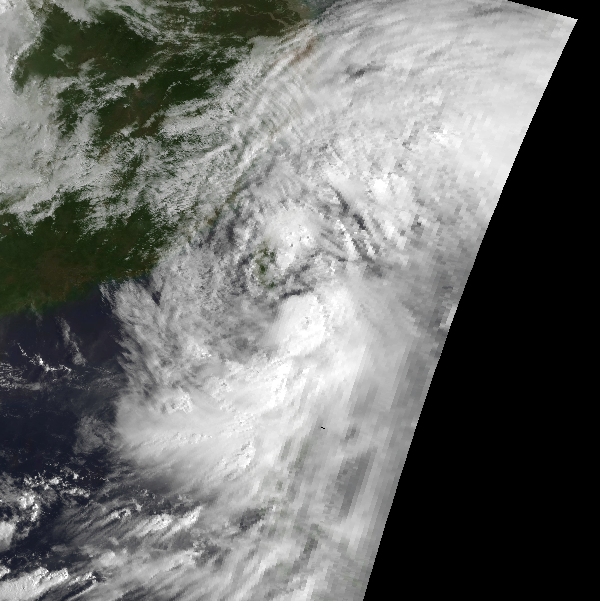
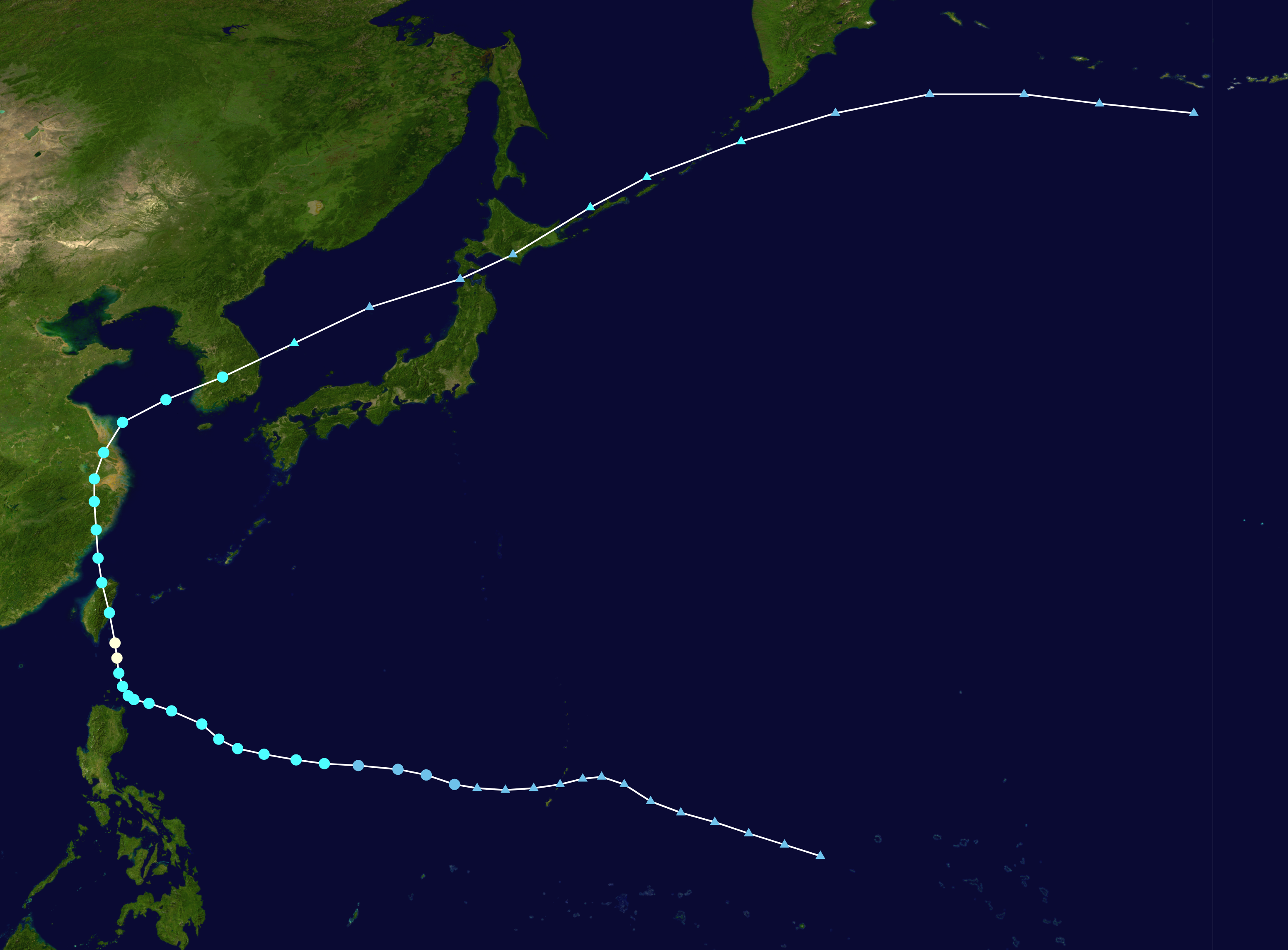
- Duration: September 18 – September 24
- Peak intensity: 95 km/h (60 mph) (10-min); 985 hPa (mbar)

Tropical Storm Ted, having developed on September 14, stalled off northern Luzon on the 20th. It turned northward, and hit southern Taiwan on the 22nd as a minimal typhoon. Ted weakened to a tropical storm over the island, and hit eastern China on the 23rd. It turned to the northeast, hit South Korea, and became extratropical on the 24th.

At least 61 people were killed by Typhoon Ted and 51 others were reported missing. Losses from the storm reached $360 million in China.

=== Tropical Storm Val ===
- Tropical storm (JMA)
- Tropical storm (SSHWS)
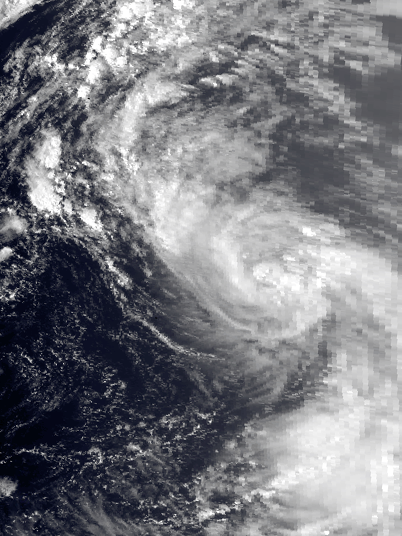
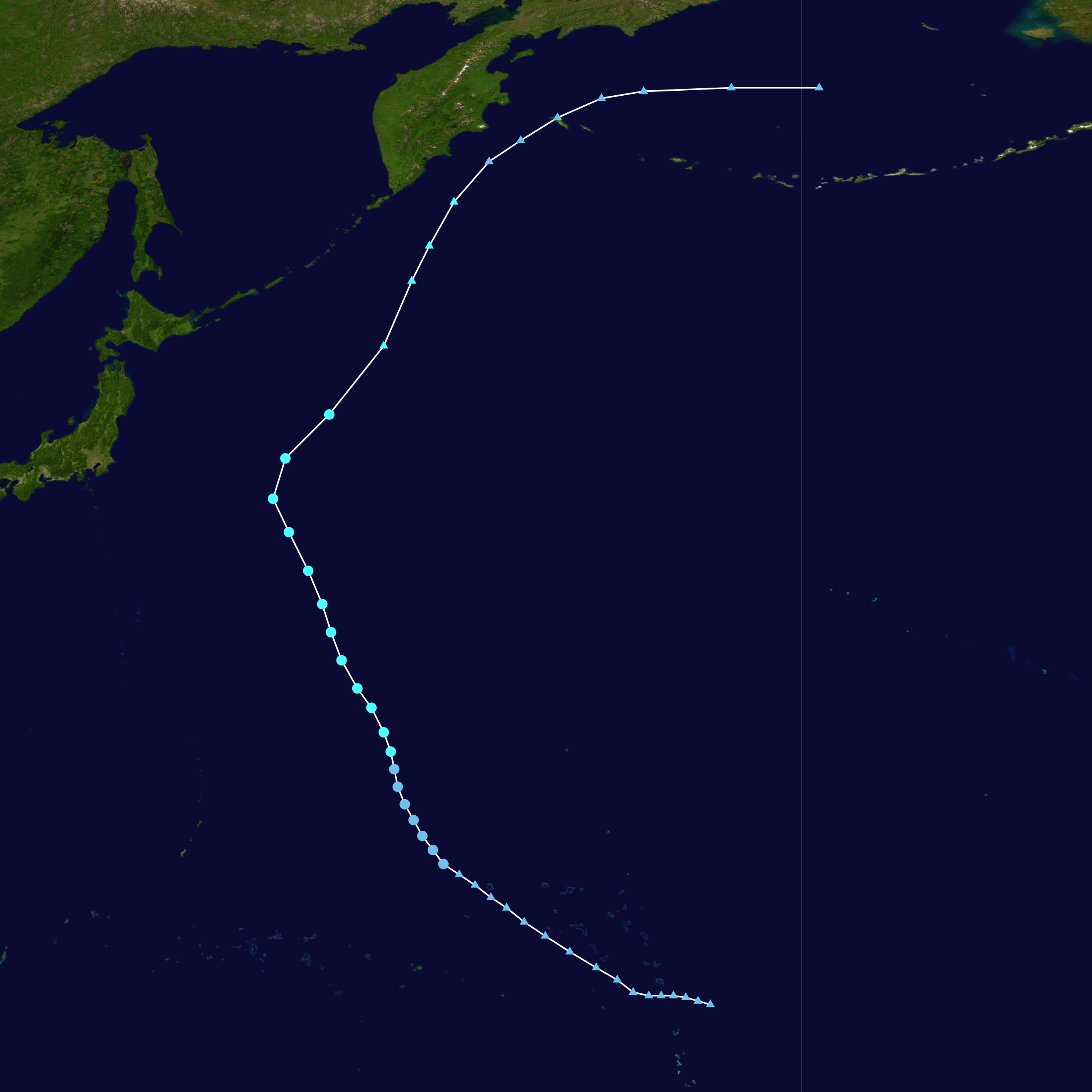
- Duration: September 24 – September 27
- Peak intensity: 85 km/h (50 mph) (10-min); 990 hPa (mbar)

Val stayed at sea.

=== Typhoon Ward ===
- Very strong typhoon (JMA)
- Category 2 typhoon (SSHWS)
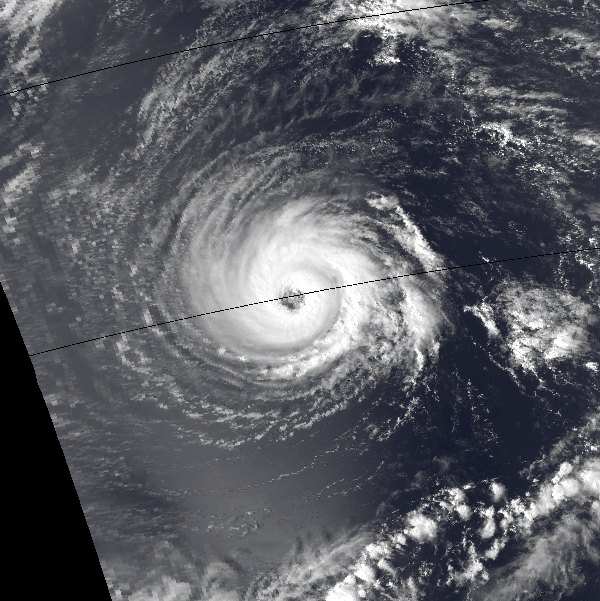
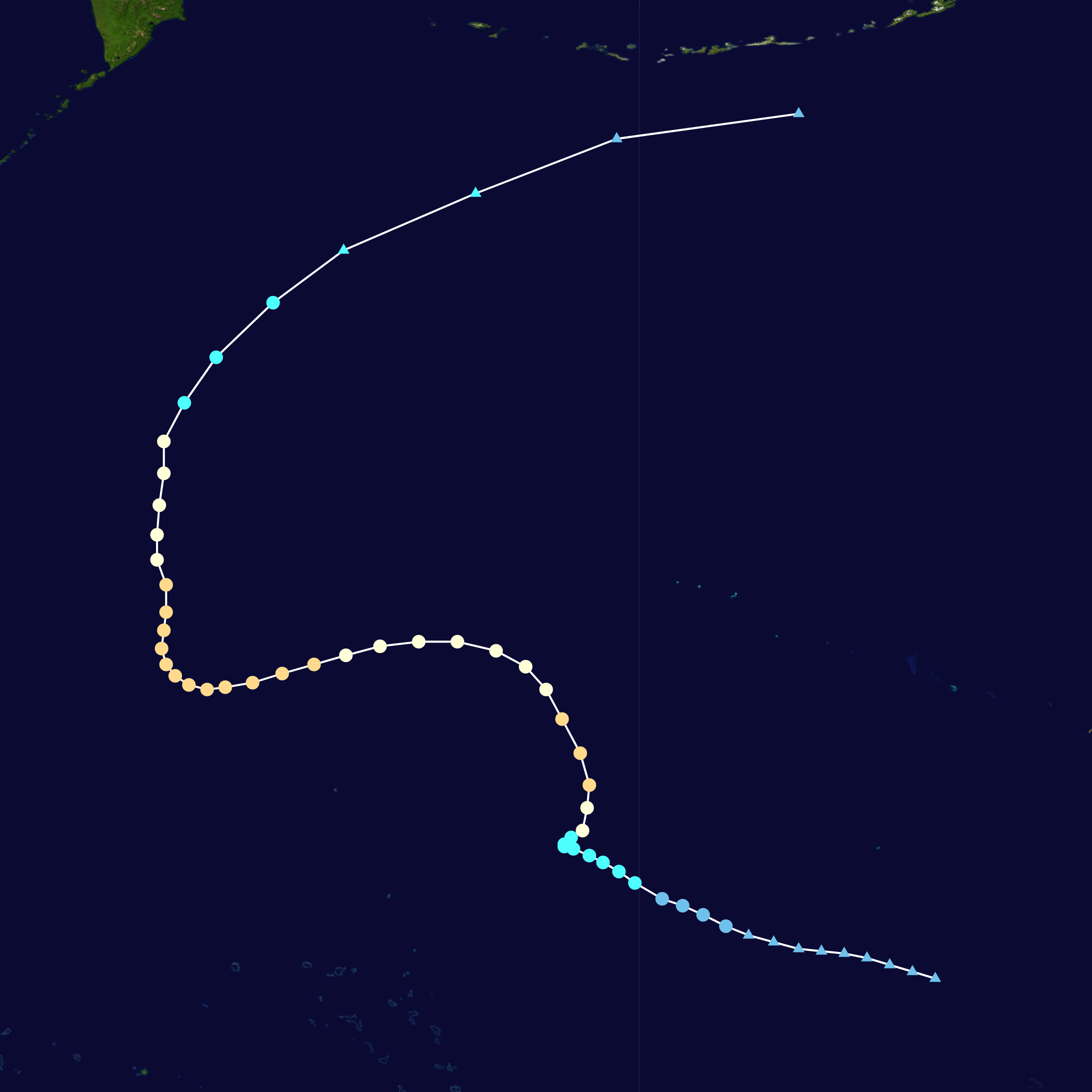
- Duration: September 27 (Entered basin) – October 6
- Peak intensity: 155 km/h (100 mph) (10-min); 945 hPa (mbar)

On September 23, a tropical depression developed just east of the International Dateline; however, it was warned upon by the Joint Typhoon Warning Center rather than the Central Pacific Hurricane Center as it was expected to become a significant tropical cyclone outside of the CPHC's area of responsibility. Just prior to crossing into the Western Pacific basin, it reached tropical storm intensity, at which time it was given the name Ward from the list of Pacific typhoon names. Winds at this time were estimated at 40 mph (64 km/h); the Japan Meteorological Agency reported the system to have also attained a pressure of 1,002 mbar (1,002 hPa; 29.6 inHg). Over the following days, Ward gradually intensified, peaking as a Category 2 storm with winds of 110 mph (180 km/h). The storm eventually weakened as it moved through higher latitudes, becoming extratropical on October 7 over open waters.

=== Super Typhoon Yvette (Ningning) ===
- Very strong typhoon (JMA)
- Category 5 super typhoon (SSHWS)
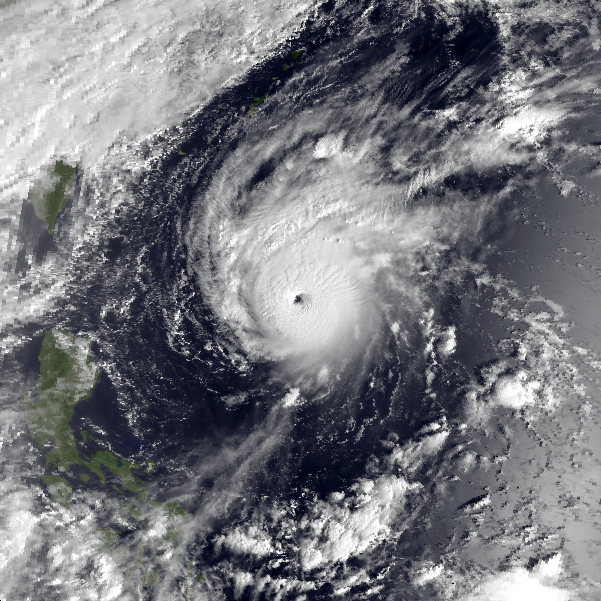
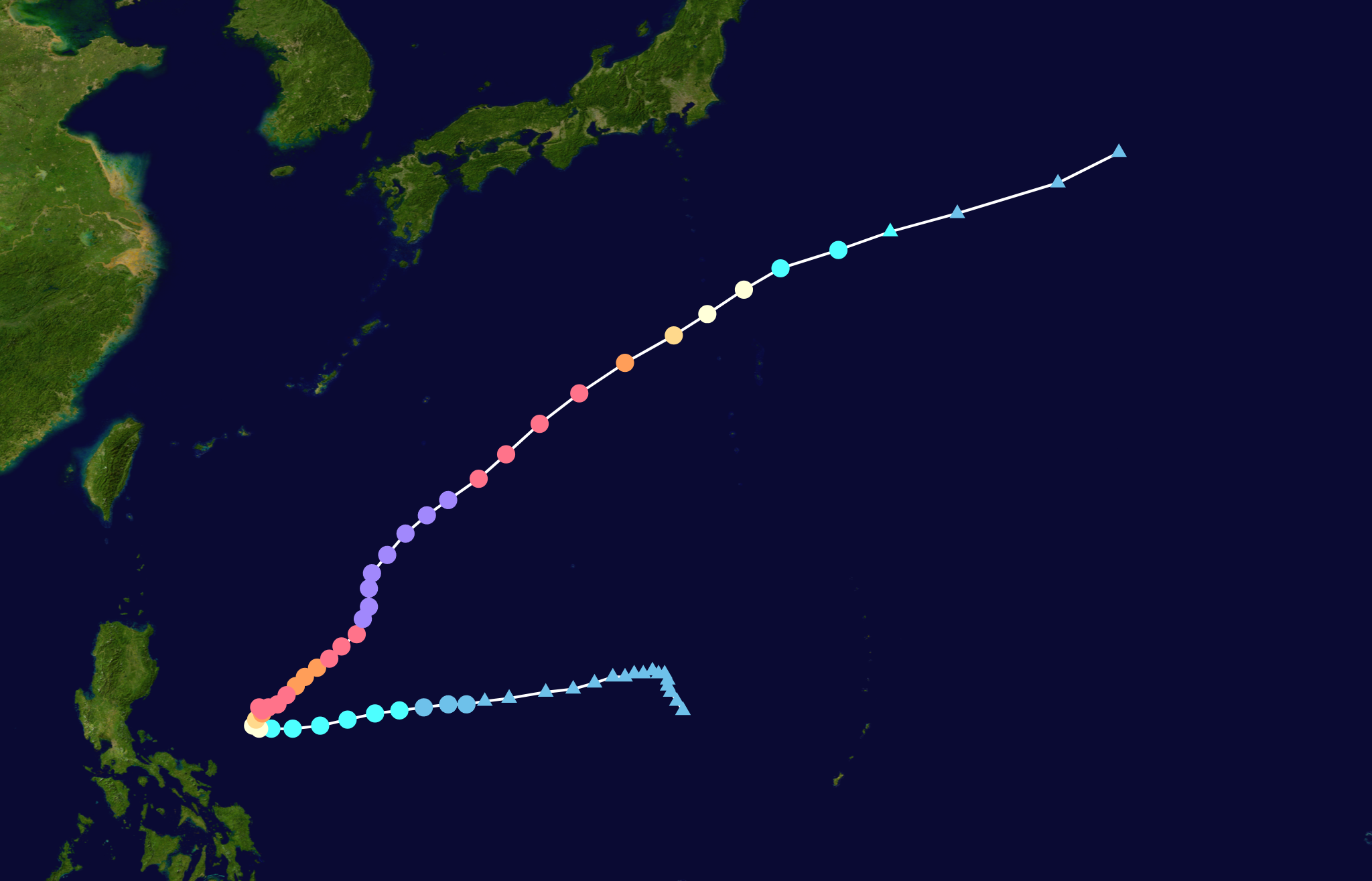
- Duration: October 7 – October 17
- Peak intensity: 185 km/h (115 mph) (10-min); 915 hPa (mbar)

A depression that formed near the Mariana Islands organized and was upgraded into a tropical storm on October 7, and was given the name Yvette. It rapidly intensified into a super typhoon which started to recurve out at sea, preventing major impacts at the Philippines. Yvette started to weaken as it headed towards colder waters and eventually dissipated on October 17.

=== Tropical Storm Zack ===
- Tropical storm (JMA)
- Tropical storm (SSHWS)
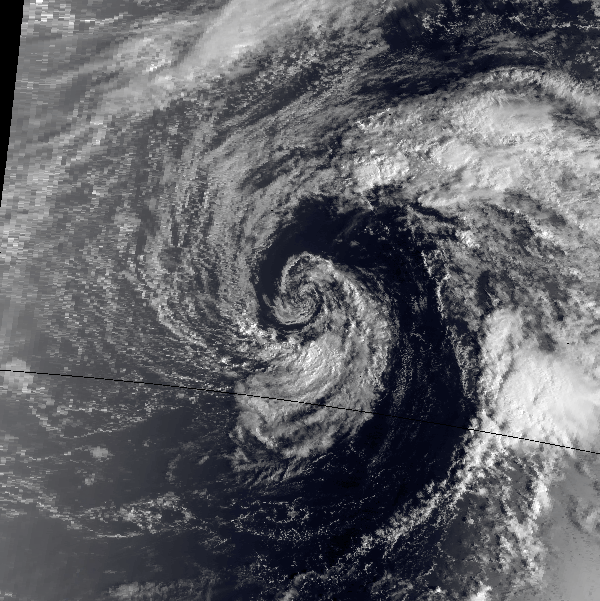
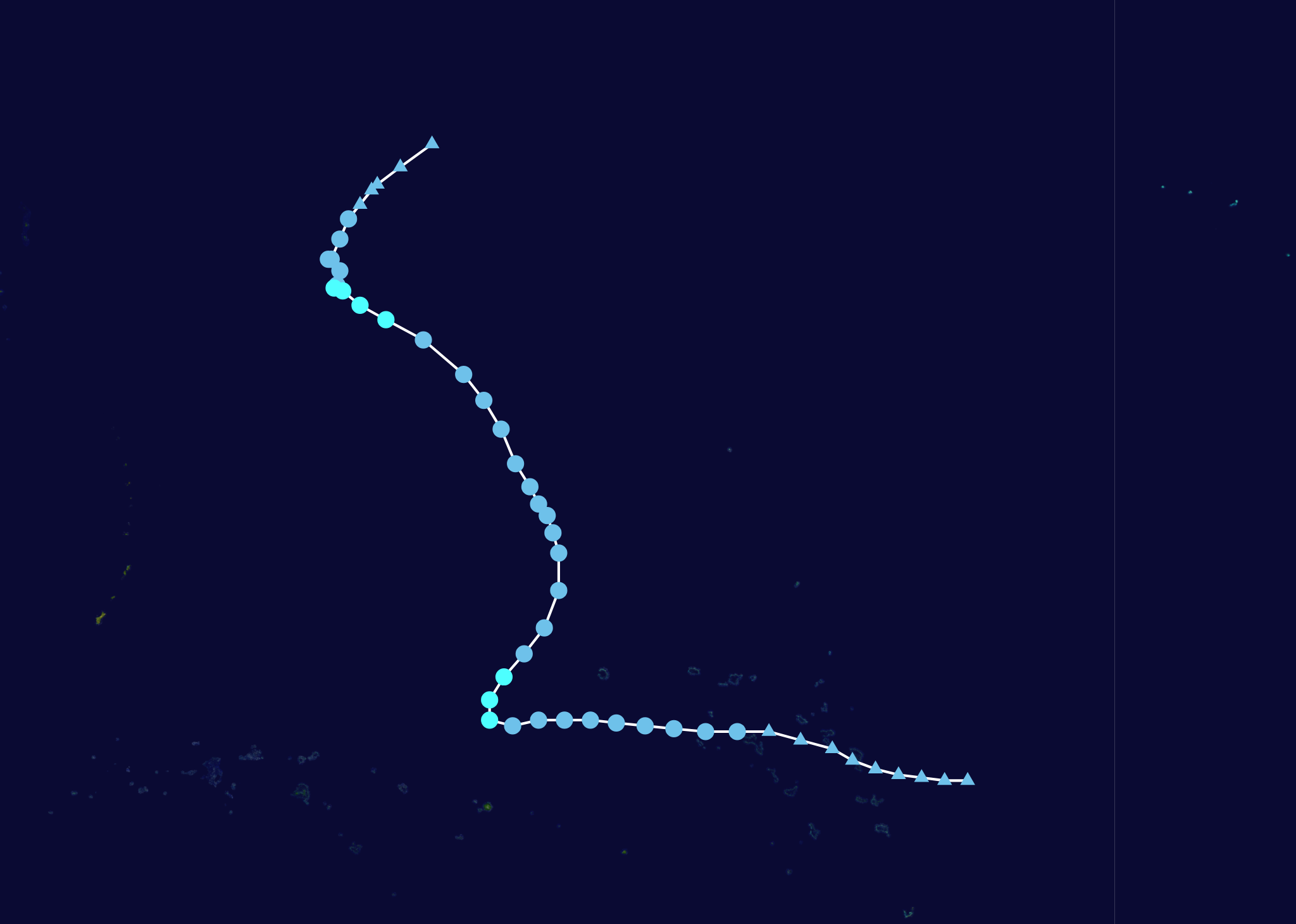
- Duration: October 8 – October 16
- Peak intensity: 75 km/h (45 mph) (10-min); 992 hPa (mbar)

Zack stayed away from land.

=== Typhoon Angela (Osang) ===
- Typhoon (JMA)
- Category 2 typhoon (SSHWS)
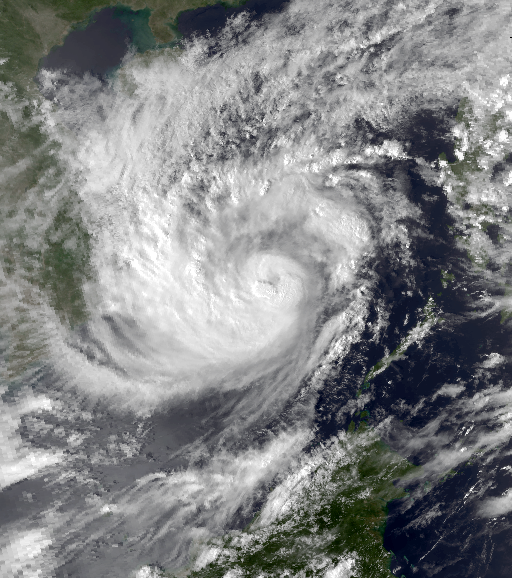
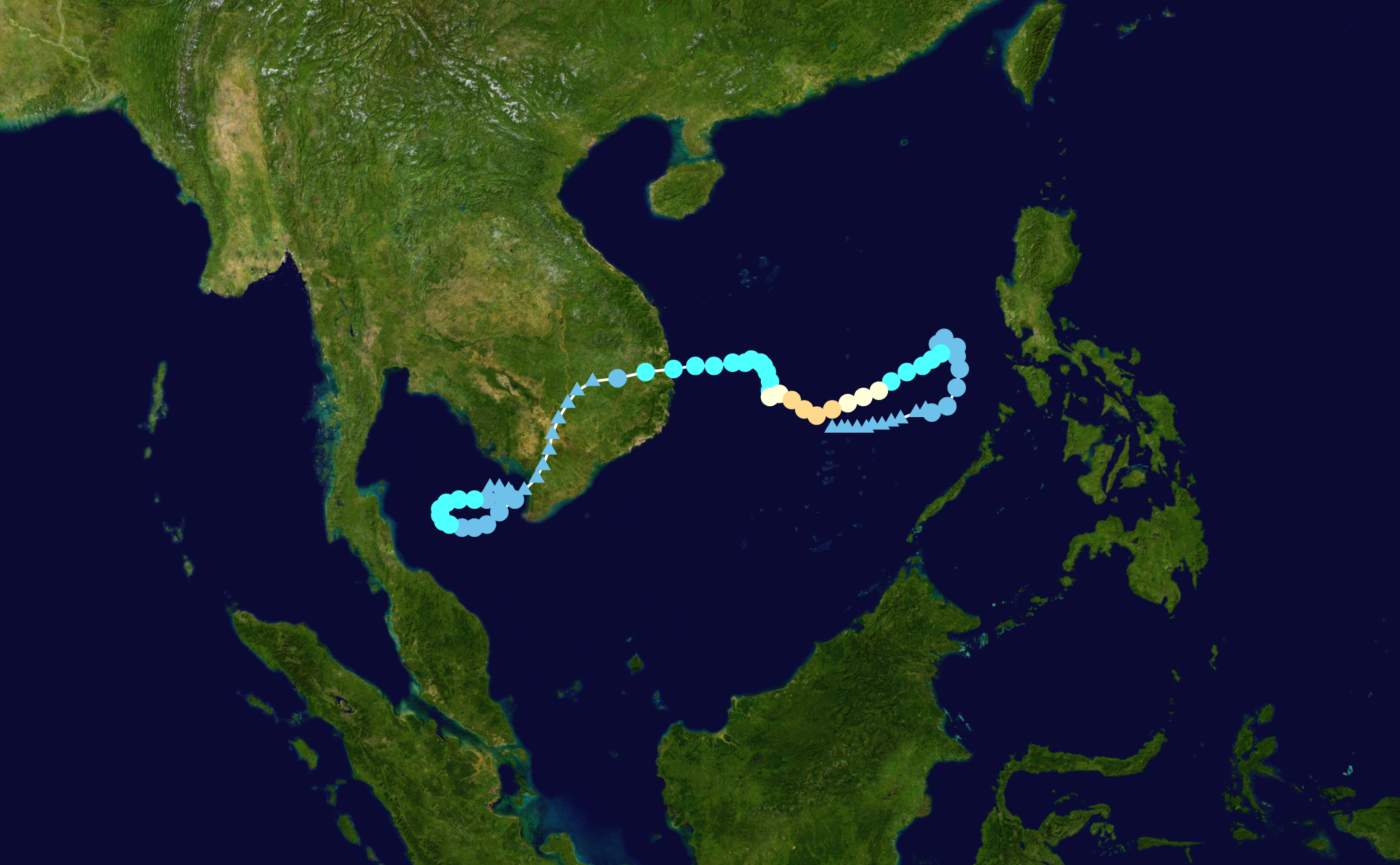
- Duration: October 15 – October 30
- Peak intensity: 120 km/h (75 mph) (10-min); 970 hPa (mbar)

A disturbance formed along the monsoon trough to the east of the Philippines on October 12. After wind shear brought on by the powerful Typhoon Yvette subsided, the disturbance began to organize, and the JTWC issued the first warning on Tropical Depression 24W on October 16. Around a day later, the JTWC named the storm Angela after it reached tropical storm intensity, and was also given the local name of Osang by PAGASA. Angela would further strengthen and reach typhoon status, reaching peak 1-minute sustained windspeeds equivalent to that of a category 2 hurricane on the Saffir-Simpson scale. After its circulation became partially exposed, it was downgraded back to tropical storm status, and struck central Vietnam as a tropical storm on October 23. The remnants of Angela would traverse across land and eventually emerge into the Gulf of Thailand on October 27. The JTWC noted that Angela had regenerated into a tropical cyclone later that day, as it executed a small loop. Operationally, the JTWC considered the storm to have briefly reached typhoon intensity, however this peak intensity was downgraded in their post-analysis report. The JMA also considered Angela to have regenerated, though it would quickly weaken and dissipate on October 29, with the agency tracking the remnants of the storm until a day after. Notably, this regeneration marked a rare occurrence in which two or more storms are active at the same time in the South China Sea, along with Severe Tropical Storm Colleen, which would later go on to also strike Vietnam.

Angela caused flooding in southern Vietnam that led to loss of livestock, crops, and damage to roads and fishing boats. When Angela regenerated, it resulted in staffed gas platforms over the Gulf of Thailand being evacuated. At least 49 people were reported dead, mostly in Vietnam, while 14 others were reported missing.

=== Typhoon Brian ===
- Typhoon (JMA)
- Category 2 typhoon (SSHWS)
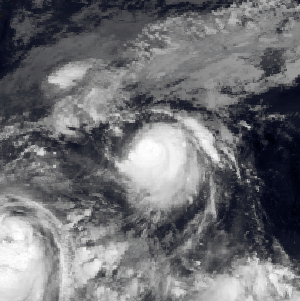
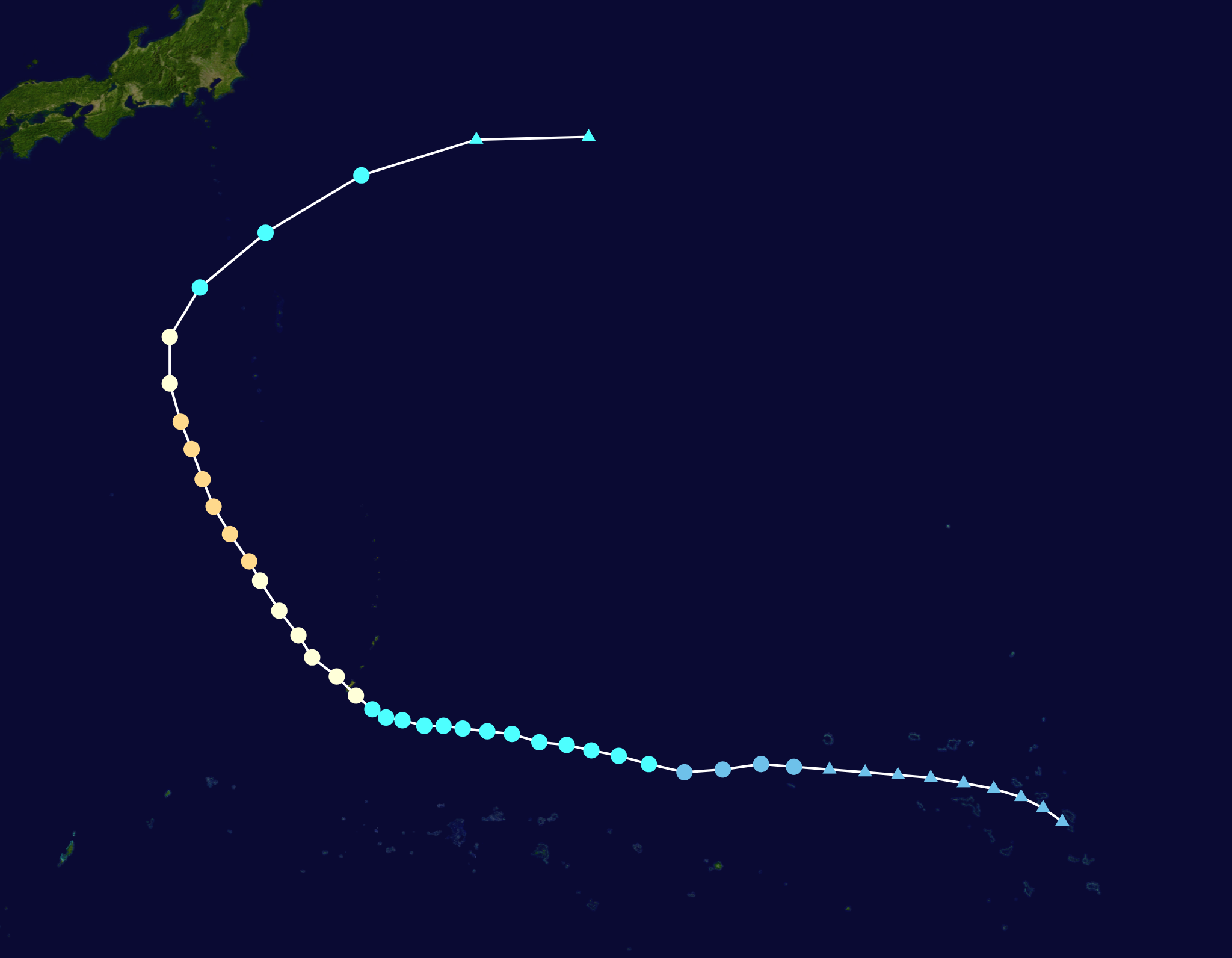
- Duration: October 17 – October 25
- Peak intensity: 150 km/h (90 mph) (10-min); 950 hPa (mbar)

Brian caused small damage in Guam, but no deaths were reported.

=== Typhoon Colleen (Paring) ===
- Severe tropical storm (JMA)
- Category 1 typhoon (SSHWS)
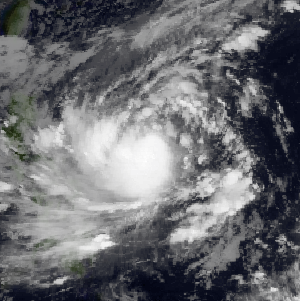
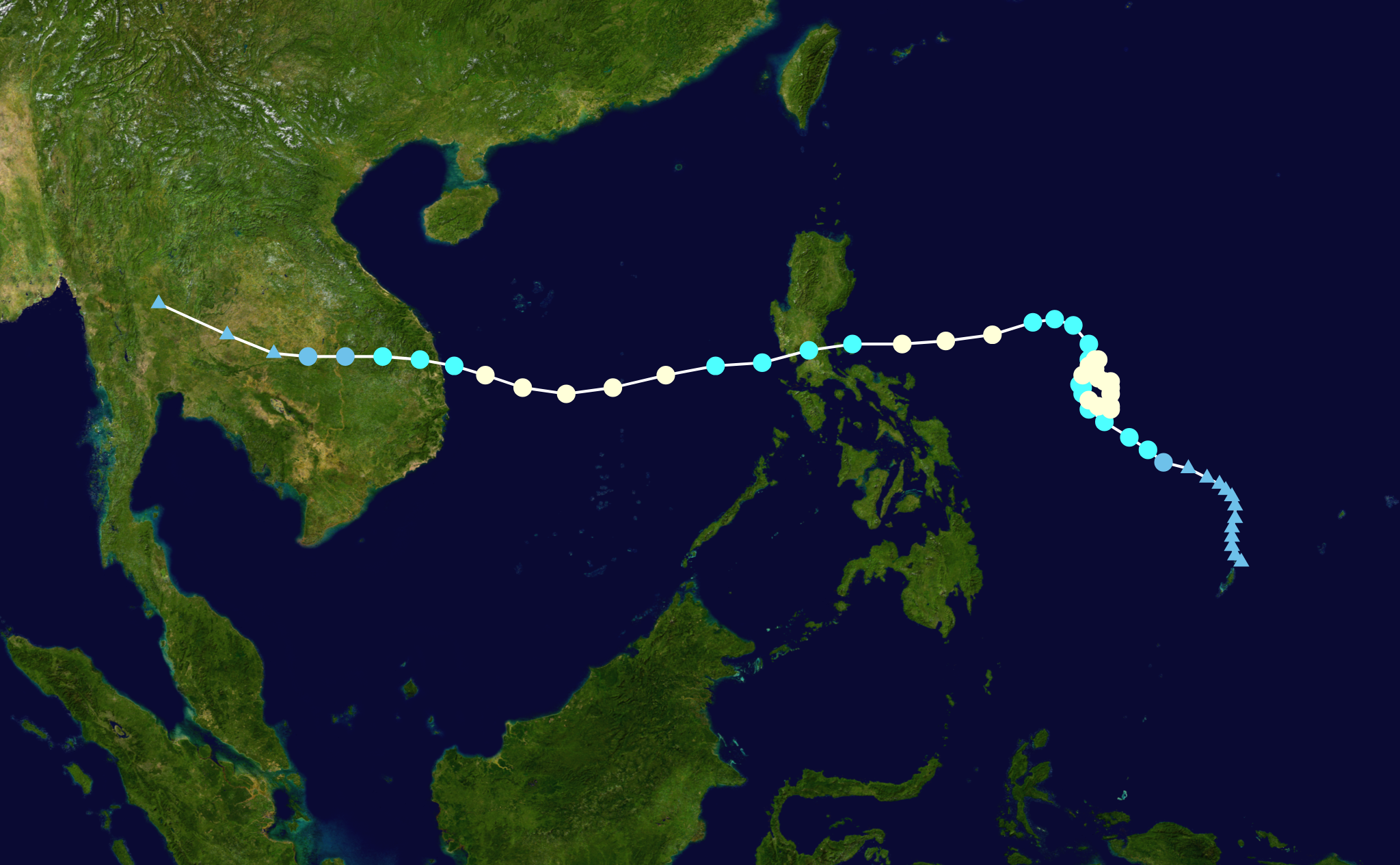
- Duration: October 17 – October 29
- Peak intensity: 100 km/h (65 mph) (10-min); 980 hPa (mbar)

Colleen intensified over the South China Sea before making landfall in Vietnam.

=== Typhoon Dan ===
- Very strong typhoon (JMA)
- Category 3 typhoon (SSHWS)
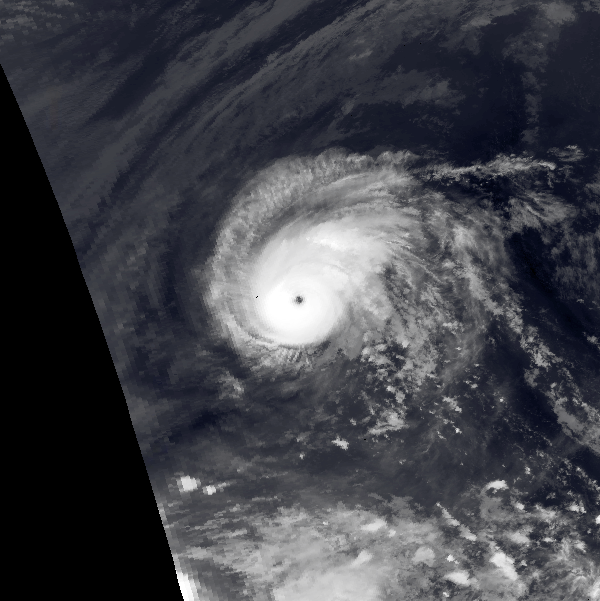
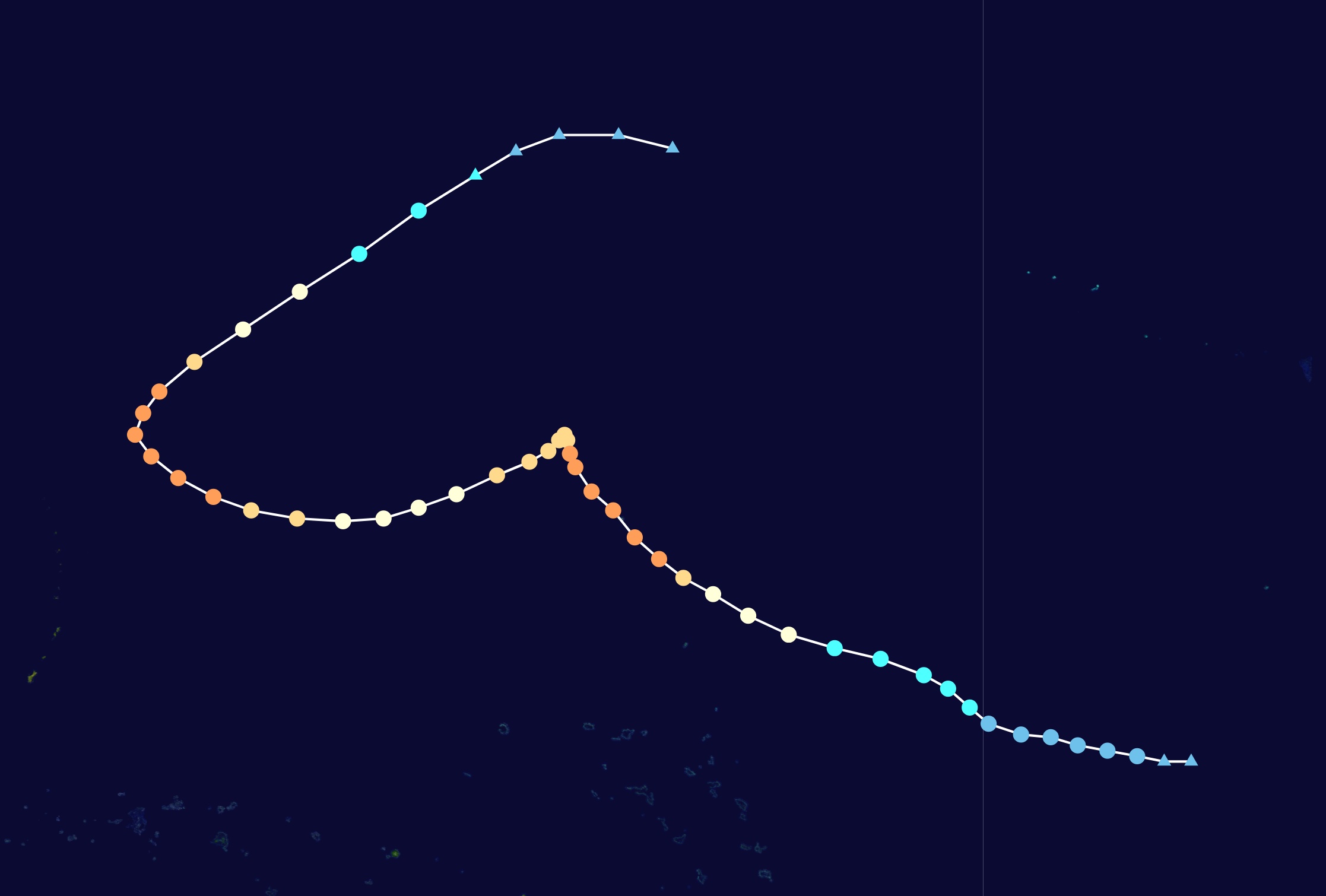
- Duration: October 25 (Entered basin) – November 3
- Peak intensity: 165 km/h (105 mph) (10-min); 935 hPa (mbar)

Dan came nowhere near land.

=== Super Typhoon Elsie (Reming) ===
- Very strong typhoon (JMA)
- Category 5 super typhoon (SSHWS)
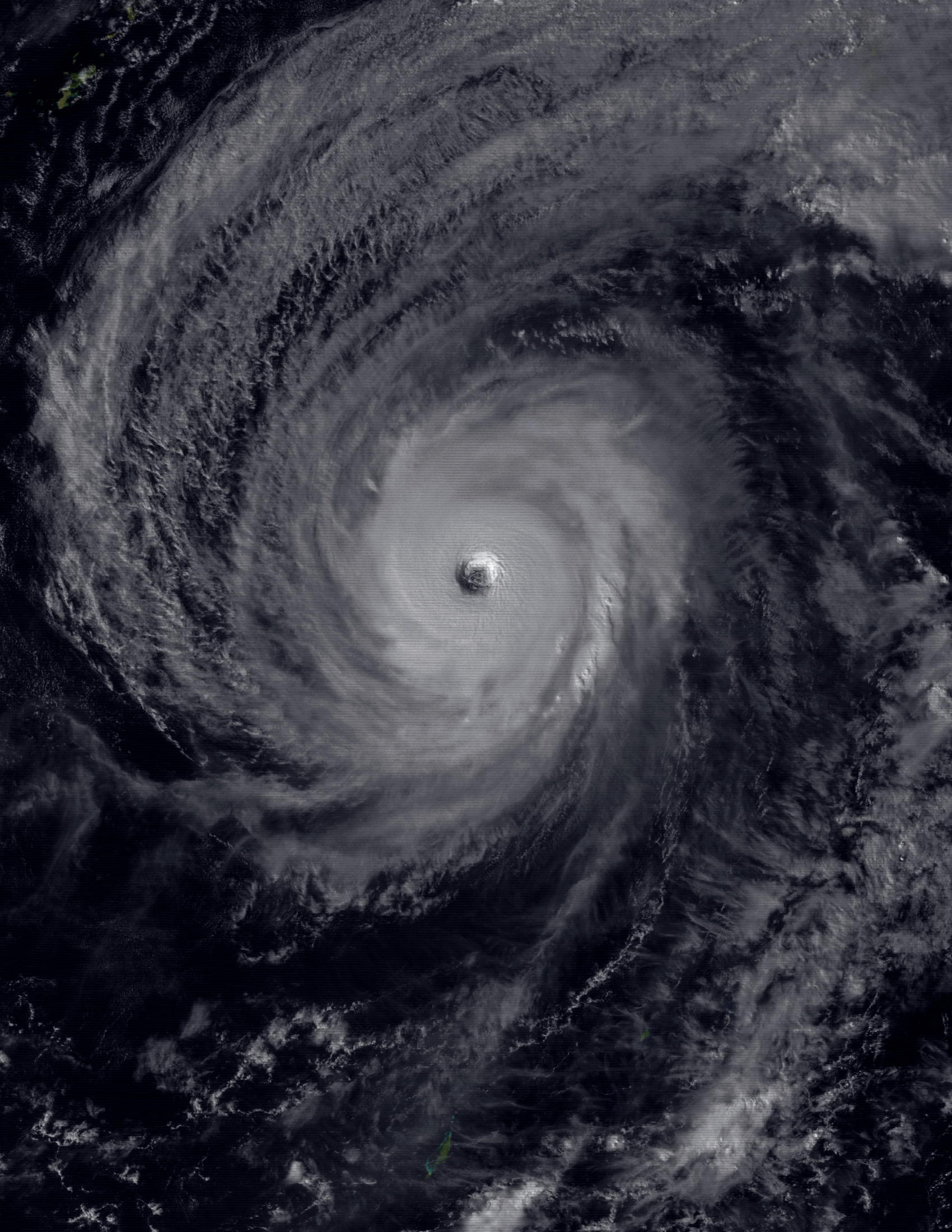
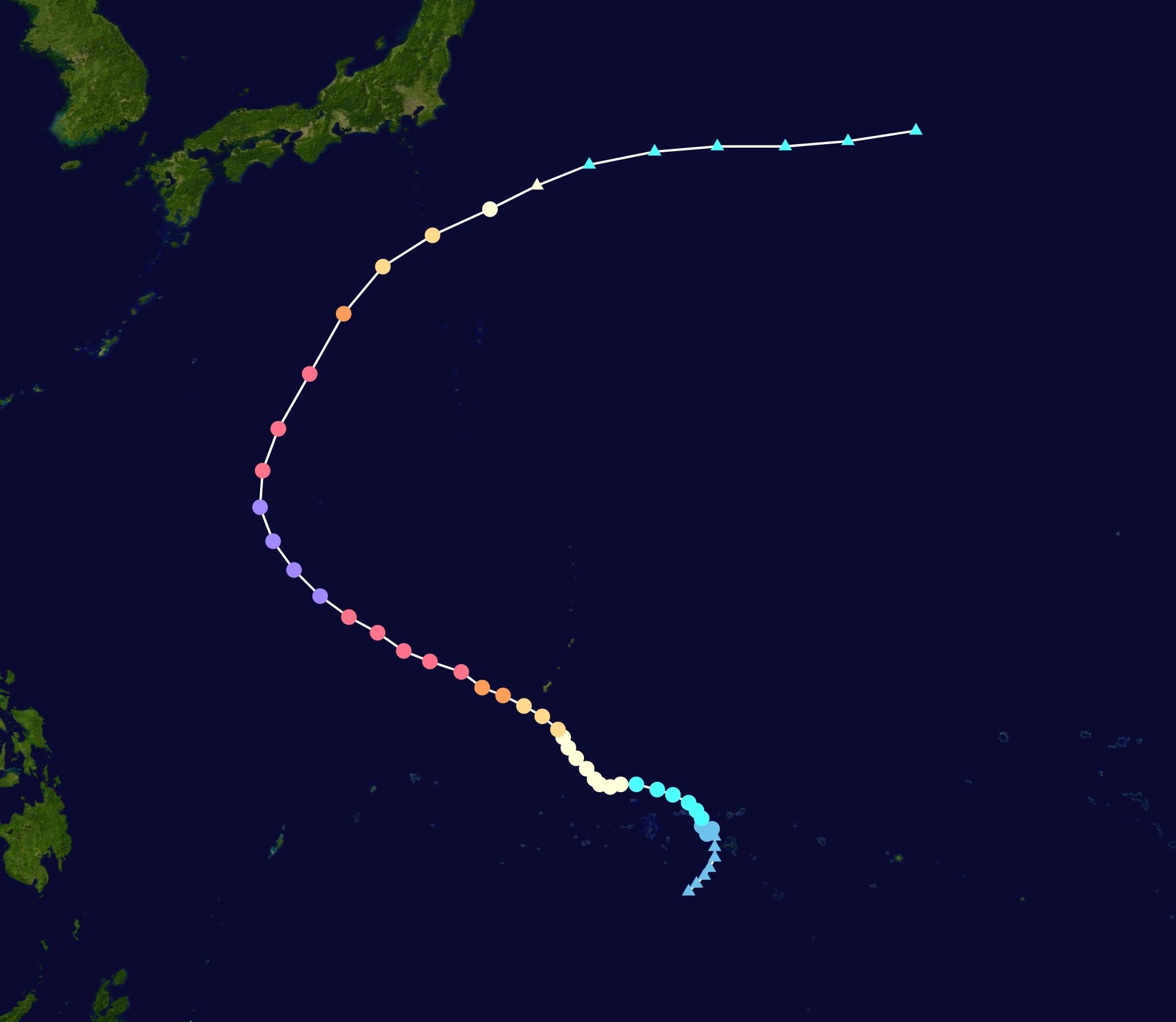
- Duration: October 29 – November 7
- Peak intensity: 185 km/h (115 mph) (10-min); 915 hPa (mbar)

Elsie recurved away from land.

=== Tropical Depression 29W ===
- Tropical depression (JMA)
- Tropical depression (SSHWS)
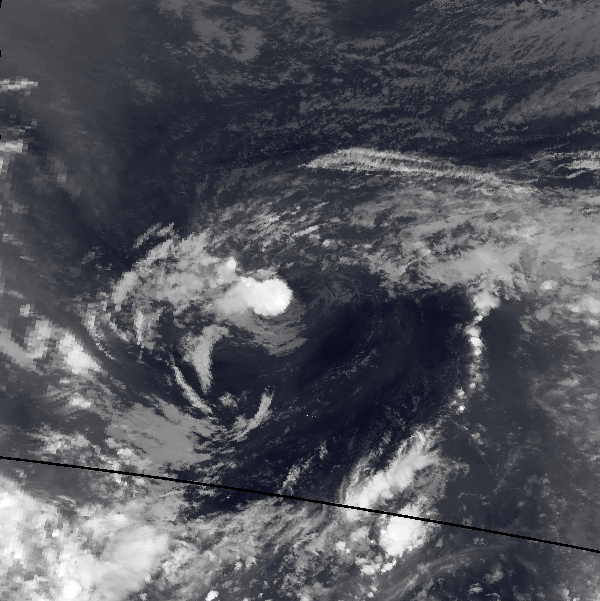
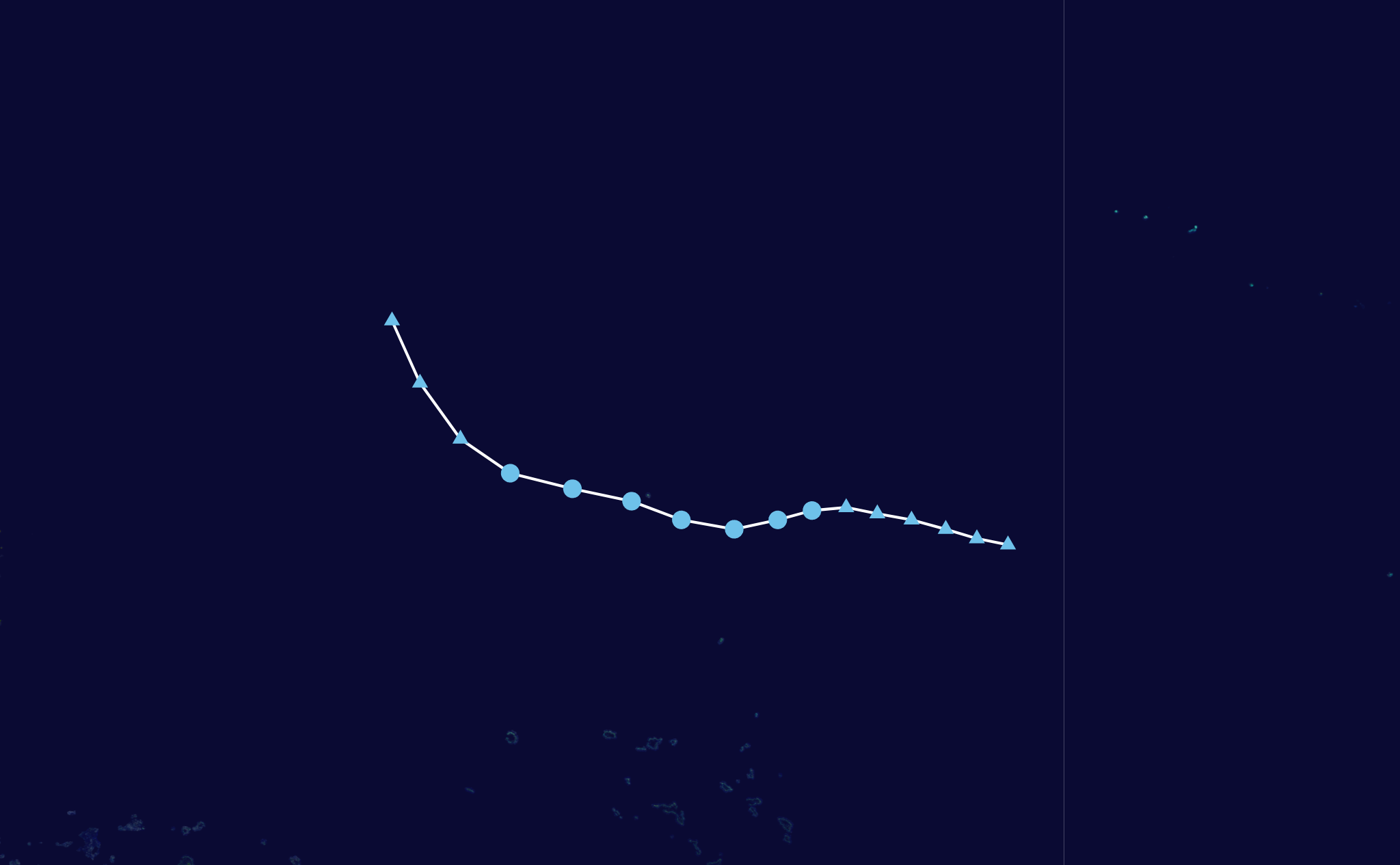
- Duration: October 31 – November 3
- Peak intensity: 45 km/h (30 mph) (1-min); 1004 hPa (mbar)

On October 30, a tropical disturbance began to form west of the International Date Line. The JTWC then issued a Tropical Cyclone Formation Alert late the next day as the system moved westward and started warnings on Tropical Depression 29W on November 1. However, intensification was severely inhibited by outflow from nearby Typhoon Dan, and the depression failed to develop. It passed within 30 nautical miles (56 kilometres) of Wake Island, causing a minor pressure dip and gusts to 32 kn (59 km/h). No damage was reported, due to the relative weakness of 29W as compared to Dan, which ravaged the island 3 days earlier. The depression dissipated on November 2 over open ocean.

=== Tropical Storm Forrest ===
- Tropical storm (JMA)
- Tropical storm (SSHWS)
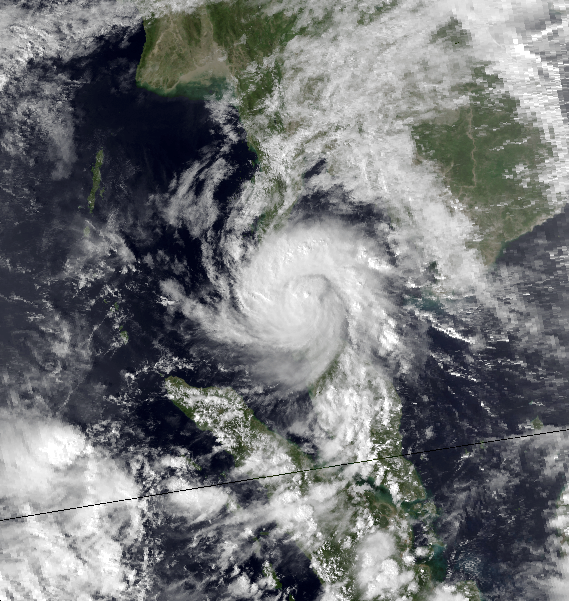
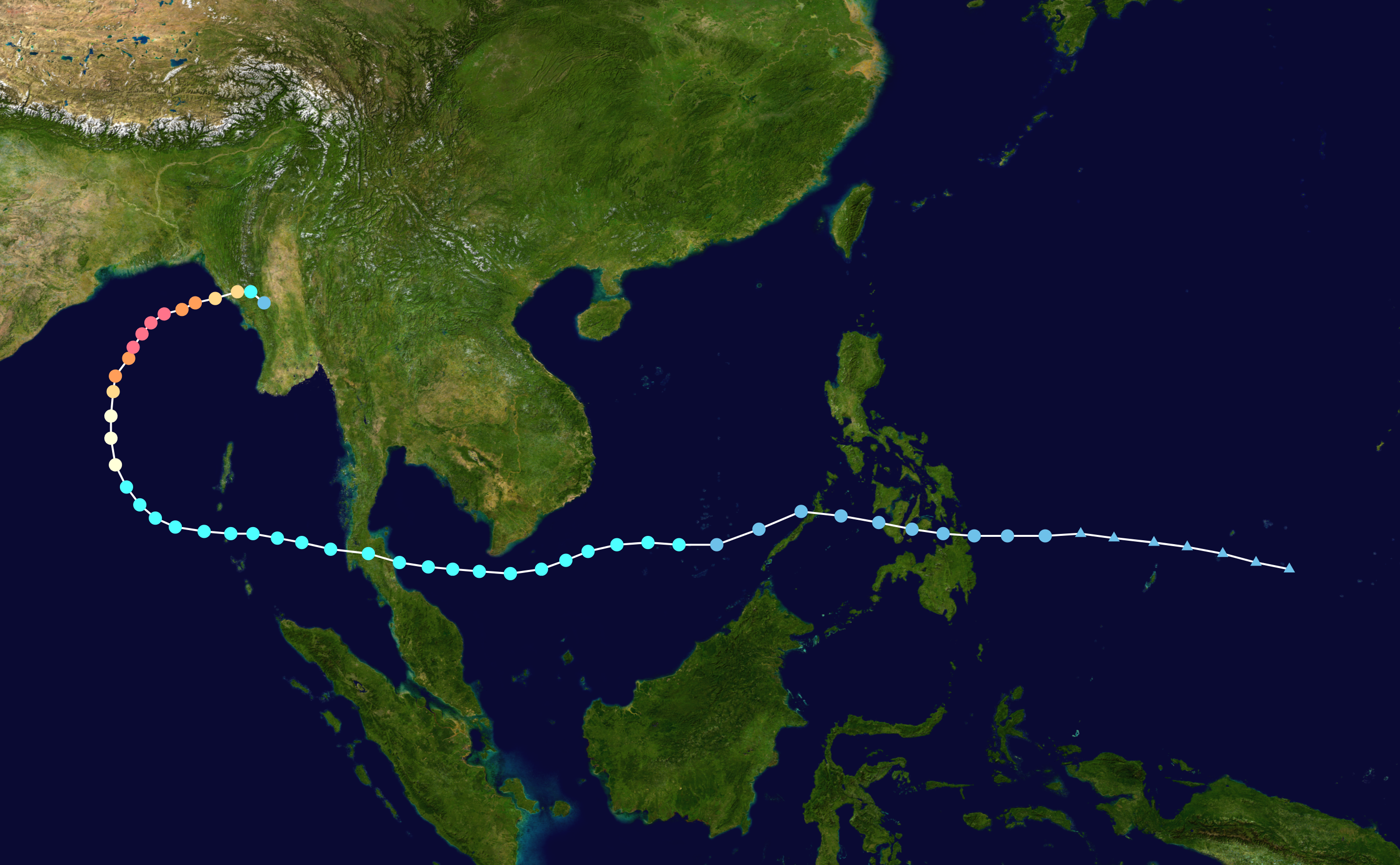
- Duration: November 13 – November 15 (Exited basin)
- Peak intensity: 85 km/h (50 mph) (10-min); 996 hPa (mbar)

On November 8 a tropical depression formed from the monsoon trough east of the Philippines. It crossed the islands, and strengthened to a tropical storm in the South China Sea on the 12th. Forrest continued westward until hitting and crossing the Malay Peninsula on the 15th. It reached a peak of 145 mph (233 km/h) winds in the Bay of Bengal before hitting Myanmar on the 21st.

At least two people were killed by Tropical Storm Forrest and 31 others were reported missing after a ship capsized.

=== Super Typhoon Gay (Seniang) ===
- Violent typhoon (JMA)
- Category 5 super typhoon (SSHWS)
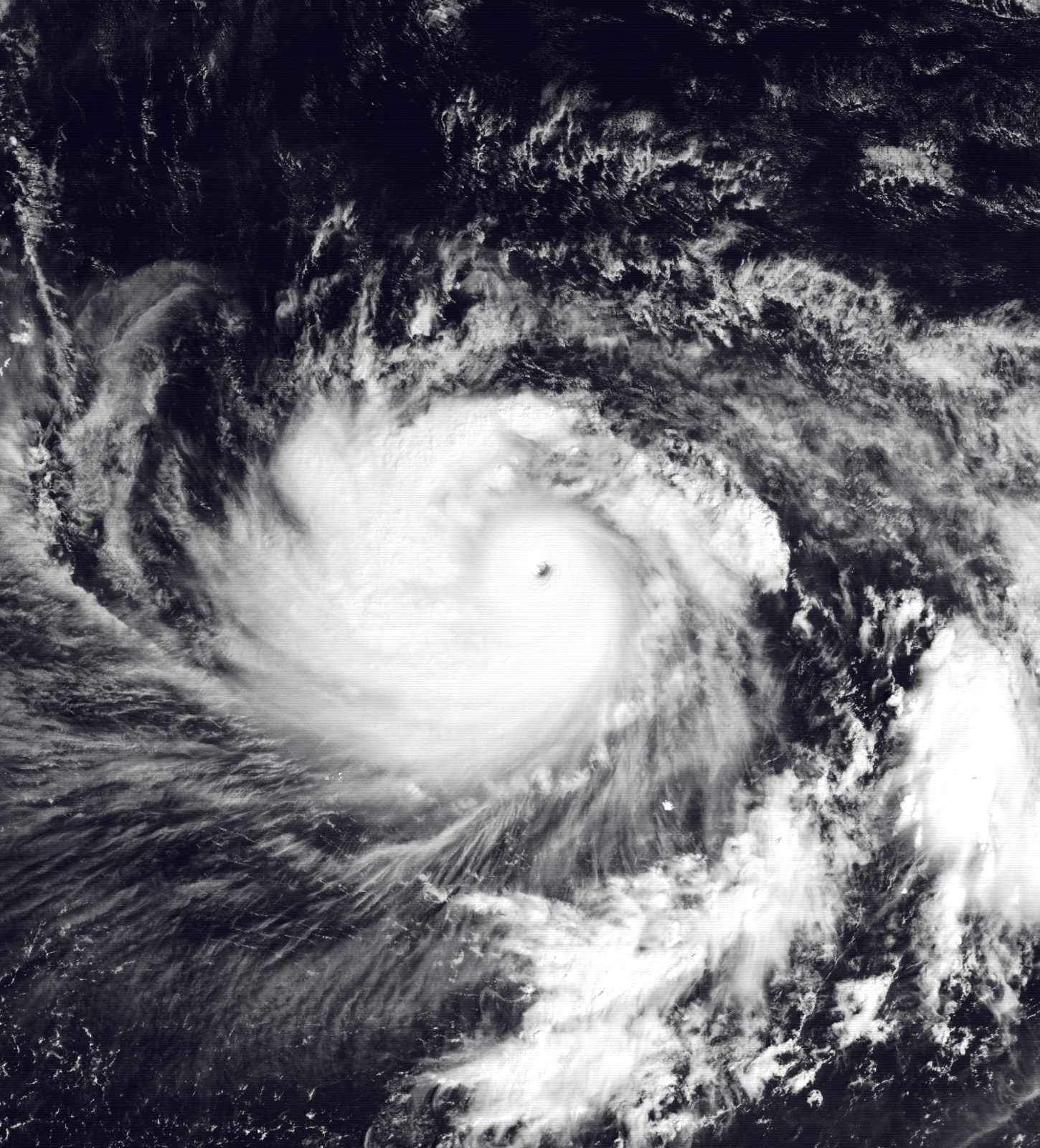
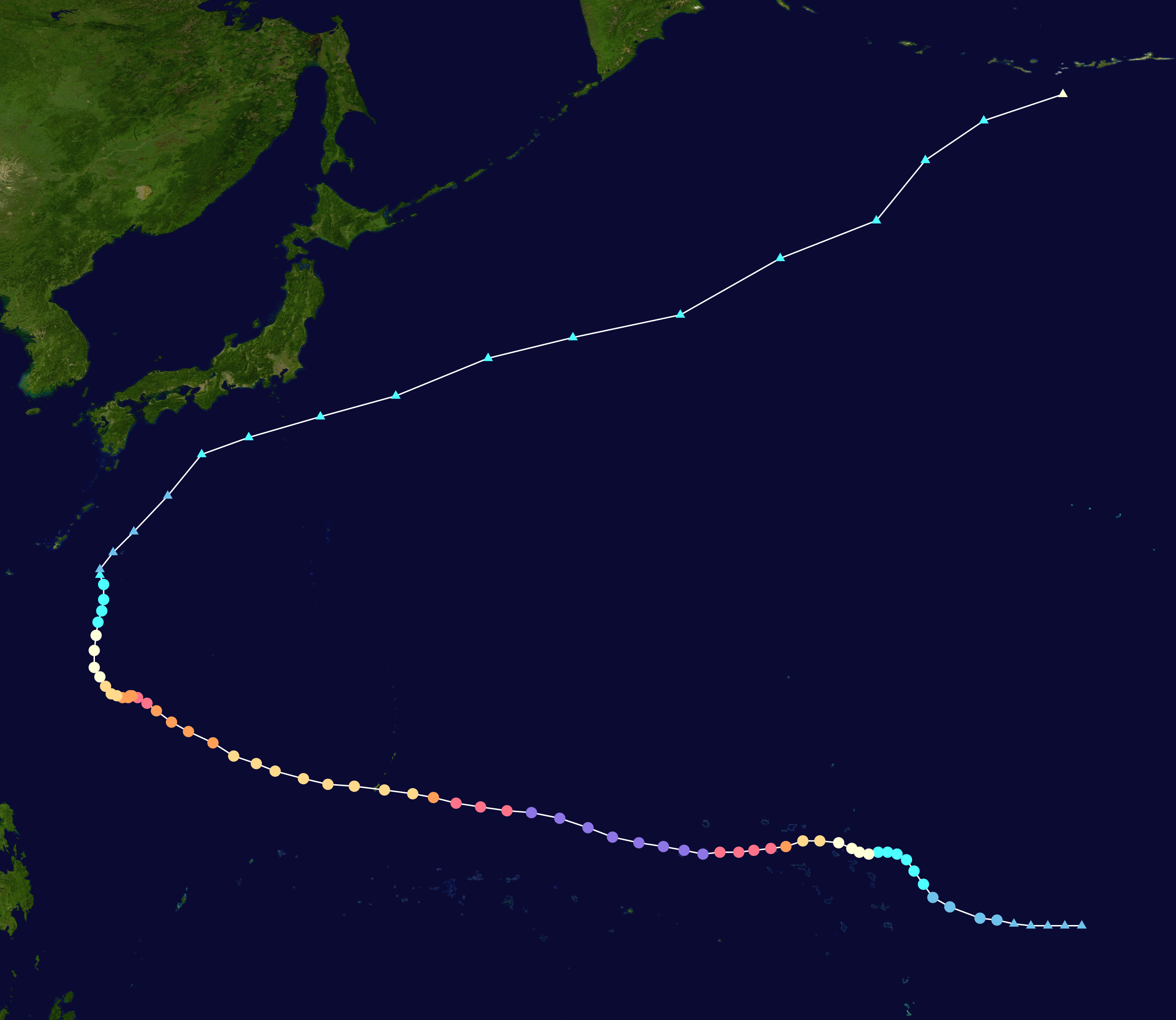
- Duration: November 14 – November 29
- Peak intensity: 205 km/h (125 mph) (10-min); 900 hPa (mbar)

Typhoon Gay was the strongest and longest-lasting storm of the season, forming on November 13 near the International Date Line. As it moved to the west, Gay steadily intensified and moved through the Marshall Islands as an intensifying typhoon. After passing through the country, it intensified its peak intensity over open waters. The JTWC estimated peak winds of 295 km/h (183 mph) and a minimum barometric pressure of 872 mb (25.8 inHg). However, the Japan Meteorological Agency (JMA), which is the official warning center in the western Pacific, estimated winds of 205 km/h (127 mph), with a pressure of 900 mbar (27 inHg). Typhoon Gay weakened rapidly after peaking due to interaction with another typhoon, and it struck Guam with winds of 160 km/h (99 mph) on November 23. The typhoon briefly re-intensified, although it weakened as it turned toward Japan and became extratropical on November 29.

The typhoon first affected the Marshall Islands, where 5,000 people were left homeless and heavy crop damage was reported. The nation's capital of Majuro lost power during the storm and experienced power and water outages. No Marshall Islands citizens were killed, although the typhoon killed a sailor who was traveling around the world. When Gay struck Guam, it became the sixth typhoon of the year to affect the island. Most of the weaker structures were destroyed during Typhoon Omar earlier in the year. Due to its substantial weakening, Gay had a disrupted inner-core that dropped minimal rainfall, which caused extensive defoliation of plants due to salt water scorching. Further north, the typhoon destroyed a house on Saipan from high waves.

=== Super Typhoon Hunt ===
- Very strong typhoon (JMA)
- Category 4 super typhoon (SSHWS)
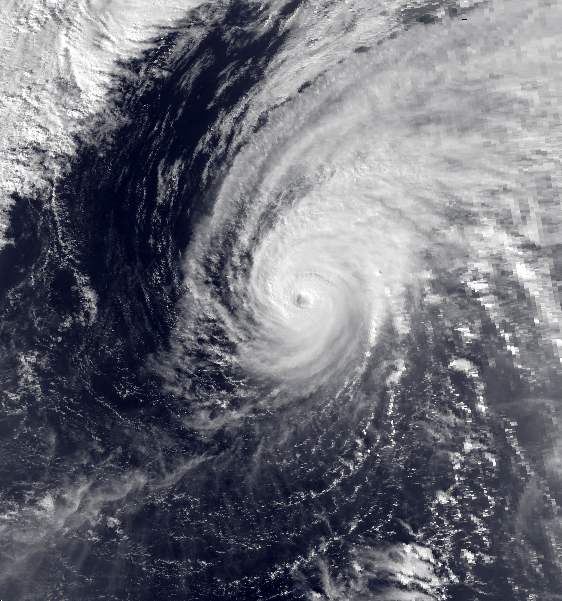
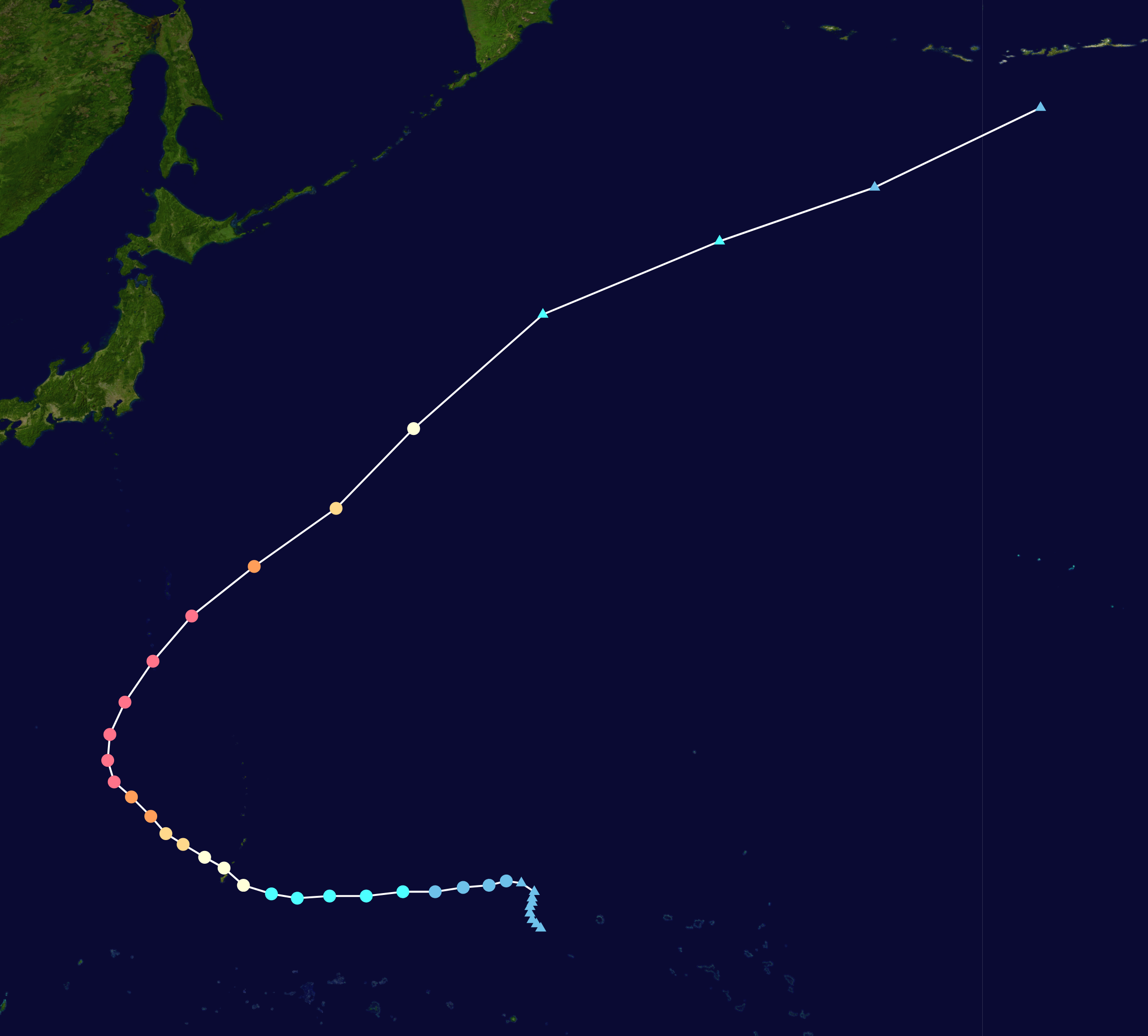
- Duration: November 15 – November 22
- Peak intensity: 165 km/h (105 mph) (10-min); 940 hPa (mbar)

The last storm of the year formed on November 13 and became extratropical on November 22.

== Storm names ==
During the season 31 named tropical cyclones developed in the Western Pacific and were named by the Joint Typhoon Warning Center, when it was determined that they had become tropical storms. These names were contributed to a revised list which started on mid-1989.

Axel	Bobbie	Chuck	Deanna	Eli	Faye	Gary	Helen	Irving	Janis	Kent	Lois	Mark	Nina	Omar	Polly
Ryan	Sibyl	Ted	Val	Ward	Yvette	Zack	Angela	Brian	Colleen	Dan	Elsie	Forrest	Gay	Hunt	

=== Philippines ===
Asiang	Biring	Konsing	Ditang	Edeng
Gloring	Huaning	Isang	Lusing	Maring
Ningning	Osang	Paring	Reming	Seniang
Toyang (unused)	Ulpiang (unused)	Welpring (unused)	Yerling (unused)	
Auxiliary list
				Apiang (unused)
Basiang (unused)	Kayang (unused)	Dorang (unused)	Enang (unused)	Grasing (unused)

The Philippine Atmospheric, Geophysical and Astronomical Services Administration uses its own naming scheme for tropical cyclones in their area of responsibility. PAGASA assigns names to tropical depressions that form within their area of responsibility and any tropical cyclone that might move into their area of responsibility. Should the list of names for a given year prove to be insufficient, names are taken from an auxiliary list, the first 6 of which are published each year before the season starts. Names not retired from this list will be used again in the 1996 season. This is the same list used for the 1988 season, except for Ulpiang and Yerling, which replaced Unsang and Yoning. PAGASA uses its own naming scheme that starts in the Filipino alphabet, with names of Filipino female names ending with "ng" (A, B, K, D, etc.). Names that were not assigned/going to use are marked in gray.

=== Retirement ===
Due to extensive damage caused by Omar in Guam, the name was later retired and was replaced by Oscar and was first used in the 1995 season.

== Season effects ==
This table summarizes all the systems that developed within or moved into the North Pacific Ocean, to the west of the International Date Line during 1992. The tables also provide an overview of a systems intensity, duration, land areas affected and any deaths or damages associated with the system.

Name	Dates	Peak intensity			Areas affected	Damage (USD)	Deaths	Ref(s).
Name	Dates	Category	Wind speed	Pressure	Areas affected	Damage (USD)	Deaths	Ref(s).
Axel	January 4 – 15	Severe tropical storm	100 km/h (62 mph)	980 hPa (28.94 inHg)	Marshall Islands, Caroline Islands, Mariana Islands	$1 million	None	
Ekeka	February 3 – 8	Tropical storm	85 km/h (53 mph)	990 hPa (29.23 inHg)	Marshall Islands	None	None	
Bobbie (Asiang)	June 23 – 30	Very strong typhoon	165 km/h (103 mph)	940 hPa (27.76 inHg)	Philippines, Japan	$27.2 million	None	
Chuck (Biring)	June 24 – July 1	Typhoon	130 km/h (81 mph)	965 hPa (28.50 inHg)	Philippines, South China, Vietnam	$40.5 million	22	
Deanna	June 28 – July 3	Tropical depression	75 km/h (47 mph)	1002 hPa (29.59 inHg)	Caroline Islands	None	None	
Eli (Konsing)	July 8 – 14	Typhoon	130 km/h (81 mph)	965 hPa (28.50 inHg)	Caroline Islands, Philippines, South China, Vietnam	$272 million	4	
Faye	July 15 – 18	Tropical storm	65 km/h (40 mph)	1000 hPa (29.53 inHg)	Philippines, South China	$1.03 million	2	
Gary (Ditang)	July 17 – 24	Severe tropical storm	100 km/h (62 mph)	980 hPa (28.94 inHg)	Marshall Islands, Caroline Islands, Mariana Islands	$940 million	48	
Helen	July 26 – 28	Tropical storm	75 km/h (47 mph)	996 hPa (29.41 inHg)	None	None	None	
TD	July 29	Tropical depression	Not specified	1010 hPa (29.83 inHg)	None	None	None	
TD	July 30 – 31	Tropical depression	Not specified	1012 hPa (29.89 inHg)	None	None	None	
Irving (Edeng)	July 31 – August 5	Severe tropical storm	100 km/h (62 mph)	980 hPa (28.94 inHg)	Japan, South Korea	$4.74 million	2	
Janis (Gloring)	August 3 – 9	Very strong typhoon	175 km/h (109 mph)	935 hPa (27.61 inHg)	Caroline Islands, Mariana Islands, Japan	$584 million	13	
Kent	August 6 – 19	Very strong typhoon	175 km/h (109 mph)	930 hPa (27.46 inHg)	Marshall Islands, Japan	$15 million	8	
Lois (Huaning)	August 14 – 21	Tropical storm	65 km/h (40 mph)	996 hPa (29.41 inHg)	None	None	None	
Mark	August 15 – 19	Tropical storm	85 km/h (53 mph)	990 hPa (29.23 inHg)	China, Taiwan	$10.4 million	1	
Nina	August 17 – 21	Tropical storm	65 km/h (40 mph)	996 hPa (29.41 inHg)	None	None	None	
TD	August 23 – 24	Tropical depression	Not specified	1008 hPa (29.77 inHg)	Japan	None	None	
Omar (Lusing)	August 24 – September 9	Very strong typhoon	185 km/h (115 mph)	920 hPa (27.17 inHg)	Marshall Islands, Caroline Islands, Mariana Islands, Philippines, Taiwan, China, Ryukyu Islands	$561 million	15	
TD	August 25 – 26	Tropical depression	Not specified	1000 hPa (29.53 inHg)	None	None	None	
Polly (Isang)	August 27 – September 1	Severe tropical storm	100 km/h (62 mph)	975 hPa (28.79 inHg)	Taiwan, Ryukyu Islands, China	$450 million	202	
Ryan	September 1 – 11	Very strong typhoon	155 km/h (96 mph)	945 hPa (27.91 inHg)	Mariana Islands, Japan	$110 million	1	
Sibyl	September 4 – 15	Very strong typhoon	155 km/h (96 mph)	940 hPa (27.76 inHg)	None	None	None	
Ted (Maring)	September 18 – 24	Severe tropical storm	95 km/h (59 mph)	985 hPa (29.09 inHg)	Philippines, Taiwan, East China, Korean Peninsula	$360 million	61	
TD	September 19 – 20	Tropical depression	Not specified	1004 hPa (29.65 inHg)	South China, Vietnam	None	None	
Val	September 24 – 27	Tropical storm	85 km/h (53 mph)	990 hPa (29.23 inHg)	None	None	None	
Ward	September 27 – October 6	Very strong typhoon	155 km/h (96 mph)	945 hPa (27.91 inHg)	None	None	None	
TD	October 7	Tropical depression	Not specified	1008 hPa (29.77 inHg)	Vietnam	None	None	
Yvette (Ningning)	October 7 – 17	Very strong typhoon	185 km/h (115 mph)	915 hPa (27.02 inHg)	Philippines	None	None	
Zack	October 8 – 16	Tropical storm	75 km/h (47 mph)	992 hPa (29.29 inHg)	Marshall Islands	None	None	
Angela (Osang)	October 15 – 30	Typhoon	120 km/h (75 mph)	970 hPa (28.94 inHg)	Philippines, Vietnam, Cambodia, Thailand, Malaysia	Unknown	49	
Brian	October 17 – 25	Typhoon	150 km/h (93 mph)	950 hPa (28.05 inHg)	Caroline Islands, Mariana Islands	None	None	
Colleen (Paring)	October 17 – 29	Severe tropical storm	100 km/h (62 mph)	985 hPa (29.09 inHg)	Philippines, Vietnam, Cambodia, Laos, Thailand, Myanmar	Unknown	Unknown	
Dan	October 25 – November 3	Very strong typhoon	165 km/h (103 mph)	935 hPa (27.61 inHg)	Marshall Islands	None	None	
Elsie (Reming)	October 29 – November 7	Typhoon	150 km/h (93 mph)	950 hPa (28.05 inHg)	Caroline Islands, Mariana Islands	None	None	
29W	October 31 – November 2	Tropical depression	45 km/h (28 mph)	1004 hPa (29.65 inHg)	None	None	None	
TD	November 10 – 11	Tropical depression	Not specified	1008 hPa (29.77 inHg)	Philippines	None	None	
Forrest	November 13 – 15	Tropical storm	75 km/h (47 mph)	992 hPa (29.29 inHg)	Vietnam, Thailand, Myanmar (before crossover)	None	2	
Gay (Seniang)	November 14 – 29	Violent typhoon	205 km/h (127 mph)	900 hPa (26.58 inHg)	Marshall Islands, Caroline Islands, Mariana Islands, Guam, Japan, Aleutian Islands	None	1	
Hunt	November 15 – 21	Very strong typhoon	165 km/h (103 mph)	940 hPa (27.76 inHg)	Mariana Islands	None	None	
Season aggregates
40 systems	January 4 – November 29, 1992		205 km/h (127 mph)	900 hPa (26.58 inHg)		$3.38 billion	431	

== See also ==
- 1992 Pacific hurricane season
- 1992 Atlantic hurricane season
- 1992 North Indian cyclone season
- List of wettest tropical cyclones
- South-West Indian Ocean cyclone season: 1991–92, 1992–93
- Australian region cyclone season: 1991–92, 1992–93
- South Pacific cyclone season: 1991–92, 1992–93
