= Cyclone Nina =

Southern Pacific cyclone in 1992 and 1993

Severe Tropical Cyclone Nina
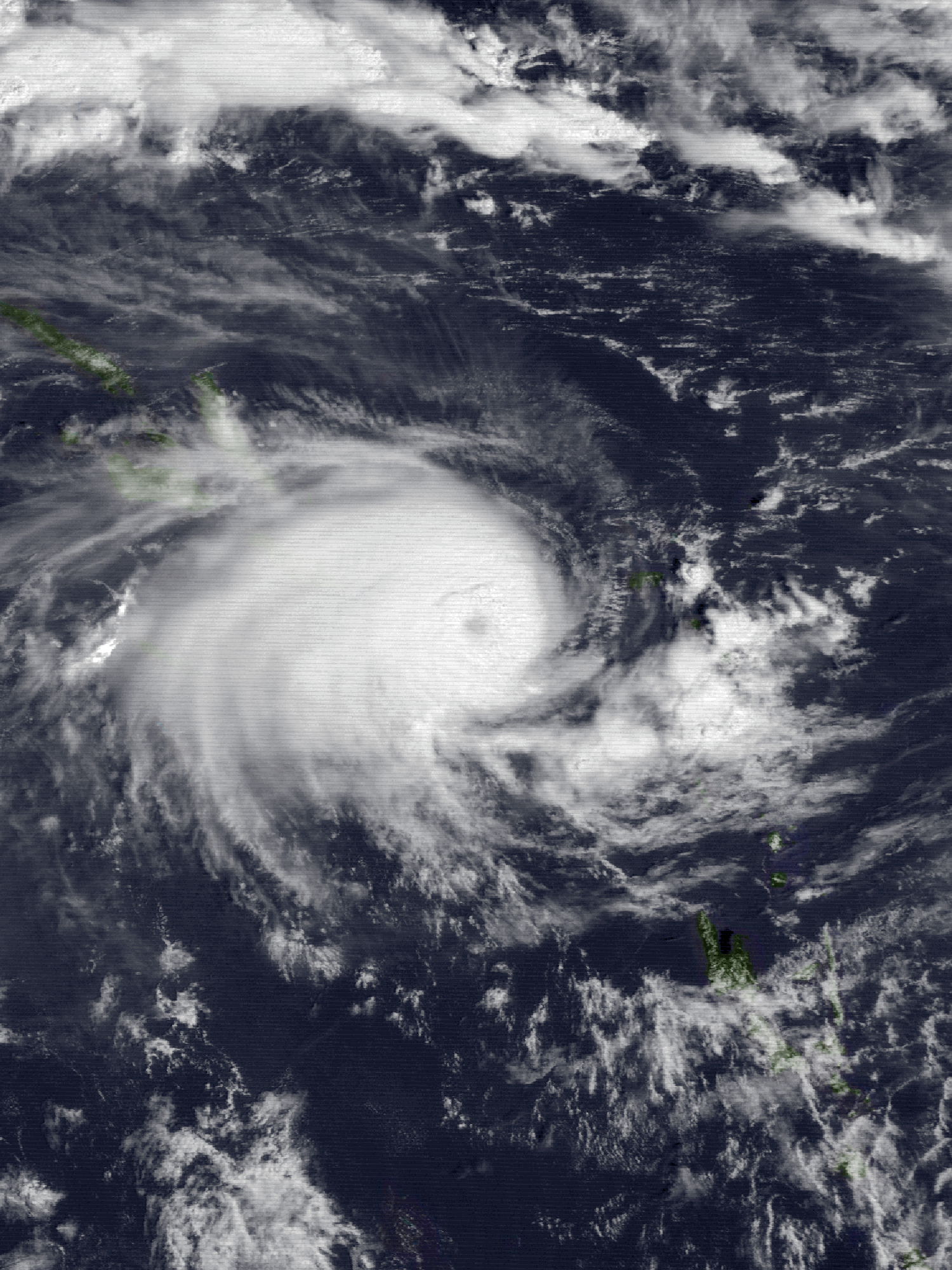
- Cyclone Nina approaching the Santa Cruz Islands on 2 January

Meteorological history
- Formed: 22 December 1992
- Remnant low: 4 January 1993
- Dissipated: 5 January 1993

Category 4 severe tropical cyclone
- 10-minute sustained (BOM)
- Highest winds: 165 km/h (105 mph)
- Lowest pressure: 960 hPa (mbar); 28.35 inHg

Category 3 severe tropical cyclone
- 10-minute sustained (FMS)
- Highest winds: 140 km/h (85 mph)
- Lowest pressure: 960 hPa (mbar); 28.35 inHg

Category 1-equivalent tropical cyclone
- 1-minute sustained (SSHWS/JTWC)
- Highest winds: 140 km/h (85 mph)
- Lowest pressure: 967 hPa (mbar); 28.56 inHg

Overall effects
- Fatalities: 3 total
- Damage: ≥$50,000 (1993 USD)
- Areas affected: Queensland; Solomon Islands; Rotuma; Wallis and Futuna; Tuvalu; Tonga; Niue
- IBTrACS
- Part of the 1992–93 Australian region and South Pacific cyclone seasons

Severe Tropical Cyclone Nina was a significant tropical cyclone which impacted six island nations from December 1992 to January 1993. The system was first noted as a tropical low over the Cape York Peninsula in Queensland, Australia, on 21 December. Over the next few days, the system moved south-westwards into the Gulf of Carpentaria. The low developed into a tropical cyclone and was named Nina on 23 December. The system was subsequently steered south-eastwards by an upper-level trough of low pressure, before it made landfall as a Category 2 tropical cyclone on the Cape York Peninsula near Cape Keerweer on 25 December. Over land, the system weakened into a tropical low before it regenerated into a tropical cyclone over the Coral Sea on 28 December. The system subsequently moved north-eastwards, under the influence of Cyclone Kina and an upper-level ridge of high pressure. During 1 January 1993, Nina peaked with sustained wind speeds of 140 km/h (85 mph), as it affected Rennell, Bellona and Temotu provinces in the Solomon Islands. The system subsequently gradually weakened as it accelerated eastwards and affected Rotuma, Wallis and Futuna, Tonga and Niue. Nina was subsequently absorbed by Kina near the Southern Cook Islands during 5 January.

== Meteorological history ==
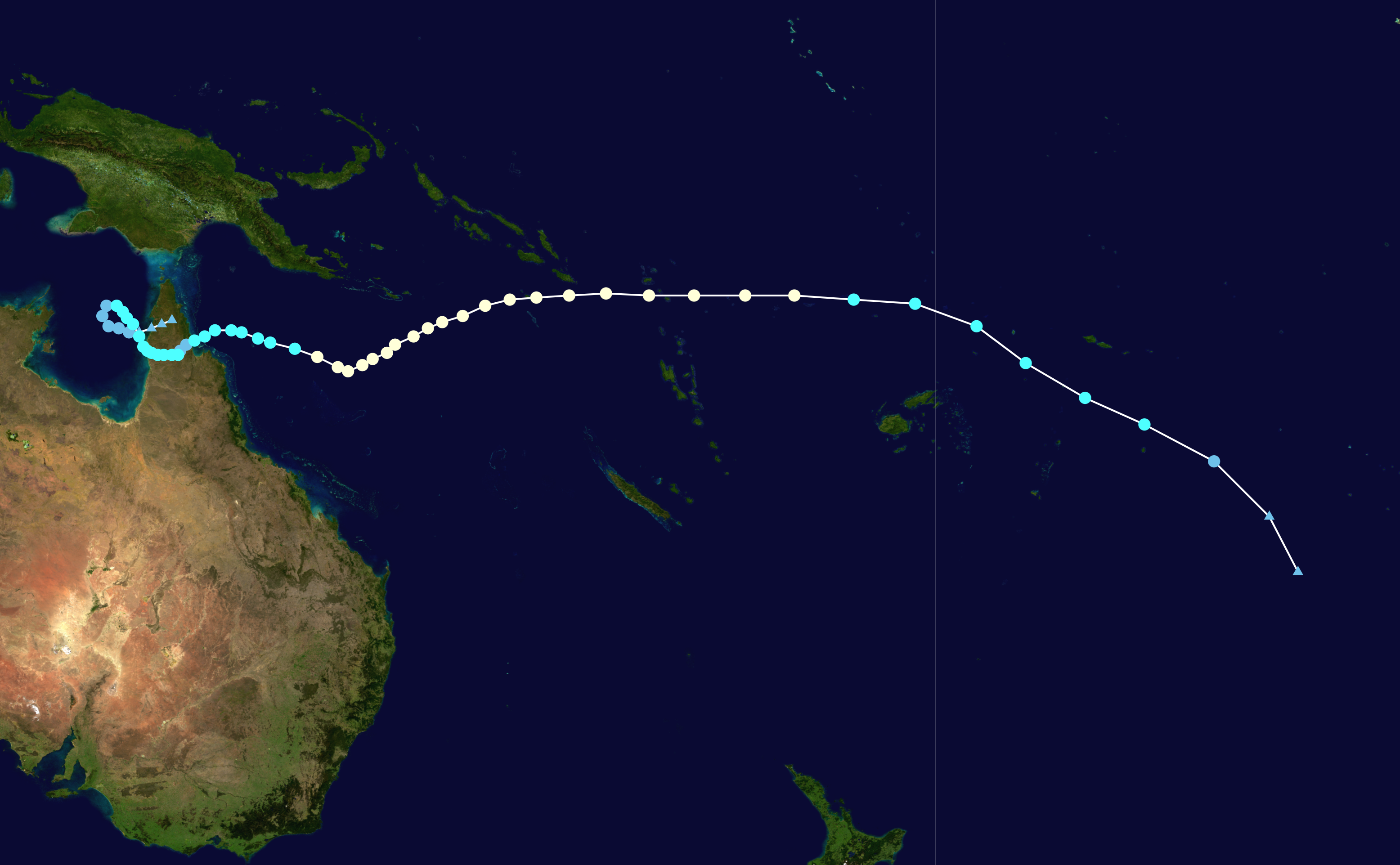
Map plotting the storm's track and intensity, according to the Saffir–Simpson scale Map key Saffir–Simpson scale Tropical depression (≤38 mph, ≤62 km/h) Tropical storm (39–73 mph, 63–118 km/h) Category 1 (74–95 mph, 119–153 km/h) Category 2 (96–110 mph, 154–177 km/h) Category 3 (111–129 mph, 178–208 km/h) Category 4 (130–156 mph, 209–251 km/h) Category 5 (≥157 mph, ≥252 km/h) Unknown Storm type Tropical cyclone Subtropical cyclone Extratropical cyclone, remnant low, tropical disturbance, or monsoon depression

During the middle of December 1992, an active phase of the Madden–Julian oscillation took place which helped to reinforce atmospheric convection across Northern Australia and the western Pacific Ocean. A tropical low subsequently developed within this area of atmospheric convection and moved south-westwards into the warm waters of the Gulf of Carpentaria during 22 December. During the following day, the United States Joint Typhoon Warning Center initiated advisories on the low and designated it as Tropical Cyclone 03P before the Australian Bureau of Meteorology named the system: Nina, after it had developed into a Category 1 tropical cyclone on the Australian tropical cyclone intensity scale.

Over the next day the system continued to intensify before both the JTWC and the BoM reported that Nina had peaked with winds of 100 km/h (65 mph) during 25 December, which made it a category 2 tropical cyclone on the Australian scale. The system subsequently made landfall on the Cape York Peninsula during that day near Cape Keerweer, where it weakened into a tropical low and emerged into the Coral Sea on 27 December.

The system re-intensified into a tropical cyclone during 28 December, as it moved north-eastwards, under the influence of Cyclone Kina and an upper level ridge of high pressure. Over the next few days, the system continued to re-intensify as it moved north-eastwards, before both the JTWC and the BoM reported that Nina had peaked with winds of 140 km/h (85 mph). This made it a Category 3 severe tropical cyclone on the Australian scale and equivalent to a category 1 hurricane on the Saffir–Simpson hurricane wind scale. On 1 January, Nina passed over Rennell Island at its peak intensity, as it moved into the South Pacific basin. Over the next few days, the system gradually weakened, as it accelerated eastwards through Temotu Province and around the eastern side of Kina. During 3 January, Nina passed to the north of the Fijian dependency of Rotuma, before it passed in between the islands of Wallis and Futuna. During the next day the system weakened into a tropical low, as it turned south-eastwards and passed in between Tonga and Niue, before it was absorbed into Kina's circulation, while both systems were located near the Southern Cook Islands during 5 January.

== Preparations and impact ==
Cyclone Nina impacted the Gulf of Carpentaria, the Cape York Peninsula, Niue, Rotuma, Tonga, Tuvalu, the Solomon Islands, Wallis and Futuna. Due to the impact of this system, the name Nina was subsequently retired, from the list of names for the Australian region by the World Meteorological Organization.

=== Gulf of Carpentaria ===
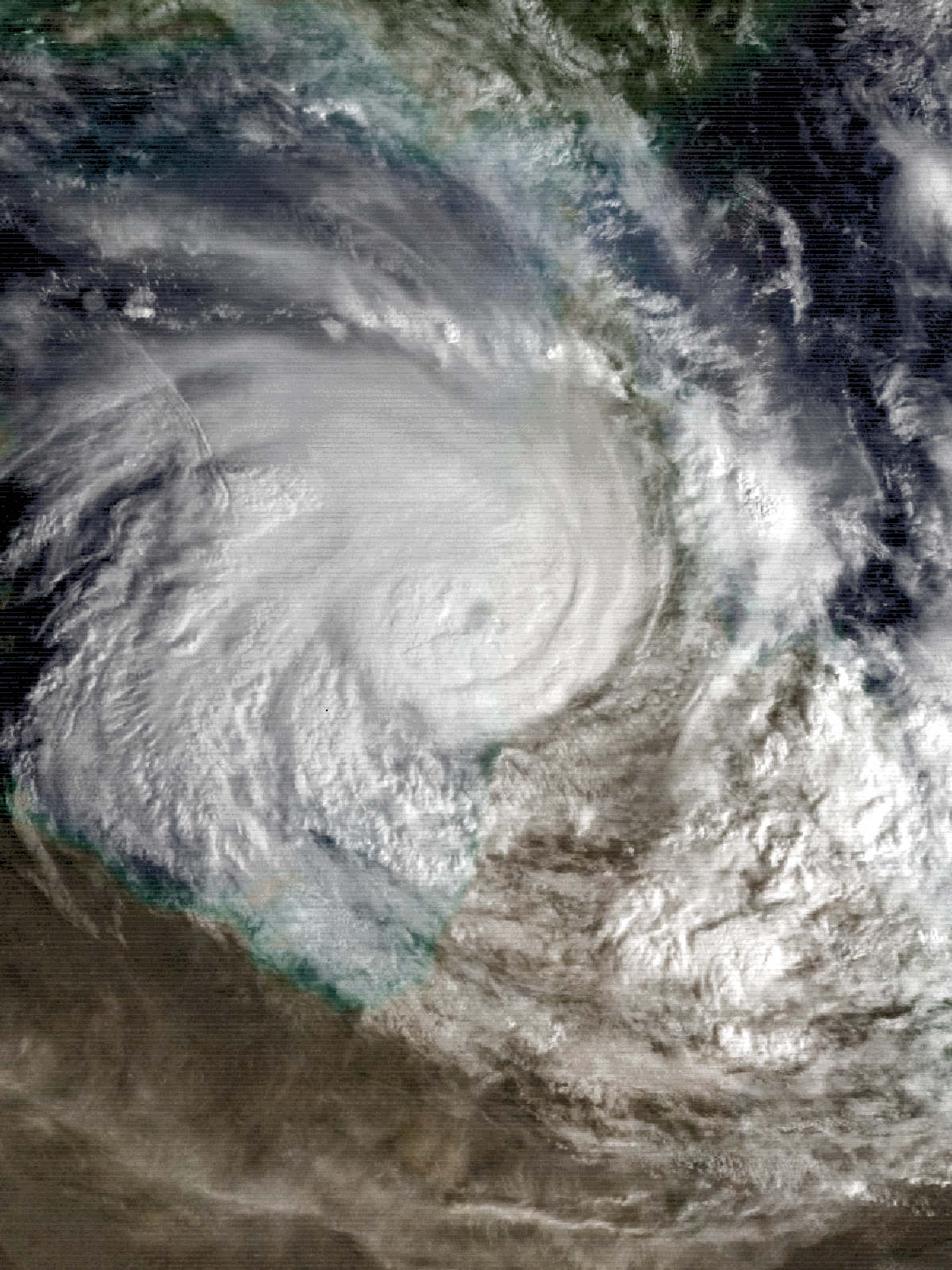
Nina at its first peak intensity on 25 December

As Nina developed in the Gulf of Carpentaria, tropical cyclone watches and warnings were issued, for parts of the Northern Territory and Queensland. These areas included Nhulunbuy in the Northern Territory, Mapoon, Aurukun and the Lockhart River in Queensland. The system subsequently moved eastwards and affected sparsely populated and uninhabited areas of the Cape York Peninsula, where torrential rainfall was recorded on 25 December. As a result of Nina impacting Queensland, the State Disaster Coordination Centre in Brisbane operated around the clock, while SES units, local authorities and disaster district coordinators in the region were put on full alert. Ahead of the system affecting Port Stewart, ten members of a twenty-member fishing party were evacuated to safety while the other ten refused to be evacuated. As a result, they were left stranded at the port, by the swollen Stewart River and its flooded tributaries until a rescue helicopter rescued them. Within the Aurukun Aboriginal community and Pormpuraaw widespread damage to trees were reported, while four houses were damaged by flying tree branches.

=== Solomon Islands ===
After impacting Queensland, Nina impacted the Solomon Islands between 30 December and 3 January, where it caused extensive damage to southern and eastern islands including Rennell and Bellona. Islanders were caught almost unprepared for Nina, because of preparations for the traditional New Year Celebrations. There were 3 people killed in the islands with an elderly woman killed on Bellona after she was trapped under a collapsed house while twins born at the height also died from lack of warm dry linen and shelter. The only buildings left standing were the Australian built Seventh Day Adventist churches in these islands.

The Solomon Islands Government declared parts of Rennell and Bellona, Southern Guadalcanal, Temotu, Makira and Malaita Provinces disaster areas. The Government subsequently shipped and airlifted relief materials to the affected areas, including food supplies, medical supplies, tarpaulins and water. The Solomon Islands Red Cross also helped with the relief effort and dispatched 113 tarpaulins to four provinces to shelter the homeless, along with blankets, clothing and various household items. They used reserve funds in order to transport these supplies to the islands affected by canoe and plane. The Government of the Solomon Islands subsequently launched an appeal for international assistance, with food assistance, tarpaulins, tents, water containers and chainsaws amongst the things asked for. A need also existed for helicopters and aircraft services, in order for field assessments to take place and the transportation of water engineers.

=== Rotuma, Wallis and Futuna, Samoa and Tonga ===
Ahead of the system affecting Rotuma, a storm force wind warning was issued for Rotuma, with sustained wind speeds of 95 km/h (60 mph) and wind gusts of up to 140 km/h (85 mph) were forecast to occur. However, the system only had a minimal effect on Rotuma, with a few rain showers and sustained winds of 45 km/h (30 mph) occurring for a brief period. In conjunction with Kina, Nina affected Wallis and Futuna between 3–4 January, however, there were no tropical cyclone warnings were issued for the French Territory by the FMS. Kina affected the island of Futuna during 3 January, where sustained winds of up to 53 km/h (33 mph) and wind gusts of up to 69 km/h (43 mph) were recorded. Nina affected Wallis Island later that day where sustained winds of up to 80 km/h (50 mph) and wind gusts of up to 68 km/h (42 mph) were recorded. Within the islands some damage to crops and houses was reported.

Ahead of Nina affecting the Samoan Islands, residents living near the sea were warned to move inland, while ships were ordered to remain in port. The system subsequently passed to the south of the Samoan Islands during 4 January, where it brought high winds and caused wind gusts of 95 km/h (60 mph) at Pago Pago in American Samoa. Some minor damage to roofs, bananas and breadfruit was reported, while total damages in American Samoa to both property and crops were estimated at between $50,000 and $500,000.

Nina affected Northern Tonga on 4 January, just after Kina had affected Tonga's southern islands with hurricane-force winds. Ahead of Nina affecting the islands, a gale warning was issued for the islands of Niuafo'ou and Keppel, where some damage to houses and crops were recorded. A gale warning was also issued for the island nation of Niue on the same day (4 January), where winds of up to 75 km/h (45 mph) caused damage to the island nations port.

=== Tuvalu ===
After Cyclone Joni had affected Tuvalu during the previous month, Nina and Kina indirectly impacted the island nation during the opening days of January 1993. The systems contributed to the strength of the westerly winds that were already present over the islands, with winds of up to 130 km/h (80 mph) reported throughout the islands. As these winds combined with a heavy westerly swell and high seas, where they caused flooding of up to 2 ft (0.61 m) over the islands of Nanumea, Nanumaga, Niutao, Nui and Vaitupu. As a result, damage was reported to crops and several buildings in the island nation, including thirty houses. The two cyclones caused a severe amount of erosion in the island nation, with the shoreline on Vaitupu, receding by about 5–6 m (16–20 ft). The Vaitupu Fisheries Harbour, that had only just been built during 1992, was seriously damaged by waves attributed to the two cyclones.

On the island of Nanumea, a poorly designed sea wall trapped the storm surge on the island, which caused salt water contamination of the island vegetation and killed several trees. An appeal for international assistance was subsequently made by the Government of Tuvalu, as supplies of food and other essentials like petrol and kerosene on the worst affected islands were running low. International assistance was subsequently provided, by the United Nations Department of Humanitarian Affairs, who provided an emergency grant of US$10,000. The European Commission also provided emergency aid to Tuvalu which enabled the Red Cross, to provide foodstuffs, shelter, medical supplies and utensils to people whose homes were destroyed.

== See also ==
- Cyclone Evan
