= 1992–93 South Pacific cyclone season =

Tropical cyclone season

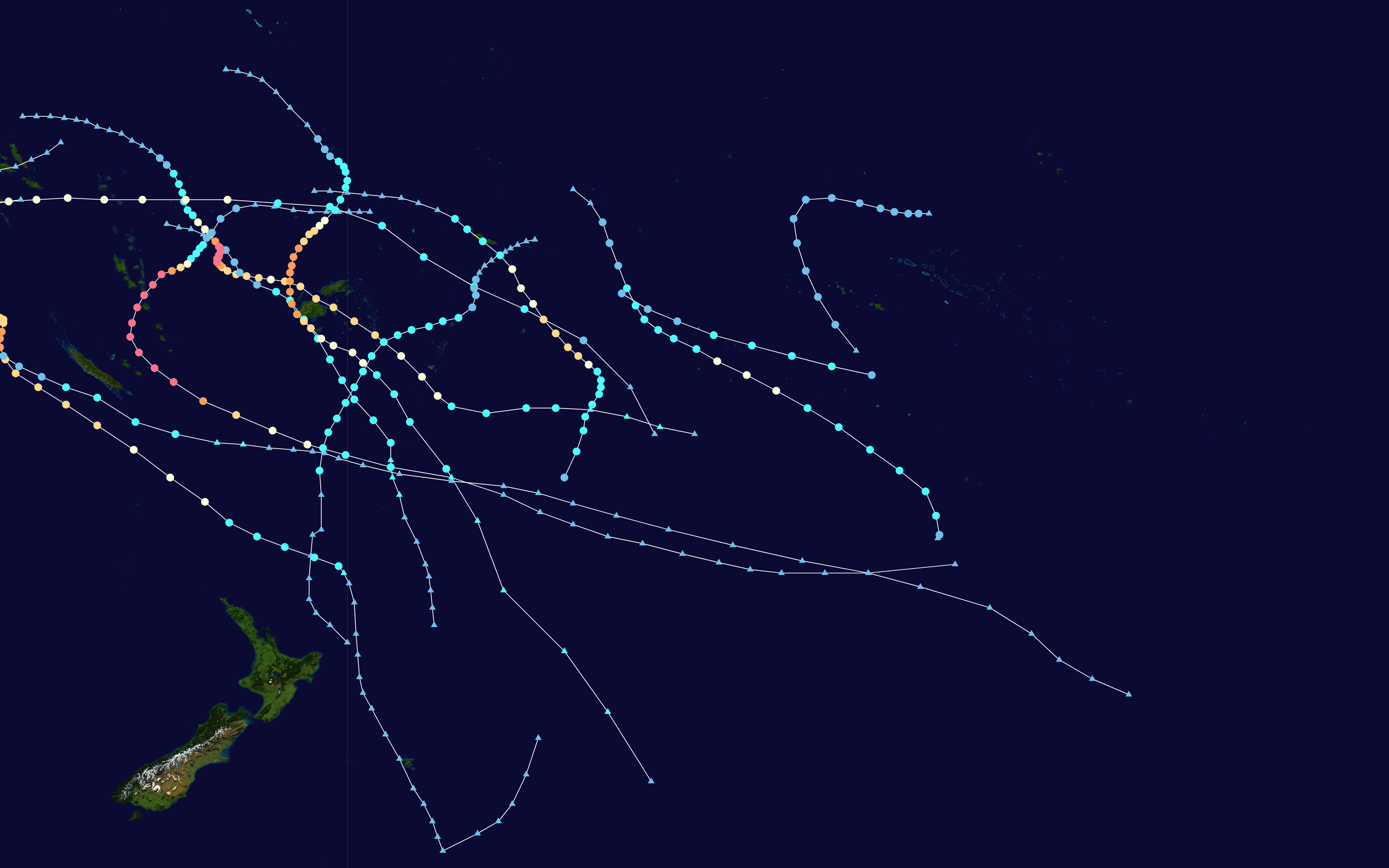
- Season summary map

Seasonal boundaries
- First system formed: December 3, 1992
- Last system dissipated: April 6, 1993

Strongest storm
- Name: Prema
  - Maximum winds: 185 km/h (115 mph) (10-minute sustained)
  - Lowest pressure: 940 hPa (mbar)

Seasonal statistics
- Total depressions: 12
- Tropical cyclones: 10
- Severe tropical cyclones: 6
- Total fatalities: None reported
- Total damage: $18.5 million (1993 USD)

Related articles
- 1992–93 South-West Indian Ocean cyclone season; 1992–93 Australian region cyclone season

The 1992–93 South Pacific cyclone season was an above-average tropical cyclone season with ten tropical cyclones occurring within the South Pacific to the east of 160°E. The season officially ran from November 1, 1992, to April 30, 1993, with the first disturbance of the season forming on December 3 and the last disturbance dissipating on April 6.

During the season, tropical cyclones were monitored by the Tropical Cyclone Warning Centers (TCWC) in Nadi, Fiji, and in Wellington, New Zealand. (Note: TCWC Nadi warned on systems in the South Pacific located from the Equator to 25°S and from 160°E to 120°W. TCWC Wellington warns on systems from 25°S to 40°S and from 160°E to 120°W) Whilst tropical cyclones that moved to the west of 160°E were monitored as a part of the Australian region by the Australian Bureau of Meteorology. Both the United States Joint Typhoon Warning Center (JTWC) and the Naval Western Oceanography Center (NWOC) issued unofficial warnings within the southern Pacific. The JTWC issued warnings between 160°E and the International Date Line whilst the NWOC issued warnings for tropical cyclones forming between the International Date Line and the coasts of the Americas. Both the JTWC and the NWOC designated tropical cyclones with a number and a P suffix with numbers assigned in order to tropical cyclones developing within the whole of the Southern Hemisphere. TCWC Nadi and TCWC Wellington both use the Australian Tropical Cyclone Intensity Scale, and measure windspeeds over a period of ten minutes, while the JTWC and the NWOC measured sustained winds over a period of one minute and use the Saffir–Simpson Hurricane Scale.

== Seasonal summary ==
On July 1, 1992, the New Zealand Meteorological Service (TCWC Wellington) was broken up and became the Meteorological Service of New Zealand and the National Institute of Water and Atmospheric Research.

Ahead of the 1992–93 season it was predicted that the season would feature a below average amount of tropical cyclones, after six tropical cyclones had affected Vanuatu during the previous season. During that season as no systems had affected the archipelago, the VMS had started to hope that no tropical cyclones would impact the archipelago during the season. However, during March 29 – 30, Cyclone Prema affected the Shepherd, E'pi and Efate where it caused widespread damage to buildings and crops.

== Systems ==
=== Severe Tropical Cyclone Joni ===
- Category 4 severe tropical cyclone (Australian scale)
- Category 3 tropical cyclone (SSHWS)
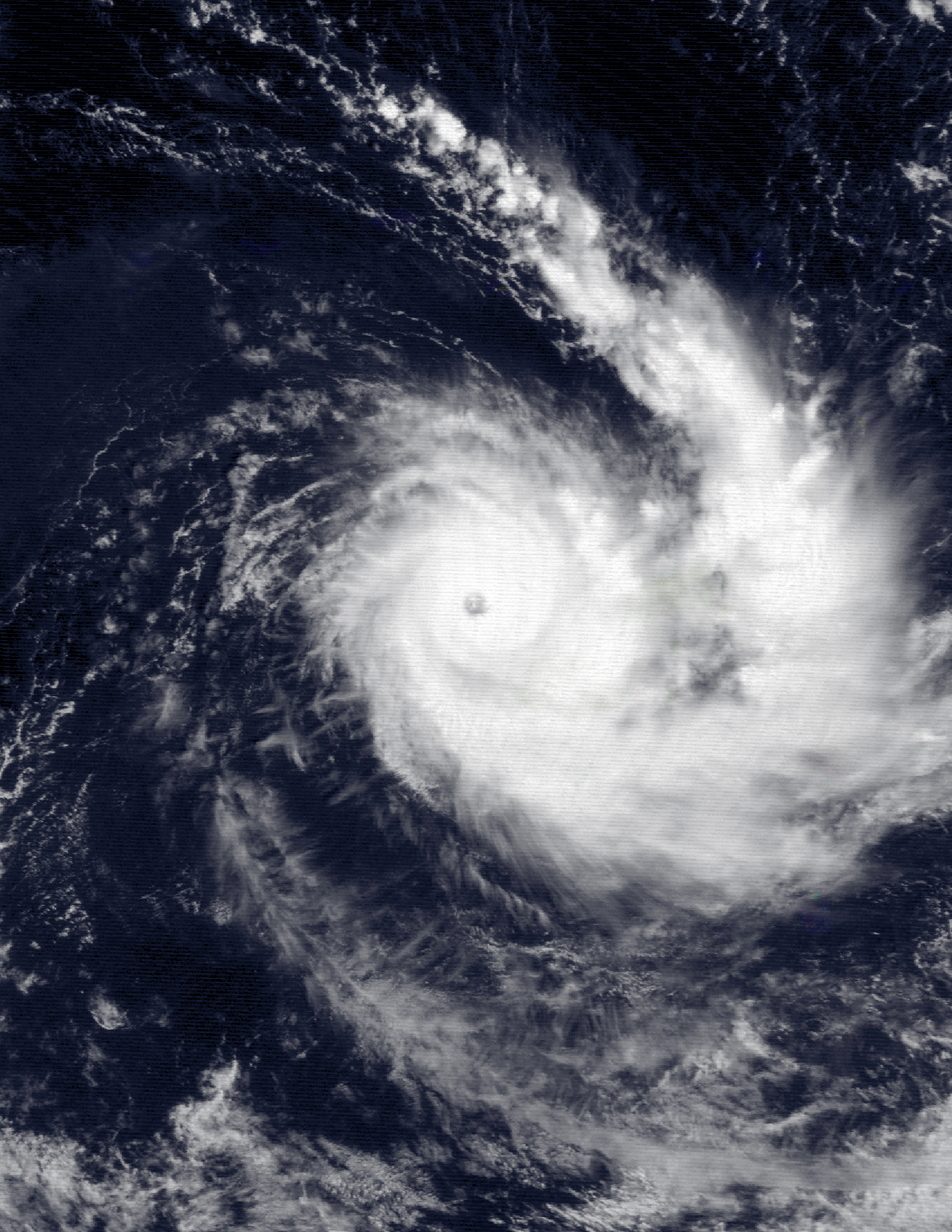
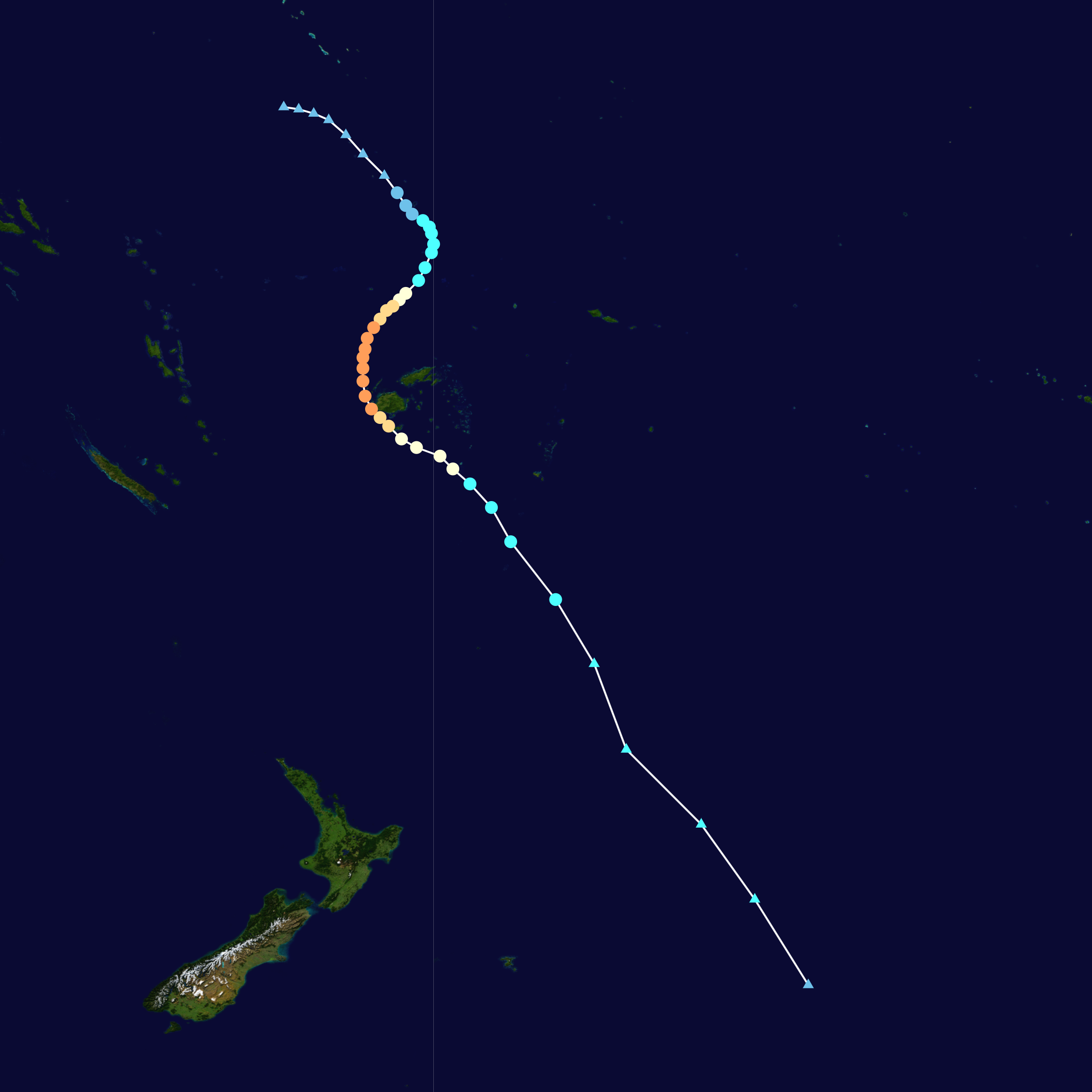
- Duration: December 3 – December 14
- Peak intensity: 165 km/h (105 mph) (10-min); 940 hPa (mbar)

At the start of December a shallow tropical depression developed, along the South Pacific Convergence Zone, in the vicinity of Tuvalu. Over the next few days the system gradually developed further as it affected Tuvalu, before it was declared to be a tropical cyclone and named Joni by the Fiji Meteorological Service (FMS) during December 7. Over the next couple of days the system intensified further as it was steered south-westwards and posed a threat to the Fijian dependency of Rotuma and the French territory of Wallis and Futuna. The system subsequently peaked as a Category 4 severe tropical cyclone on the Australian tropical cyclone intensity scale as it approached the Fijian Islands during December 10. Over the next couple of days the system moved through the Fijian Islands before it became an extratropical cyclone during December 13. The system was last noted during the next day as it was absorbed by a mid-latitude trough of low pressure to the east of New Zealand.

Joni caused gale to storm-force winds on the Tuvaluan island of Niulakita and minor damage to most of the Tuvaluan islands. Total damages to crops in the island nation were estimated at AU$6,900 (US$5,000). There were no damages reported on the islands of Wallis and Futuna or Rotuma, while 1 person was killed, 10 people went missing and total damages were estimated at FJ$2 million (US$1.6 million) in Fiji. The main impacts of Joni in Fiji were confined to the Western Division, with the islands of Yasawa, Mamanuca, Viti Levu, Kadavu and Vatulele being the worst affected areas. Damages in both Tuvalu and Fiji were exacerbated a month later by Severe Tropical Cyclones Nina and Kina interacting with each other.

=== Severe Tropical Cyclone Kina ===
- Category 3 severe tropical cyclone (Australian scale)
- Category 4 tropical cyclone (SSHWS)
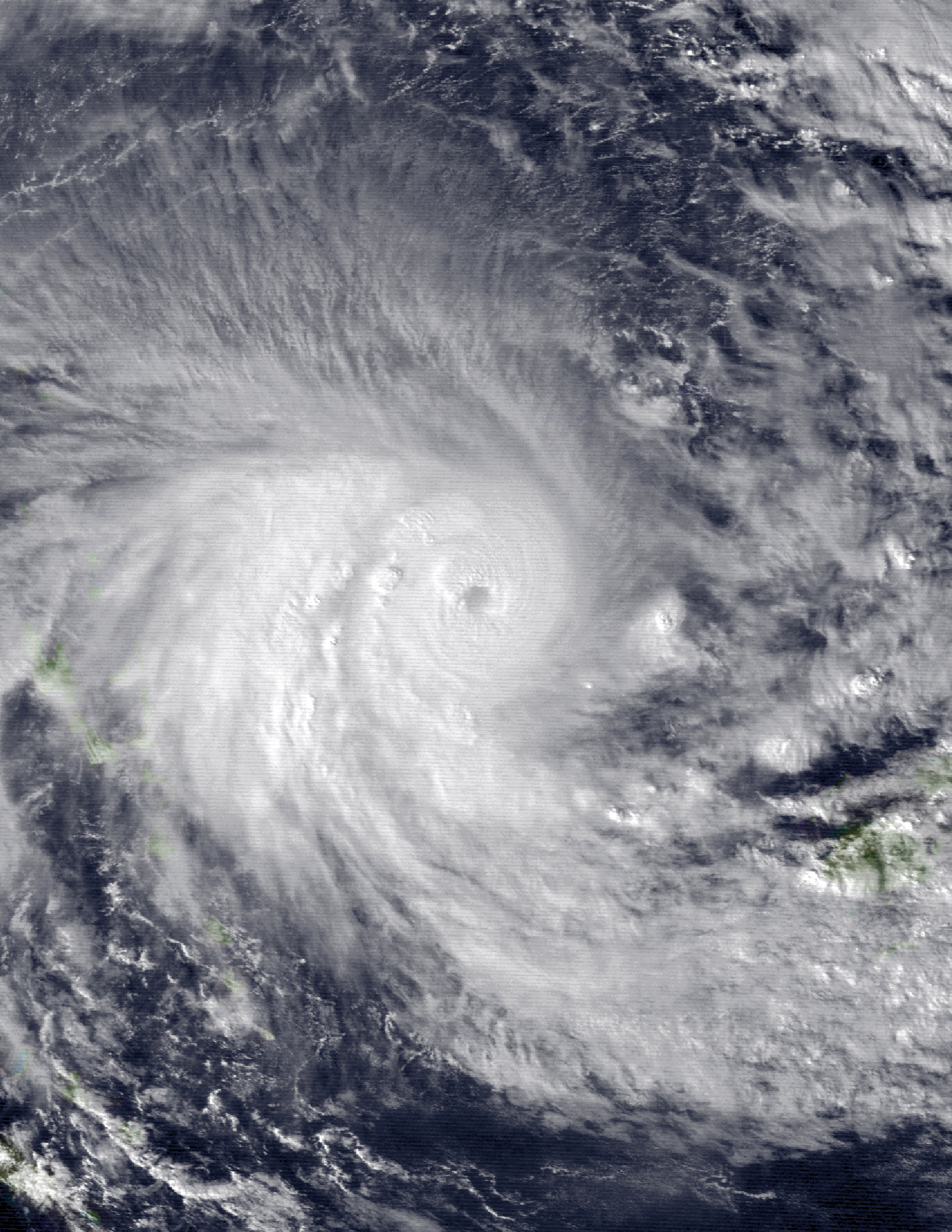
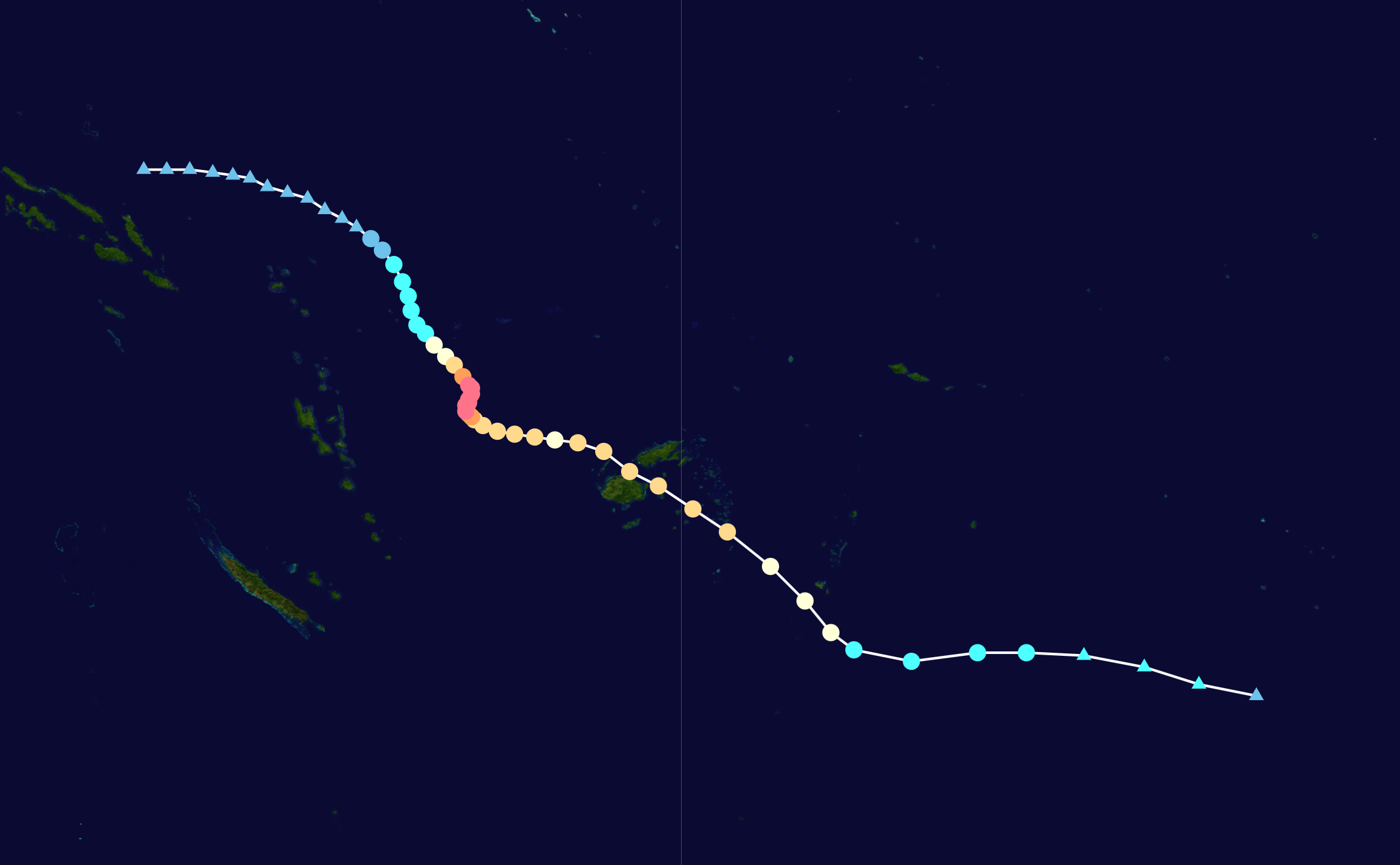
- Duration: December 23 – January 6
- Peak intensity: 150 km/h (90 mph) (10-min); 955 hPa (mbar)

On December 23, TCWC Nadi started to monitor a tropical depression, that had developed within the monsoon trough about 340 km (210 mi) to the northeast of Honiara on the Solomon Island of Guadalcanal. Over the next few days the depression gradually developed further as it moved slowly towards the south-southeast, before during December 26, the JTWC designated the system as Tropical Cyclone 07P and started to issue warnings on the system as it had become equivalent to a tropical storm. During the next day, the system appeared to slightly relax before it resumed developing from about 1200 UTC with the FMS naming it as Kina later that day, after the depression developed into a category one tropical cyclone. Early on December 28, the JTWC reported that the system had become equivalent to a category 1 hurricane on the SSHWS. During that day Kina continued to develop as it moved south-eastwards, before it turned towards the south and became slow moving later that day, before the JTWC reported during the next day that Kina had reached its peak intensity with 1-minute sustained wind speeds of 220 km/h (140 mph) which made it a category 4 hurricane on the SSHWS. Later that day TCWC Nadi reported that Kina had peaked as a category 3 severe tropical cyclone with 10 – minute sustained wind speeds of 150 km/h (90 mph).

Tracked towards the capital, Suva, where it caused significant damage and reports of casualties. The main bridge and secondary bridge to the international airport at Nadi collapsed and subsequently delayed the evacuation of tourists from the island, with emergency ferry services forced to ferry passengers from buses waiting on either side of the river bank.

Throughout Fiji, 23 people were killed and damage amounted to $100 million.

=== Severe Tropical Cyclone Nina ===
- Category 4 severe tropical cyclone (Australian scale)
- Category 1 tropical cyclone (SSHWS)
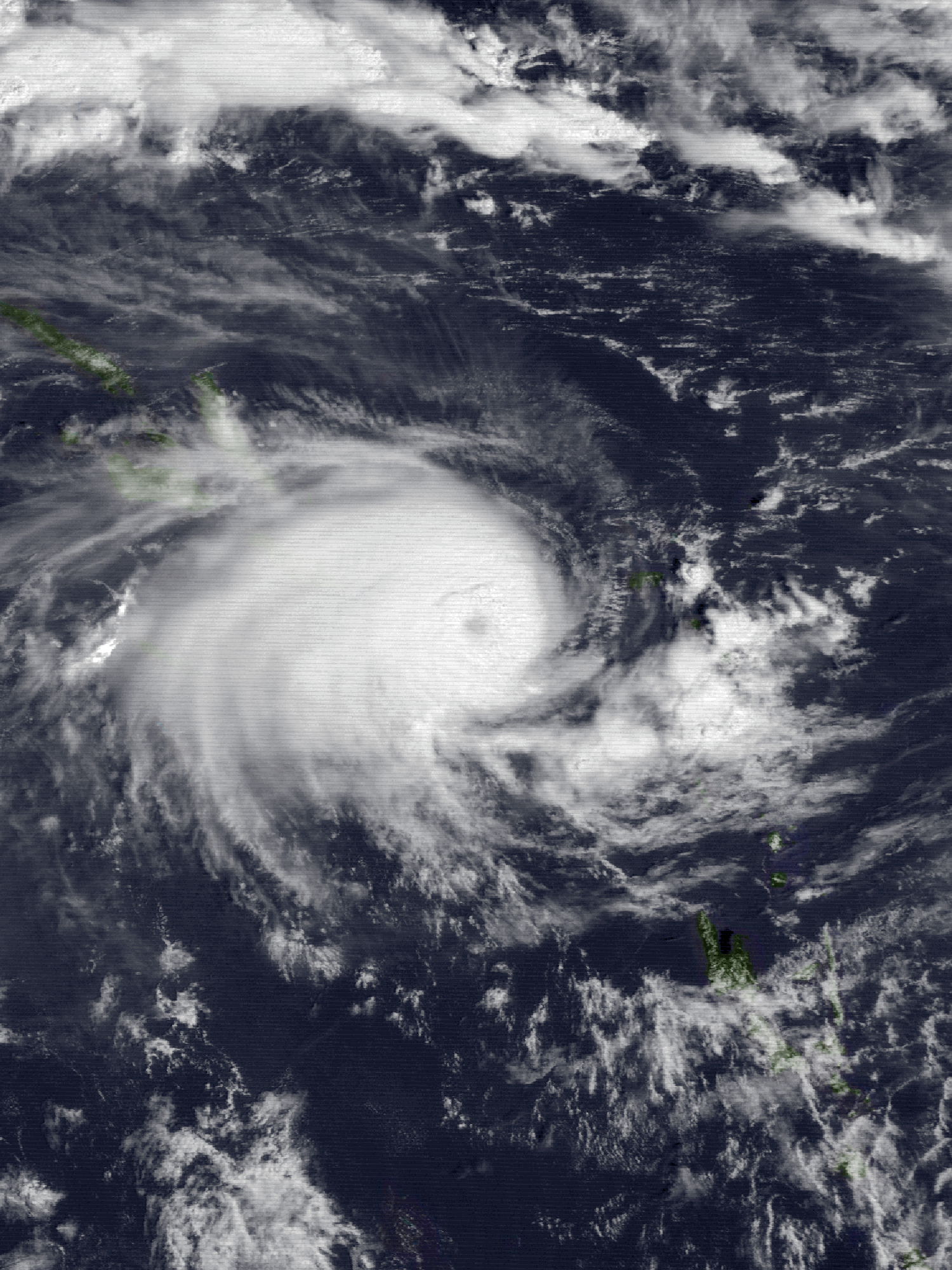
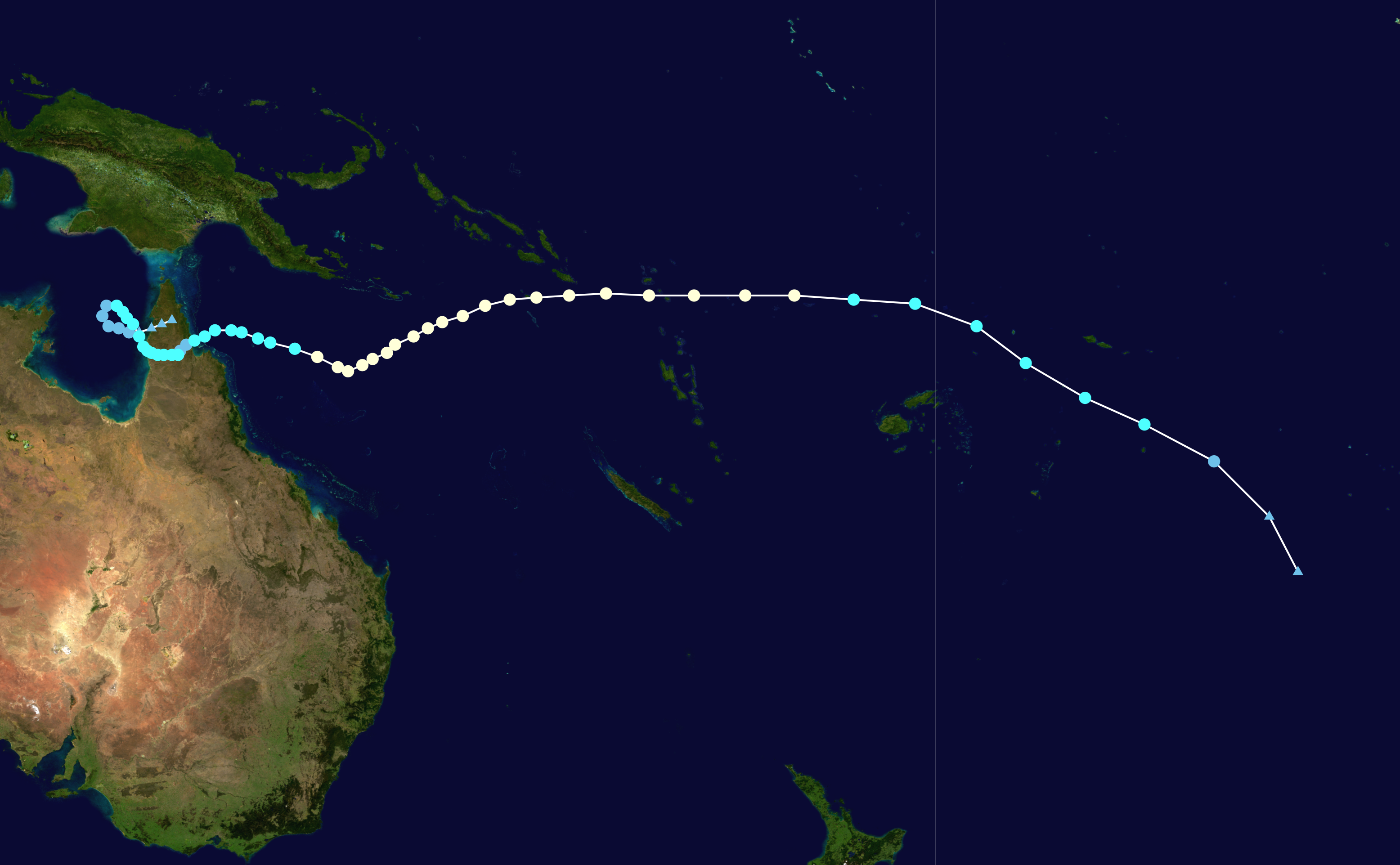
- Duration: January 1 (Entered basin) – January 5
- Peak intensity: 165 km/h (105 mph) (10-min); 960 hPa (mbar)

During January 1, Nina crossed Rennell and Bellona in the Solomon Islands and moved into the South Pacific basin.

=== Severe Tropical Cyclone Lin ===
- Category 3 severe tropical cyclone (Australian scale)
- Category 2 tropical cyclone (SSHWS)
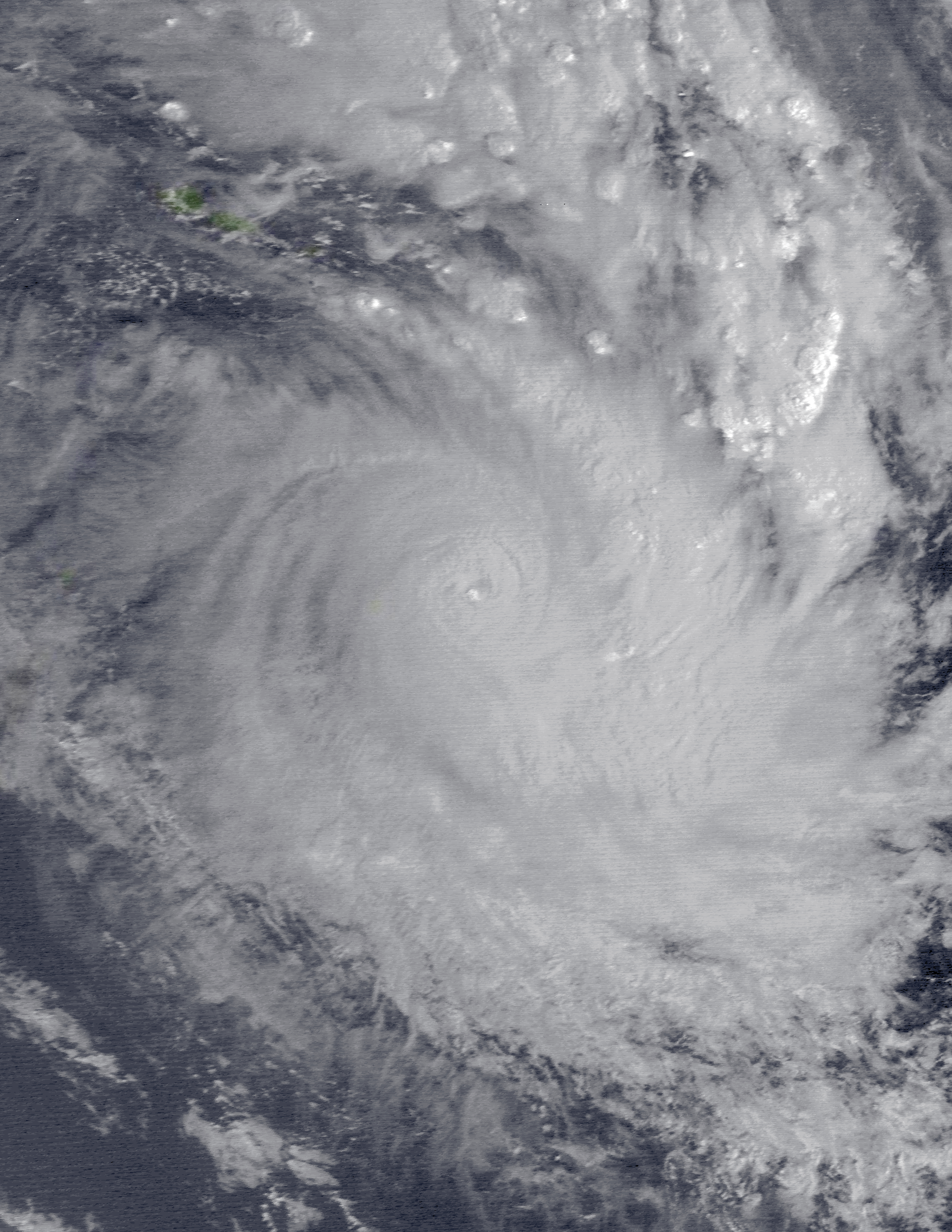
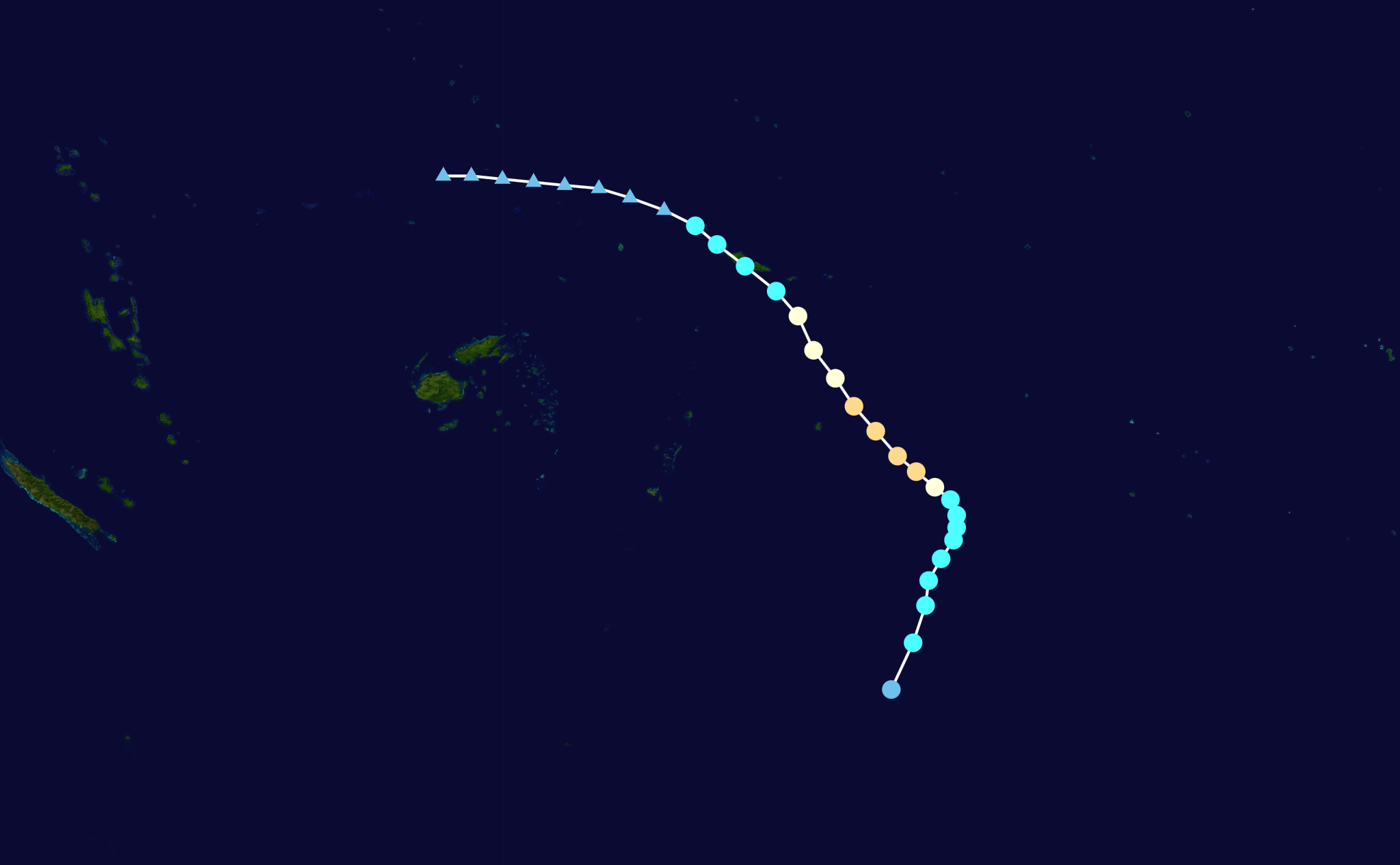
- Duration: January 30 – February 5
- Peak intensity: 120 km/h (75 mph) (10-min); 970 hPa (mbar)

A tropical depression developed on January 30, about 365 km (225 mi) to the northeast of Apia, Samoa.

=== Tropical Cyclone Mick ===
- Category 1 tropical cyclone (Australian scale)
- Tropical storm (SSHWS)
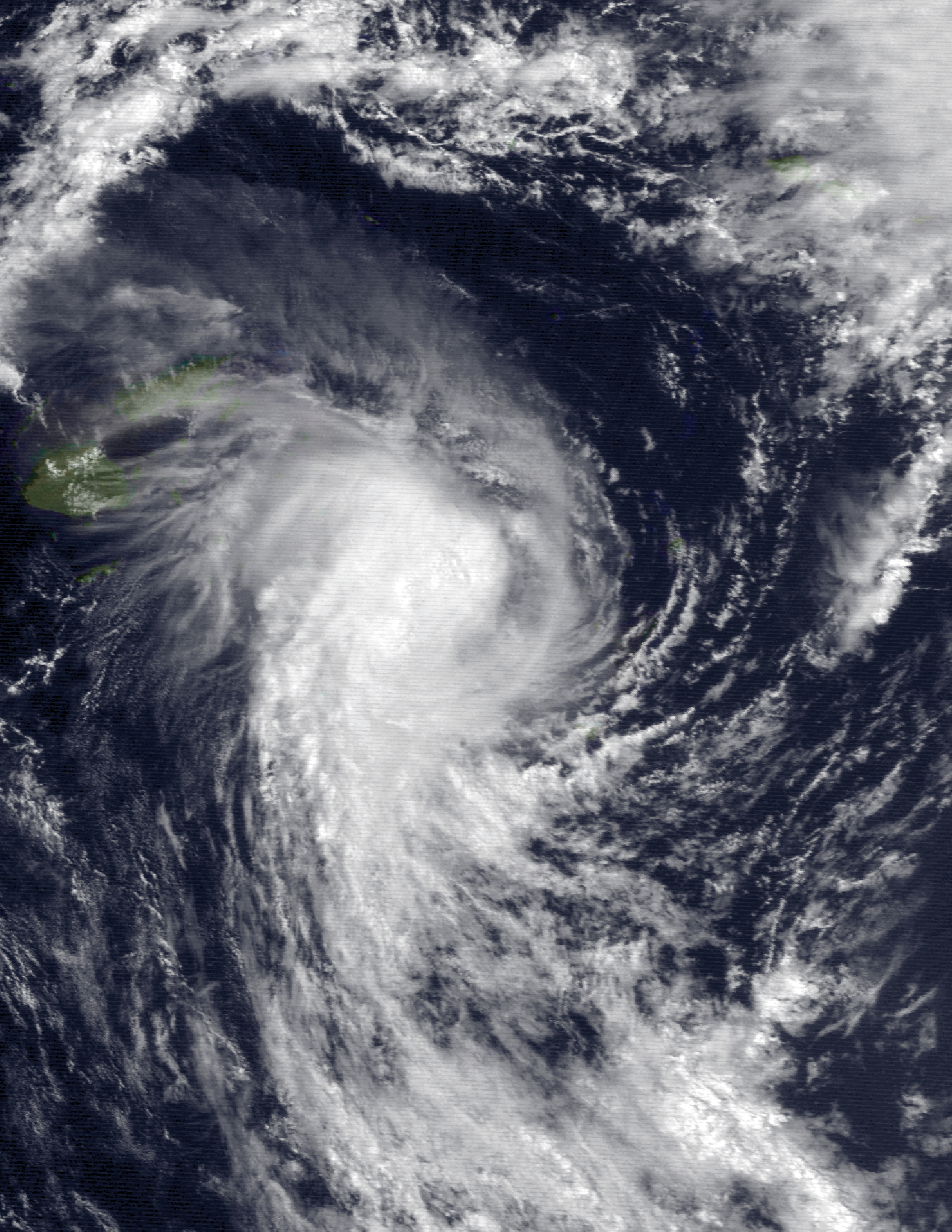
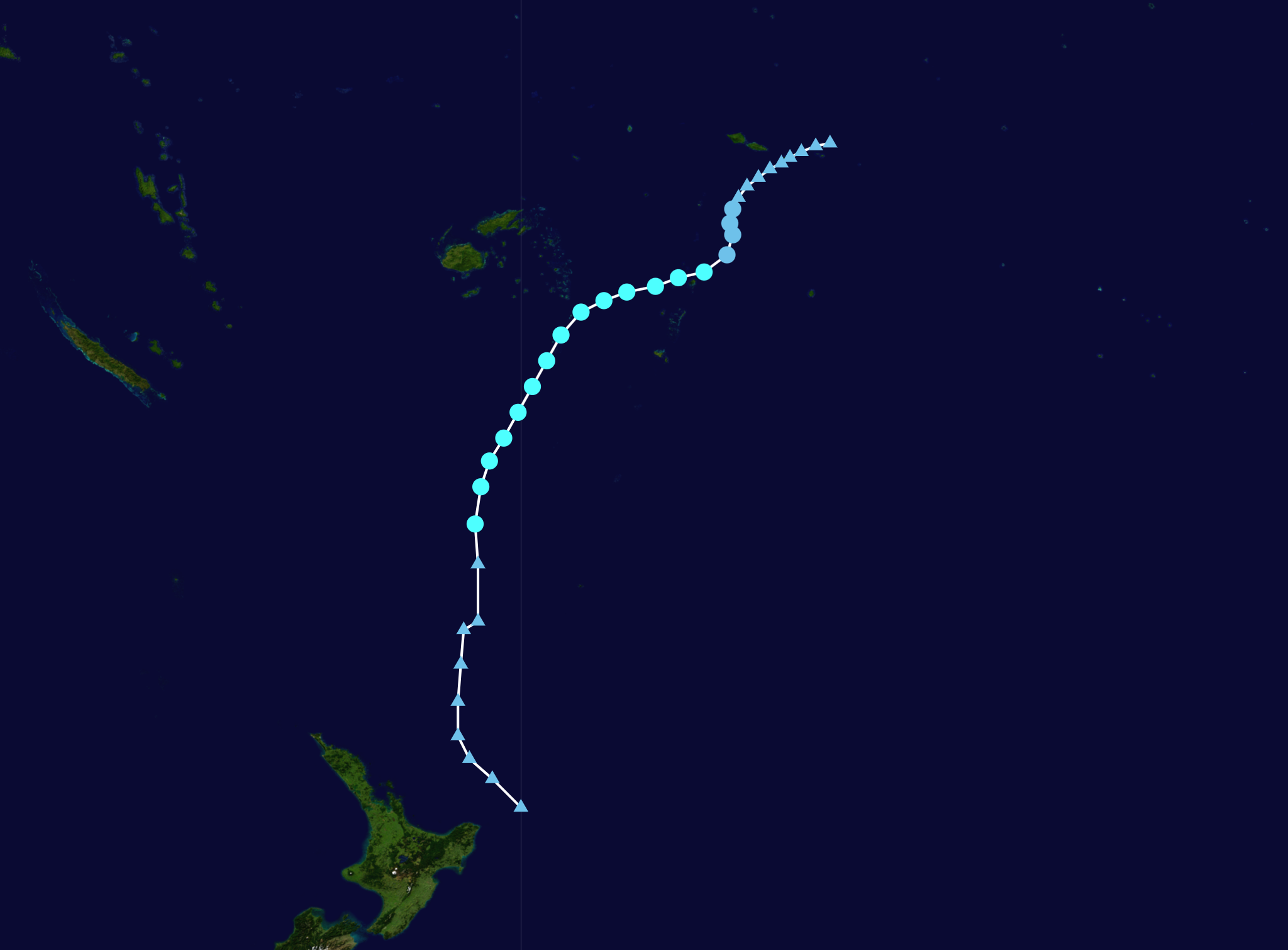
- Duration: February 3 – February 9
- Peak intensity: 85 km/h (50 mph) (10-min); 987 hPa (mbar)

A shallow tropical depression developed during February 3, within the South Pacific Convergence Zone about 170 km (105 mi) to the north-west of American Samoa. Over the next few days the system gradually developed further, as it moved south-westwards and passed near the Tongan island of Keppel during February 5. Later that day the NPMOC initiated advisories on the system and designated it as Tropical Cyclone 17P, while it was located about 520 km (325 mi) to the northeast of Nukuʻalofa. The system subsequently passed through the islands of central Tonga and was named Mick by the FMS during February 6, after it had developed into a Category 1 tropical cyclone.

After being named the system continued to intensify during that day, before both the NPMOC and the FMS reported that Mick had peaked with winds of 85 km/h (50 mph). As Mick continued to move south-westwards further development was suppressed, by cooler waters and vertical wind shear as it accelerated through Fiji's Lau Islands. The system subsequently weakened gradually, before it rapidly lost its tropical characteristics, as it moved into the subtropics during February 9. Mick's extratropical remnants were subsequently last noted during February 11, as they passed about 250 km (155 mi) to the northwest of Gisborne on New Zealand's east coast. As Mick was a small and weak system, it only caused a minimal amount of damage on the islands in Tonga and Fiji that it passed near or over.

=== Tropical Cyclone Nisha ===
- Category 2 tropical cyclone (Australian scale)
- Category 1 tropical cyclone (SSHWS)
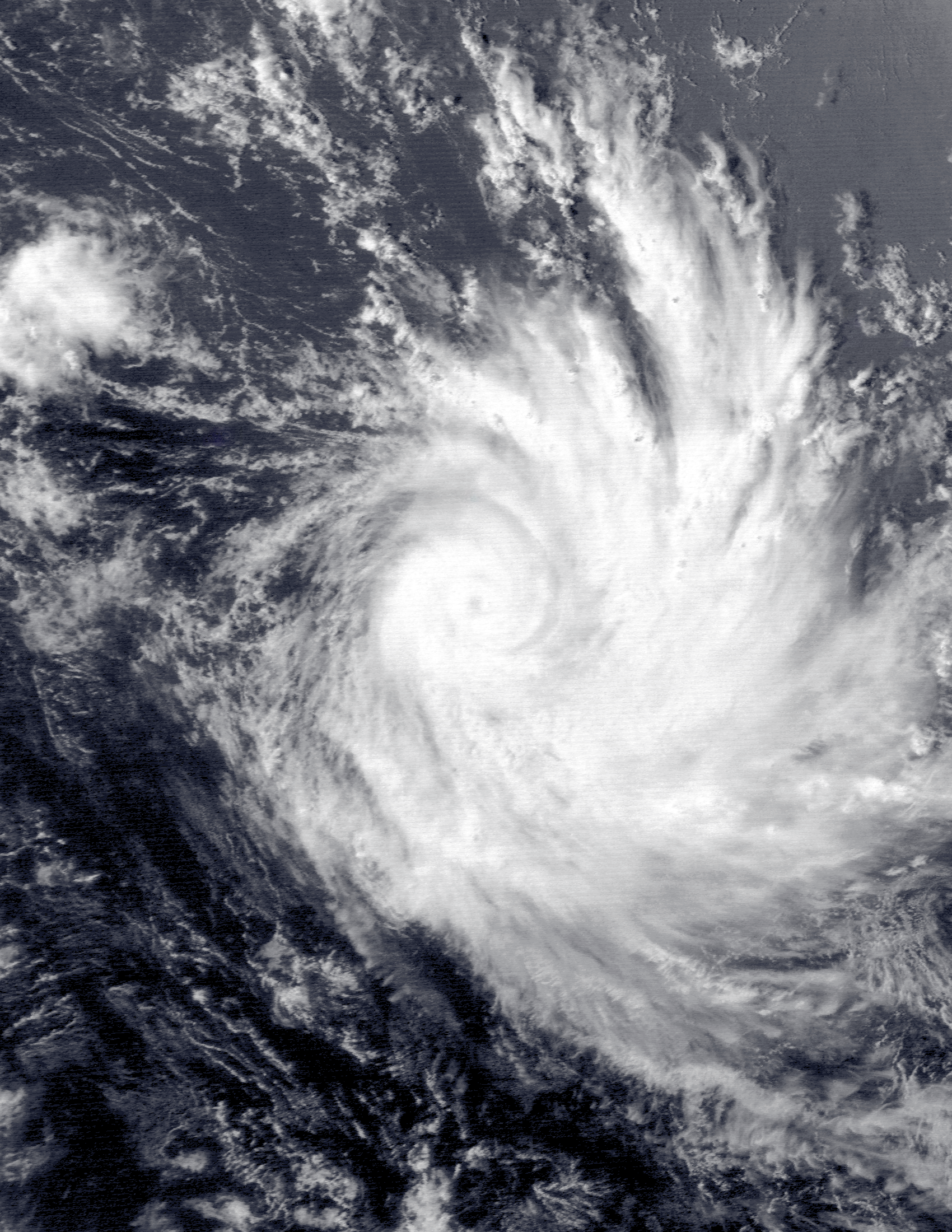
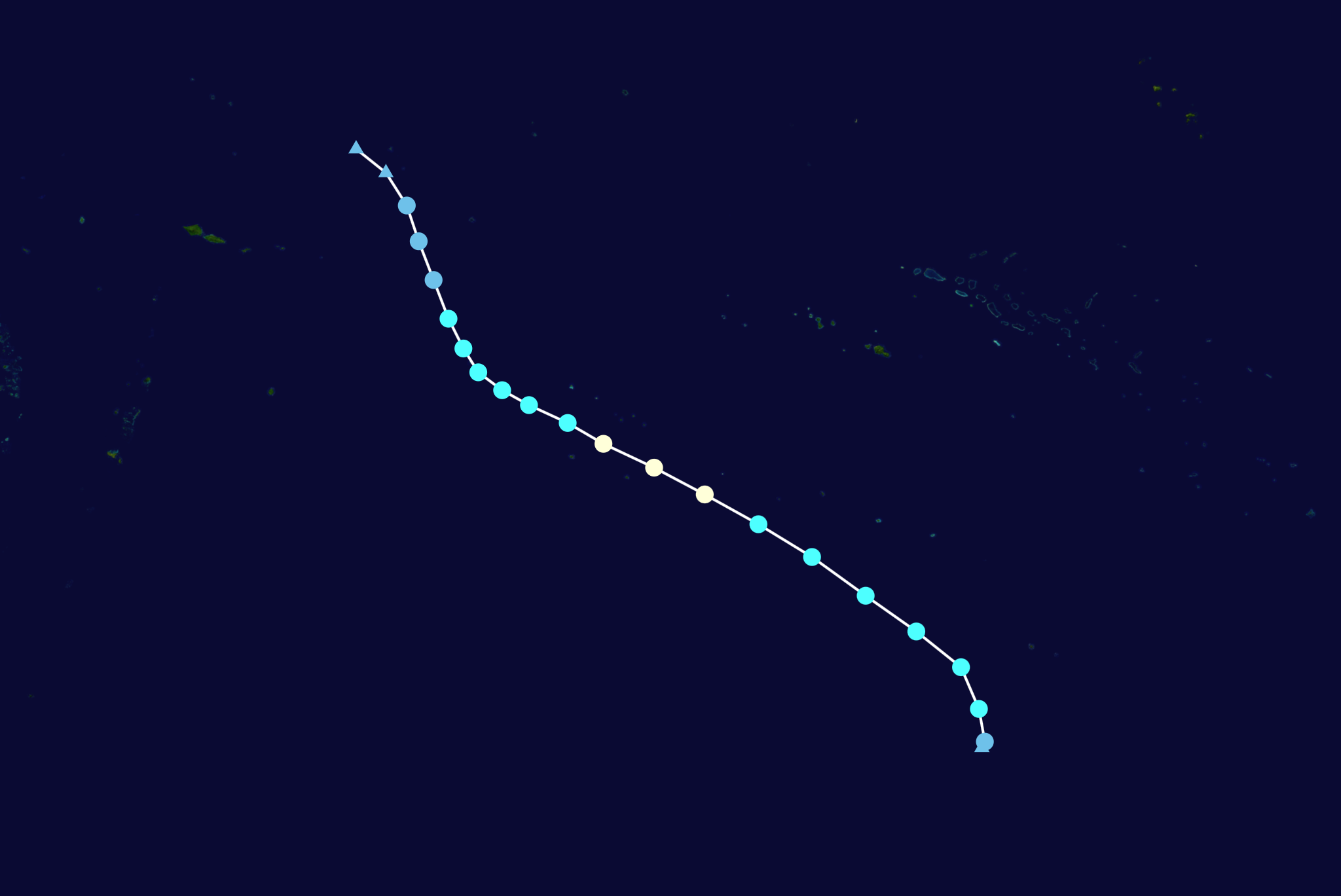
- Duration: February 9 – February 16
- Peak intensity: 110 km/h (70 mph) (10-min); 975 hPa (mbar)

During February 9, a depression developed within the South Pacific Convergence Zone, just to the southwest of Pukapuka in the Northern Cook Islands. Over the next couple of days, the system remained near stationary, before it started to move south-eastwards towards Palmerston in the Southern Cook Islands during February 12. During that day, as the system moved south-eastwards the system developed a more symmetrical circulation, before the NPMOC initiated advisories on the system and designated it as Tropical Cyclone 18P. During the next day, the FMS reported that the depression had developed into a Category 1 tropical cyclone and named it Nisha, before it passed near Palmerston, as it started to curve towards the east-southeast.

Nisha did not cause any significant impacts in either the Southern Cook Islands or French Polynesia's islands.

=== Tropical Cyclone Oli ===
- Category 1 tropical cyclone (Australian scale)
- Tropical storm (SSHWS)
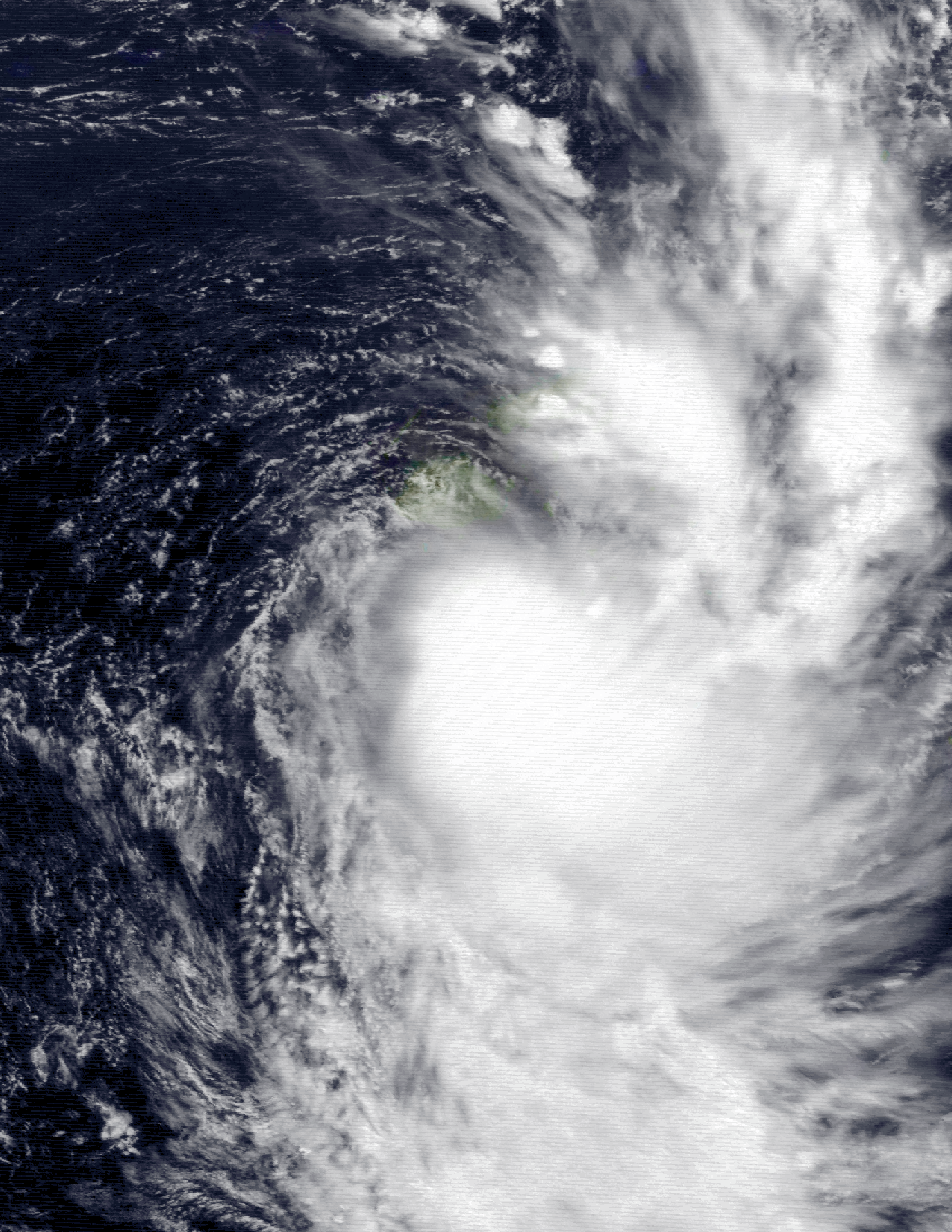
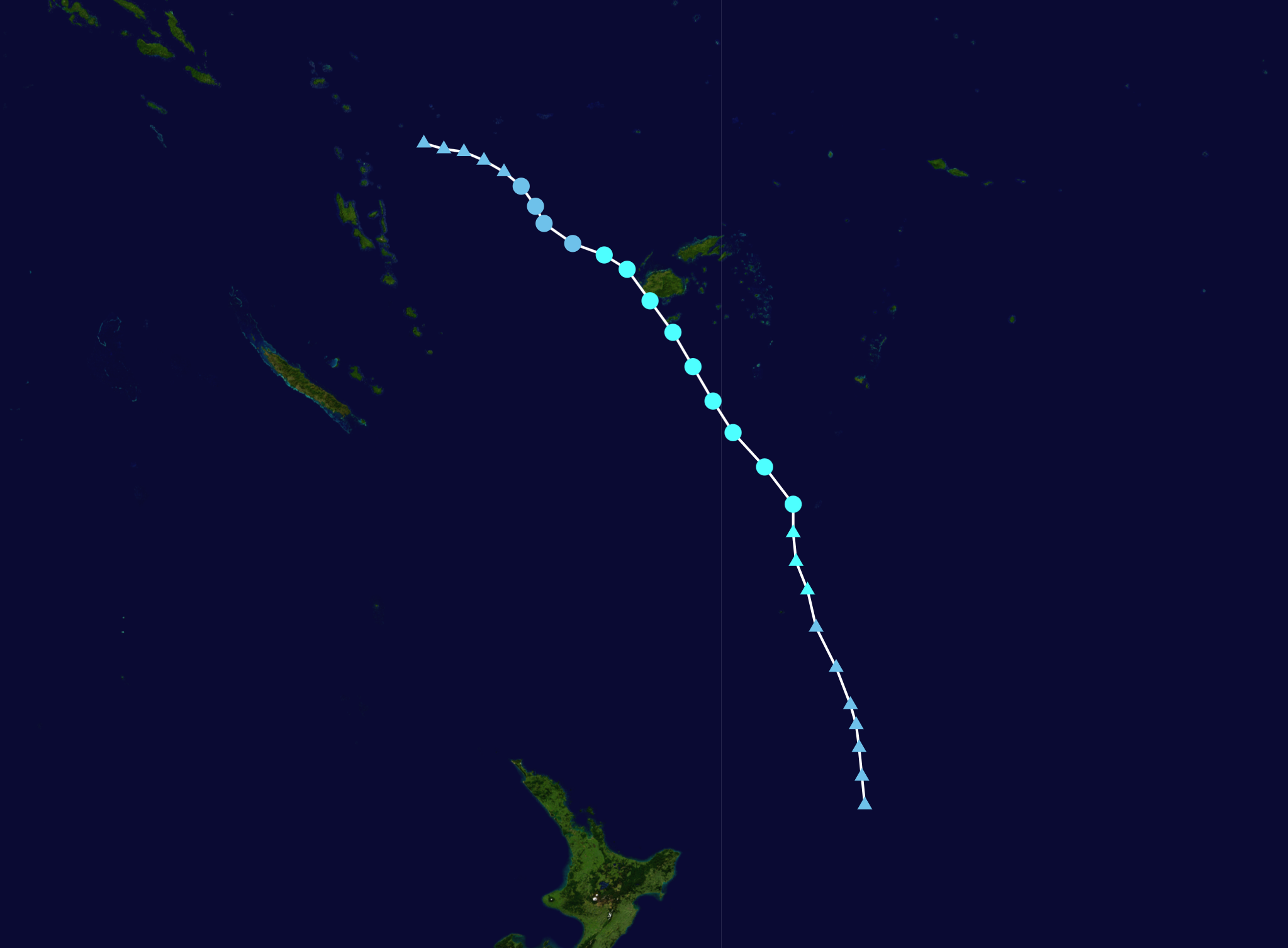
- Duration: February 14 – February 20
- Peak intensity: 75 km/h (45 mph) (10-min); 990 hPa (mbar)

Oli existed from February 14 to February 20.

=== Severe Tropical Cyclone Polly ===
- Category 3 severe tropical cyclone (Australian scale)
- Category 3 tropical cyclone (SSHWS)
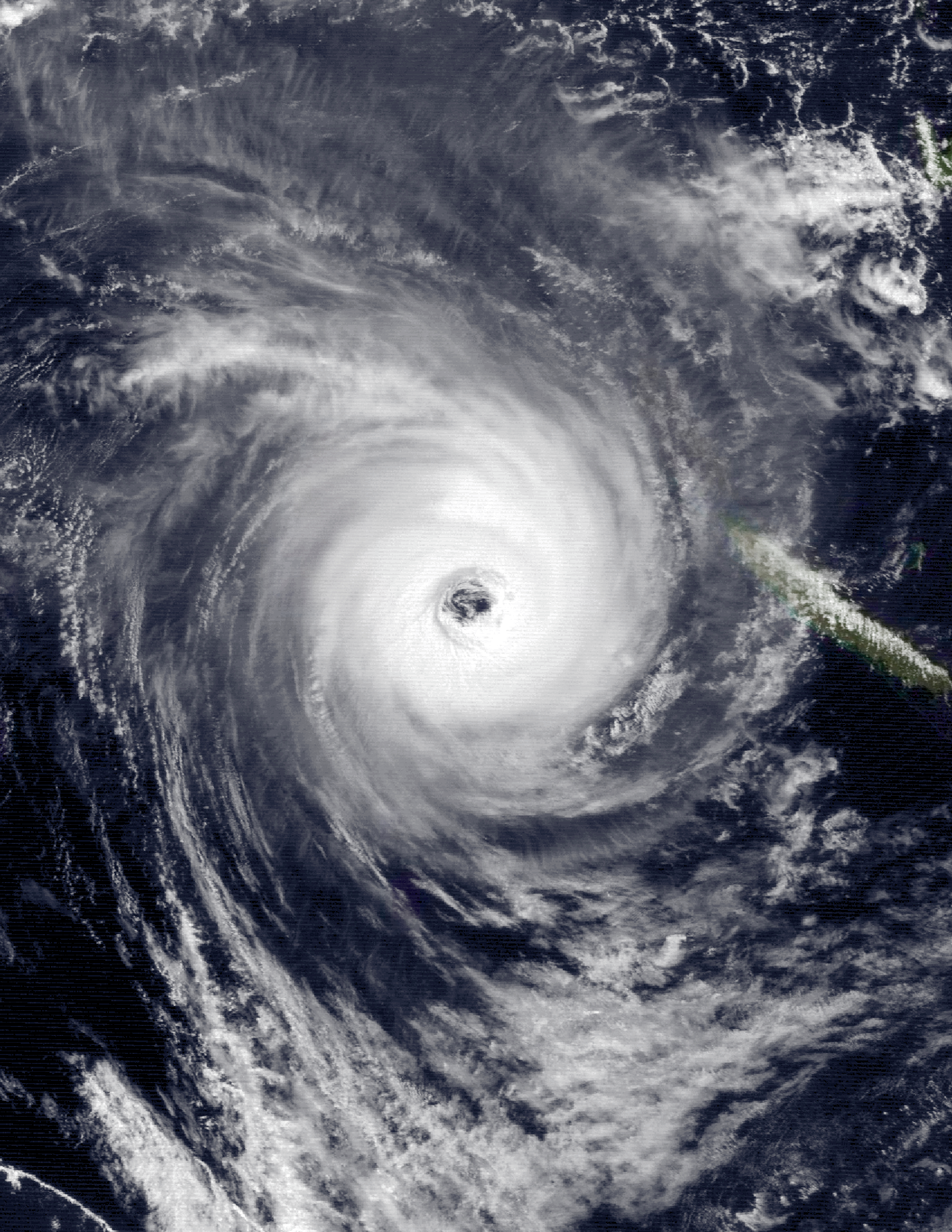
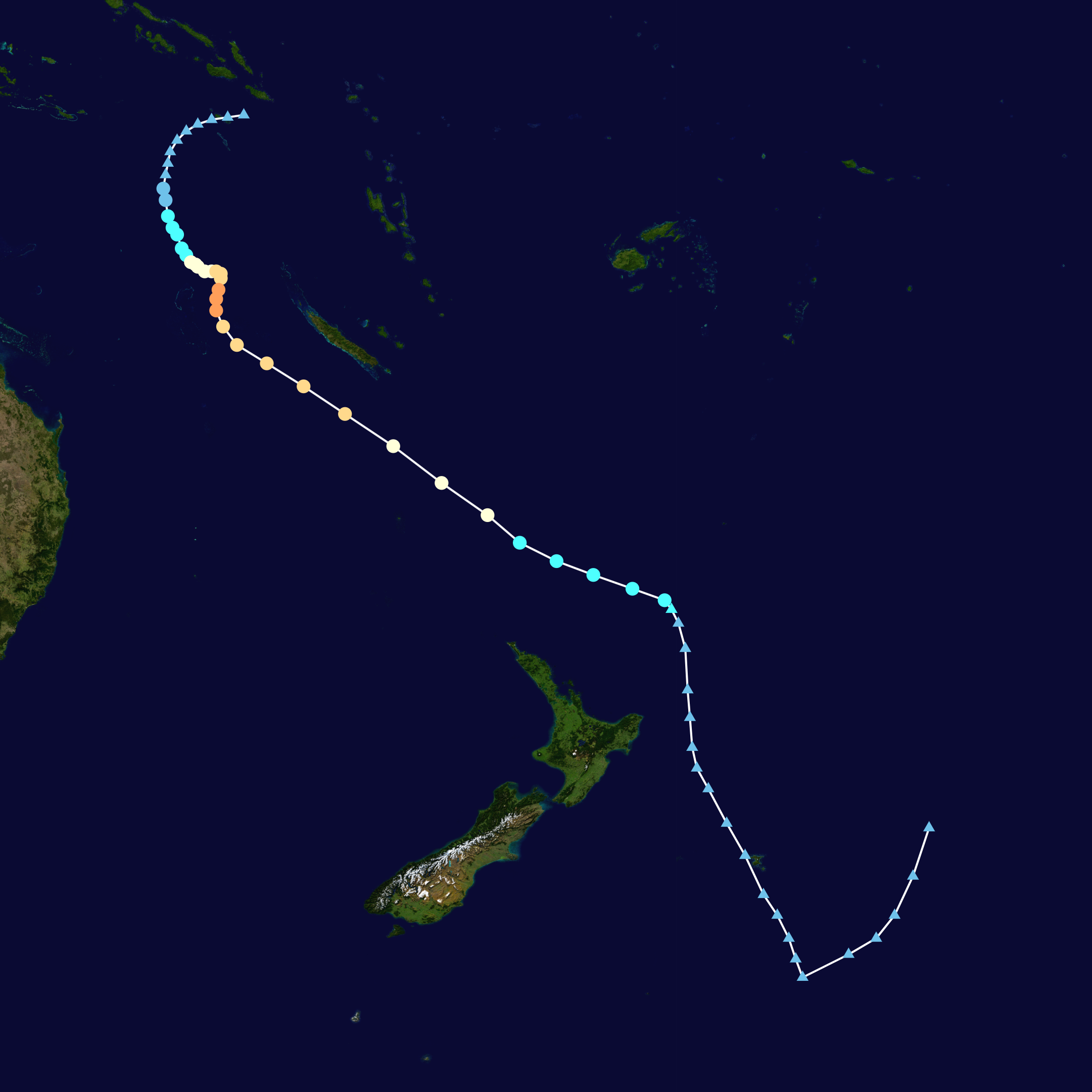
- Duration: February 27 (Entered basin) – March 9
- Peak intensity: 155 km/h (100 mph) (10-min); 945 hPa (mbar)

Developed in the Australian region of the Coral Sea far offshore from Queensland. The cyclone intensified to a Category 3 severe tropical cyclone (Australian intensity scale) before crossing into the South Pacific region where it passed to the southwest of New Caledonia.

=== Tropical Cyclone Roger ===
- Category 2 tropical cyclone (Australian scale)
- Tropical storm (SSHWS)
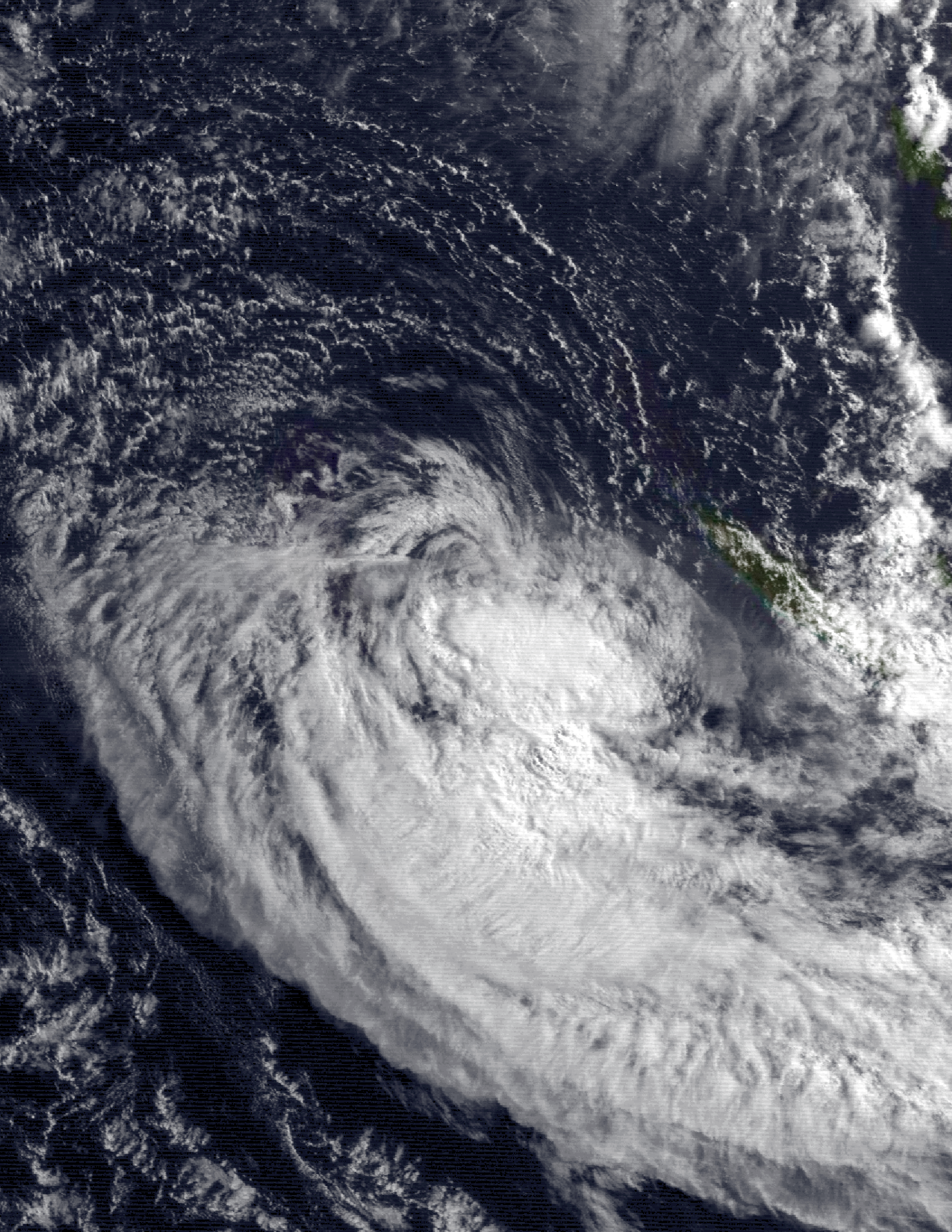
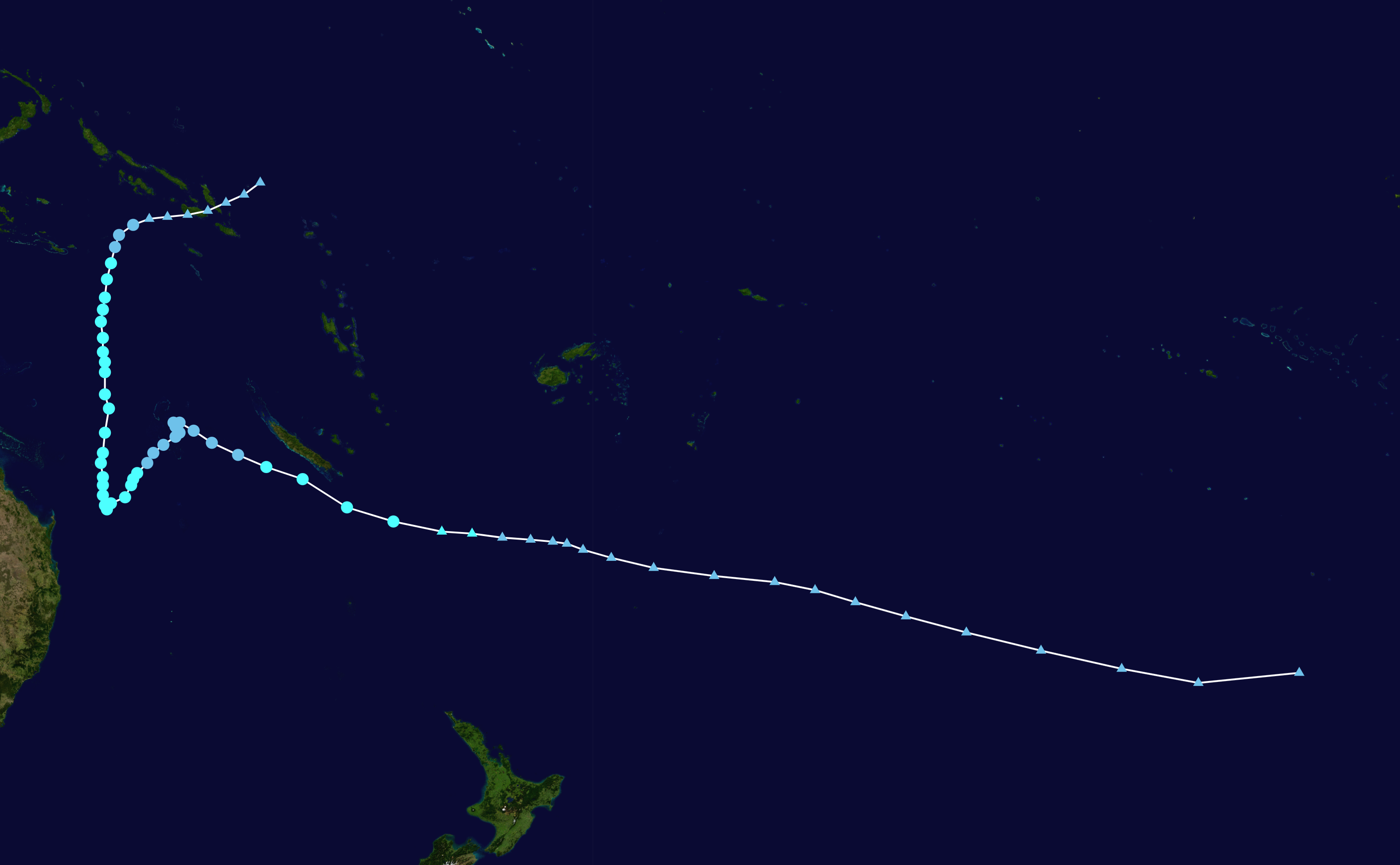
- Duration: March 20 (Entered basin) – March 22
- Peak intensity: 95 km/h (60 mph) (10-min); 985 hPa (mbar)

Roger entered the basin on March 20 and dissipated on March 22.

=== Severe Tropical Cyclone Prema ===
- Category 4 severe tropical cyclone (Australian scale)
- Category 4 tropical cyclone (SSHWS)
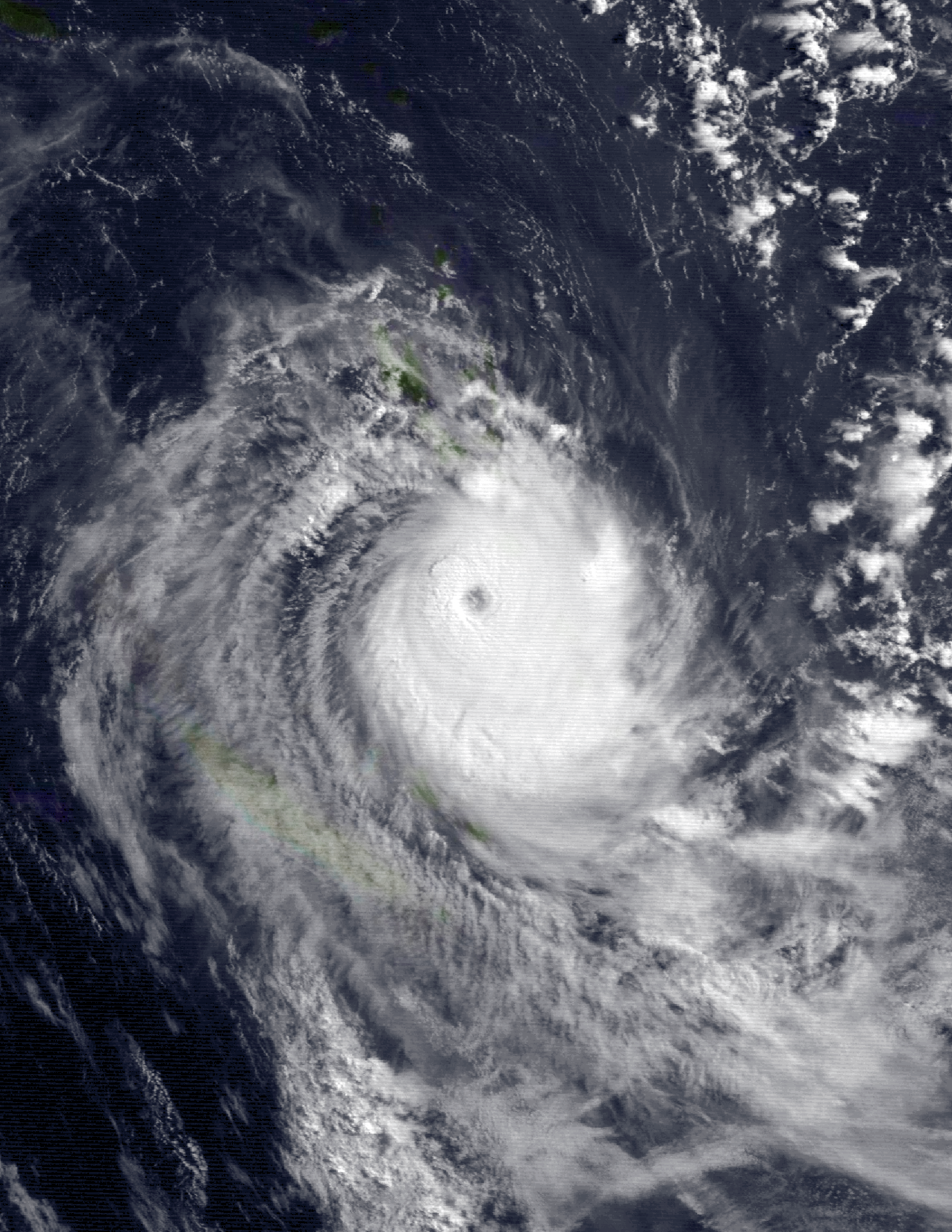
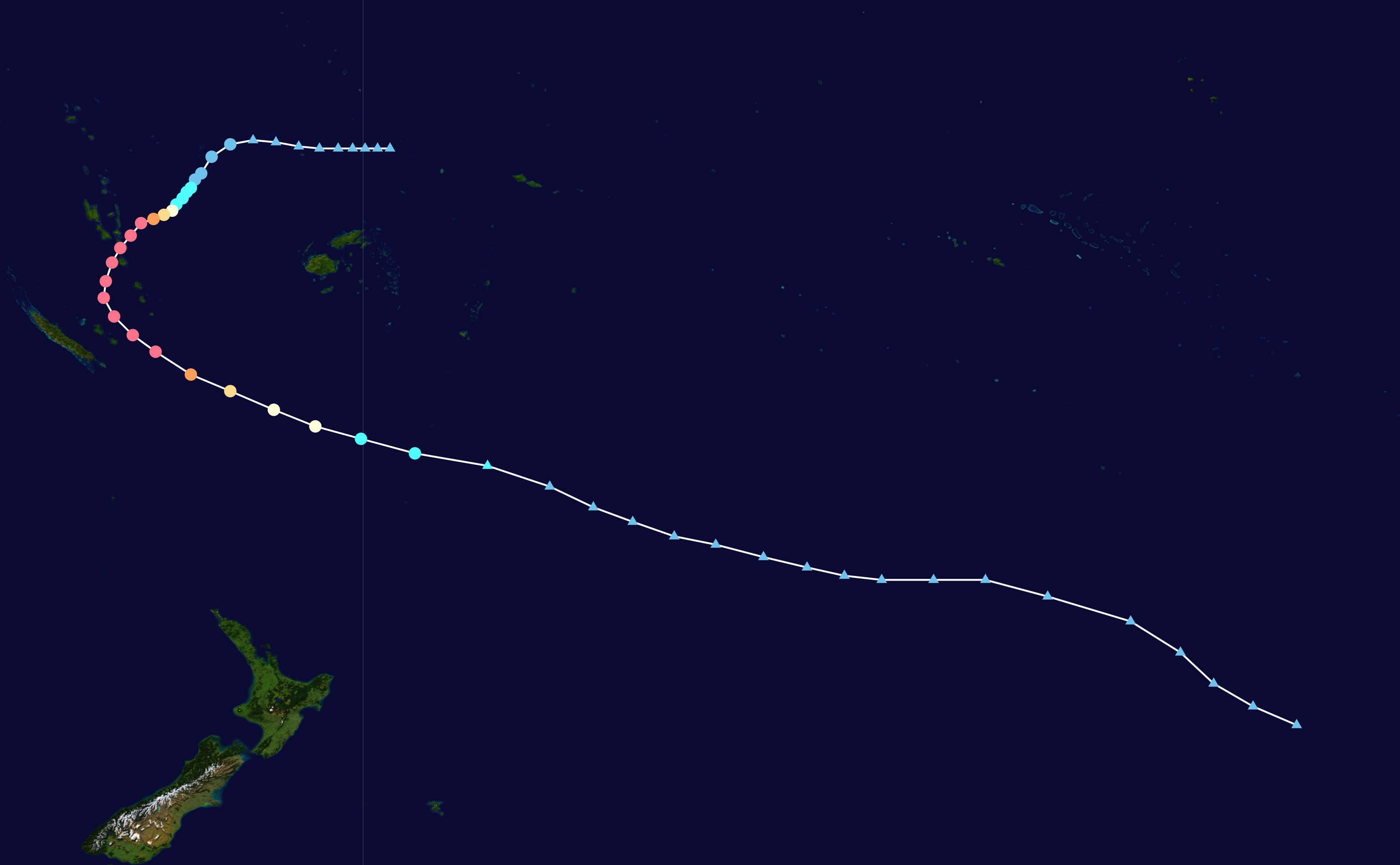
- Duration: March 24 – April 6
- Peak intensity: 185 km/h (115 mph) (10-min); 940 hPa (mbar)

Prema existed from March 24 to April 6.

=== Other systems ===
Tropical Cyclone 08P was first noted as a tropical depression by the FMS during January 1, while it was located about 500 km (310 mi) to the east of Alofi in Niue. During that day the depression moved eastwards, before the NPMOC initiated advisories on the system and designated it as Tropical Cyclone 08P. During that day 08P started to move towards the southeast through the Cook Islands, before it peaked with estimated 1-minute sustained wind speeds of 85 km/h (50 mph). During January 3, 08P rapidly degenerated into an extratropical low, while it was located about 405 km to the southeast of Papeete in French Polynesia. There were no reports of any impacts within the Cook Islands associated with 08P. Tropical Cyclone 09P developed on January 11, while it was located about 610 km (380 mi) to the north of the island of Tahiti in French Polynesia. Over the next couple of days the system moved westwards and gradually turned and started to move south-eastwards before it was last noted during January 14.

== Season effects ==
This table lists all the storms that developed in the South Pacific to the east of longitude 160°E during the 1992–93 season. It includes their intensity on the Australian Tropical cyclone intensity scale, duration, name, landfalls, deaths, and damages. All data is taken from the warning centers from the region unless otherwise noted.

1992–93 South Pacific cyclone season
Name	Dates active	Peak intensity			Areas affected	Damage (US$)	Deaths	Refs
Name	Dates active	Category	Wind speed	Pressure	Areas affected	Damage (US$)	Deaths	Refs
Joni	December 3 – 13	Category 4 severe tropical cyclone	165 km/h (105 mph)	940 hPa (27.76 inHg)	Tuvalu, Fiji	$1 million	1	
Kina	December 26, 1992 – January 5, 1993	Category 3 severe tropical cyclone	150 km/h (90 mph)	955 hPa (28.20 inHg)	Fiji, Tonga	$110 million	26	
Nina	January 1 – 5	Category 4 severe tropical cyclone	165 km/h (105 mph)	960 hPa (28.35 inHg)	Queensland, Solomon Islands, Wallis and Futuna, Rotuma, Tonga	$50,000	3	
08P	January 1 – 3	Tropical depression	Not Specified	Not Specified	Southern Cook Islands	Unknown	Unknown	
09P	January 11 – 13	Tropical depression	Not Specified	Not Specified	French Polynesia	Unknown	Unknown	
Lin	January 30 – February 5	Category 3 severe tropical cyclone	120 km/h (75 mph)	970 hPa (28.64 inHg)	Samoa	Unknown	Unknown	
Mick	February 3 – 9	Category 1 tropical cyclone	85 km/h (50 mph)	987 hPa (29.15 inHg)	Tonga, Fiji, New Zealand	Minimal	None	
Nisha	February 9 – 16	Category 2 tropical cyclone	110 km/h (70 mph)	975 hPa (28.79 inHg)	Cook Islands, French Polynesia	Unknown	Unknown	
Oli	February 14 – 20	Category 1 tropical cyclone	75 km/h (45 mph)	990 hPa (29.23 inHg)	Fiji	Unknown	Unknown	
Polly	February 27 – March 9	Category 3 severe tropical cyclone	155 km/h (100 mph)	945 hPa (27.91 inHg)	Solomon Islands, New Caledonia, New Zealand	Unknown	Unknown	
Roger	March 20 – 27	Category 2 tropical cyclone	95 km/h (60 mph)	985 hPa (29.09 inHg)	Solomon Islands, Australia, New Caledonia	Unknown	Unknown	
Prema	March 24 – April 6	Category 4 severe tropical cyclone	185 km/h (115 mph)	940 hPa (27.76 inHg)	Vanuatu, New Caledonia	Unknown	Unknown	
Season aggregates
12 systems	December 3, 1992 – April 6, 1993		185 km/h (115 mph)	940 hPa (27.76 inHg)		$111 million	30	

== See also ==
- Atlantic hurricane seasons: 1992, 1993
- Pacific hurricane seasons: 1992, 1993
- Pacific typhoon seasons: 1992, 1993
- North Indian Ocean cyclone seasons: 1992, 1993
