= Cyclone Joni =

Category 3 South Pacific cyclone in 1992

Severe Tropical Cyclone Joni
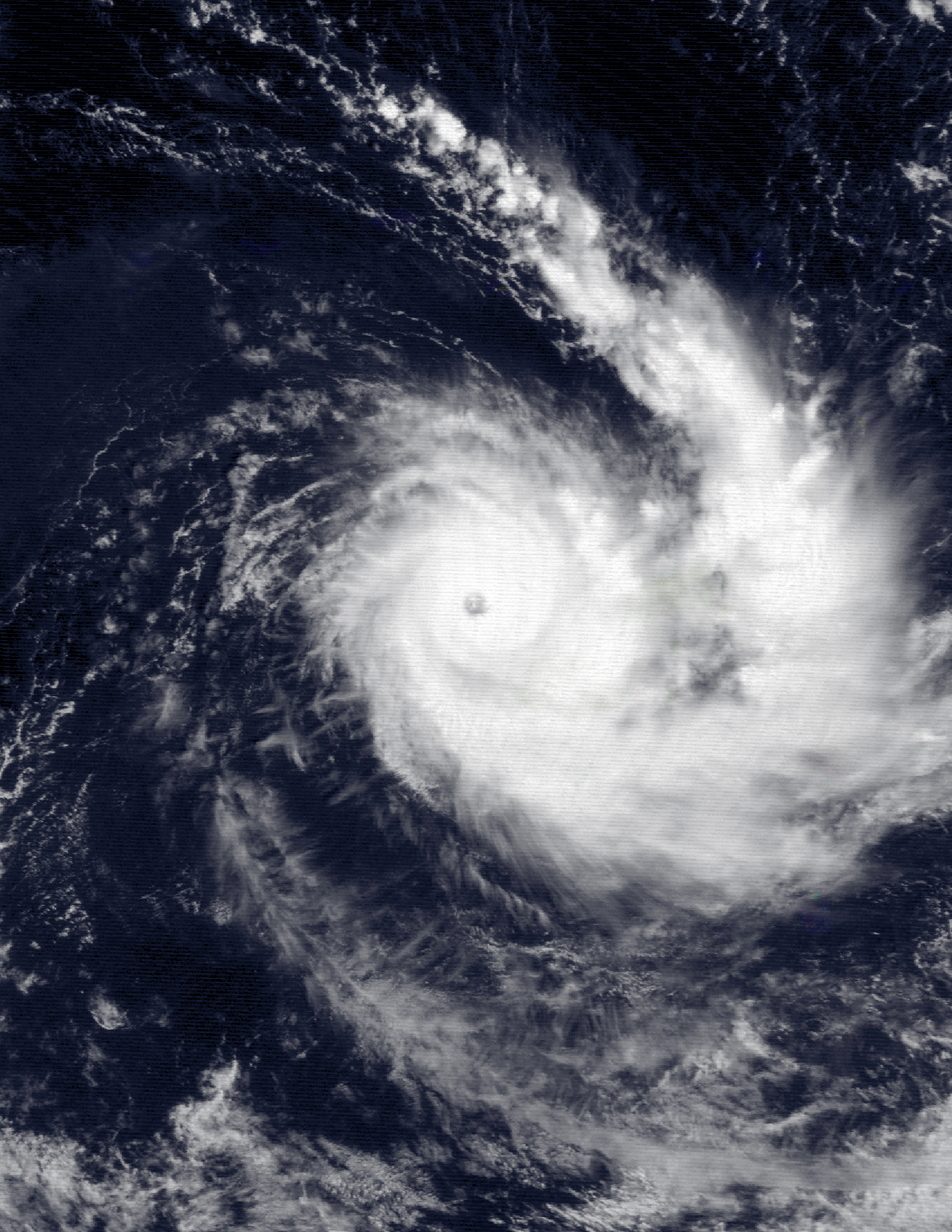
- Satellite image of Cyclone Joni near its peak intensity

Meteorological history
- Formed: December 3, 1992
- Extratropical: December 13, 1992
- Dissipated: December 14, 1992

Category 4 severe tropical cyclone
- 10-minute sustained (FMS)
- Highest winds: 165 km/h (105 mph)
- Lowest pressure: 940 hPa (mbar); 27.76 inHg

Category 3-equivalent tropical cyclone
- 1-minute sustained (SSHWS/JTWC)
- Highest winds: 205 km/h (125 mph)
- Lowest pressure: 933 hPa (mbar); 27.55 inHg

Overall effects
- Fatalities: 1
- Damage: $1.6 million (1992 USD)
- Areas affected: Tuvalu, Fiji
- IBTrACS
- Part of the 1992–93 South Pacific cyclone season

Severe Tropical Cyclone Joni was a damaging tropical cyclone that impacted the island nations of Tuvalu and Fiji. It was first noted within the South Pacific Convergence Zone at the start of December 1992, as a shallow tropical depression in the vicinity of the island nation Tuvalu. Over the next few days the system gradually developed further as it affected Tuvalu, before it was declared to be a tropical cyclone and named Joni by the Fiji Meteorological Service (FMS) during December 7. Over the next couple of days the system intensified further as it was steered south-westwards and posed a threat towards the Fijian dependency of Rotuma and the French territory of Wallis and Futuna. The system subsequently peaked as a Category 4 severe tropical cyclone on the Australian tropical cyclone intensity scale as it approached the Fijian Islands during December 10. Over the next couple of days the system moved through the Fijian Islands, before it became an extratropical cyclone during December 13. The system was last noted during the next day as it was absorbed by a mid-latitude trough of low pressure to the east of New Zealand.

Joni caused gale to storm force winds on the Tuvuluan island of Niulakita and minor damage to most of the Tuvuluan islands. Total damages to crops in the island nation were estimated at AU$6,900 (US$5,000). There were no damages reported on the islands of Wallis and Futuna or Rotuma, while 1 person was killed, 10 people went missing and total damages were estimated at FJ$2 million (US$1.6 million) in Fiji. The main impacts of Joni in Fiji were confined to the Western Division, with the islands of Yasawa, Mamanuca, Viti Levu, Kadavu and Vatulele being the worst affected areas. Damages in both Tuvalu and Fiji were exacerbated a month later by Severe Tropical Cyclones Nina and Kina interacting with each other. Due to the impact of this system, the name Joni was subsequently retired from the list of names for the region by the World Meteorological Organization.

== Meteorological history ==
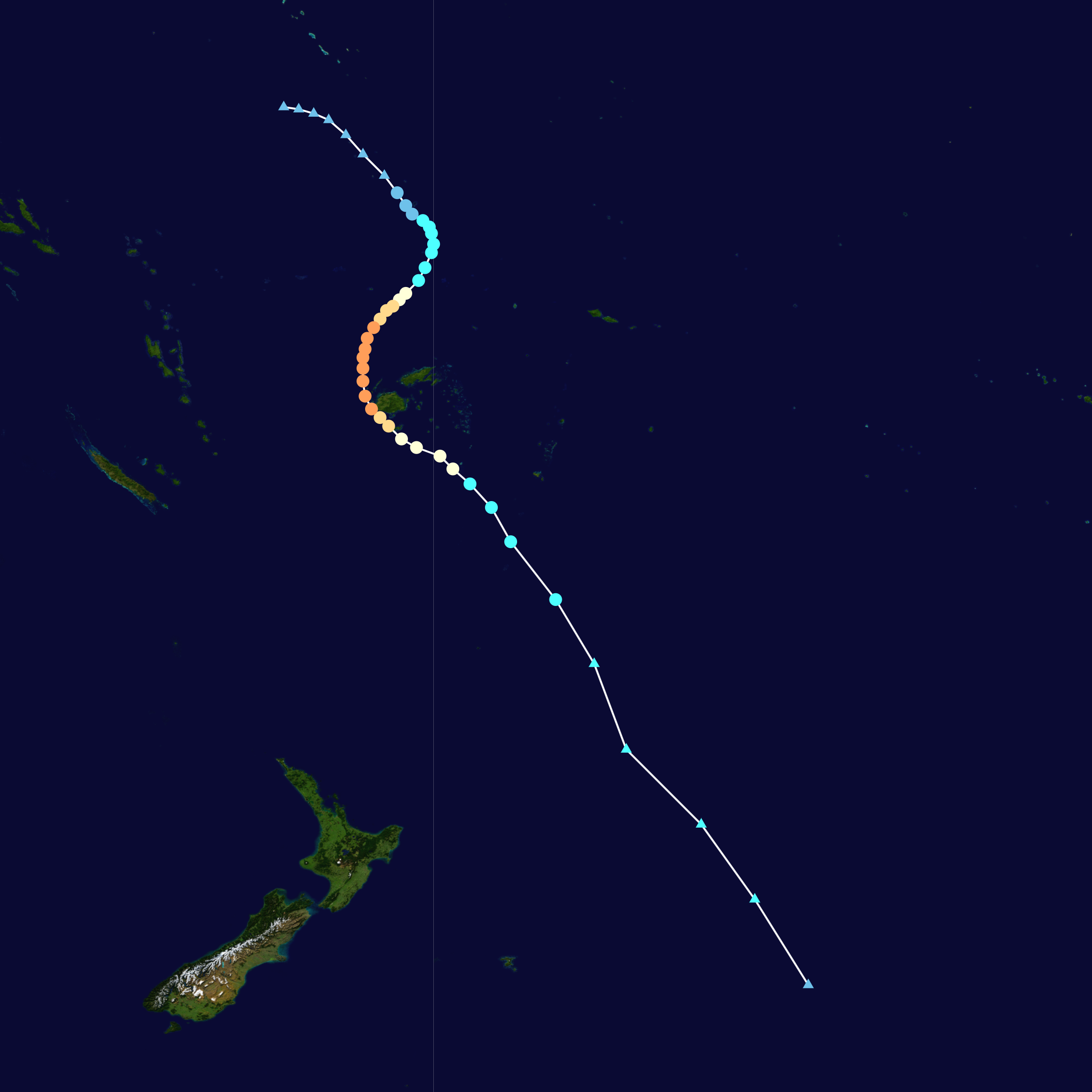
Map plotting the storm's track and intensity, according to the Saffir–Simpson scale Map key Saffir–Simpson scale Tropical depression (≤38 mph, ≤62 km/h) Tropical storm (39–73 mph, 63–118 km/h) Category 1 (74–95 mph, 119–153 km/h) Category 2 (96–110 mph, 154–177 km/h) Category 3 (111–129 mph, 178–208 km/h) Category 4 (130–156 mph, 209–251 km/h) Category 5 (≥157 mph, ≥252 km/h) Unknown Storm type Tropical cyclone Subtropical cyclone Extratropical cyclone, remnant low, tropical disturbance, or monsoon depression

At the start of December 1992, a shallow tropical depression developed along the South Pacific Convergence Zone in the vicinity of Tuvalu. Over the next few days the system persisted near Tuvalu, before it started to move south-eastwards and develop further during December 5. During December 6, the United States Joint Typhoon Warning Center designated the system as Tropical Cyclone 03P and initiated advisories, while the system was located on the 180th meridian about 180 km (110 mi) southeast of Funafuti, Tuvalu. Over the next couple of days, the system slowly deepened as it organised further and caused gale to storm force winds on the island of Niulakita and strong squally winds over the rest of Tuvalu. During December 7, the Fiji Meteorological Service (FMS) reported that the depression had developed into a Category 1 tropical cyclone on the Australian tropical cyclone intensity scale and named it Joni. After it had been named the system passed near Niulakita as it was steered towards the southwest by a low to mid level flow and intensified further.

The FMS classified Joni as a Category 3 severe tropical cyclone during December 9, after an eye had become apparent in satellite imagery. The system subsequently slowed down and started to recurve and move southwards towards Fiji, due to a weakness in the subtropical ridge of high pressure. Early on December 10, the FMS reported that Joni had peaked as a Category 4 severe tropical cyclone, with 10-minute sustained wind speeds of 165 km/h (105 mph). The JTWC also reported at around this time that the system had peaked with 1-minute sustained wind speeds of 205 km/h (125 mph), which made it equivalent to a Category 3 hurricane on the Saffir–Simpson hurricane wind scale. During that day Joni passed near or over the Fijian island groups of Yasawa and Mamanuca, before it passed about 55 km (35 mi) to the west of the main Fijian island: Viti Levu. At around 10:30 UTC (22:30 FST) on December 10, the system was successfully located on the Nadi weather radar, while it was located about 65 km (40 mi) to the west-southwest of Nadi. Over the next few hours the system was located by radar, until it passed near or over the island of Vatulele. After passing near the island, the system moved south-eastwards towards Kadavu and Ono-i-Lau, with the eye of the system passing directly over Kadavu during December 11. The system subsequently started to weaken and transition into an extratropical cyclone, as it entered a region of strong vertical wind shear and cooler sea waters. The system was declared to be an extratropical cyclone early on December 13, before it was absorbed by a mid-latitude trough of low pressure to the east of New Zealand during December 14.

== Preparations and impact ==
Severe Tropical Cyclone Joni impacted the island nations of Tuvalu and Fiji, while it also threatened the Fijian dependency of Rotuma and the French territory of Wallis and Futuna. The majority of the Tuvaluan islands suffered minor damage from Joni, while in Fiji the system caused a moderate to severe amount of damage. Due to the impact of this system, the name Joni was subsequently retired, from the list of names for the region by the World Meteorological Organization. This would normally mean that the name would not be used again in the region, however, the name remained on the list and was used during the 2008–09 season.

During its developing stages, Joni was the first of two tropical cyclones to affect Tuvalu during the 1992–93 season. As the system started to affect the islands during December 5, the FMS issued a gale warning for Niulakita, while strong wind warnings were issued for the rest of the island nation. Joni subsequently passed near Niulakita during December 7, where it caused gale to storm force winds and minor damage to the islands. The system also caused some damage to crops which were valued at AU$6,900 (US$5,000). A tropical cyclone alert was issued for Wallis and Futuna during January 6, while a gale warning was issued for Rotuma during January 7. There was subsequently no damage reported in either the French Territory or the Fijian dependency.

Between December 9–11, 1992, Joni became the first named tropical cyclone to directly impact the Fiji Islands since Severe Tropical Cyclone Sina of 1990. Joni caused a moderate to severe amount of damage to Viti Levu, with an overall damage total of about FJ$2 million (US$1.6 million). At various times between December 7 – 11, the whole of the main Fijian islands were placed under either a gale, storm or hurricane-force wind warning by the FMS. Ahead of the system affecting Fiji, international and domestic flights to and from the Nadi International Airport were cancelled during December 9 and 10, while ships and small boats in Lautoka were moved to a nearby river. Hundreds of tourists on Fiji's offshore islands were evacuated to the mainland before the cyclone hit, while around 350 elected to ride out the system at island resorts. Other preparations included the erection of hurricane shutters, while people rushed to stock up on supplies with shelves cleared of emergency supplies. On some islands, villagers were evacuated to community centres, schools and churches at the height of the storm.

Joni's impact on Fiji was generally confined to the Western Division, with the islands of Yasawa, Mamanuca, Viti Levu, Kadavu and Vatulele being the worst affected areas. The system caused high seas and widespread flooding including in several rivers on Viti Levu, which led to a substantial loss of livestock. In the immediate aftermath of the system a total of ten people were left missing, including a group of three fishermen in the Yasawa Islands. A group of three females on a fishing trip also went missing and were later found on an offshore island. A search party of four men went missing off Vanua Levu, while looking for the women, however, one swam ashore, while the other three were picked up by a cargo ship. Parts of Fiji's main cities of Suva, Nadi, and Lautoka were left without power, as falling trees brought down power lines. The Fijian Government reported that coconut plantations had been extensively damaged and that there was limited communications with the Western Division. Despite Joni's eye passing directly over Kadavu during December 11, the damage on the island was limited to wave induced coastal erosion, root crop damage and the loss of a few trees. The system passed near the wave rider station on the island, which recorded a peak wave height of about 7.2 metres (24 ft) as Joni made its closest point of approach. During December 12, an army helicopter was deployed to conduct a damage survey of offshore islands. A total of six people were subsequently arrested in Suva and Nadi on December 14, in relation to a series of burglaries, committed during power blackouts caused by the cyclone. Joni's damage in both Tuvalu and Fiji was exacerbated a month later, by Severe Tropical Cyclones Nina and Kina interacting with each other.

== See also ==
- Cyclone Evan
