= Cyclone Kina =

South Pacific cyclone in 1992 and 1993

Severe Tropical Cyclone Kina
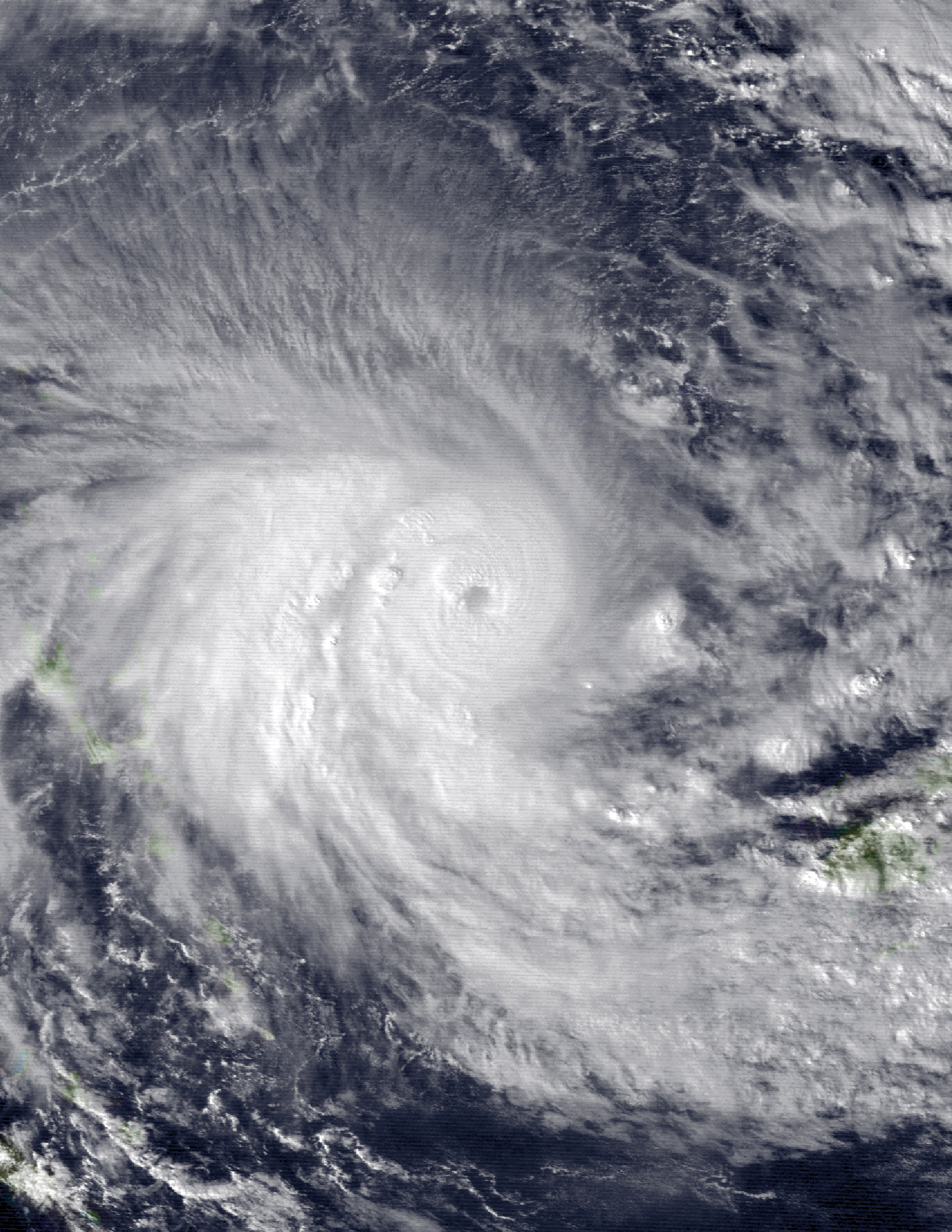
- Cyclone Kina northwest of Fiji on 29 December

Meteorological history
- Formed: 23 December 1992
- Dissipated: 5 January 1993

Category 3 severe tropical cyclone
- 10-minute sustained (FMS)
- Highest winds: 150 km/h (90 mph)
- Lowest pressure: 955 hPa (mbar); 28.20 inHg

Category 4-equivalent tropical cyclone
- 1-minute sustained (SSHWS/JTWC)
- Highest winds: 220 km/h (140 mph)
- Lowest pressure: 922 hPa (mbar); 27.23 inHg

Overall effects
- Fatalities: 26 total
- Damage: $110 million (1993 USD)
- Areas affected: Fiji; Tonga
- IBTrACS
- Part of the 1992–93 South Pacific cyclone season

Severe Tropical Cyclone Kina was the costliest storm to impact Fiji at the time. Total losses from Kina are estimated to be near $F170 million ($US110 million). The system was first noted as a tropical depression east of the Solomon Islands on 23 December. Over the next few days, the system moved south-eastwards and gradually developed further. It developed into a tropical cyclone on 26 December and was named Kina.

== Meteorological history ==
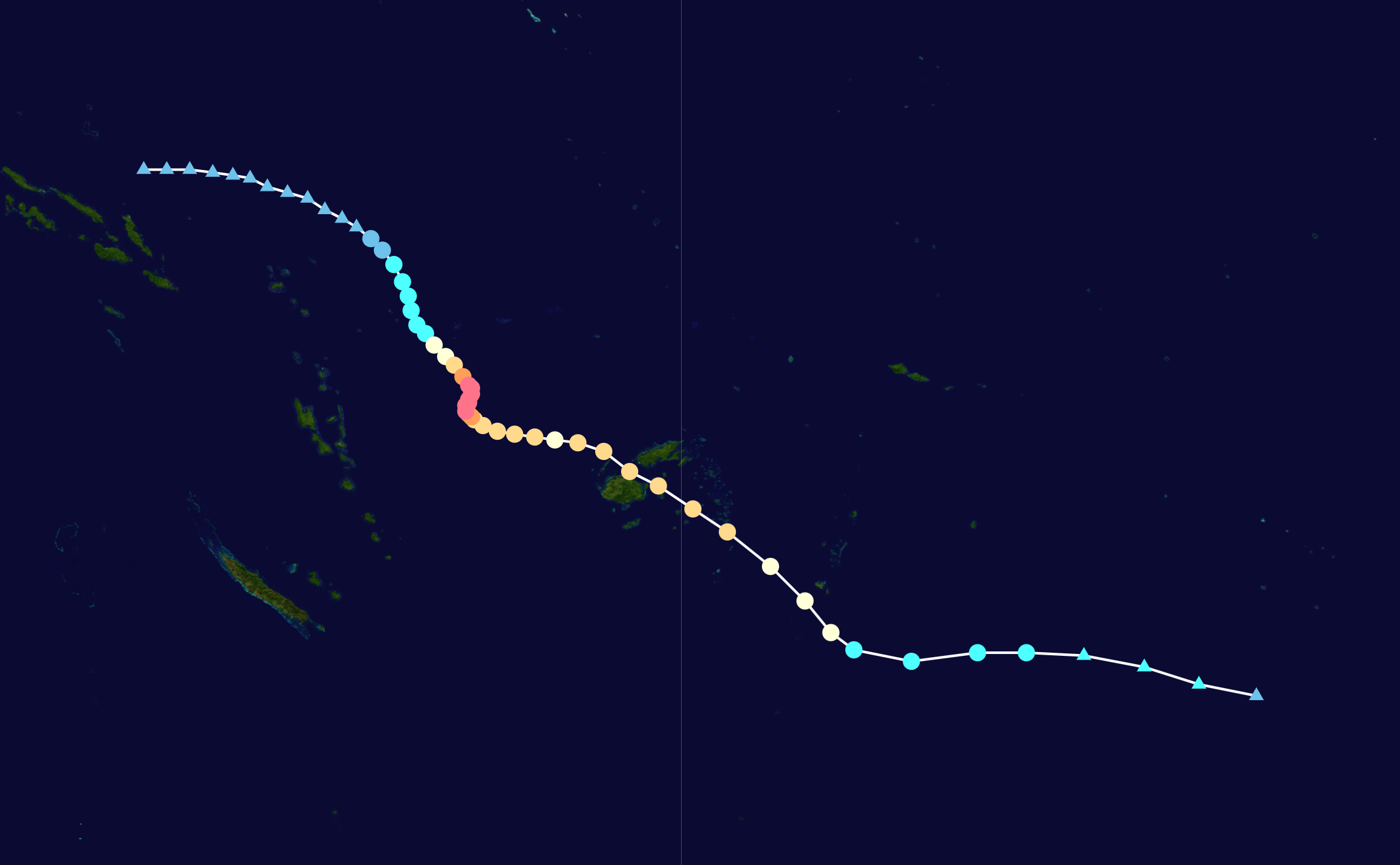
Map plotting the storm's track and intensity, according to the Saffir–Simpson scale Map key Saffir–Simpson scale Tropical depression (≤38 mph, ≤62 km/h) Tropical storm (39–73 mph, 63–118 km/h) Category 1 (74–95 mph, 119–153 km/h) Category 2 (96–110 mph, 154–177 km/h) Category 3 (111–129 mph, 178–208 km/h) Category 4 (130–156 mph, 209–251 km/h) Category 5 (≥157 mph, ≥252 km/h) Unknown Storm type Tropical cyclone Subtropical cyclone Extratropical cyclone, remnant low, tropical disturbance, or monsoon depression

During the middle of December 1992, an active phase of the Madden–Julian oscillation combined with a low-level equatorial surge and an upper-level ridge of high pressure, to provide favourable conditions for the development of several circulations within the monsoon trough. During 26 December, the Fiji Meteorological Service (FMS) started to issue gale warnings on one of the circulation and classified it as a tropical depression, while it was located just to the east of the Solomon Islands. During that day, as the depression started to develop further, the United States Joint Typhoon Warning Center initiated advisories on the system and designated it as Tropical Cyclone 07P. At this time, the system appeared to be moving south-southeastwards, which caused the FMS to think that the system posed a threat to the island nation of Vanuatu. The system continued to develop during 27 December, before it was named Kina by the FMS, after it had become a category 1 tropical cyclone on the Australian tropical cyclone intensity scale. The system subsequently continued to develop as it moved south-eastwards away from Vanuatu and environmental conditions became more favourable with a warm spot appearing on satellite imagery during 28 December.

During 29 December, the JTWC reported that Cyclone Kina had reached its peak intensity with 1-minute sustained wind speeds of 220 km/h (140 mph), which made the system equivalent to a category 4 hurricane on the Saffir-Simpson hurricane wind scale. At around the same time TCWC Nadi also reported that the system had reached its initial peak intensity, with 10 - minute sustained wind speeds of 150 km/h (90 mph) which made it a category 3 severe tropical cyclone on the Australian scale. The system subsequently remained at its peak intensity until early on 31 December, when it start to weaken and move eastwards towards the Yasawa island group. During the next day as the system approached the Northern Yasawa islands, Kina turned sharply towards the southeast, which made it pass between Fiji's two main islands of Viti Levu and Vanua Levu.

== Preparations and impact ==
Cyclone Kina impacted the island nations of Fiji and Tonga, while it also threatened Vanuatu during its developing stages. Kina was one of the most destructive tropical cyclones to affect Fiji, with parts of the archipelago experiencing the full brunt of a cyclone, for the first time in twenty years. Fiji also suffered its second-greatest ever financial loss from a tropical cyclone, as a result of Kinas strange track through the island nation. The only cyclone to cause more damage in Fiji was Winston of February 2016. Due to the impact of this system, the name Kina was subsequently retired, from the list of names for the region by the World Meteorological Organization.

Wettest tropical cyclones and their remnants in Fiji Highest-known totals
Precipitation			Storm	Location	Ref.
Rank	mm	in	Storm	Location	Ref.
1	1,139	44.84	Wally (1980)	Sakisa	
2	1,040	40.94	Kina (1992-93)	Monasavu dam	
3	913	35.94	04F (2016)	Monasavu dam	
4	755	29.72	Bebe (1972)	Naseuvou	
5	744	29.29	Ana (2021)	Dreketilailai	
6	697	27.44	Gavin (1985)	Monasavu dam	
7	615	24.21	Gavin (1997)	Monasavu dam	
8	545	21.46	June (1997)	Matei	
9	535	21.06	14F (2016)	Nadarivatu	
10	529	20.83	Evan (2012)	Monasavu dam	

The systems rain bands started to impact the island nation during 28 December, and over the next few days produced torrential rainfall throughout the archipelago. Strong winds were observed in the islands during 1 January and gradually increased to hurricane force over the next few days, as the system passed virtually through the middle of Fiji. As a result, most parts of the archipelago suffered moderate to severe damage was recorded, while 23 people were killed in Fiji by Kina mostly as a result of drowning and being struck by flying objects.

=== Tonga ===
Late on 2 January, the FMS issued a gale warning for the Tongan island groups of Haʻapai, Tongatapu and Vavaʻu, while the system was located about 555 km (345 mi) to the northwest of Nuku'alofa. During the next day as Kina moved more towards the south-southeast than had been expected, a hurricane warning was issued for Tongatapu, while a storm warning was issued for Haʻapai. Later that day the cyclone subsequently passed about 110 km (70 mi) to the southwest of Nuku'alofa. The FMS subsequently downgraded the warnings to gale force as the system moved rapidly towards the south, before all warnings were cancelled early on 4 January. Within the islands major damage was confined to the Tongatapu group where the system caused a moderate amount of damages, with severe damage reported to food crops while a minimal amount of damage was reported to dwellings. Within Nuku'alofa two people drowned, while another person was electrocuted.

=== Wallis and Futuna ===
In conjunction with Kina, Nina affected Wallis and Futuna between 3–4 January, however, there were no tropical cyclone warnings were issued for the French Territory by the FMS. Kina affected Futuna during 3 January, where sustained winds of up to 53 km/h (33 mph) and wind gusts of up to 69 km/h (43 mph) were recorded. Nina affected Wallis Island later that day where sustained winds of up to 80 km/h (50 mph) and wind gusts of up to 68 km/h (42 mph) were recorded. Within the islands some damage to crops and houses was reported.

=== Tuvalu ===
After Cyclone Joni affected Tuvalu the previous month, Nina and Kina indirectly impacted the island nation in early January 1993. The systems contributed to the strength of the westerly winds that were already present over the islands, with winds of up to 130 km/h (80 mph) reported throughout the islands. As these winds combined with a heavy westerly swell and high seas, where they caused flooding of up to 2 ft (0.61 m) over the islands of Nanumea, Nanumaga, Niutao, Nui and Vaitupu. As a result, damage was reported to crops and several buildings in the island nation, including thirty houses. The two cyclones caused a severe amount of erosion in the island nation, with the shoreline on Vaitupu, receding by about 5–6 m (16–20 ft). The Vaitupu Fisheries Harbour, that had only just been built during 1992, was seriously damaged by waves attributed to the two cyclones.

On the island of Nanumea, a poorly designed sea wall trapped the storm surge on the island, which caused salt water contamination of the island vegetation and killed several trees. An appeal for international assistance was subsequently made by the Government of Tuvalu, as supplies of food and other essentials like petrol and kerosene on the worst affected islands were running low. International assistance was subsequently provided, by the United Nations Department of Humanitarian Affairs, who provided an emergency grant of US$10,000. The European Commission also provided emergency aid to Tuvalu which enabled the Red Cross, to provide foodstuffs, shelter, medical supplies and utensils to people whose homes were destroyed.

== See also ==
- Cyclone Evan
