= Tropical cyclones in 1992 =

Year boundaries
- First system: Axel
- Formed: January 3, 1992
- Last system: Kina
- Dissipated: January 5, 1993

Strongest system
- Name: Gay
- Lowest pressure: 900 mbar (hPa); 26.58 inHg

Longest lasting system
- Name: Tina
- Duration: 25 days

Year statistics
- Total systems: 120
- Named systems: 93
- Total fatalities: 995 total
- Total damage: $33.926 billion (1992 USD)
Related articles
- 1992 Atlantic hurricane season
- 1992 Pacific hurricane season
- 1992 Pacific typhoon season
- 1992 North Indian Ocean cyclone season
- 1991–92 South-West Indian Ocean cyclone season
- 1992–93 South-West Indian Ocean cyclone season
- 1991–92 Australian region cyclone season
- 1992–93 Australian region cyclone season
- 1991–92 South Pacific cyclone season
- 1992–93 South Pacific cyclone season

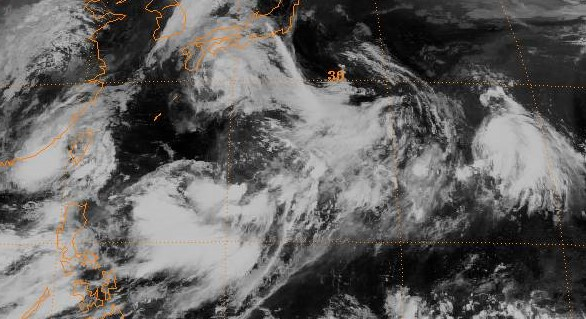
Tropical Storm Kent making landfall in Kyushu, Japan on August 18. In the vicinity of Kent are Lois, Mark and Nina, which were either tropical storms or tropical depressions at this time.

The year 1992 featured the highest amount of accumulated cyclone energy (ACE) on record, with an ACE rating of 1,163.1 units. It would be regarded as one of the most intense tropical cyclone years on record. Throughout the year, 111 tropical cyclones formed, of which 101 were given names by various weather agencies. Five Category 5 tropical cyclones would form in 1992.

Tropical cyclones are primarily monitored by a group of ten warning centers, which have been designated as a Regional Specialized Meteorological Center (RSMC) or a Tropical Cyclone Warning Center (TCWC) by the World Meteorological Organization. These are the United States National Hurricane Center (NHC) and Central Pacific Hurricane Center, the Japan Meteorological Agency (JMA), the India Meteorological Department (IMD), Météo-France, Indonesia's Badan Meteorologi, Klimatologi, dan Geofisika, the Australian Bureau of Meteorology (BOM), Papua New Guinea's National Weather Service, the Fiji Meteorological Service (FMS) as well as New Zealand's MetService. Other notable warning centres include the Philippine Atmospheric, Geophysical and Astronomical Services Administration (PAGASA), the United States Joint Typhoon Warning Center (JTWC), and the Brazilian Navy Hydrographic Center.

== Summary ==
=== North Atlantic Ocean ===
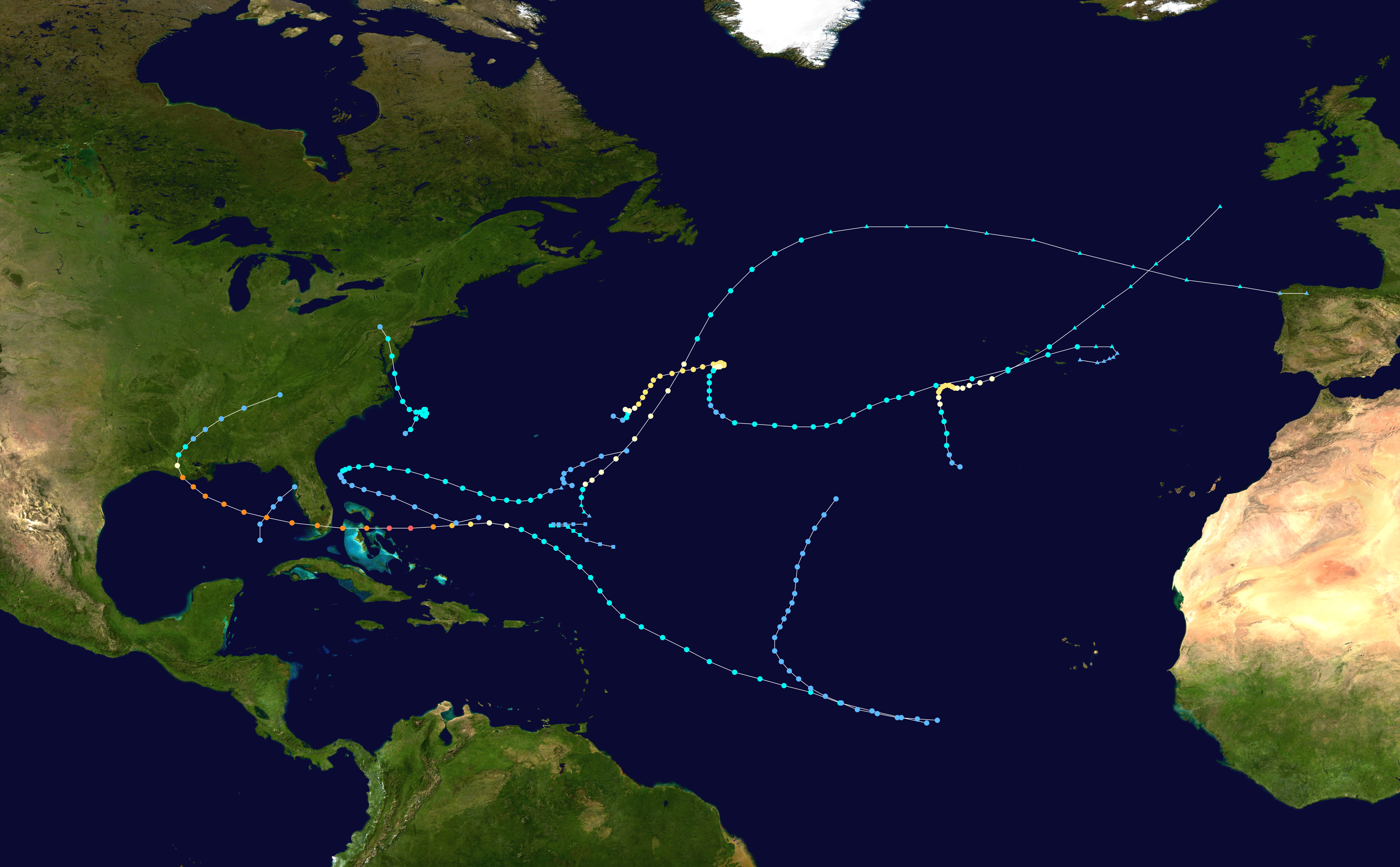
1992 Atlantic hurricane season summary map

The Atlantic Ocean had a below average season for 1992. The first hurricane was also the deadliest, strongest and costliest of the season, Hurricane Andrew. The storm brought catastrophic effects to The Bahamas and the state of Florida, killing 65 people in total, and causing over $27.3 billion in damages, making it the costliest Atlantic hurricane on record, until being surpassed by Hurricane Katrina in 2005.

=== Eastern & Central Pacific Oceans ===
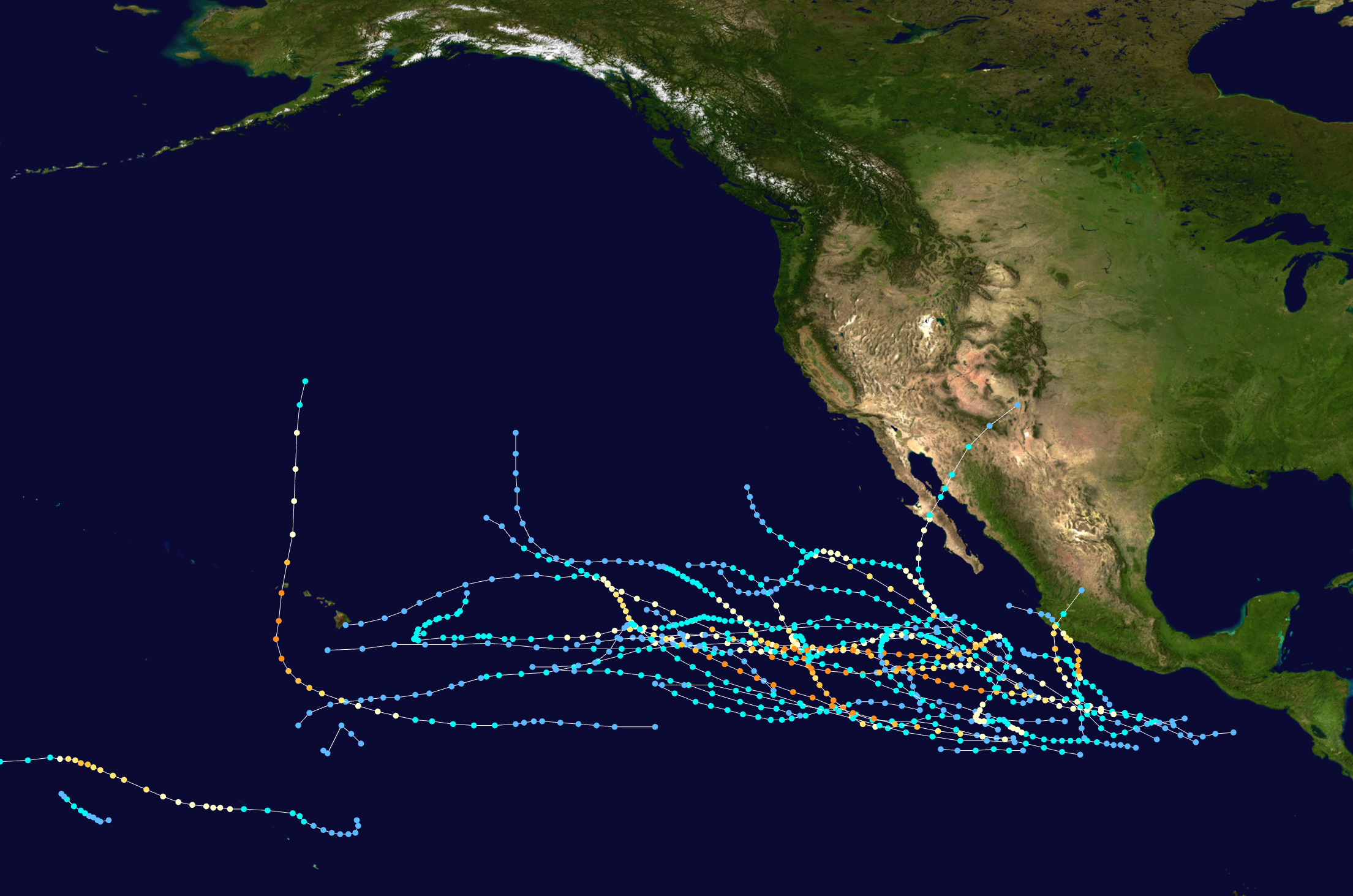
1992 Atlantic hurricane season summary map

=== North Indian Ocean ===
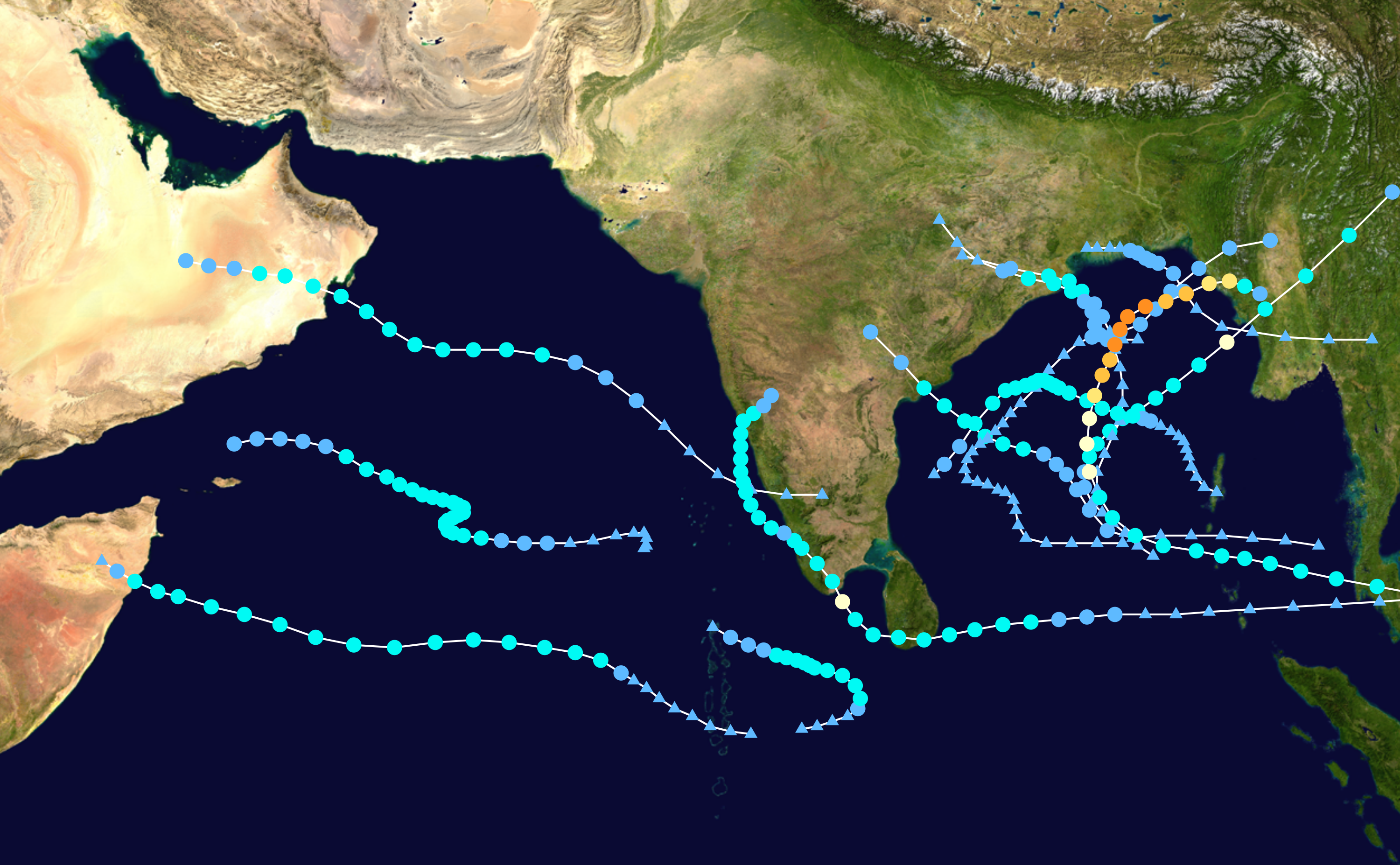
1992 North Indian Ocean cyclone season summary map

== Systems ==
=== January ===
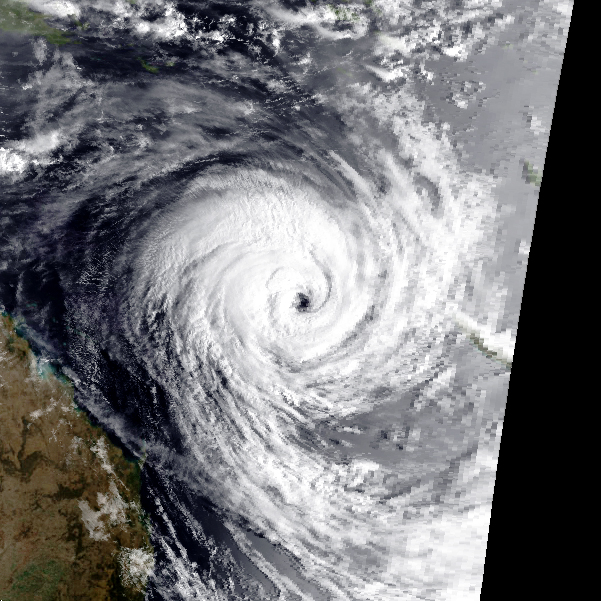
Cyclone Betsy

In January, the Intertropical Convergence Zone (ITCZ), which allows for the formation of tropical waves, is located in the Southern Hemisphere, remaining there until May. This limits Northern Hemisphere cyclone formation to comparatively rare non-tropical sources. In addition, the month's climate is also an important factor. In the Southern Hemisphere basins, January, at the height of the austral summer, is the most active month by cumulative number of storms since records began. Of the four Northern Hemisphere basins, none is very active in January, as the month is during the winter, but the most active basin is the Western Pacific, which occasionally sees weak tropical storms form during the month. January was mildly active, with six tropical cyclones forming, while four were named.

Tropical Storm Bryna from the South-West Indian Ocean persisted into 1992 and made landfall in Madagascar, dropping heavy rainfall and causing some damage and two deaths in Mahajanga. The year began with the formation of Severe Tropical Storm Axel in the Western Pacific Ocean on January 4. During its journey at sea, Axel caused havoc on some islands such as the Marshall Islands, Caroline Islands, and Mariana Islands in the Federated States of Micronesia; at least $1 million in damages occurred.

Tropical cyclones formed in January 1992
Storm name	Dates active	Max wind km/h (mph)	Pressure (hPa)	Areas affected	Damage (USD)	Deaths	Refs
Axel	January 4 – 15	100 (65)	980	Marshall Islands, Caroline Islands, Mariana Islands	$1 million	None	
Betsy	January 4 – 14	165 (105)	940	Vanuatu	Unknown	4	
Mark	January 7 – 10	100 (65)	980	Northern Territory, Queensland	$3.6 million	None	
16S	January 13	Unknown	1004	None	None	None	
13P	January 16–18	Unknown	Unknown	None	None	None	
Ekeka	January 28 – February 8	185 (115)	982	None	None	None	

=== February ===
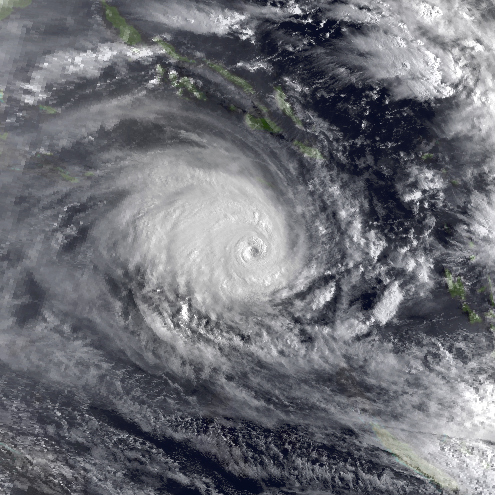
Cyclone Esau

In terms of activity, February is normally similar to January, with activity effectively restricted to the Southern Hemisphere excepting the rare Western Pacific storm. In fact, in the Southern Hemisphere, due to the monsoon being at its height, February tends to see more formation of strong tropical cyclones than January despite seeing marginally fewer overall storms. In the Northern Hemisphere, February is the least active month, with no Eastern or Central Pacific tropical cyclones and only one Atlantic tropical cyclone having ever formed in the month. Even in the Western Pacific, February activity is low: in 1992, the month had never seen a typhoon-strength storm, the first being Typhoon Higos in 2015. February 1992 was the record-breaking most active month ever recorded in the history of worldwide tropical cyclogenesis with twelve systems forming and ten storms getting named.

Tropical cyclones formed in February 1992
Storm name	Dates active	Max wind km/h (mph)	Pressure (hPa)	Areas affected	Damage (USD)	Deaths	Refs
Cliff	February 5–9	95 (60)	980	French Polynesia	Unknown	Unknown	
Celesta	February 8–14	85 (50)	985	None	None	None	
Daman	February 11–19	155 (100)	965	New South Wales	Unknown	Unknown	
Davilia	February 16–25	75 (45)	988	None	None	None	
18P	February 19–20	65 (40)	997	Queensland	Unknown	Unknown	
Elizabetha	February 22–26	65 (40)	992	Madagascar	Unknown	None	
Farida	February 24 –March 4	150 (90)	941	None	None	None	
Harriet-Heather	February 24 –March 8	215 (130)	930	Western Australia	$6 million	Unknown	
Esau	February 24 – Mar 9	185 (115)	925	Solomon Islands, Vanuatu, New Caledonia, New Zealand	Minimal	1	
Gerda	February 24 – March 4	65 (40)	992	Mauritius	None	None	
H1	February 26 – March 1	55 (35)	995	None	None	None	
Ian	February 27 – March 4	215 (130)	930	Western Australia	Minimal	None	

=== March ===
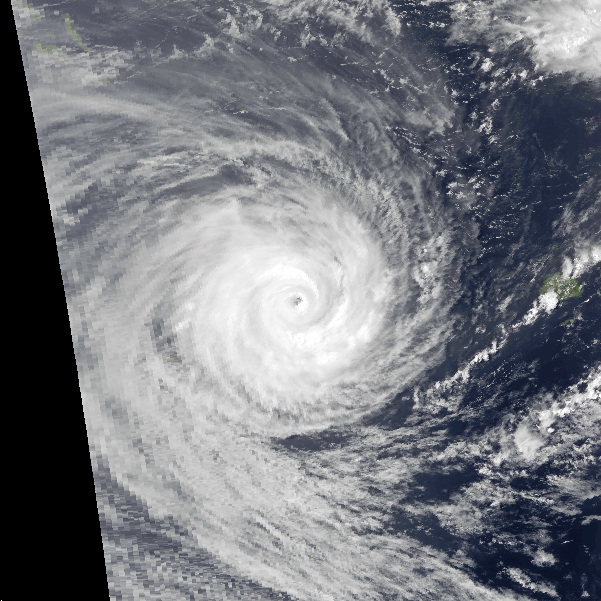
Cyclone Fran

During March, activity tends to be lower than in preceding months. In the Southern Hemisphere, the peak of the season has normally already passed, and the monsoon has begun to weaken, decreasing cyclonic activity, however, the month often sees more intense tropical cyclones than January or February. Meanwhile, in the Northern Hemisphere basins, sea surface temperatures are still far too low to normally support tropical cyclogenesis. The exception is the Western Pacific, which usually sees its first storm, often a weak depression, at some point between January and April.

In 1992, a total of four systems formed during March, all of them intensified into tropical storms. The most intense storm of the month was Cyclone Fran, which formed in the South Pacific Ocean on 4 March. It intensified to attain a pressure of 920 hPa (27.17 inHg), making Fran the most intense storm thus far in the year. In late March, meteorological conditions similar to what allowed Ekeka to develop persisted in the central Pacific. An area of convection organized into Tropical Depression Two-C, just north of 5˚N, atypically close to the equator, and far to the southwest of Hawaii. Moving west-northwestward, it slowly intensified, intensifying into a tropical storm on March 29. Upon doing so, the CPHC gave it the name Hali. Later that day, the storm attained peak winds of 50 mph (80 km/h), before increased southwesterly wind shear imparted weakening. Hali was downgraded to a tropical depression on March 30, and it dissipated shortly thereafter. It never affected land.

Tropical cyclones formed in March 1992
Storm name	Dates active	Max wind km/h (mph)	Pressure (hPa)	Areas affected	Damage (USD)	Deaths	Refs
Fran	March 4–17	205 (125)	920	Wallis and Futuna, Fiji, Vanuatu, New Caledonia, Australia	$9.4 million	5	
Gene	March 15–19	95 (60)	985	Cook Islands	Unknown	Unknown	
Hettie	March 23–29	75 (45)	987	French Polynesia	Minimal	None	
Hali	March 28–30	85 (50)	1004	None	None	None	

=== April ===
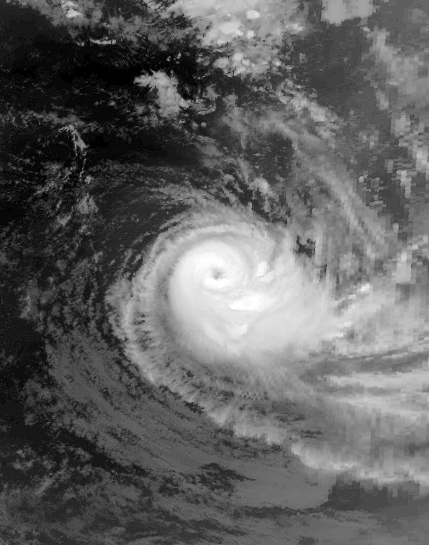
Cyclone Jane-Irna

The factors that begin to inhibit Southern Hemisphere cyclone formation in March are even more pronounced in April, with the average number of storms formed being hardly half that of March. However, even this limited activity exceeds the activity in the Northern Hemisphere, which is rare, with the exception of the Western Pacific basin. All Pacific typhoon seasons between 1998 and 2016 saw activity between January and April, although many of these seasons saw only weak tropical depressions. By contrast, only two Atlantic hurricane seasons during those years saw tropical cyclone formation during that period. With the combination of the decreasing temperatures in the Southern Hemisphere and the still-low temperatures in the Northern Hemisphere, April and May tend to be the least active months worldwide for tropical cyclone formation.

April 1992 was an example of this phenomenon, with only five tropical cyclones forming, and only three becoming tropical storms, making the month the second-least active of 1992. Of those two storms, the stronger was Tropical Cyclone Jane-Irna, which formed in the Australian region on 8 April and crossed over to the South-West Indian Ocean before dissipating on 14 April. Tropical cyclogenesis in the annual Atlantic hurricane season began with the development of Subtropical Storm One on April 21.

Tropical cyclones formed in April 1992
Storm name	Dates active	Max wind km/h (mph)	Pressure (hPa)	Areas affected	Damage (USD)	Deaths	Refs
Unnamed	April 7–8	Unknown	Unknown	None	None	None	
Neville	April 7–13	215 (130)	945	Northern Territory, Western Australia	Minimal	None	
Jane-Irna	April 8–19	215 (130)	930	None	None	None	
One	April 21–24	85 (50)	1002	None	None	None	
Innis	April 23 – May 2	95 (60)	985	Tokelau, Solomon Islands, Vanuatu	None	None	

=== May ===
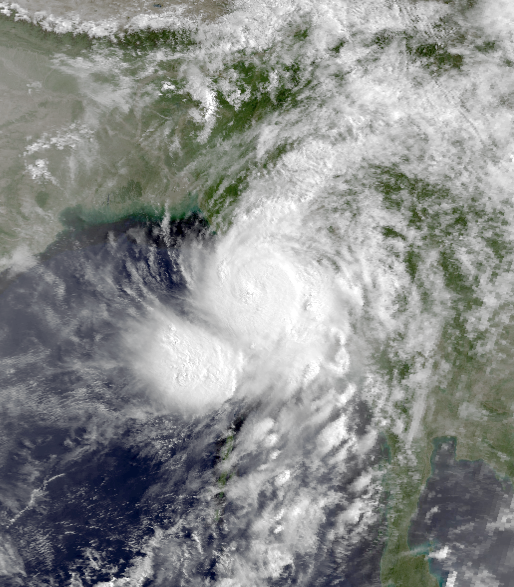
Cyclone BOB 01

Around the middle of May, the Intertropical Convergence Zone (ITCZ), which allows for the formation of tropical waves and has previously remained in the Southern Hemisphere for the first five months of the year, moves to the Northern Hemisphere, allowing the northern cyclone seasons to start in earnest. Without the presence of the ITCZ, Southern Hemisphere cyclones must form from non-wave sources, which are rarer. For that reason, cyclone formation is relatively sparse, with May tending to be the month of the final storm in each of the three basins. Meanwhile, more intense storms are nearly unheard of, with the South-West Indian Ocean having seen only one intense tropical cyclone and no very intense tropical cyclones in the month, and the other two basins having similar levels of activity in May. In the Northern Hemisphere, May is the first month most basins see activity, due to the new presence of the ITCZ. The Pacific hurricane season begins on May 15, and although the Atlantic hurricane season officially begins on June 1, off-season storms are very common, with over half of the 21st century seasons seeing a storm form in May. Although the North Indian Ocean has no official start or end date, due to the monsoon, mid-May is the beginning of a month-long period of high activity in the basin. Even in the Western Pacific, activity tends to increase throughout May.

Despite this phenomenon, May 1992 was the record-breaking least active month ever recorded in the history of worldwide tropical cyclogenesis with only one tropical cyclone within the month – BOB 01 – the first cyclonic storm of the 1992 North Indian Ocean cyclone season. Although Tropical Cyclone Innis was active in the month, it was counted for the month of April, as that was the month it formed in.

Tropical cyclones formed in May 1992
Storm name	Dates active	Max wind km/h (mph)	Pressure (hPa)	Areas affected	Damage (USD)	Deaths	Refs
BOB 01	May 16–20	65 (40)	992	Myanmar (Rakhine State)	Unknown	27–46	

=== June ===
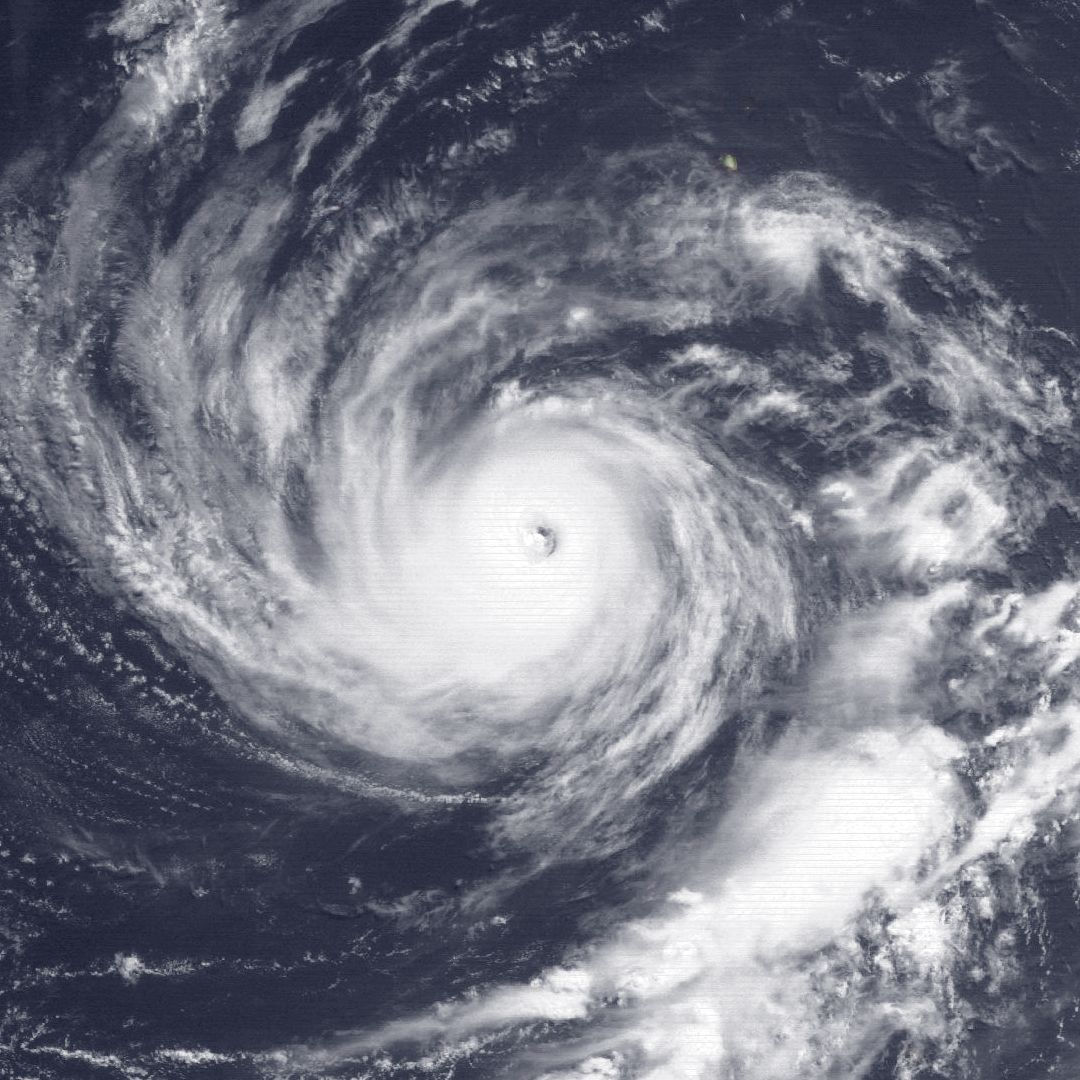
Hurricane Celia

June was active, with ten tropical cyclones forming, while six were named. Tropical Storm Agatha in the eastern Pacific Ocean killed 10 people in southwestern Mexico. Typhoon Bobbie, along with Typhoon Chuck in the western Pacific Ocean caused heavy rains and mudslides on the northern Philippine islands, causing $27.2 million in damage

Tropical cyclones formed in June 1992
Storm name	Dates active	Max wind km/h (mph)	Pressure (hPa)	Areas affected	Damage (USD)	Deaths	Refs
Agatha	June 1–5	110 (70)	990	Southwestern Mexico	Minimal	10	
ARB 01	June 5–12	85 (50)	994	None	None	None	
Two-E	June 16–19	55 (35)	1009	None	None	None	
BOB 02	June 17–18	55 (35)	980	India	Unknown	48-418	
Blas	June 22–23	65 (40)	1004	None	None	None	
Celia	June 22 – July 4	230 (145)	935	None	None	None	
Bobbie (Asiang)	June 23–30	165 (105)	940	Philippines, Japan	$27.2 million	None	
Chuck (Biring)	June 24 – July 1	130 (80)	965	Philippines, South China, Vietnam	Unknown	7	
One	June 25–26	55 (35)	1007	Cuba, Florida	$2.6 million	5	
Deanna	June 28 – July 3	75 (45)	1002	Caroline Islands	None	None	

=== July ===
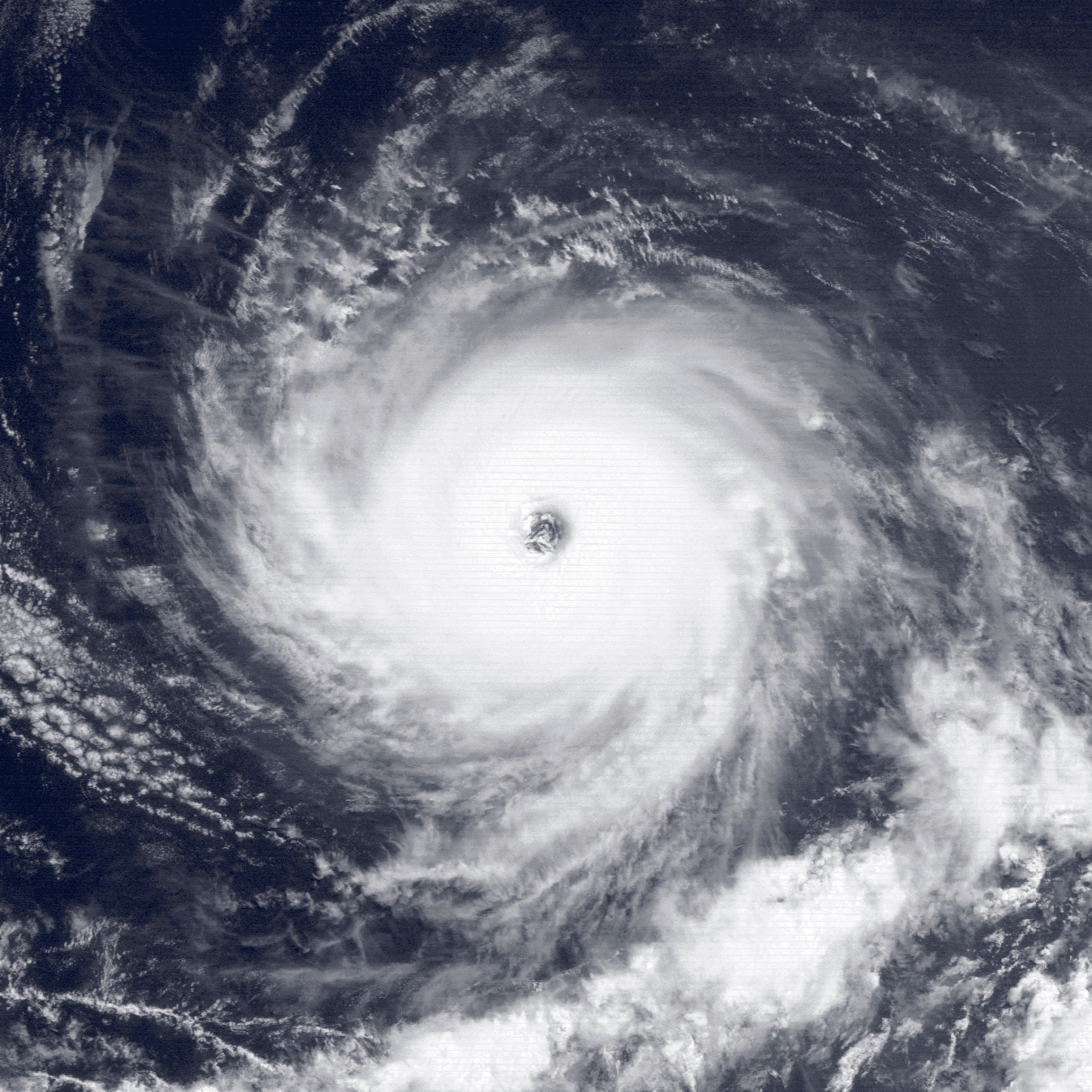
Hurricane Frank

July was very active, with sixteen tropical cyclones forming, while twelve were named. Hurricane Darby claimed three lives in its path.

Tropical cyclones formed in July 1992
Storm name	Dates active	Max wind km/h (mph)	Pressure (hPa)	Areas affected	Damage (USD)	Deaths	Refs
Darby	July 2–10	195 (120)	968	California	Minimal	3	
Eli (Konsing)	July 8–14	130 (80)	965	Caroline Islands, Philippines, South China, Vietnam	$235 million	1	
Estelle	July 5–12	220 (140)	943	None	None	None	
Frank	July 13–23	230 (145)	935	None	None	None	
Georgette	July 14–26	175 (110)	964	None	None	None	
Faye	July 15–18	65 (40)	1000	Philippines, South China	None	2	
Gary (Ditang)	July 17–24	100 (65)	980	Marshall Islands, Caroline Islands, Mariana Islands	$940 million	48	
Two	July 24–26	55 (35)	1015	None	None	None	
BOB 03	July 24–28	55 (35)	984	India			
Howard	July 26–30	100 (65)	992	None	None	None	
Helen	July 26–28	75 (45)	996	None	None	None	
Isis	July 28 – August 2	100 (65)	992	None	None	None	
TD	July 29	Unknown	1010	None	None	None	
Javier	July 30 – August 12	130 (80)	985	None	None	None	
TD	July 30–31	Unknown	1012	None	None	None	
Irving (Edeng)	July 31 – August 5	100 (65)	980	Japan, South Korea	$1 million	3	

=== August ===
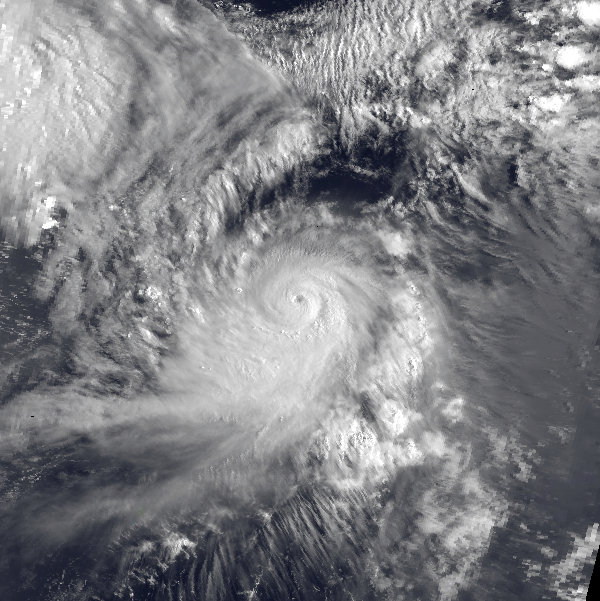
Typhoon Omar

Tropical cyclones formed in August 1992
Storm name	Dates active	Max wind km/h (mph)	Pressure (hPa)	Areas affected	Damage (USD)	Deaths	Refs
Janis (Gloring)	August 3–9	175 (110)	935	Caroline Islands, Mariana Islands, Japan	$45.6 million	2	
Kent	August 6–19	175 (110)	930	Marshall Islands, Japan	Unknown	5	
Twelve-E	August 10–12	55 (35)	1008	None	None	None	
Lois (Huaning)	August 14–21	65 (40)	996	None	None	None	
Mark	August 15–19	85 (50)	990	China, Taiwan	$10.4 million	1	
Andrew	August 16–28	280 (175)	922	Bahamas, Gulf Coast of the United States, Midwestern United States, Mid-Atlantic states	$27.3 billion	65	
Nina	August 17–21	65 (40)	996	None	None	None	
Kay	August 18–22	85 (50)	1000	None	None	None	
Lester	August 20–24	130 (80)	985	Northwestern Mexico, Southwestern United States, Central United States, Midwestern United States, Mid-Atlantic states	$45 million	3	
TD	August 23–24	Unknown	1008	Japan	None	None	
Omar (Lusing)	August 24 – September 9	185 (115)	920	Marshall Islands, Caroline Islands, Mariana Islands, Philippines, Taiwan, China, Ryukyu Islands	$561 million	15	
TD	August 25–26	Unknown	1000	None	None	None	
Madeline	August 27–30	85 (50)	999	None	None	None	
Newton	August 27–30	85 (50)	999	None	None	None	
Polly (Isang)	August 27 – September 1	100 (65)	975	Taiwan, Ryukyu Islands, China	$450 million	202	

=== September ===
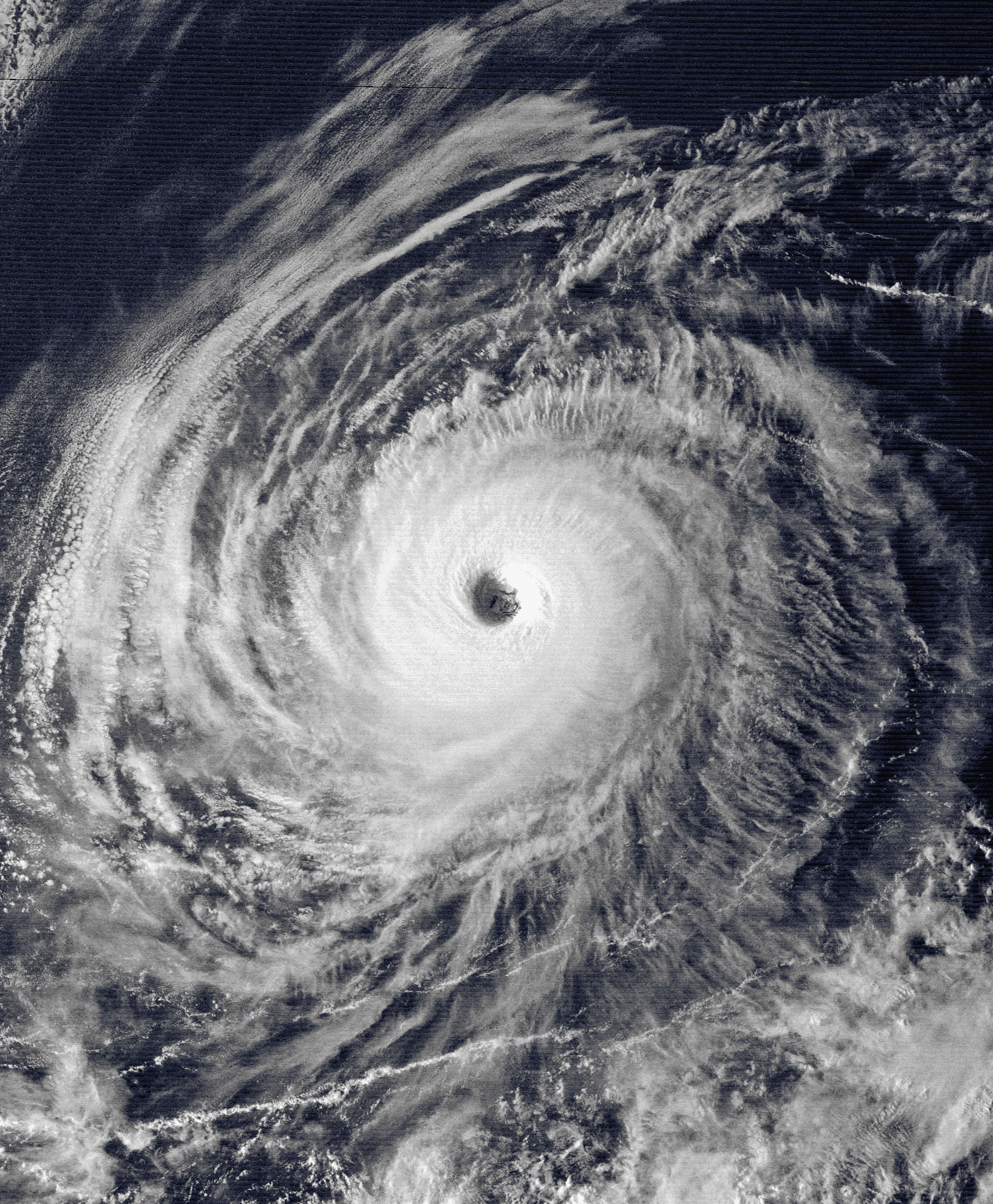
Hurricane Tina

Tropical cyclones formed in September 1992
Storm name	Dates active	Max wind km/h (mph)	Pressure (hPa)	Areas affected	Damage (USD)	Deaths	Refs
Ryan	September 1–11	155 (100)	945	Mariana Islands	None	None	
Orlene	September 2–14	230 (145)	934	None	None	None	
Sibyl	September 4–15	155 (100)	940	None	None	None	
Iniki	September 5–13	230 (145)	938	Hawaii	$3.1 billion	6	
Paine	September 11–16	120 (75)	987	None	None	None	
Roslyn	September 13–30	155 (100)	975	None	None	None	
Bonnie	September 17–30	175 (110)	965	Azores	None	1	
Seymour	September 17–27	140 (85)	980	None	None	None	
Tina	September 17 – October 11	240 (150)	932	Western Mexico	None	None	
Ted (Maring)	September 18–24	95 (60)	985	Philippines, Taiwan, East China, Korea	$360 million	61	
TD	September 19–20	Unknown	1004	South China, Vietnam	None	None	
Charley	September 21–27	175 (110)	965	Azores	Minimal	None	
Danielle	September 22–26	95 (60)	1001	North Carolina, Maryland, New England	Minimal	2	
05	September 22–25	55 (35)	1000	Bangladesh, India	None	None	
Val	September 24–27	85 (50)	990	None	None	None	
Seven	September 25 – October 1	55 (35)	1008	None	None	None	
Earl	September 26 – October 3	100 (65)	990	Florida, Georgia, North Carolina	None	None	
Ward	September 27 – October 7	155 (100)	945	None	None	None	
Avoina	September 29 – October 4	75 (45)	988	None	None	None	
ARB 02	September 30 – October 4	85 (50)	996	Oman, Saudi Arabia	None	None	

=== October ===
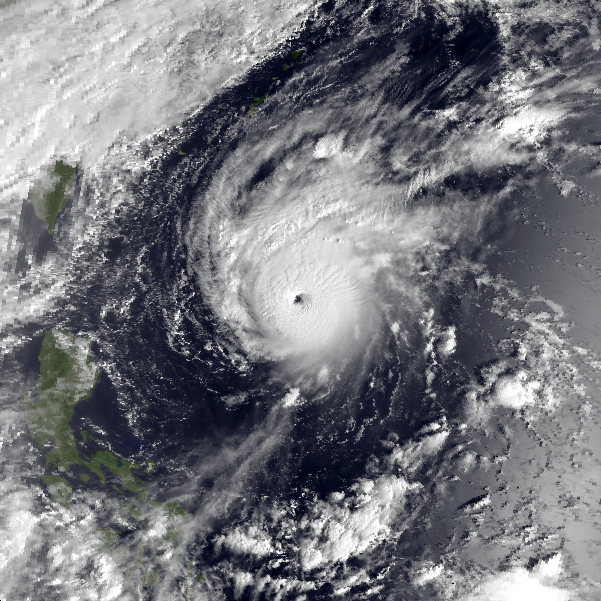
Typhoon Yvette

Tropical cyclones formed in October 1992
Storm name	Dates active	Max wind km/h (mph)	Pressure (hPa)	Areas affected	Damage (USD)	Deaths	Refs
Virgil	October 1–5	215 (130)	948	Southwestern Mexico	Minimal	None	
Winifred	October 6–10	185 (115)	960	Western Mexico	$5 million	3	
BOB 04	October 6–9	55 (35)	998	India	None	60	
TD	October 7	Unknown	1007	Vietnam	None	None	
Yvette (Ningning)	October 7–17	185 (115)	915	Philippines	None	None	
Zack	October 8–16	75 (45)	992	Marshall Islands	None	None	
Xavier	October 13–15	75 (45)	1003	None	None	None	
Yolanda	October 15–22	100 (65)	993	None	None	None	
Angela (Osang)	October 15–30	120 (75)	970	Philippines, Vietnam, Laos, Cambodia, Malaysia, Thailand	Unknown	49	
Brian	October 17–25	150 (90)	950	Caroline Islands, Marshall Islands	None	None	
Colleen (Paring)	October 17–25	100 (65)	985	Philippines, Vietnam, Cambodia, Laos, Thailand, Myanmar	Unknown	Unknown	
Babie	October 18–21	75 (45)	991	None	None	None	
BOB 05	October 22–25	65 (40)	996	Myanmar, Bangladesh	None	None	
Frances	October 13–27	140 (85)	976	Newfoundland, Iberian Peninsula	None	None	
Zeke	October 25–30	85 (50)	999	None	None	None	
Dan	October 25 – November 3	165 (105)	935	Marshall Islands	None	None	
Elsie (Reming)	October 29 – November 7	150 (90)	950	Caroline Islands, Marshall Islands	None	None	
29W	October 31 – November 2	45 (30)	1004	None	None	None	

=== November ===
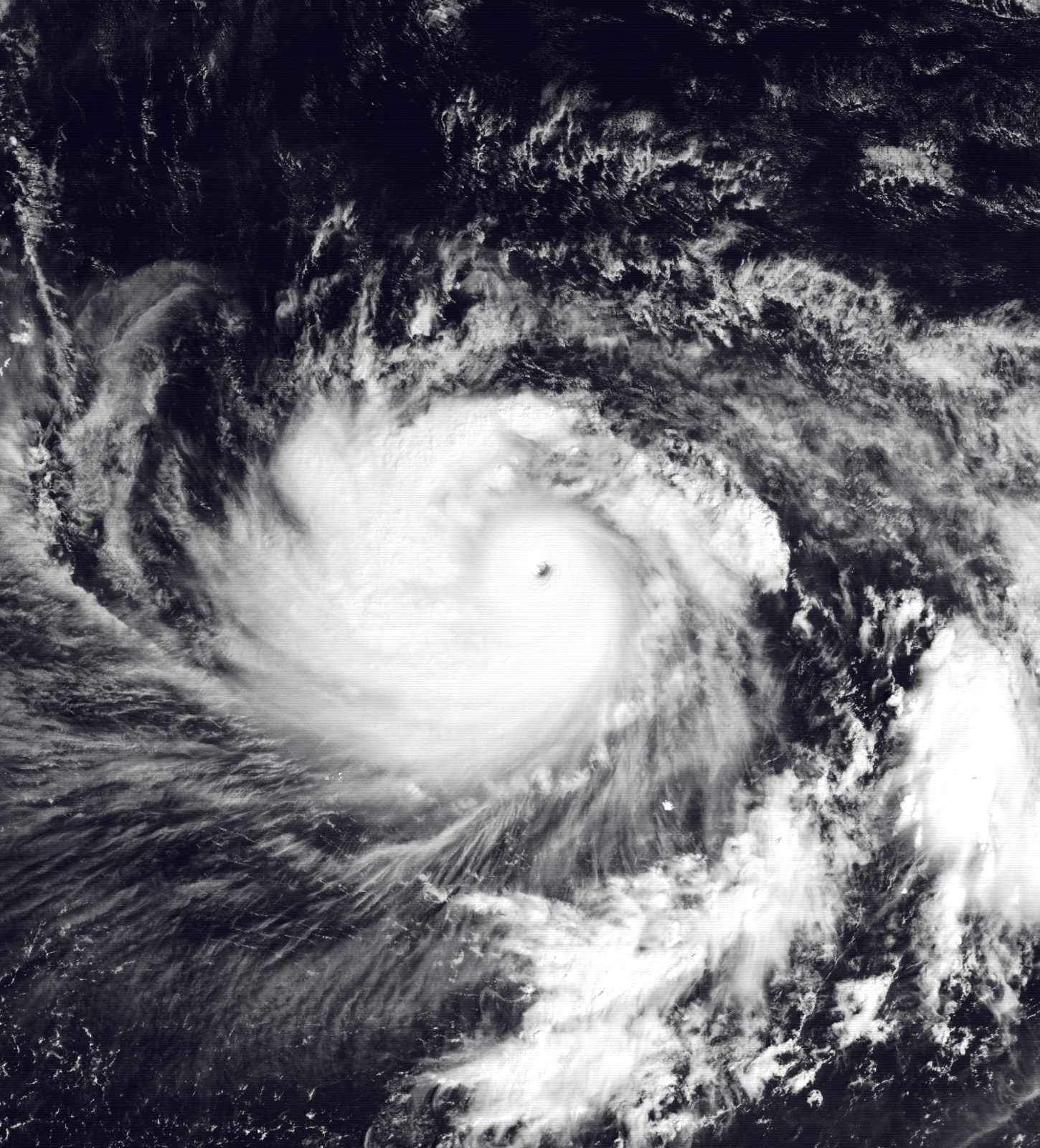
Typhoon Gay

Tropical cyclones formed in November 1992
Storm name	Dates active	Max wind km/h (mph)	Pressure (hPa)	Areas affected	Damage (USD)	Deaths	Refs
BOB 06	November 3–7	85 (50)	998	None	None	None	
TD	November 10–11		1008	Philippines	None	None	
BOB 07	November 10–17	100 (65)	988	Sri Lanka, India	$69 million	263	
Forrest	November 13–22	185 (115)	952	Bangladesh, Myanmar, Thailand	Unknown	2	
Gay (Seniang)	November 14–29	205 (125)	900	Marshall Islands, Caroline Islands, Mariana Islands, Guam, Japan, Aleutian Islands	None	1	
Hunt	November 15–21	165 (105)	940	Mariana Islands	None	None	
Three-C	November 22–23	55 (35)	1008	None	None	None	
ARB 03	November 30 – December 3	45 (30)	987	None	None	None	

=== December ===
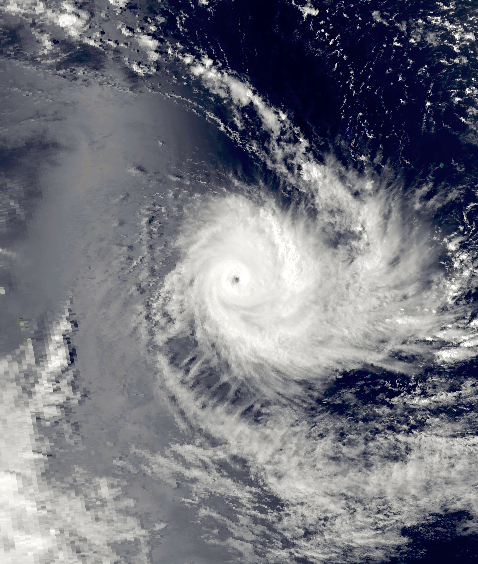
Cyclone Joni

Tropical cyclones formed in December 1992
Storm name	Dates active	Max wind km/h (mph)	Pressure (hPa)	Areas affected	Damage (USD)	Deaths	Refs
Joni	December 3–13	165 (105)	940	Tuvalu, Fiji	$1 million	1	
ARB 04	December 20–24	55 (35)	1002	Somalia	None	None	
Nina	December 21, 1992 – January 5, 1993	140 (85)	960	Queensland, Solomon Islands, Rotuma, Wallis and Futuna, Tuvalu, Tonga, Niue	$110 million	26	
Kina	December 26, 1992 – January 5, 1993	150 (90)	955	Fiji, Tonga	$110 million	26	

== Global effects ==
There are a total of nine tropical cyclone basins, seven are seasonal and two are non-seasonal, thus all eight basins except the Mediterranean are active. In this table, data from all these basins are added.

Season name		Areas affected	Systems formed	Named storms	Hurricane-force tropical cyclones	Damage (1992 USD)	Deaths	Ref
North Atlantic Ocean (Note: The wind speeds for this tropical cyclone/basin are based on the Saffir Simpson Scale which uses 1-minute sustained winds.)		Bahamas, Southeastern United States, Gulf Coast of the United States, Midwestern United States, Mid-Atlantic states, Azores, Newfoundland, Iberian Peninsula	10	6	4	$27.302 billion	73	
Eastern and Central Pacific Ocean		Northwestern Mexico, Southwestern United States, Central United States, Midwestern United States, Mid-Atlantic states, Western Mexico, Southwestern Mexico, Northwestern Hawaiian Islands	30	27	16	$3.15 billion	25	
Western Pacific Ocean (Note: Only systems that formed either before or on December 31, 1992 are counted in the seasonal totals.)		Marshall Islands, Caroline Islands, Mariana Islands, Philippines, Japan, Vietnam, Philippines, Taiwan, China, Ryukyu Islands, Korean Peninsula, Cambodia, Laos, Thailand, Myanmar, Aleutian Islands	39	30	23	$3,35 billion	463	
North Indian Ocean (Note: The wind speeds for this tropical cyclone/basin are based on the IMD Scale which uses 3-minute sustained winds.)		Bangladesh, Myanmar, India, Somalia	12	6	2	Unknown	398	
South-West Indian Ocean	January – June (Note: Only systems that formed either on or after January 1, 1992 are counted in the seasonal totals.) (Note: The wind speeds for this tropical cyclone are based on Météo-France, which uses wind gusts.)	Réunion, Madagascar, Mozambique	6	5	1	—N/a	—N/a	
South-West Indian Ocean	July – December	—N/a	4	2	1	—N/a	—N/a	
Australian region	January – June	Christmas Island, Western Australia, Queensland, Northern Territory, South Australia	5	5	4	$13.94 million	7	
Australian region	July – December	Queensland	2	2	1	—N/a	—N/a	—N/a
South Pacific Ocean	January – June	Vanuatu, French Polynesia, Tokelau, Queensland, New Zealand, Solomon Islands, New Caledonia, Wallis and Futuna, Fiji, Cook Islands	10	8	5	—N/a	2	
South Pacific Ocean	July – December	Tuvalu, Fiji, Tonga	2	2	2	$111 million	27	
Worldwide		(See above)	120 (Note: The sum of the number of systems in each basin will not equal the number shown as the total. This is because when systems move between basins, it creates a discrepancy in the actual number of systems.)	93	59	$33.926 billion	995 (Note: The number in the bracket indicates indirect deaths.)	

== See also ==
- Tropical cyclones by year
- List of earthquakes in 1992
- Tornadoes of 1992
