= Cyclone Fran =

South Pacific and Australian region cyclone in 1992

Severe Tropical Cyclone Fran
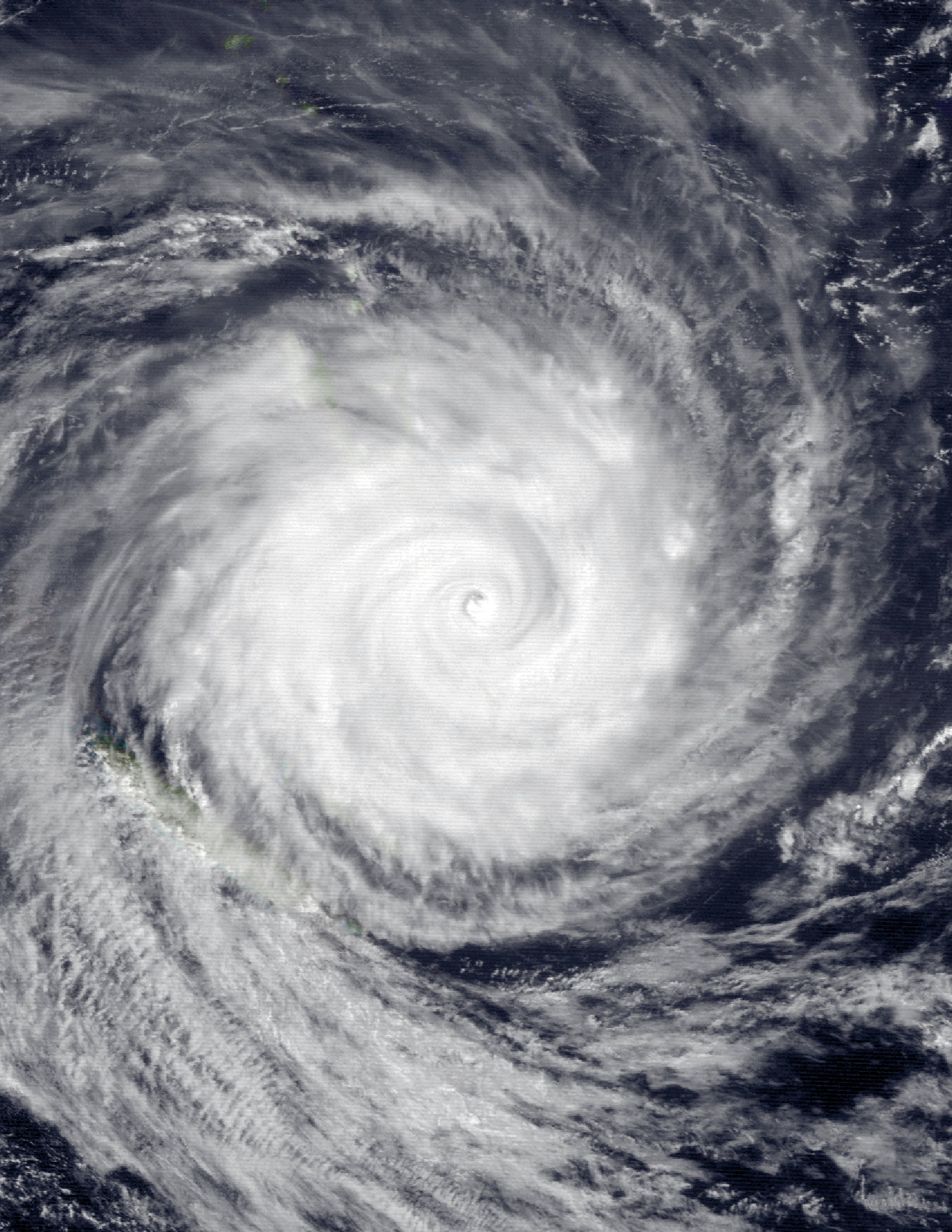
- Cyclone Fran at peak intensity on 9 March

Meteorological history
- Formed: 4 March 1992
- Extratropical: 17 March 1992
- Dissipated: 21 March 1992

Category 5 severe tropical cyclone
- 10-minute sustained (FMS)
- Highest winds: 205 km/h (125 mph)
- Lowest pressure: 920 hPa (mbar); 27.17 inHg

Category 5-equivalent tropical cyclone
- 1-minute sustained (SSHWS/JTWC)
- Highest winds: 260 km/h (160 mph)
- Lowest pressure: 898 hPa (mbar); 26.52 inHg

Overall effects
- Fatalities: 5 direct
- Damage: $9.4 million (1992 USD)
- Areas affected: Wallis and Futuna, Fiji, Vanuatu, New Caledonia, Queensland, Norfolk Island, New Zealand
- IBTrACS
- Part of the 1991–92 South Pacific and the Australian region cyclone seasons

Severe Tropical Cyclone Fran was the third tropical cyclone within four weeks to impact Vanuatu in 1992. Fran formed on 4 March and then gradually intensified, with winds reaching gale-force on 5 March, and hurricane-force a few days later. Few days later, Cyclone Fran reached severe tropical cyclone status near Vanuatu, and also became a powerful Category 5-equivalent on the Saffir–Simpson Hurricane Scale. The storm weakened somewhat due to land interaction, but briefly re-intensified after moving away from land. Fran gradually weakened over the next several days over less favorable conditions. Meanwhile, the storm passed north of New Caledonia. Eventually, as a Category 2 system on the Australian scale, Fran made landfall on Queensland on 16 March. Afterwards, Cyclone Fran turned towards the southeast and eventually headed back out to sea, eventually dissipating the next day. On Efate, over 130 houses lost roofs. Along Queensland, two rivers sustained major flooding, but no deaths were attributed to this cyclone. Total damage from the system was AU$8–10 million (1992 AUD). Moderate damage was also reported in Fiji. In New Caledonia, the storm brought flooding and landslides.

== Meteorological history ==
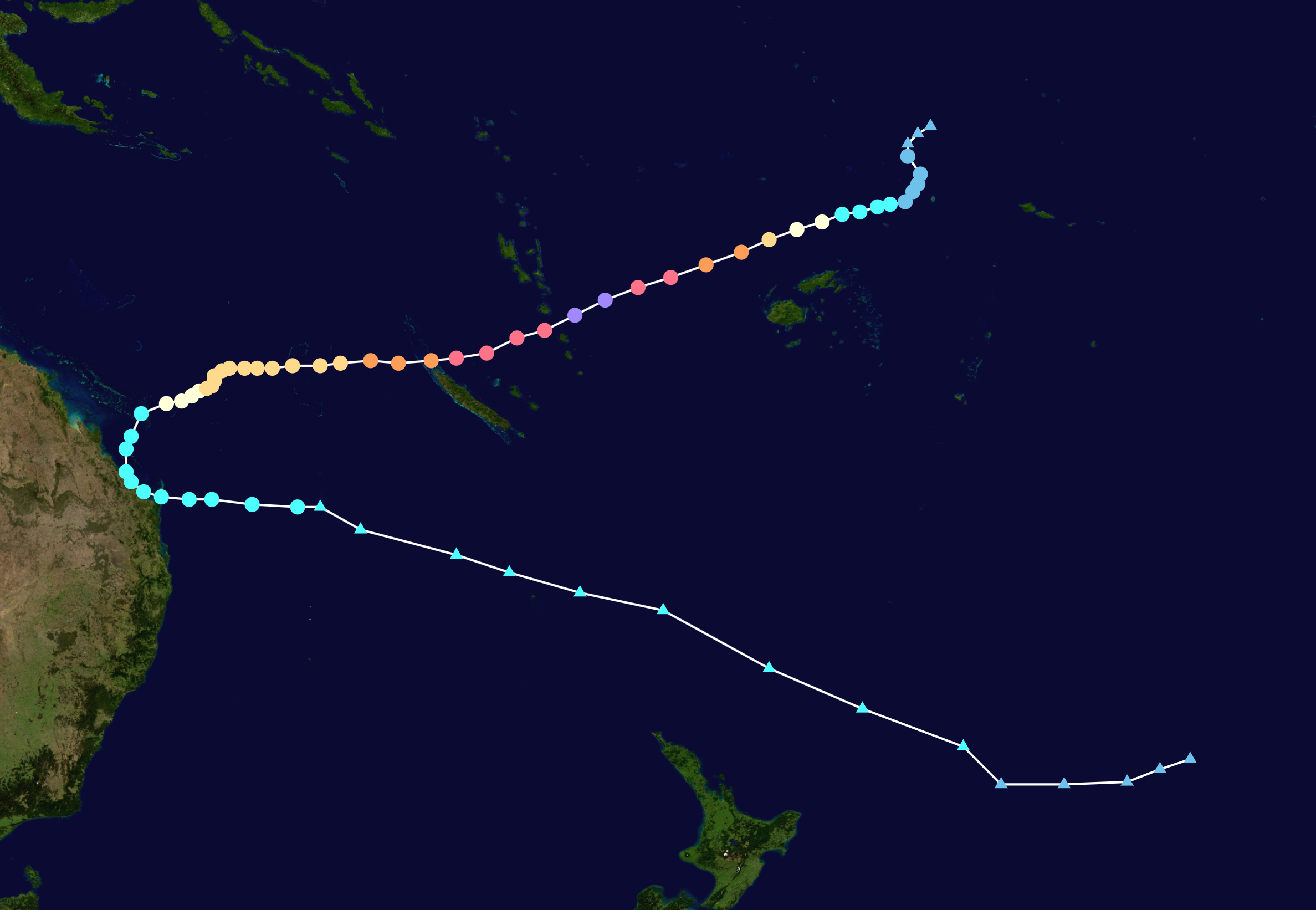
Map plotting the storm's track and intensity, according to the Saffir–Simpson scale Map key Saffir–Simpson scale Tropical depression (≤38 mph, ≤62 km/h) Tropical storm (39–73 mph, 63–118 km/h) Category 1 (74–95 mph, 119–153 km/h) Category 2 (96–110 mph, 154–177 km/h) Category 3 (111–129 mph, 178–208 km/h) Category 4 (130–156 mph, 209–251 km/h) Category 5 (≥157 mph, ≥252 km/h) Unknown Storm type Tropical cyclone Subtropical cyclone Extratropical cyclone, remnant low, tropical disturbance, or monsoon depression

During 4 March, as Severe Tropical Cyclone Esau was passing over New Caledonia, an area of convergence was approaching the French island of Wallis. As the system moved south-westwards towards Wallis, a circulation developed within this area of convergence and the Fiji Meteorological Service started to monitor it as a shallow tropical depression. Over the next day, the system slowly developed and organised further as it was steered south-southwestwards, in between the islands of Wallis and Futuna by a strong mid-level ridge of high pressure. At 18:00 UTC on 5 March, the FMS named it Fran, after it had developed gale-force winds and become a Category 1 tropical cyclone on the Australian tropical cyclone intensity scale. During the next day, the Naval Pacific Meteorology and Oceanography Center (NPMOC) initiated advisories on the system and designated it as Tropical Cyclone 25P. However, during 7 March, the United States Joint Typhoon Warning Center (JTWC) took over the issuance of advisories on Fran from the NPMOC, as it had crossed the 180th meridian into its area of responsibility.

Continuing to intensify, Fran was classified as a Category 3 severe tropical cyclone by the FMS during 7 March, as it passed around 400 km (250 mi) to the north of Suva, Fiji. As the system continued to intensify and move south-southwestwards, it posed a serious threat to the central islands of Vanuatu, including Efate, Tanna, Aneityum, Futuna and Erromango. On 8 March, the FMS reported that the system had peaked with 10-minute sustained windspeeds of winds of 205 km/h (125 mph), which made it a Category 5 Severe Tropical Cyclone on the Australian Scale. During that day, the JTWC reported that the system had peaked with 1-minute sustained windspeeds of 260 km/h (160 mph), which made it equivalent to a Category 5 hurricane on the Saffir–Simpson hurricane wind scale. After peaking in intensity, Fran continued to move south-southwestwards and passed in between the islands of Efate and Erromango during 9 March. The system emerged into the Coral Sea later that day and threatened New Caledonia, as it started to gradually weaken as a result of an increase in vertical windshear. The system passed to the north of New Caledonia as a Category 4 severe tropical cyclone at around 0000 UTC on 10 March, before it passed in between the Loyalty Islands of Belep and Surprise. Fran also moved across 160°E and into the Australian region as a Category 3 severe tropical cyclone during 11 March, where the Australian Bureau of Meteorology (BoM) started to issue warnings on the system.

Over the next few days, Fran maintained its intensity as a Category 3 severe tropical cyclone, as it slowed down and moved erratically towards Australia's Queensland Coast. On 14 March, the BoM reported that Fran had weakened into a Category 2 tropical cyclone, while it was located about 435 km (270 mi) to the northwest of Yeppoon in Queensland. By this time the system had started to move southwards and encounter vertical wind shear, from a mid-level ridge of high pressure to the southwest. The following day, Fran made landfall at around 17:00 UTC (04:00 AEST) on the Queensland coast, near the town of 1770 as a Category 2 tropical cyclone. After moving over land, Fran degenerated into a tropical depression before it recurved south-eastwards and moved back over the Coral Sea during 16 March. The system subsequently interacted with a mid-level trough of low pressure, which caused it to become an extratropical cyclone. This prompted the JTWC to issue their final warning on the system during 17 March, while it was located about 400 km (250 mi) to the northeast of Brisbane, Australia. Fran's extratropical remnants moved back into the South Pacific basin later that day, where they were monitored by New Zealand's MetService. Fran's remnants passed over Norfolk Island that same day, before they were last noted on 21 March, as they merged with a trough of low pressure to the north of New Zealand.

== Effects ==
The effects of Severe Tropical Cyclone Fran were felt over a large area of the Southern Pacific, as it impacted the island nations of Wallis and Futuna, Fiji, Vanuatu, New Caledonia and Queensland. Overall it was responsible for five deaths and the name Fran was later retired from the South Pacific lists of tropical cyclone names.

Tropical Cyclone Fran impacted the islands of Wallis and Futuna between 5 and 8 March, where damage to roofs, trees, telephones and power lines was reported. Rainfall totals of 556.7 mm (21.92 in) and 525.0 mm (20.67 in) were recorded in Hihifo and Mont Holo on 5 March, while a wind gust of 112 km/h (70 mph) was recorded in Hihifo during 6 March. The system subsequently went on to pass to the north of Fiji on 7 March, where no formal assessments of the damage took place. However, it was estimated by the Fiji National Disaster Management Office, that Fran had caused a minor-moderate amount of damage.

=== Vanuatu ===
After affecting both Fiji and Wallis and Futuna, Fran became the fourth of five tropical cyclones to impact Vanuatu during the 1991–92 season. Ahead of the system impacting the island nation between 8 and 10 March, various warnings were issued by the Vanuatu National Disaster Management Office, while people were urged to stay at home, schools were closed, flights cancelled and evacuation centres were opened. During 9 March, the system passed about 25 km (15 mi) to the north of Erromango and about 80 km (50 mi) to the south of the island of Efate as a Category 5 severe tropical cyclone. Erromango was estimated to have experienced hurricane-force winds of 130 km/h (81 mph), while storm force winds of 56 km/h (35 mph) and wind gusts of 146 km/h (91 mph) were experienced at Bauerfield International Airport. Damage was widespread but variable on Efate, with places that were exposed to the south and west of Fran worst hit, including the village of Pango located just outside Port Vila. The roofs of 130 homes were destroyed and as a result suffered water damage, including on the Parliamentary complex of buildings. Port Vila was without electricity and fresh water supply for several days, while there was major damage reported to several buildings. Roads were blocked and On Erromango considerable damage to crops was reported while several homes were damaged. It was thought by the Vanuatu Meteorological Service that if Fran had passed about 30 km (20 mi) to the north, then the situation would have been a lot worse.

=== New Caledonia ===
As Fran impacted Vanuatu, the whole of New Caledonia was placed under a pre-alert, before cyclone warning number 1 was issued for the French territory on 9 March. This warning required schools to close and advised people to take shelter indoors.

In New Caledonia, flooding and mudslides occurred. Winds of 220 km/h (140 mph) were measured on Poum. The highest rainfall total was 237 mm (9.3 in) on Tango Dzumac. A total of 150 boxes were damaged or destroyed.

=== Queensland ===
During 12 March, a tropical cyclone watch was issued by the BoM, for the Queensland coast between Bowen and Bundaberg, before it was upgraded to a tropical cyclone warning during the following day.

Floods affected Southern Queensland and some 17 houses were unroofed near Bundaberg.

On Heron Island, a small island off the Australian coast, winds of 45 mph (72 km/h) were reported, 60 mm (2.4 in) of rain fell in a day, and a storm surge of 0.8 ft (0.24 m) was estimated. Considerable damage to the trees were reported and many birds were killed, but no damage from buildings were reported. One Casuarina was lost during the cyclone. Significant erosion and loss of materials were reported. The cyclone continued the process of removing fine material from the top of the island. Despite significant beach erosion, there were no significant accumulation of fines on the reef and thus there were no harmful impacts to the flora and fauna on the coral reef.

In Australia, officials closed beaches along the Sunshine and Gold Coasts. In addition, train services from Brisbane were cancelled.

In preparation of the storm, officials closed beaches along the Sunshine and Gold Coasts. In addition, train services from Brisbane were cancelled. Across Queensland, coastal towns were flooded, uprooting trees and knocking out power. Several roofs were torn off of homes and some flooding was reported. Winds and flooding caused minor property damage, but considerable crop losses along were reported the coast, with the worst effects in Bundaberg. A total of 40 houses were uproofed throughout Bundaberg. In Burnett Heads, 3 yachts were damaged. Heavy swells caused damage on Heron Island and severe erosion on the Gold and Sunshine Coasts. Overall, 2,624 insurance claims were made because of property damage. Total damage from the system was 8–10 million (1992 AUD), while insurance losses were estimated at $2.5 million (1992 AUD).

== See also ==
- Tropical cyclones in 1992
