= Pango (disambiguation) =

Pango in computing is a library for rendering internationalized texts.

Pango may also refer to:

- Pango, an Israeli car parking payment company that created the Pango Mobile Parking App
- PANGO, party-affiliated non-governmental organization
- Pango Lineages, Phylogenetic Assignment of Named Global Outbreak Lineages, a system of classification for SARS-CoV-2, the virus that causes COVID-19
- Pango, a clone of the 1982 Pengo video game
- Pango Rhum, a brand of rum from Rhum Barbancourt
- Pango, a penguin-like monster from the mobile game My Singing Monsters
- Pango, an alternate Spanish spelling of Bangka (boat), traditional Filipino outrigger canoes
- Pango, Vanuatu, a village in Vanuatu

== See also ==
- Pago Pago (pronounced "pango pango"), the de facto capital of American Samoa
- Pangolin, a scaly anteater somewhat resembling a large armadillo
- Phylogenetic Assignment of Named Global Outbreak Lineages (PANGOLIN), a software tool to implement the PANGO nomenclature
