= Typhoon Chuck =

Pacific typhoon in 1992

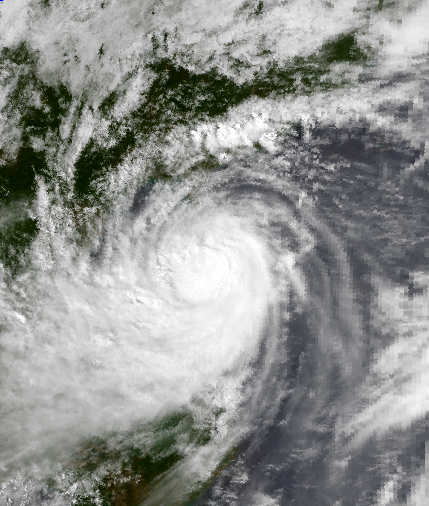
- Chuck near peak intensity on June 28

Meteorological history
- Formed: June 24, 1992
- Dissipated: July 2, 1992

Typhoon
- 10-minute sustained (JMA)
- Highest winds: 130 km/h (80 mph)
- Lowest pressure: 965 hPa (mbar); 28.50 inHg

Category 1-equivalent typhoon
- 1-minute sustained (SSHWS/JTWC)
- Highest winds: 150 km/h (90 mph)
- Lowest pressure: 964 hPa (mbar); 28.47 inHg

Overall effects
- Fatalities: 22 total (21 in Vietnam and 1 in Hainan)
- Injuries: 3
- Missing: 80
- Damage: $40.5 million (1992 USD)
- Areas affected: Philippines (primarily Southern Luzon), China, Hong Kong, Vietnam
- Part of the 1992 Pacific typhoon season

Typhoon Chuck was a moderately strong typhoon which impacted the Philippines, China, and Vietnam during June and July 1992. The third tropical depression, storm, and second typhoon of the 1992 Pacific typhoon season, Chuck originated over the central Philippines as part of a broader tropical cyclone outbreak on 21 June. Initially tracking slowly along the monsoon trough, Chuck interacted with Typhoon Bobbie, slightly recurving as a result. Strengthening due to favorable conditions, on June 27, Chuck intensified into a typhoon. The typhoon made landfall on the southern tip of Hainan Dao the next day, weakening slightly as it crossed the Gulf of Tonkin and struck northern Vietnam on June 29. Rapidly weakening soon after, Chuck dissipated on 2 July.

In Vietnam, at least 21 people died and while 80 were reported missing. Intense winds uprooted over 500 trees, downed electrical cables, and damaged about 140 houses in Hanoi. As a result of the storm, in the capital alone, three people were killed. Massive waves engulfed several coastal fishing villages in Cát Hải district, with seven people being missing there. Elsewhere, in Hainan, one person died. Combined with the effects of nearby Bobbie, heavy rainfall would produce mudflows, causing some rivers to rise up 6 ft (1.8 m). These rains loosened many tons of debris which were produced by Pinatubo in a prior eruption, sending them pouring down river channels to impact villages around the volcano. These effects also impacted Malaysia, causing several homes to suffer damage. Economic losses in Hainan are estimated at 223 million RMB (US$40.5 million).

== Meteorological history ==
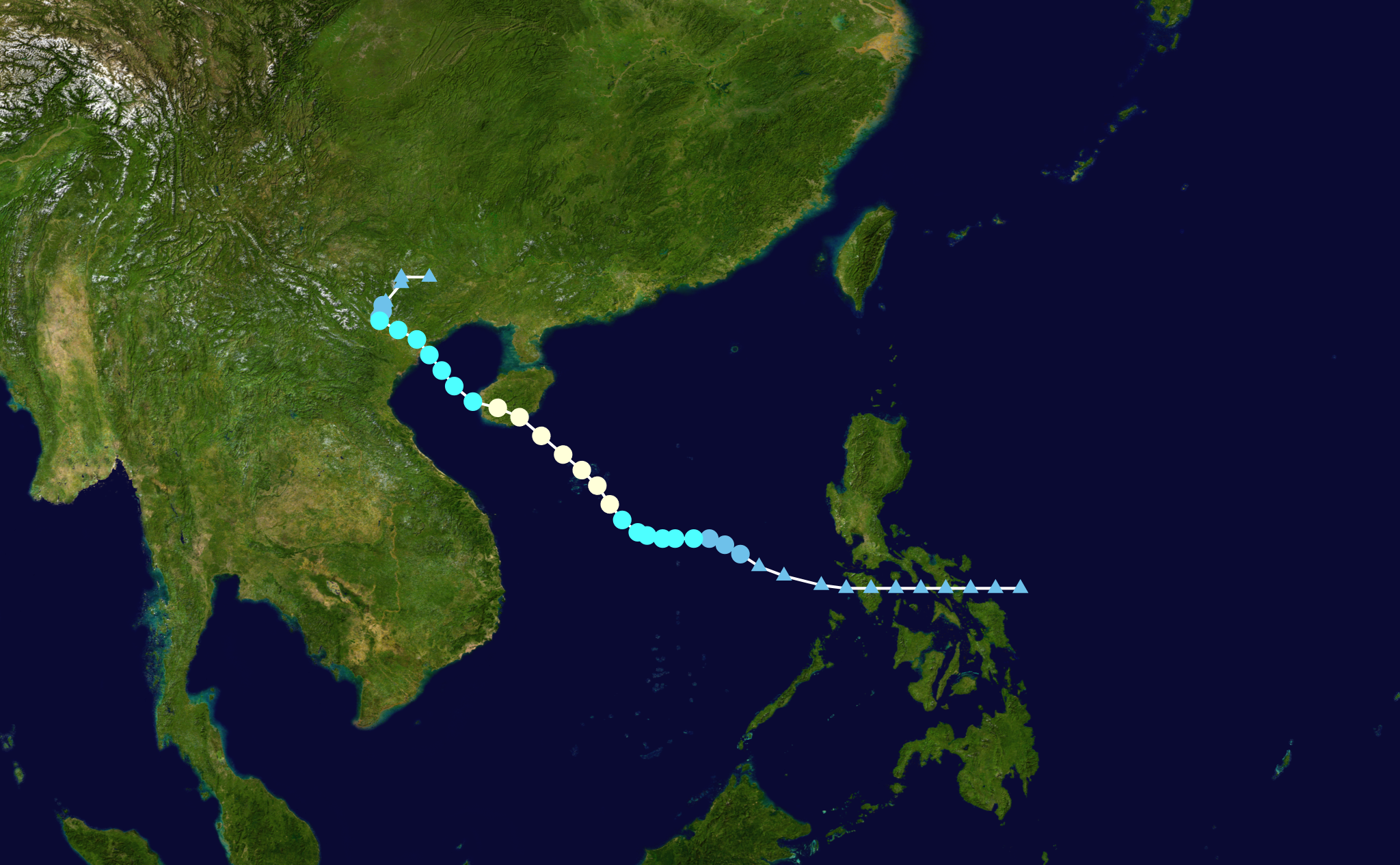
Map plotting the storm's track and intensity, according to the Saffir–Simpson scale Map key Saffir–Simpson scale Tropical depression (≤38 mph, ≤62 km/h) Tropical storm (39–73 mph, 63–118 km/h) Category 1 (74–95 mph, 119–153 km/h) Category 2 (96–110 mph, 154–177 km/h) Category 3 (111–129 mph, 178–208 km/h) Category 4 (130–156 mph, 209–251 km/h) Category 5 (≥157 mph, ≥252 km/h) Unknown Storm type Tropical cyclone Subtropical cyclone Extratropical cyclone, remnant low, tropical disturbance, or monsoon depression

On 19:00 UTC on 21 June, a tropical disturbance began developing over the central Philippines. Initially weakening as it traversed the Philippines, once it crossed into the South China Sea two days later, the convection of the disturbance began organizing. As a result, on 24 June, the Japan Meteorological Agency (JMA) noted that the disturbance had developed into a tropical depression. As it kept consolidating, the Joint Typhoon Warning Center (JTWC), an American military organization, issued a Tropical Cyclone Formation Alert (TCFA) on the disturbance later that day, issuing their first warning on it the next day as Tropical Depression 03W.

Several hours later, the JMA noted that Chuck had intensified into a tropical storm, causing the JTWC to name it Chuck around 12 hours later. Around that time, Chuck began undergoing a binary interaction with nearby Typhoon Bobbie, causing it to track west-northwest. Steadily intensifying, on 26 June, Chuck intensified into a severe tropical storm. Development kept occurring, and on 12:00 UTC the next day, both the JTWC and JMA noted that Chuck had become a typhoon. As a result, the JMA stated that Chuck peaked with 10-minute sustained winds of 80 mph (130 km/h) around that time. Just a few hours later, early on 28 June, the JTWC stated that Chuck peaked with 1-minute sustained winds of 90 mph (150 km/h).

Later that day, Chuck made landfall along the southern tip of Hainan island as a minimal typhoon. Weakening into a severe tropical storm several hours later as it crossed into the Gulf of Tonkin, Chuck made its second landfall around 100 mi (160 km) east-southeast of Hanoi early on 29 June. As a result of this, Chuck rapidly weakened, causing the JTWC to stop tracking it on 1 July. The JMA kept tracking Chuck, which had that point weakened into a tropical depression as it recurved into China the next day. As a result of landfall, the JMA noted that Chuck dissipated on 3 July.

== Preparations ==
In Đồ Sơn, a district in Haiphong, sluice gates to large canals opened a day prior to Bobbie's landfall, enabling around 200 fishing boats to return to harbour to find shelter.

In Hong Kong, the Hong Kong Observatory (HKO) hoisted Stand By Signal No. 1 on 27 June when Typhoon Chuck was about 690 km (430 mi) to the south-southwest. As Chuck neared Hong Kong, this was upgraded to Strong Wind Signal No. 3. All signals were lowered the next day, when Chuck was over Hainan Island.

== Impact ==
=== Vietnam ===
In the outskirts of the districts of Đồ Sơn and Kiến Thụy, Bobby sank several fishing boats and damaged parts of dams. Far north, in Hanoi, intense winds uprooted over 500 trees, downed electrical cables, causing blackouts for parts of the city, inundated streets, and damaged about 140 houses, the agency said. As a result of the storm, in Hanoi alone, three people were killed while another three were injured. Massive waves engulfed several coastal fishing villages in Cát Hải district, with the National Storm and Flood Control Committee reporting that seven people were missing. In total, in Vietnam, 22 people died while 80 were reported missing.

=== Elsewhere ===
Combined with the effects of nearby Bobbie, heavy rainfall would produce mudflows in the Philippines. These poured down the Bucao, Balinquero and Maraunot rivers, causing them to rise up 6 ft (1.8 m). The rains loosened many tons of debris which were produced by Pinatubo in a prior eruption, sending them pouring down river channels to impact villages around the volcano. Farther west, in Hong Kong, torrential rain on 28 June caused flooding in the southern part of Hong Kong Island, the Mid-levels and Western District. In Wong Chuk Hang, around 1 m (39 in) of storm surge was reported. A tall tree collapsed in Tin Hau Temple Road and another one toppled in Conduit Road. In Tsz Wan Shan, a signboard was blown to a state of near collapse. A pier was also damaged by sea waves in Shek Pik. No casualties were reported during the approach of Chuck. However, in Hainan, one person died. Finally, in Sabah, a state in Malaysia, Chuck alongside Bobbie damaged more than 100 homes.
