= Cyclone Betsy =

Category 4 South Pacific cyclone in 1992

Severe Tropical Cyclone Betsy
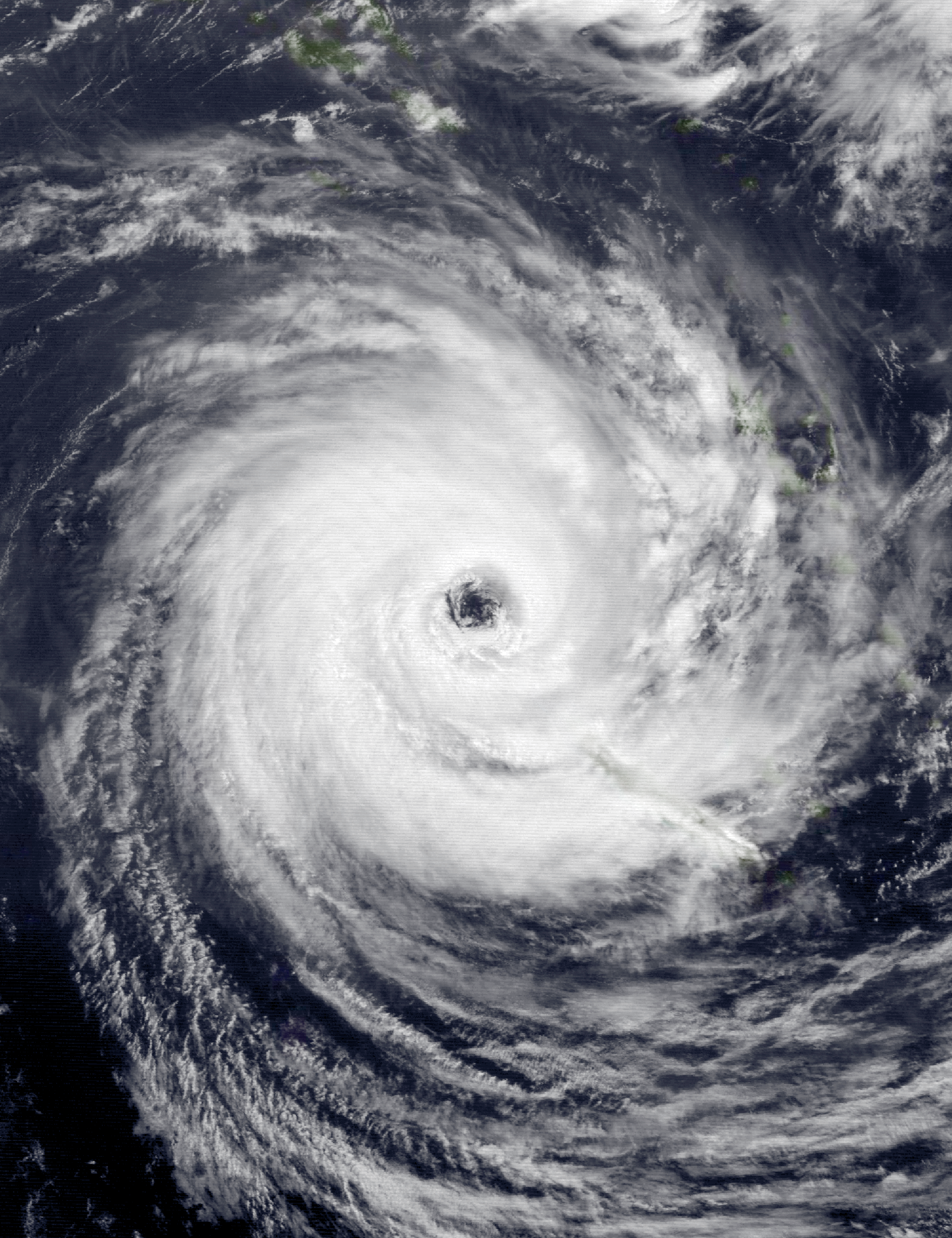
- Cyclone Betsy at its peak intensity on 10 January

Meteorological history
- Formed: 4 January 1992
- Extratropical: 15 January 1992
- Dissipated: 19 January 1992

Category 4 severe tropical cyclone
- 10-minute sustained (FMS)
- Highest winds: 165 km/h (105 mph)
- Lowest pressure: 940 hPa (mbar); 27.76 inHg

Category 2-equivalent tropical cyclone
- 1-minute sustained (SSHWS/JTWC)
- Highest winds: 175 km/h (110 mph)
- Lowest pressure: 948 hPa (mbar); 27.99 inHg

Overall effects
- Fatalities: 6 total
- Areas affected: Kiribati; Tuvalu; Solomon Islands; Vanuatu; New Caledonia
- IBTrACS
- Part of the 1991–92 South Pacific and the Australian region cyclone seasons

Severe Tropical Cyclone Betsy was a strong and long-lived tropical cyclone which impacted 8 island nations in the Pacific during the 1991–92 South Pacific cyclone season.

== Meteorological history ==
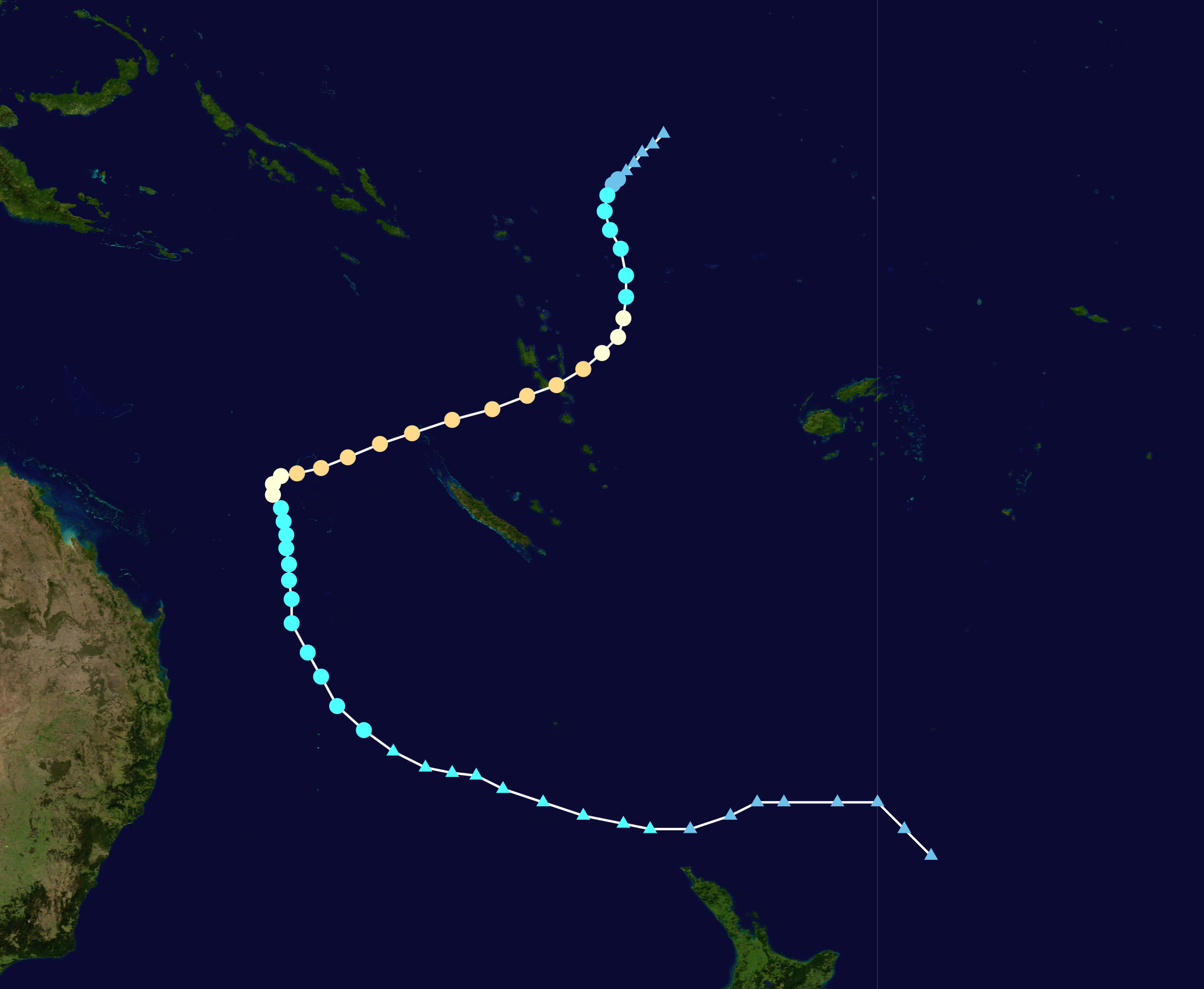
Map plotting the storm's track and intensity, according to the Saffir–Simpson scale Map key Saffir–Simpson scale Tropical depression (≤38 mph, ≤62 km/h) Tropical storm (39–73 mph, 63–118 km/h) Category 1 (74–95 mph, 119–153 km/h) Category 2 (96–110 mph, 154–177 km/h) Category 3 (111–129 mph, 178–208 km/h) Category 4 (130–156 mph, 209–251 km/h) Category 5 (≥157 mph, ≥252 km/h) Unknown Storm type Tropical cyclone Subtropical cyclone Extratropical cyclone, remnant low, tropical disturbance, or monsoon depression

In early January 1992, an equatorial westerly wind burst caused a surge of stronger than normal low level westerly winds, to develop on the northern side of the Southern Hemisphere monsoon trough to the east of New Guinea. Enhanced convection associated with the wind burst gradually became more organized and by late on January 5, a tropical depression had developed within the monsoon trough to the west of Tuvalu. Early on January 6, the Joint Typhoon Warning Center (JTWC) initiated advisories on the depression and designated it as Tropical Cyclone 11P, as it moved westwards. During that day the system gradually developed further with the cloud system becoming more symmetrical, while strong upper-level outflow and weak vertical wind shear favored further development. Later that day, the Fiji Meteorological Service (FMS) named the system Betsy at 19:15 Coordinated Universal Time (UTC), after the system had developed into a category 1 tropical cyclone on the Australian tropical cyclone intensity scale.

After being named the system moved erratically towards the south-southeast, as it interacted with a mid troposphere trough of low pressure. Throughout January 7, Betsy continued to intensify under the influence of a strong upper level anticyclone, located to its north and developed an eye feature. The system also passed about 95 km (60 mi) to the east of the Solomon Islands: Anuta, where winds of 85–100 km/h (55–60 mph) were recorded. Betsy subsequently changed its course and started to move towards the south-southwest, as it interacted with the upper level easterlies and a ridge of high pressure built to the south-east of the system. During February 8, the system became a category 3 severe tropical cyclone before it crossed central parts of Vanuatu early the next day, with the eye passing over, or very close to the islands of Ambrym and Malakula between 00:00 and 05:00 UTC.

== Preparations and impact ==
Betsy directly affected the Pacific island nations of Vanuatu, New Caledonia, New Zealand and the Solomon Islands, while it also indirectly affected the island nations of Papua New Guinea, Fiji, Tuvalu and Kiribati.

Tropical cyclone Betsy directly affected three countries, and indirectly affected two others. Some meteorological data reported from Vanuatu, the worst affected during the passage of Betsy.

=== Solomon Islands ===
Betsy impacted the Solomon Islands Temotu Province between January 6–8, which had been impacted by Severe Tropical Cyclone Tia seven weeks earlier. During January 7, the system passed about 95 km (60 mi) to the east of Anuta, where wind speeds of 85–100 km/h (55–60 mph) were recorded by the automatic weather station on the island. Later that day the system subsequently passed, about 160 km (100 mi) to the east of Tikopia during January 7.

=== Vanuatu ===
Cyclone Betsy was the second of six tropical cyclones to affect Vanuatu during the 1991–92 season, seven weeks after Severe Tropical Cyclone Tia brought gale-force winds to northern Vanuatu. The system affected Vanuatu between January 7–9, with gale, storm and hurricane-force winds reported at various locations around the island nation including on Malakula Island.

On January 10, Vanuatu's Minister for Foreign Affairs, formally submitted a request to donor countries for foreign aid. As a result of this request two aircraft a French Guardian and an Australian Orion, arrived in Vanuatu during the next day for surveillance operations. The planes completed their operations early on January 12 and returned to their countries, before a donor aid meeting involving the Australian, French, New Zealand and British high commissions was held later that day.

=== New Caledonia ===
Cyclone Betsy affected New Caledonia between January 9–10, and passed about 195 km (120 mi) to the north of the Belep islands. Gale-force winds associated with Betsy, were experienced as far south as Nouméa.

=== Other islands ===
Late on January 3, westerly winds of between 75–85 km/h (45–55 mph), were reported on the northern side of the monsoon trough in Nauru. At around the same time parts of Kiribati, were affected by squally westerly winds. Five people died in accidents related to the strong winds, including one when the roof of a mission building collapsed. During January 7, heavy swell generated by the system caused flooding and minor damage on the Northern Tuvaluan islands.

== See also ==
- Typhoon Axel (1992) - Betsy's twin tropical cyclone
