= Tropical Storm Axel (1992) =

Pacific tropical storm in 1992

Severe Tropical Storm Axel
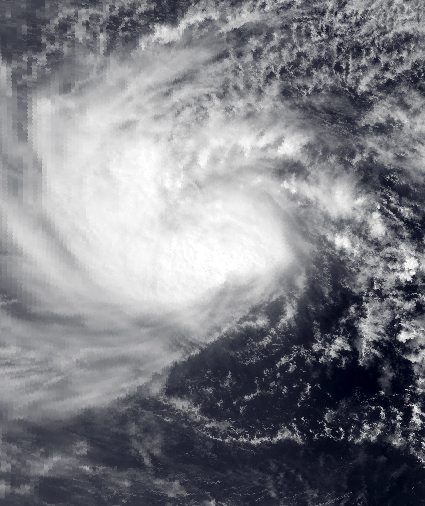
- Axel near peak intensity on January 9

Meteorological history
- Formed: January 4, 1992
- Dissipated: January 15, 1992

Severe tropical storm
- 10-minute sustained (JMA)
- Highest winds: 100 km/h (65 mph)
- Lowest pressure: 980 hPa (mbar); 28.94 inHg

Category 1-equivalent typhoon
- 1-minute sustained (SSHWS/JTWC)
- Highest winds: 130 km/h (80 mph)
- Lowest pressure: 972 hPa (mbar); 28.70 inHg

Overall effects
- Fatalities: None
- Injuries: Unknown
- Damage: ≥$1 million
- Areas affected: Marshall Islands, Caroline Islands, Mariana Islands
- Part of the 1992 Pacific typhoon season

Severe Tropical Storm Axel was a moderate tropical storm which affected the Marshall, Caroline, and Mariana islands in January 1992. The first tropical depression and storm of the 1992 Pacific typhoon season, Axel developed from a significant equatorial westerly wind burst east of New Guinea, alongside two other cyclones, Betsy and Mark, in the Southern Hemisphere, intensifying at an abnormally low latitude. By January 9, Axel had peaked as a high-end tropical storm, passing near Kosrae and Pingelap in the eastern Caroline Islands. Soon after, Axel began steadily weakening due to increased wind shear. As a result, just prior of passing south of Guam, Axel weakened into a tropical depression. Recurving northwards soon after, on January 15, Axel transitioned into an extratropical low, dissipating just a few hours later.

The worst cyclone to affect the Marshall Islands in over 70 years, Axel caused extensive damage, causing the Federal Emergency Management Agency (FEMA) to provide over $2 million in aid to more than 1,300 people. The storm destroyed airport runways, water reservoirs, crops, and vegetation, leaving many residents homeless. Majuro was severely impacted as high surf and flooding contaminated its primary water source and damaged infrastructure. Jaluit Atoll also suffered, with widespread flooding and destroyed sanitation facilities. In the eastern Caroline Islands, Axel caused significant crop loss and infrastructure damage, particularly to airstrips on Pingelap and Mokil atolls. The storm caused power outages and flooding on Pohnpei, but left Guam relatively unscathed as it weakened.

== Meteorological history ==
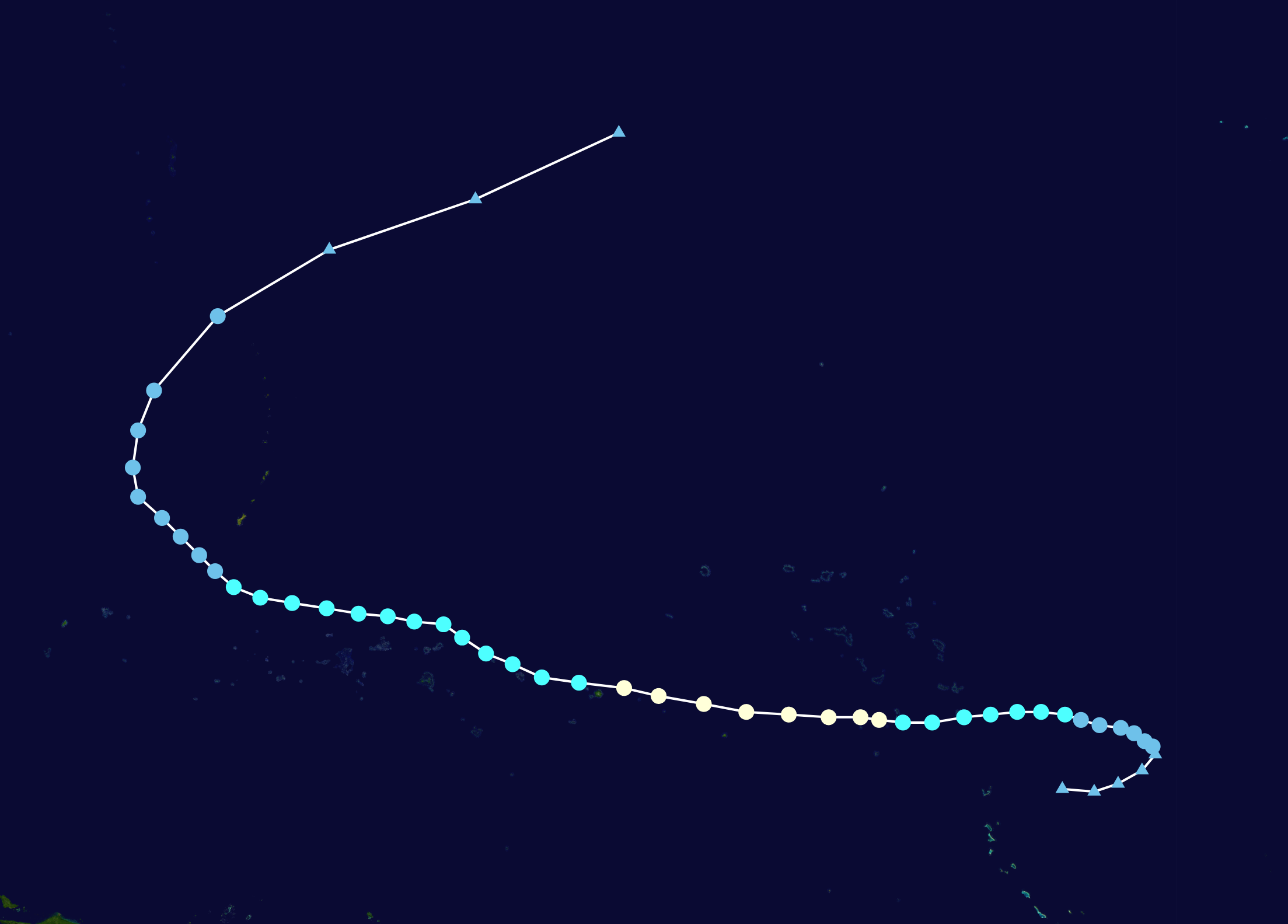
Map plotting the storm's track and intensity, according to the Saffir–Simpson scale Map key Saffir–Simpson scale Tropical depression (≤38 mph, ≤62 km/h) Tropical storm (39–73 mph, 63–118 km/h) Category 1 (74–95 mph, 119–153 km/h) Category 2 (96–110 mph, 154–177 km/h) Category 3 (111–129 mph, 178–208 km/h) Category 4 (130–156 mph, 209–251 km/h) Category 5 (≥157 mph, ≥252 km/h) Unknown Storm type Tropical cyclone Subtropical cyclone Extratropical cyclone, remnant low, tropical disturbance, or monsoon depression

On January 2, stronger-than-normal low-level westerlies were observed east of New Guinea. As a result of these increased winds and an area of cloudiness, two areas of convection formed: the predecessor to Axel, which was north of the Equator, and the predecessor to Betsy, which was south of the Equator. The next day, both areas of convection were coalescing as the westerly winds died down. As a result, on 12:00 UTC on January 4, the Japan Meteorological Agency (JMA) noted that the northern area of convection had developed into a tropical depression. This was at an abnormally low latitude, forming at 4.9°N. Several hours later, the Joint Typhoon Warning Center (JTWC), an American military organization, issued a Tropical Cyclone Formation Alert (TCFA) on the depression, issuing their first warning on the cyclone later that day. Early on January 6, both the JTWC and JMA had noted that the tropical depression had intensified into a tropical storm, causing the former agency to name it Axel.

As a result of favorable upper-level divergence, Axel was able to significantly intensify, with the JMA noting that the cyclone had developed into a severe tropical storm the next day. Despite the JMA stating that Axel did not develop further until January 9, the JTWC noted that Axel had intensified into a typhoon just a few hours after being a tropical storm. Soon after, they noted that Axel had peaked with 1-minute sustained winds of 65 mph (100 km/h) while the JMA stated that Axel had peaked with 10-minute sustained winds of 80 mph (130 km/h). However, on January 10, Axel tracked into an environment with high wind shear, causing it to weaken. As a result, three days later, both the JMA and JTWC noted that Axel had weakened into a tropical depression. Two days later, Axel had transitioned into a weak extratropical low, causing both agencies to stop tracking it.

== Preparations and impact ==
Majuro experienced peak wind gusts of 85 km/h (53 mph) as Axel passed 139 km (86 mi) to the south. This coincided with high tide, causing a storm surge of 4.0–4.9 m (13–16 ft). This broke pipes and washed sand, coral rock, and debris onto the island, causing the Majuro's water supply to be contaminated. Almost 250 mm (10 in) of rain from Axel fell in the island in a day. The worst typhoon to affect the Marshall Islands in over 70 years, waves produced by Axel flooded homes and cars while gusts amounting to 100 mph (160 km/h) destroyed scores of houses, submerging houses and cars in knee-deep water and leaving hundreds homeless. This caused many coral off the coast of the capital to be scoured, causing heavy coral debris alongside rubble to be seen in the island, including the Marshall Islands International Airport. After passing Majuro, Axel passed across Jaluit Atoll, causing over 1.2 m (4 ft) of water to cover most of the main islands. As a result of Axel's winds, a majority of the outhouses were destroyed, resulting in serious health concerns for the islanders. Farther north, a weakening Axel affected Kwajalein Atoll and Guam, only producing near-gales.

In the eastern Caroline Islands, Kosrae experienced gusts of 120–148 km/h (75–92 mph) resulting in severe crop losses, damaged fauna, and several structures being destroyed. In nearby Pingelap and Mokil, the airstrips suffered significant damage, causing the runways to be closed for months afterward for repairs. Some wood and tin roofed structures were destroyed, and an estimated 50-60% of the small vegetation, such as bananas, were lost. As Axel passed just north of Pohnpei, the island's electrical power was knocked out for several hours and many buildings in low-lying areas flooded. In those islands, a storm surge of fifteen feet was recorded, with a daily total of 247 mm (9.73 in) of rain seen. In the Federated States of Micronesia, at least $1 million in damages occurred.

== Aftermath ==
Following Axel's passage across the islands, the islands and atolls of Kili, Ailinglaplap, Arno, Jaluit, Majuro, Mili, Pohnpei, Kosrae, Mwoakilloa, and Pingelap were declared as disaster areas. The President of the United States at the time, George H. W. Bush, issued an Emergency Disaster Proclamation for the Marshall Islands due to Axel's extensive damage. On February 11, around a month after Axel struck the islands, Bush authorized extra federal aid for portions of Micronesia to recover from Axel. In Majuro, a severe drought of freshwater occurred, causing many imported plants in the island to die off. Church humanitarian services from the Church of Jesus Christ of Latter-day Saints donated 1,000 pounds of clothing and 20 tents for people who had suffered during the storm.

== See also ==
- Typhoon Zelda (1991)
- Typhoon Pamela (1976)
- Tropical Storm Bavi (2015)
