= Typhoon Bobbie =

Pacific typhoon in 1992

Typhoon Bobbie (Asiang)
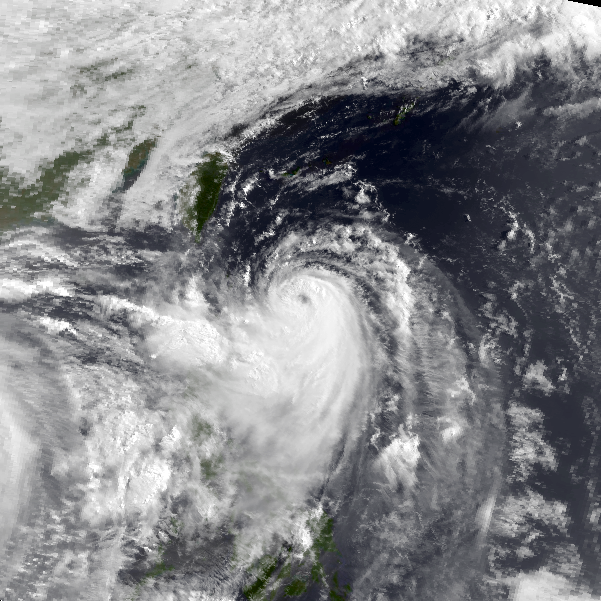
- Bobby near peak intensity on June 26

Meteorological history
- Formed: June 23, 1992
- Extratropical: July 1, 1992
- Dissipated: July 3, 1992

Very strong typhoon
- 10-minute sustained (JMA)
- Highest winds: 165 km/h (105 mph)
- Lowest pressure: 940 hPa (mbar); 27.76 inHg

Category 4-equivalent typhoon
- 1-minute sustained (SSHWS/JTWC)
- Highest winds: 220 km/h (140 mph)
- Lowest pressure: 922 hPa (mbar); 27.23 inHg

Overall effects
- Fatalities: None
- Injuries: 1
- Missing: 2
- Damage: $27.2 million (1992 USD)
- Areas affected: Philippines (primarily Luzon), Japan
- Part of the 1992 Pacific typhoon season

Typhoon Bobbie, known in the Philippines as Typhoon Asiang, was an intense typhoon which affected the Philippines and Japan during June 1992. The third tropical depression, storm, and first typhoon of the 1992 Pacific typhoon season, Bobbie developed from a weak area of convection in the monsoon trough. Intensifying as it underwent a binary interaction with nearby Chuck, on 25 June, Bobbie became a typhoon. Further developing as it tracked northwards, two days later, Bobbie peaked as a very strong typhoon. Soon after, Bobbie began weakening as it recurved northeastward, transitioning into an extratropical cyclone on 1 July. It was at this time when Bobbie made its closest approach to Japan, just southeast of Kyushu. The extratropical remnants of the former typhoon persevered until they dissipated on 3 July.

As the typhoon passed east of northern Luzon, torrential rains associated with Bobble and Chuck caused widespread flooding and mudslides over the northern Philippine Islands. Despite that, Bobbie primarily had a beneficial effect there. In Japan, intense winds and heavy rainfall in the prefectures of Okinawa, Kōchi, Miyazaki, Kagoshima, and Tokyo caused landslides and wave damage. However, due to preparations, no one die. As a weakening Bobbie passed near Kadena Air Base, one trailer was overturned while a woman received head injuries when she was knocked down by Bobbie's strong wind.

== Meteorological history ==
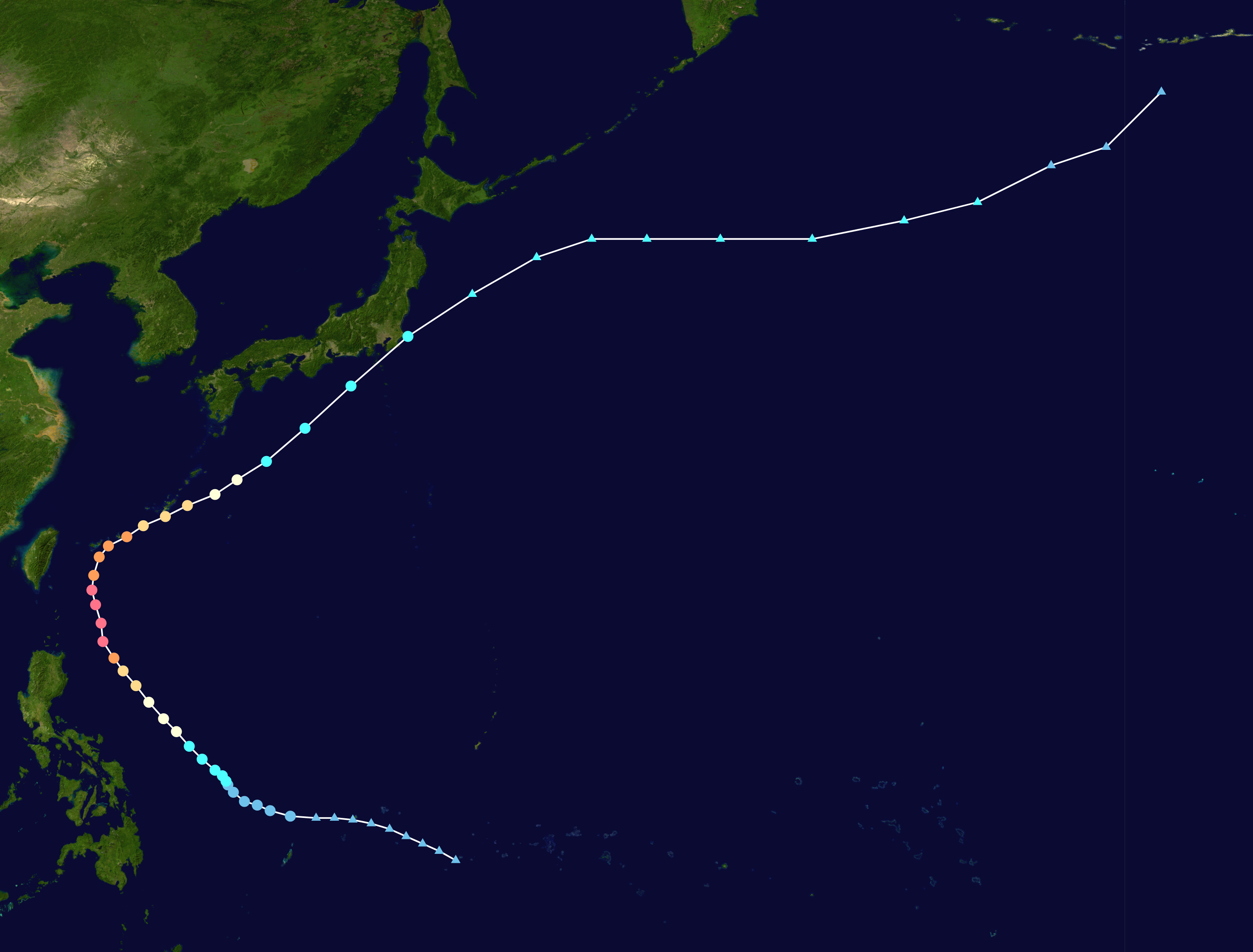
Map plotting the storm's track and intensity, according to the Saffir–Simpson scale Map key Saffir–Simpson scale Tropical depression (≤38 mph, ≤62 km/h) Tropical storm (39–73 mph, 63–118 km/h) Category 1 (74–95 mph, 119–153 km/h) Category 2 (96–110 mph, 154–177 km/h) Category 3 (111–129 mph, 178–208 km/h) Category 4 (130–156 mph, 209–251 km/h) Category 5 (≥157 mph, ≥252 km/h) Unknown Storm type Tropical cyclone Subtropical cyclone Extratropical cyclone, remnant low, tropical disturbance, or monsoon depression

On 20 June, a poorly organized area of convection south of Guam near the central Caroline Islands began developing. Embedded in the monsoon trough, the disturbance's circulation began consolidating, prompting the Joint Typhoon Warning Center (JTWC), an American military organization, to issue a Tropical Cyclone Formation Alert (TCFA) on the disturbance. As a result, on 23 June, the Japan Meteorological Agency (JMA) noted that the disturbance had developed into a tropical depression. Around that time, the JTWC also upgraded the disturbance into a depression, issuing their first warning on Tropical Depression 02W later that day. Intensifying, early on 24 June, both the JTWC and JMA noted Bobbie intensified into a tropical storm, causing the latter agency to name it Bobbie.

Just a few hours later, Bobbie began undergoing a binary interaction with nearby Tropical Storm Chuck, which at the time, just formed off the Philippines. As Bobbie was intensifying, it crossed into the Philippine Area of Responsibility (PAR), prompting the Philippine Atmospheric, Geophysical, and Astronomical Services Administration (PAGSA) to name it Asiang. Early the next day, Bobbie intensified into a severe tropical storm. At that time, the JTWC claimed that Bobbie had intensified into a typhoon, while the JMA noted that Bobbie had actually become a typhoon several hours later. On 18:00 UTC on 26 June, Bobbie peaked with 1-minute sustained winds of 140 mph (220 km/h) as it tracked the western extent of the mid-level subtropical ridge. Several hours later, Bobbie peaked with 10-minute sustained winds of 105 mph (165 km/h).

As Bobbie began recurving east of Taiwan at 12:00 UTC that day, increasing southwesterly winds caused Bobbie to steadily weaken. Passing over Miyako Jima on 28 June and then just southeast of Okinawa on 29 June, Bobbie began undergoing an extratropical transition on at that time. At that time, Bobbie weakened into a severe tropical storm as it left the PAR, causing PAGASA to stop issuing advisories on the storm. As Bobbie transitioned into an extratropical storm, the JTWC issued their final warning on the system the next day, prior to brushing the southern tip of Honshu. The JMA noted that Bobbie had actually become extratropical early the next day, prior to it dissipating on 3 July.

== Preparations ==
Public Storm Warning Signals were issued for portions of Northern Luzon, with PSWS #3 being hoisted for Cagayan and Batanes. In Botolan, a town near Mount Pinatubo, officials warned residents to evacuate to higher ground due to the threat of rain-triggered mudflows. Initially, a warning to evacuate for people living near the Sacobia river was issued, however, soon after, this was upgraded, as thousands of residents living along the banks of the Sacobia, Pasig-Potrero, and Santo Tomas rivers, were on alert to evacuate.

In Okinawa Island, schools were closed and bus service was cancelled prior to Bobbie making landfall there. Elsewhere, in Sasebo, many scheduled hockey and soccer matches were cancelled.

== Impact ==
=== Japan ===
In Japan, Bobbie primarily brought severe rainfall, causing the prefectures of Okinawa, Miyazaki, Kagoshima, Tokyo, Gifu, and Fukui to receive heavy rainfall. Yakushima received 178 mm (7.0 in) in a day, while Uchinoura and portions of Tokyo receiving over 100 mm (3.9 in) of rainfall daily. In Miyazaki Prefecture, Bobbie alongside a frontal zone caused several mudslides. Over 43,000 households lost power in Okinawa as the eye of Bobbie passed south of Okinawa Island on 29 June. In Hachijō-jima, strong waves shattered the windows at an elementary school. Elsewhere, in Miyakojima, 126 telephone lines were out of service while 11,500 households were without power.

A building in Ishigaki island was destroyed due to Bobbie's strong winds, which also caused considerable damage to agriculture, forestry, and fisheries, transportation, and electricity. In there. These caused around ¥2.54 billion ($20 million) in damage. Additionally, in the same island, two homes suffered some damage while there were severe damage to agriculture. As a result, an additional ¥172.61 million ($1.36 million) in damage occurred. In Hachijō-jima and the Northern Izu Archipelago dialects, an estimated ¥44.2 million ($347 thousand) in damage occurred due to damage to farm roads. Elsewhere, ¥695.71 million ($5.49 million) in damage occurred.

=== Elsewhere ===
Bobbie would primarily bring beneficial rainfall to Luzon, as mostly light showers had persevered over the region. However, combined with the effects of nearby Chuck, heavy rainfall would produce mudflows pouring down the Bucao, Balinquero and Maraunot rivers, causing them to rise up 6 ft (1.8 m). The rains loosened many tons of debris which were produced by Pinatubo in a prior eruption, sending them pouring down river channels to impact villages around the volcano. In Santa Rita, a town in Pampanga province, 80 people evacuated after lahar thundered down the Pasig-Potrero river. In Manila, 23 homes were destroyed while 2 people went missing as Bobbie impacted Luzon. Finally, in Sabah, a state in Malaysia, Chuck alongside Bobbie damaged more than 100 homes.
