= Cyclone Esau =

Category 4 South Pacific and Australian region cyclone in 1992

Severe Tropical Cyclone Esau
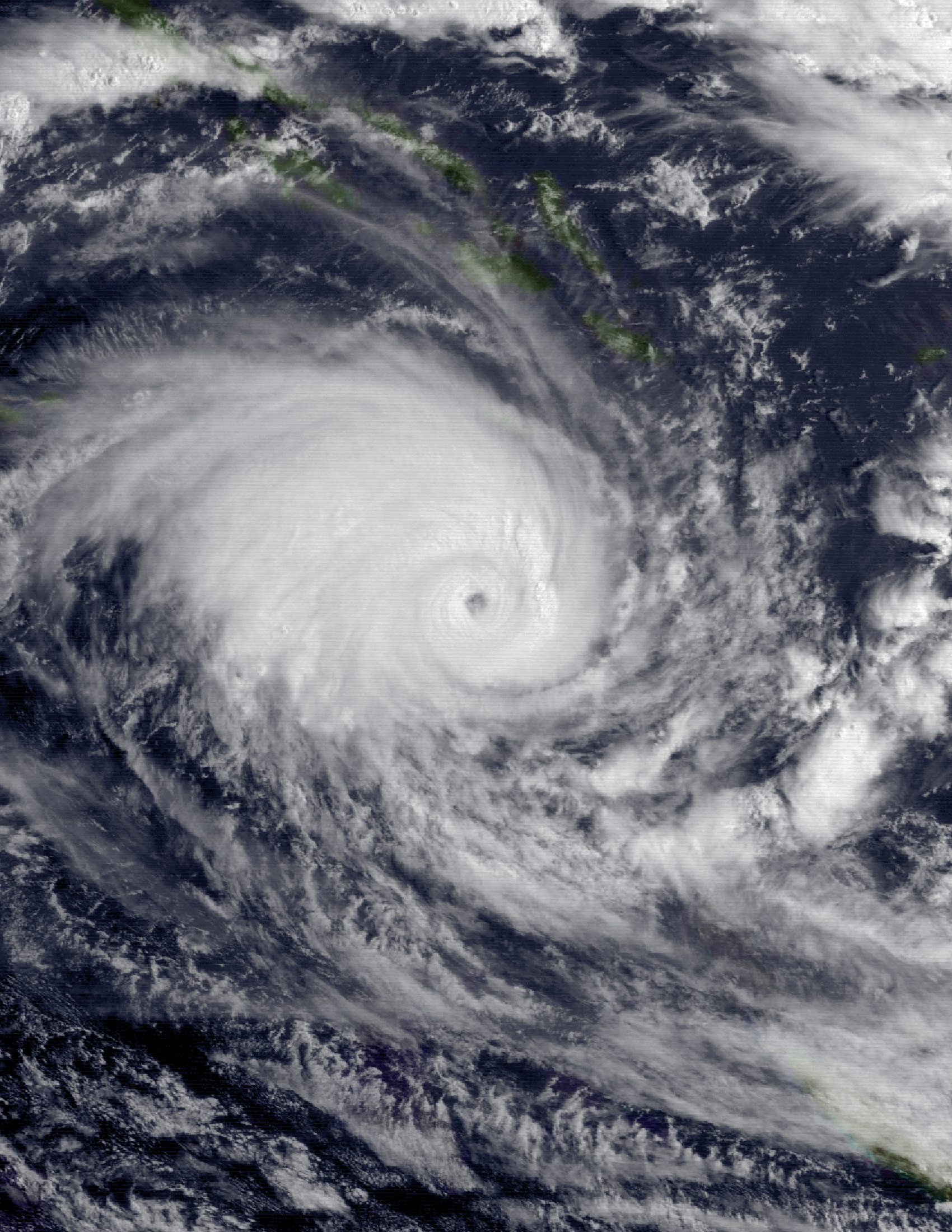
- Cyclone Esau near peak intensity on 28 February

Meteorological history
- Formed: 24 February 1992
- Extratropical: 5 March 1992
- Dissipated: 9 March 1992

Category 4 severe tropical cyclone
- 10-minute sustained (FMS)
- Highest winds: 195 km/h (120 mph)
- Lowest pressure: 925 hPa (mbar); 27.32 inHg

Category 4-equivalent tropical cyclone
- 1-minute sustained (SSHWS/JTWC)
- Highest winds: 240 km/h (150 mph)
- Lowest pressure: 910 hPa (mbar); 26.87 inHg

Overall effects
- Fatalities: 1 confirmed
- Areas affected: Solomon Islands, Vanuatu, New Caledonia, New Zealand
- IBTrACS
- Part of the 1991–92 South Pacific and Australian region cyclone seasons

Severe Tropical Cyclone Esau was the strongest tropical cyclone to affect New Caledonia on record. A shallow tropical depression developed within the monsoon trough during 24 February 1992, about 370 km (230 mi) to the northeast of Port Vila, Vanuatu. Over the next day, the system gradually developed further as it moved towards the south-west under the influence of a northerly steering flow, before it passed over Pentecost Island in northern Vanuatu during 25 February. After passing over Pentecost the system continued to move towards the southwest and passed near the island of Malakula before the depression turned northwards and executed a small clockwise loop as it passed over the island of Espiritu Santo. The system was subsequently named Esau during 26 February, after it had developed into a tropical cyclone. Over the next couple of days, the system moved south-westwards towards Australia and away from the islands of Vanuatu. Esau subsequently executed a second clockwise loop during 28 February, before it peaked as a Category 4 tropical cyclone on both the Australian tropical cyclone intensity scale and the Saffir-Simpson hurricane wind scale. After it had peaked the system moved south-eastwards and threatened Southern Vanuatu, before turning southwards and threatening the French overseas territory of New Caledonia. Esau made landfall on the French territory during 4 March, as a category 3 severe tropical cyclone before degenerating into an extratropical cyclone during 5 March. The systems remnants made landfall on New Zealand's North Island during 8 March, before they were last noted during the next day over the South Pacific Ocean.

Esau caused minimal damage and one death, as it affected the Solomon Islands, Vanuatu, New Caledonia and New Zealand. The system affected the northern Vanuatu Islands between 25–27 February and 2–3 March, with heavy rain and strong winds of up to 80 km/h (50 mph) but caused no damage. Esau produced gale-force winds on the Solomon Islands of Rennell and Bellona and knocked down several banana, coconut and pawpaw trees. The system also destroyed several houses and severely flooded various taro gardens and food crops. Esau produced hurricane-force winds on New Caledonia, while extensive flooding was reported in the territory. Several roads were blocked as the system blew down trees and damaged buildings, while power and communications were also knocked out over the island. One person drowned as she tried to cross a river near Hienghene, while a young child went missing on the island of Lifou but was later found safe by local residents. The extra-tropical remnants of Esau made landfall on New Zealand's North Island during 8 March, where hail and a tornado were reported to have occurred. The name Esau was subsequently retired from the list of tropical cyclone names for the South Pacific basin.

== Meteorological history ==
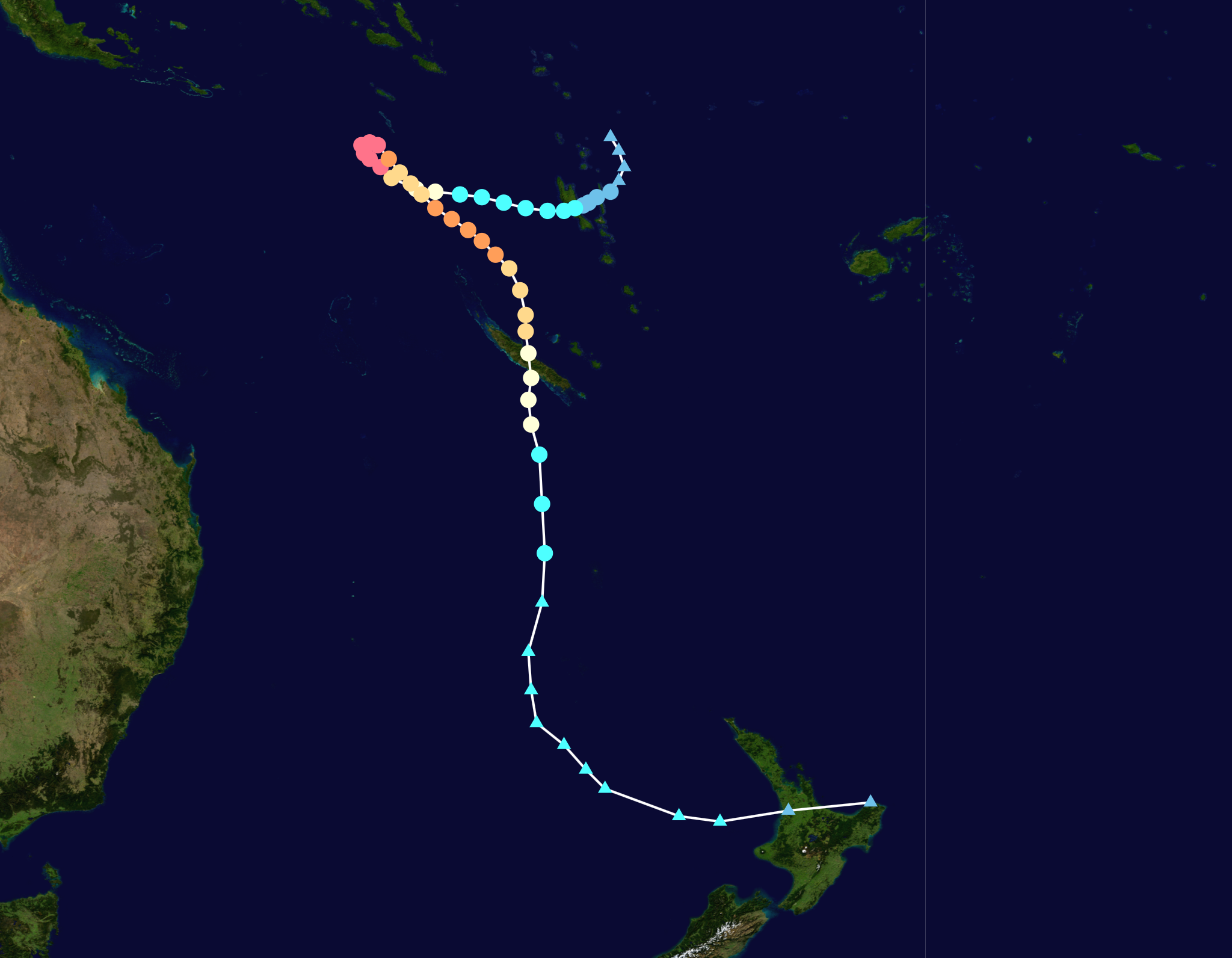
Map plotting the storm's track and intensity, according to the Saffir–Simpson scale Map key Saffir–Simpson scale Tropical depression (≤38 mph, ≤62 km/h) Tropical storm (39–73 mph, 63–118 km/h) Category 1 (74–95 mph, 119–153 km/h) Category 2 (96–110 mph, 154–177 km/h) Category 3 (111–129 mph, 178–208 km/h) Category 4 (130–156 mph, 209–251 km/h) Category 5 (≥157 mph, ≥252 km/h) Unknown Storm type Tropical cyclone Subtropical cyclone Extratropical cyclone, remnant low, tropical disturbance, or monsoon depression

Towards the end of February 1992, a monsoon trough of low pressure was located over the South Pacific Ocean, between northern Australia and the Samoan Islands. A shallow tropical depression subsequently developed within this monsoon trough during 24 February, about 370 km (230 mi) to the northeast of Port Vila, Vanuatu. Over the next day the system gradually developed further as it moved towards the south-west under the influence of a northerly steering flow, before it passed over Pentecost Island in northern Vanuatu during 25 February. After passing over Pentecost the system continued to move towards the southwest and passed near the island of Malampa, before the depression turned northwards and executed a small clockwise loop as it passed over the island of Espiritu Santo. Early on 26 February, the United States Joint Typhoon Warning Center started to issue advisories on the system and designated it as Tropical Cyclone 21P, while it was located to the east of Espiritu Santo. Later that day the Fiji Meteorological Service (FMS) reported that the system had developed into a Category 1 tropical cyclone on the Australian tropical cyclone intensity scale and named it Esau. Throughout that day as Esau intensified further, it moved south-westwards and away from the islands of Vanuatu. Esau subsequently accelerated westwards to the north of an intense subtropical ridge of high pressure and gradually intensified further as it moved into an area of decreasing vertical windshear.

During 28 February, the system became a category 3 severe tropical cyclone, while it was located about 550 km (340 mi) to the west of Espiritu Santo. During that day the system intensified further before it started executing a second clockwise loop as the subtropical ridge weakened and placed the system in an area of weak steering. The FMS subsequently reported that the system had peaked as a category 4 severe tropical cyclone with 10-minute sustained wind speeds of 195 km/h (120 mph). The system subsequently moved into the Australian region and brought gale-force winds to the Solomon Islands during 29 February. The JTWC also reported that Esau had peaked with 1-minute sustained wind speeds of 240 km/h (150 mph), which made it a category 4 hurricane on the Saffir-Simpson hurricane wind scale. Over the next few days the system moved south-eastwards and back into the South Pacific basin, under the influence of a northwest steering flow and threatened the southern islands of Vanuatu. The system subsequently came to within 450 km (280 mi) of southern Vanuatu before turning southwards and threatening the French overseas territory of New Caledonia. The system made landfall near Ponerihouen in the French territory of New Caledonia on 4 March, as a category 3 severe tropical cyclone. As a result of passing over the mountainous island nation and increasing vertical wind shear, the system continued to weaken and transitioned into an extra tropical cyclone over the cooler waters of the Tasman Sea. The extra tropical remnants of Cyclone Esau subsequently made landfall on New Zealand's North Island in the Taranaki and Hawkes Bay area during 8 March, before they were last noted during the next day over the South Pacific Ocean.

== Preparations and impact ==
Severe Tropical Cyclone Esau caused minimal damage as it affected the Solomon Islands, Vanuatu, New Caledonia and New Zealand, before the name was retired from the Lists of tropical cyclone names for the region by the World Meteorological Organization. Esau first affected the northern Vanuatu Islands between 25–27 February, with heavy rain and strong winds of up to 80 km/h (50 mph). The system subsequently affected the southern islands of Vanuatu between 2–3 March, when it was considered to be as powerful and potentially damaging as Cyclone Uma. However, there was no damage or any gale-force winds reported in Vanuatu, after the system had become the fourth tropical cyclone to affect the island nation during the 1991–92 season. The system subsequently became the fourth tropical cyclone to affect the Solomon Islands, during the 1991–92 season between 27 February – 4 March. At its closest point of approach to the island nation between 28–29 February, Esau produced gale-force winds on the islands of Bellona and Rennell and knocked down several banana, coconut and pawpaw trees. The system also destroyed several houses and severely flooded various taro gardens and food crops. It was subsequently estimated that relief workers, would need to provide aid for around 5000 people on the two islands.

After affecting both Vanuatu and the Solomon Islands, Esau became the strongest tropical cyclone to affect New Caledonia on record as it made landfall on the northern region of the island nation with hurricane-force winds between 4–5 March. Ahead of the system making landfall, the maximum alert was introduced for most of the island nation, before it was extended out to cover the whole territory. Within the French territory wind gusts of 158 km/h (98 mph) were recorded in Népoui and Cap N'Dua, while a wind gust of 144 km/h (89 mph) was recorded in Poindimié. Extensive flooding was reported in the territory while rainfall totals of 528 mm (20.8 in), 395 mm (15.6 in) and 354 mm (13.9 in) were recorded in Kopéto, Tiendanite and Tiwaka. Several roads were blocked as the system blew down trees and damaged buildings, while power and communications were also knocked out over the island. One person drowned as she tried to cross a river near Hienghene, while a young child went missing on the island of Lifou but was later found safe by local residents. Severe Tropical Cyclone Fran subsequently affected the northern part of the French territory between 10–11 March. On 8 March, the extratropical remnants of Esau made landfall on New Zealand's North Island in the Taranaki and Hawkes Bay area.

== See also ==
- Cyclone Gavin
- Cyclone Yali
- Cyclone Drena
