= Pango, Vanuatu =

Pango TIVELEA Epang - Eurakot
- Village/Pre urban Community
- Location in Vanuatu
- Coordinates: 17°47′S 168°17′E
- Country: Vanuatu
- Province: Shefa Province
- Island: Efate

Government
  - MASEI - MAN: Masei - Laru"

Population (2009)
  - Total: 2,485
- Time zone: UTC+11 (VUT)

Pango is a community located on the southern coast of Efate, Vanuatu. It is considered peri-urban and is located seven kilometers away from Port Vila, the capital of Vanuatu.

The name Pango was given by early Samoan missionaries who arrived in the 1840s.

== History ==
Missionary activity in Pango started in May of 1845 with the arrival of the London Missionary Society ship John Williams. By 1853, the majority of the population of the village had been converted to Christianity, far earlier than the rest of the island.

The capital city of Port Vila is on land claimed by Pango and the nearby villages of Erakor and Ifira as their kastom land. At independence, all land owned or controlled by foreign entities was legally returned to the control of the indigenous peoples of Vanuatu, but in practice this was not done in urban areas. Cities such as Port Vila were established and grew following European colonisation, and the official return of this land to indigenous claimants would cause further problems. Following protests by villagers, these three villages were granted compensation for the lost land in 1992, with Pango receiving VT 55 million.

== Population ==
Pango village has a population of not more than 208 since 1867 which later increased to 2,000 as of 2011. It has 1600 Registered Voters.

The traditional governance is governed by the paramount jif related to as the Marik Naot(chief) "Maseiman (Star bird)", The chiefs council are collectively made of 8 tribal chiefs(Masei-Laru) representing 8 tribes(8 Naflak);

- Kram
- Noai
- Natongrau
- Naniu
- Mgal
- Naptam
- Mleo
- Wit
