= Brianna =

Brianna, Breanna, Briana and Bryanna are feminine given names. Brianna is a feminine English language form of the masculine Irish language name Brian as "Briana" is the original spelling. The name is a relatively modern one and was occasionally used in England from about the 16th century and on; Briana is the name of a character in Edmund Spenser's The Faerie Queene. In recent years, the name has become increasingly popular, especially in the United States.

Variant spellings of Brianna include Brianne and Breanne (a variant form of Breanna).

== People with the given name ==
=== Breanna ===
- Breanna Clark (born 1994), American Paralympic relay runner
- Breanna Conrad (born 1989), American television personality
- Breanna Hargrave (born 1982), Australian track cyclist
- Breanna Koenen (born 1994), Australian rules footballer
- Breanna Labadan (born 2006), Filipina gymnast
- Breanna Leslie (born 1991), American pentathlete, heptathlete, and hurdler
- Breanna Myles (born 2003), American beauty pageant titleholder
- Breanna Sinclairé (born 1991), American singer
- Breanna Stewart (born 1994), American basketball player
- Breanna Yde (born 2003), American actress

=== Briana ===
- Briana Banks (born 1978), German-American pornographic actress and model
- Briana Binch (born 1987), Australian cricketer
- Briana Blasko, American photographer and artist
- Briana Buckmaster (born 1982), Canadian actress and singer
- Briana Corrigan (born 1965), Northern Irish singer
- Briana Cuoco (born 1988), American actress, singer, and choreographer
- Briana De Souza (born 1991), Canadian soccer player
- Briana Evigan (born 1986), American actress and dancer
- Briana Gilbreath-Butler (born 1990), American basketball player
- Briana Nicole Henry (born 1992), American actress
- Briana King (born 1993), American skateboarder, community organizer, model, and actress
- Briana Lane (born 1985), American actress and musician
- Briana Marela, American musician
- Briana Mastel (born 1994), American ice hockey player
- Briana Middleton, American actress, singer, and songwriter
- Briana Provancha (born 1989), American sailor
- Briana Scott (born 1969), American singer-songwriter
- Briana Scurry (born 1971), American soccer player
- Briana Sewell (born 1990), American politician
- Briana Shepherd (born c. 1987), Australian journalist, reporter, and news presenter
- Briana Szabó (born 2005), Romanian tennis player
- Briana Waters, American convicted arsonist
- Briana Williams (born 2002), American-Jamaican sprinter
- Briana Zamora (born 1973/1974), American attorney and judge

=== Brianna ===
- Brianna Beahan (born 1991), Australian hurdler
- Brianna Beamish (born 1993), Canadian volleyball player
- Brianna Bellido (born 1993), American-Peruvian footballer
- Brianna Brown (born 1979), American actress
- Brianna Buentello (born 1989), American politician
- Brianna Butler (born 1994), American basketball player
- Brianna Clark (born 1995), Australian rugby league footballer
- Brianna Coop (born 1998), Australian Paralympic track and field athlete
- Brie Bella (born 1983), ring name of Brianna Monique Danielson
- Brianna Davey (born 1995), Australian rules footballer
- Brianna Decker (born 1991), American ice hockey player
- Brianna Denison (1988–2008), American college student and murder victim
- Brianna Felnagle (born 1986), American middle-distance runner
- Brianna Fortino (born 1993), American mixed martial artist
- Brianna Fruean (born 1998), New Zealand activist and environmental advocate
- Brianna Ghey (2006–2023), English murder victim
- Brianna Glenn (born 1980), American long jumper
- Brianna Green (born 1996), Australian rules footballer
- Brianna Hennessy (born 1984), Canadian paracanoeist
- Brianna Henries (born 1991), American politician and esthetician
- Brianna Hildebrand (born 1996), American actress
- Brianna Holder (born 2001), Barbadian netball player
- Brianna Kahane (born 2002), American violinist
- Brianna Keilar (born 1980), American journalist
- Brianna Kiesel (born 1993), American basketball player
- Brianna Knickerbocker, American voice actor
- Brianna Kupfer (1997–2022), American university student and murder victim
- Brianna Lance (born 1982), American fashion designer
- Brianna LaPaglia (born 1999), American influencer and podcaster
- Brianna Lyston (born 2004), Jamaican sprinter
- Brianna Maitland (born 1986), disappeared from Vermont in 2004
- Brianna Miller (born 1991), Canadian rugby union player
- Brianna Moyes (born 1991), Australian rules footballer
- Brianna Nelson (born 1992), Canadian Paralympic swimmer
- Brianna Perry (born 1992), American rapper and actress, known professionally as Lil' Brianna
- Brianna Pinto (born 2000), American soccer player
- Brianna Lea Pruett (1983–2015), American singer-songwriter, musician, painter, poet, and filmmaker
- Brianna Rollins-McNeal (born 1991), American hurdler
- Brianna Salinaro (born 1998), American Paralympic taekwondo practitioner
- Brianna Schnorrbusch (born 2006), American snowboarder
- Brianna Ste-Marie (born 1996), Canadian grappler and Brazilian jiu-jitsu athlete
- Brianna Stewart, possibly an alias of Treva Throneberry (born 1969), American imposter
- Brianna Stubbs (born 1991), British rower and research scientist
- Brianna Taylor (born 1987), American television personality, singer, and songwriter
- Brianna Thomas, American jazz singer, vocalist, composer, songwriter, band leader, and percussionist
- Brianna Throssell (born 1996), Australian swimmer
- Brianna Titone, American politician and scientist
- Brianna Turner (born 1996), American basketball player
- Brianna Visalli (born 1995), British-American soccer player
- Brianna Walle (born 1984), American racing cyclist
- Brianna Westbrook (born 1984), American transgender rights activist and politician
- Brianna Westrup (born 1997), American soccer player
- Brianna Wu (born 1977), American video game developer and activist

=== Bryanna ===
- Bryanna McCarthy (born 1991), Canadian soccer player
- Bryanna Nasck, Brazilian influencer and streamer

== See also ==
- Bryna (given name)
- Sabrina (given name)
- Breonna Taylor
