= O Último Ancestral =

Brazilian science fiction book

- Author: Ale Santos
- Publication date: 2021
- ISBN: 9786555112412

O Último Ancestral (English: The Last Ancestor) is a Brazilian afrofuturist fiction novel, written by Ale Santos. The book was a finalist for the 2022 Jabuti Award in the Entertainment Novel category and the CCXP Awards of the same year.

It features cover art by one of Brazil's most renowned artists, Rafael Albuquerque, in collaboration with Douglas Lopes.

The book has a spinoff titled A Malta Indomável (English: Indomitable Malta) released by HarperCollins in 2023, and will be adapted into a TV series and an RPG.

== Plot ==
The novel is narrated in the third person, while the book's universe takes place in a dystopian futuristic reality in the district of Nagast, where advanced technology, dominated by the technocratic and segregationist dictatorship of the Cybernergized (cyborgs representing the ruling class in the story), mixes with African-based religions, the anti-racist struggle, and the poor and peripheral reality of the residents of the Obambo favela.

The protagonist of the story, Eliah, a professional car thief, seeks to fight alongside his younger sister and hacker Hanna against the Cybernergized (Cygens) and other evil beings who are trying to destroy Obambo and wipe out Eliah and his friends. The protagonist discovers that he is the last ancestor of the people who founded Nagast, and he is the only one capable of fighting the forces intent on destroying all remnants of the descendants and their worship of African origins.

The Obambo community is led by Zero, Eliah's boss and head of the car-theft crew, who later hands Eliah over to the community's enemies in a deal. Captured, the protagonist is taken to a kind of sanatorium responsible for punishing those who still have ties to African-origin cults. However, his sister Hanna frees a cyber-capoeirista named Bento from the cyber world and sends him to be his brother's squire. Eliah manages to escape captivity, gradually gaining mystical powers from his ancestry, and discovers that there are very powerful beings who want to exterminate him.

== Characters ==
Eliah - the protagonist of the story and a professional car thief. He discovers he has powers passed down from his ancestors, and is considered the Last Ancestor of Nagast. The name Eliah is inspired by Haile Selassie (Halie is the reverse of Eliah), an important figure in the Rastafarian movement.

Hanna - Eliah's younger sister, a video game addict and self-taught hacker. She uses her knowledge of artificial intelligence and computer science to help her brother in his plans to save the people of Obambo.

Zero - the head of the mechanics and one of the leaders of Obambo's organized crime. He has a burning desire to get revenge against the oppressive and racist system of Nagast's authorities.

Moss - one of the founders of Nagast and a priestess of the people. She fell into a long sleep after defeating the Artificial Intelligence that ruled the district.

Bento - a cyber-capoeirista who fell asleep in the virtual network and was later reactivated by Hanna. His name is inspired by Benedito Meia-Légua, a quilombola leader from Espírito Santo.

Selci - a former resident of Obambo and a music star. She now performs in the elite center of Nagast, but with the intention of gathering people interested in bringing down the district's economic system.

Misty - a hacker allied with Zero on matters related to artificial intelligence and computer science, she also supports Eliah's group during their attempt to protect the people of Obambo.

== Works inspired by the book ==
In addition to the spinoff novel released in 2023 titled A Malta Indomável, the adaptation of O Último Ancestral for television was approved in July 2022. The film production company RT Features, owned by Brazilian Rodrigo Teixeira acquired the rights to O Último Ancestral for an audiovisual adaptation. As of 2023, the show was in the stage of creating script proposal.

A tabletop RPG game called "O Último Ancestral RPG" will be released, based on the Kalymba RPG rules. The game's development is being done under Alê's supervision in partnership with the Paraná-based company Craftando.

== Inspiration ==
Ale Santos draws inspiration from classic science fiction references like Isaac Asimov, J. R. R. Tolkien and H. G. Wells, mixed with references to Black culture. The name of the district in the story, Nagast, is the title of a book that tells the origin of the Solomonic dynasty of Ethiopian emperors.The name Obambo, on the other hand, comes from a mystical figure common to Central African. Other mythologies present in Brazil also inform the work, such as the congado, the cavalhada, and the Feast of Saint Benedict.

The plot also incorporates elements inspired by Afro-Indigenous thought: part of the society in the book resists the dictatorship and uses elements of nature and music to communicate. The book also features traces of candomblé and umbanda, the worship of Saint George, and hip hop.
