= 1991–92 South-West Indian Ocean cyclone season =

Cyclone season in the Southwest Indian Ocean

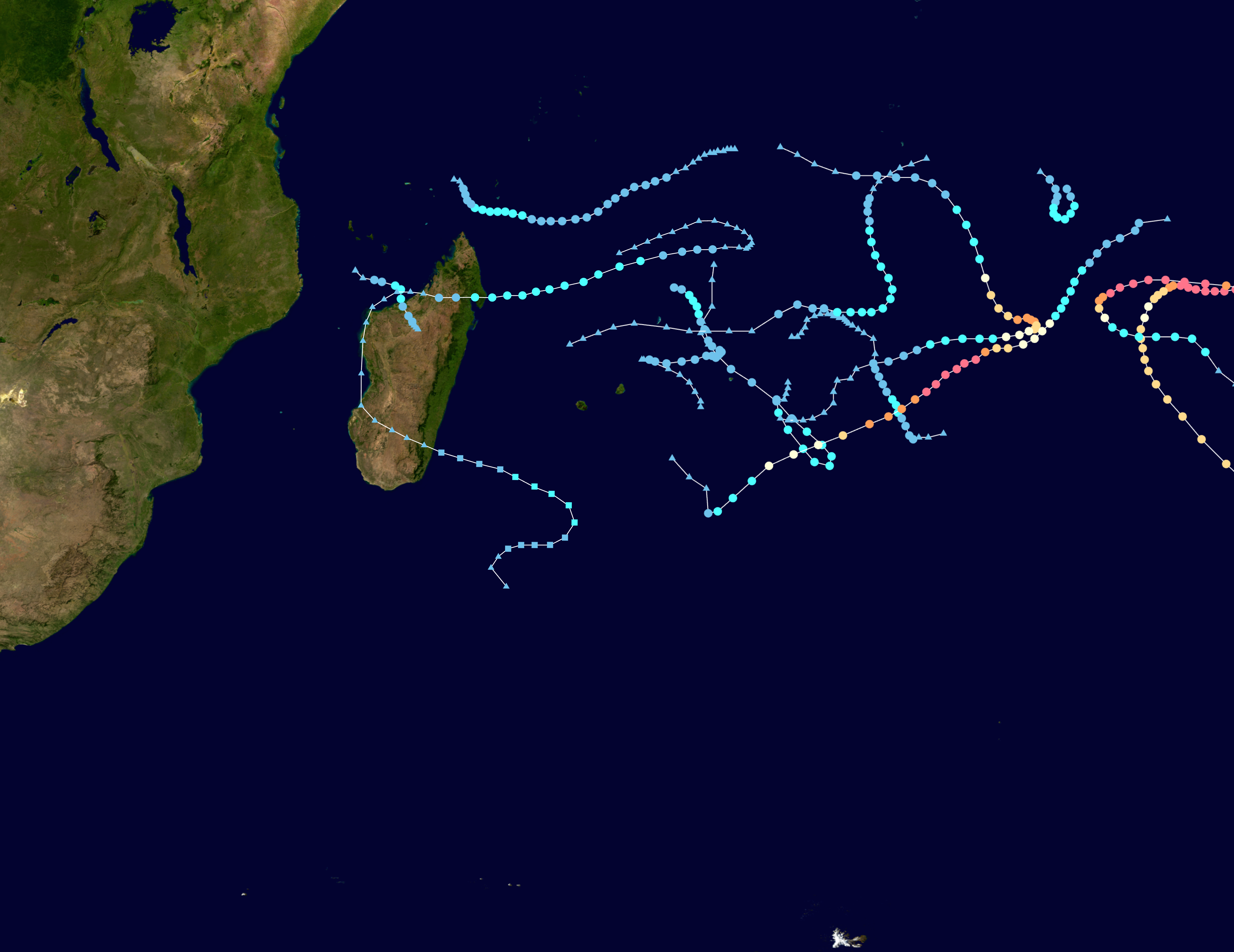
- Season summary map

Seasonal boundaries
- First system formed: September 11, 1991
- Last system dissipated: April 19, 1992

Strongest storm
- Name: Harriet-Heather
  - Maximum winds: 165 km/h (105 mph) (10-minute sustained)
  - Lowest pressure: 930 hPa (mbar)

Seasonal statistics
- Total depressions: 14
- Total storms: 11
- Tropical cyclones: 3
- Intense tropical cyclones: 1
- Total fatalities: 2
- Total damage: Unknown

Related articles
- 1991–92 Australian region cyclone season; 1991–92 South Pacific cyclone season

The 1991–92 South-West Indian Ocean cyclone season was an average cyclone season in which most storms remained over open waters. At the time, the season's official bounds lasted from November 15, 1991, to April 30, 1992, although this season began early when three tropical depressions formed before the official start. The second, designated Tropical Depression A2 by the Météo-France office (MFR) on Réunion, passed north of Madagascar on October 16 before weakening.

The first named storm was Severe Tropical Storm Alexandra, which developed on December 18 from the monsoon trough; many other storms during the year originated in this manner. Tropical Storm Bryna was the only tropical storm of the season to make landfall, having struck northeastern Madagascar on January 2. The basin was most active in February, when five named storms developed, including Tropical Depression Elizabetha which struck western Madagascar. In early March, Cyclone Harriet entered the basin from the Australian region and was renamed Heather. It intensified to peak winds of 165 km/h (105 mph), making Heather the strongest storm of the season. In April, another cyclone – Jane – crossed from the Australian region and was renamed Irna, which reentered the Australian region on April 19 to end tropical activity within the basin.

== Season summary ==
In general, sea surface temperatures were warmest near the equator in the northeast portion of the basin, and in the Mozambique Channel between Mozambique and Madagascar. During the season, the Météo-France office (MFR) on Réunion island issued warnings in tropical cyclones within the basin. The agency estimated intensity through the Dvorak technique, and warned on tropical cyclones in the region from the coast of Africa to 80° E, south of the equator. The Joint Typhoon Warning Center (JTWC), which is a joint United States Navy – United States Air Force task force, also issued tropical cyclone warnings for the southwestern Indian Ocean.

During the season, there was an El Niño event that caused tropical cyclogenesis in the southern hemisphere to shift more to the east. In addition, the monsoon trough, which helped spawn most of the storms in the season, was weaker than normal in the Indian Ocean. The number of tropical depressions forming was above average, although there were fewer days than normal with tropical cyclone activity.

== Systems ==
=== Tropical Storm 01S ===
- Tropical storm (SSHWS)
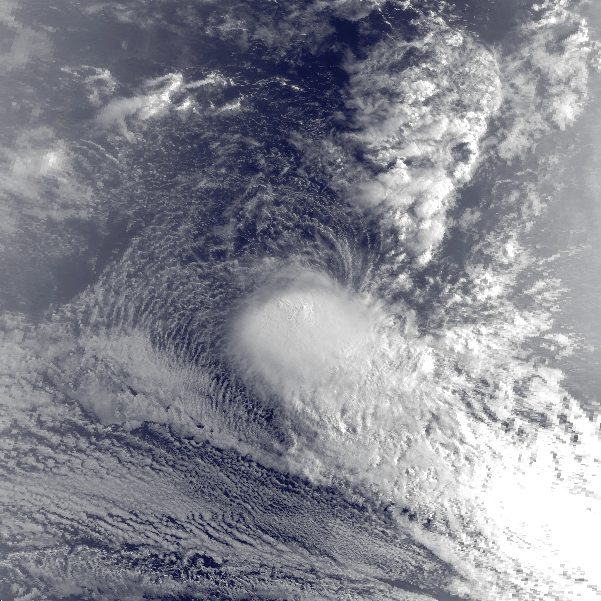
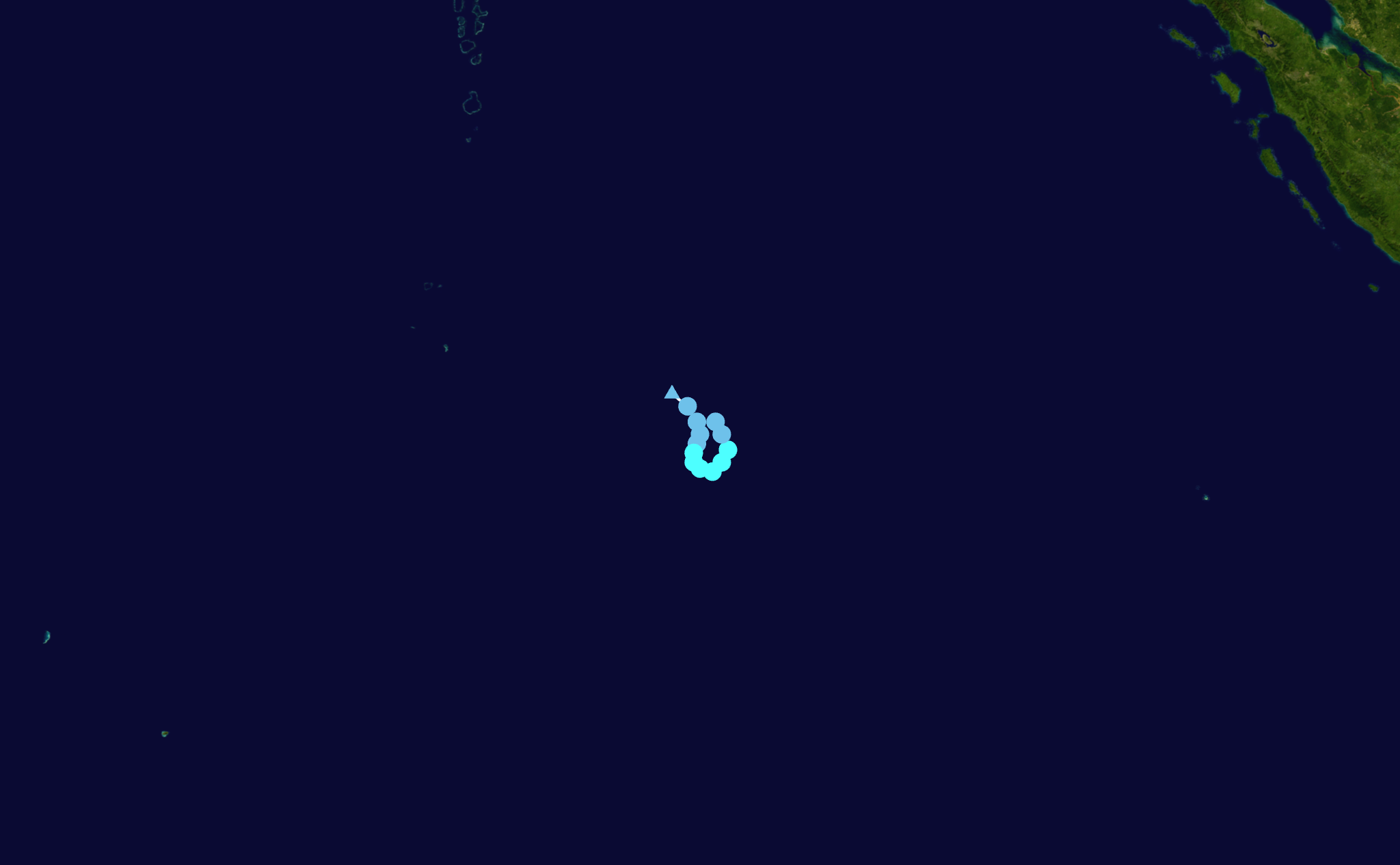
- Duration: September 10 – September 13
- Peak intensity: 85 km/h (50 mph) (1-min);

On September 10, 1991, the JTWC began monitoring a tropical depression in the northeastern portion of the basin. The system moved southeastward, and according to the agency intensified into an 85 km/h (50 mph 1‑minute sustained) tropical storm on September 12. By the next day, the storm dissipated after turning back to the north.

=== Tropical Depression A2 ===
- Tropical depression (MFR)
- Tropical storm (SSHWS)
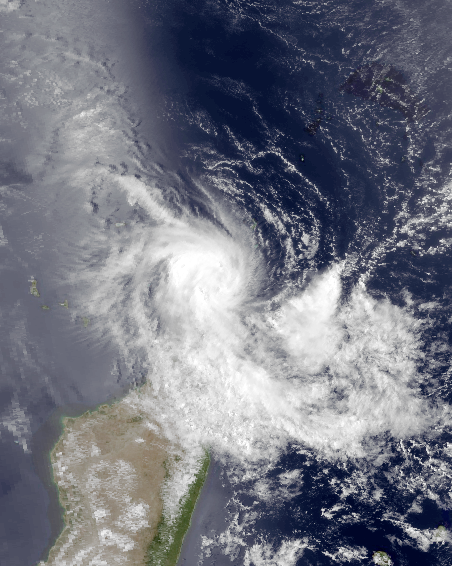
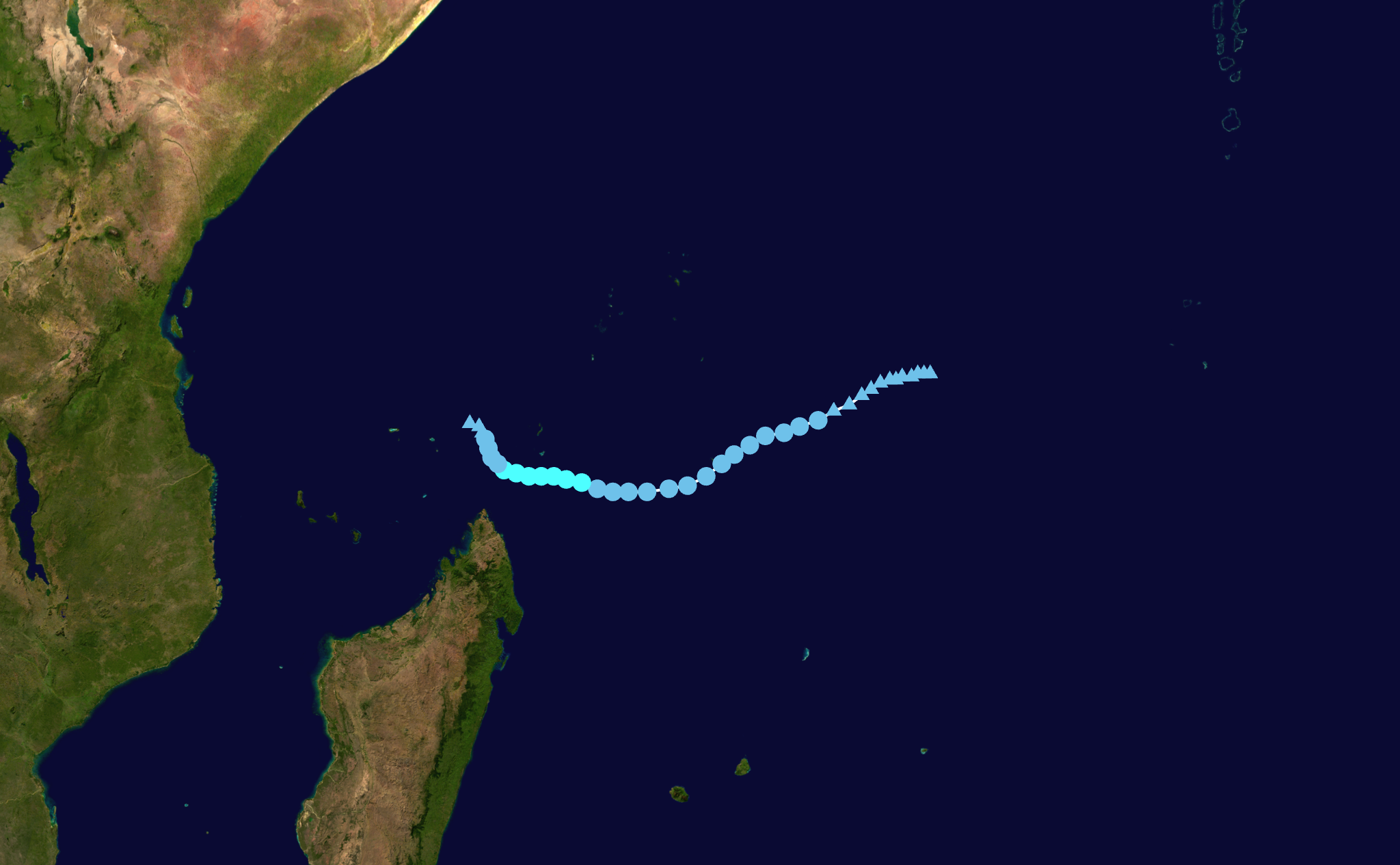
- Duration: October 14 – October 22
- Peak intensity: 50 km/h (30 mph) (10-min); 997 hPa (mbar)

About a month after the previous storm dissipated, the JTWC classified another tropical depression on October 11 about 960 km (600 mi) east-southeast of Seychelles. The system tracked west-southwestward, and the MFR also began issuing warnings on it as Tropical Depression A2 on October 14. Two days later, the JTWC briefly upgraded the depression to a tropical storm, although MFR only estimated peak 10‑minute winds of 50 km/h (30 mph). By that time, the storm had turned to the west, passing north of the northern tip of Madagascar. After turning to the west-northwest, the depression dissipated on October 22.

=== Moderate Tropical Storm A4 ===
- Moderate tropical storm (MFR)
- Tropical storm (SSHWS)
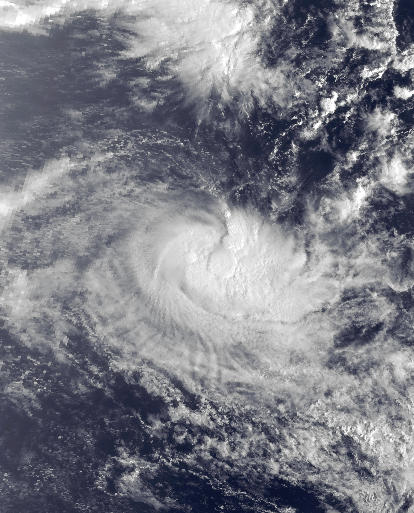
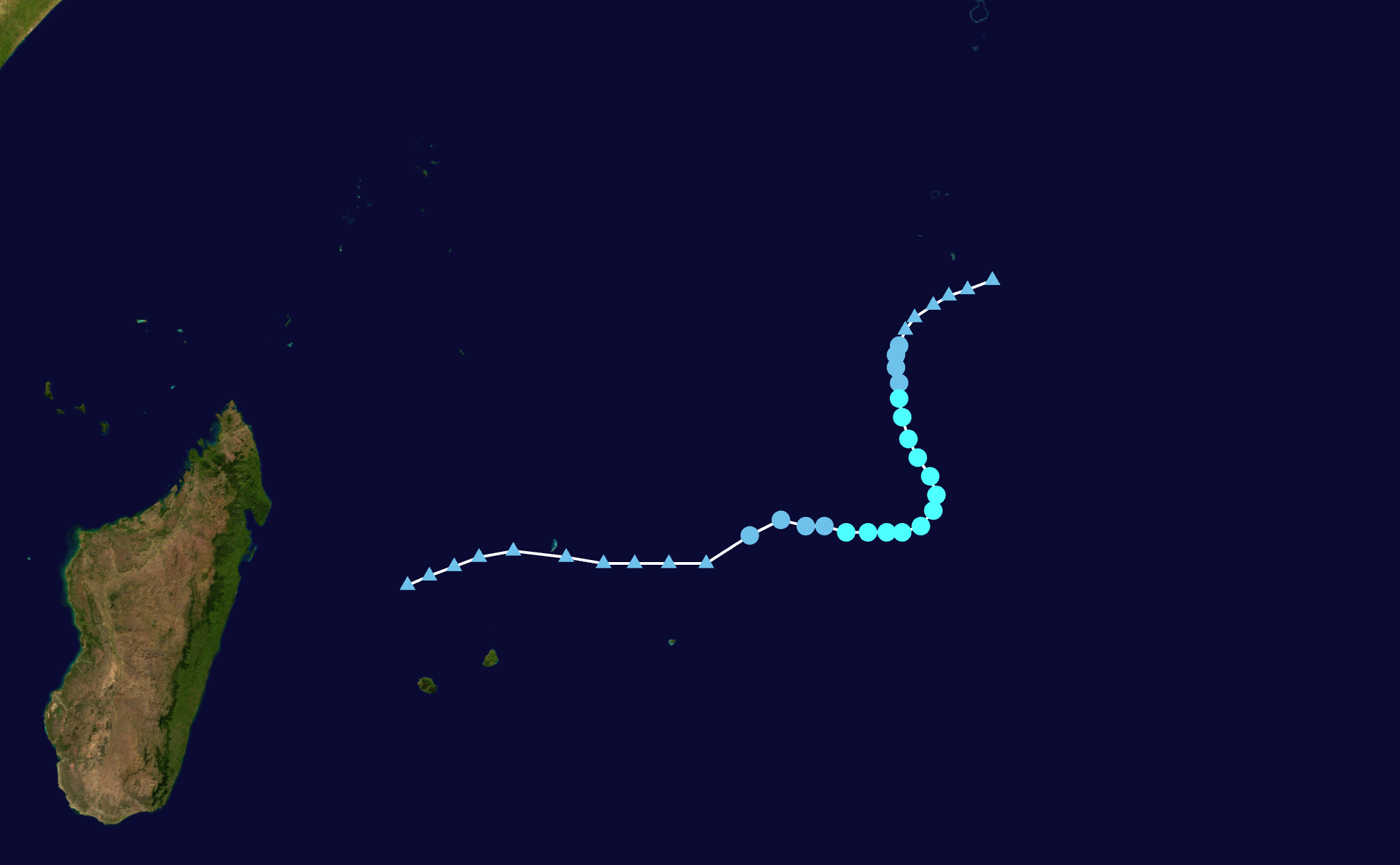
- Duration: November 21 – November 29
- Peak intensity: 70 km/h (45 mph) (10-min); 991 hPa (mbar)

On November 20, the JTWC began tracking Tropical Cyclone 04S a short distance southeast of Diego Garcia. The next day, MFR also initiated advisories on it, classifying the system as Tropical Depression A4. After moving southwestward initially, the storm curved south-southeastward and intensified. The JTWC estimated peak 1‑minute winds of 85 mph (50 mph), and the MFR estimated 10‑minute winds of 65 km/h (40 mph), indicating that it could have been named. While near peak intensity, the storm was affected by wind shear that displaced the circulation center along the north edge of the convection. The storm turned to the west, passing just south of St. Brandon before dissipating on November 29.

=== Severe Tropical Storm Alexandra ===
- Severe tropical storm (MFR)
- Category 3 tropical cyclone (SSHWS)
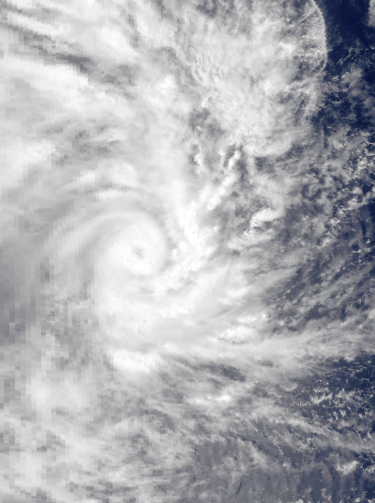
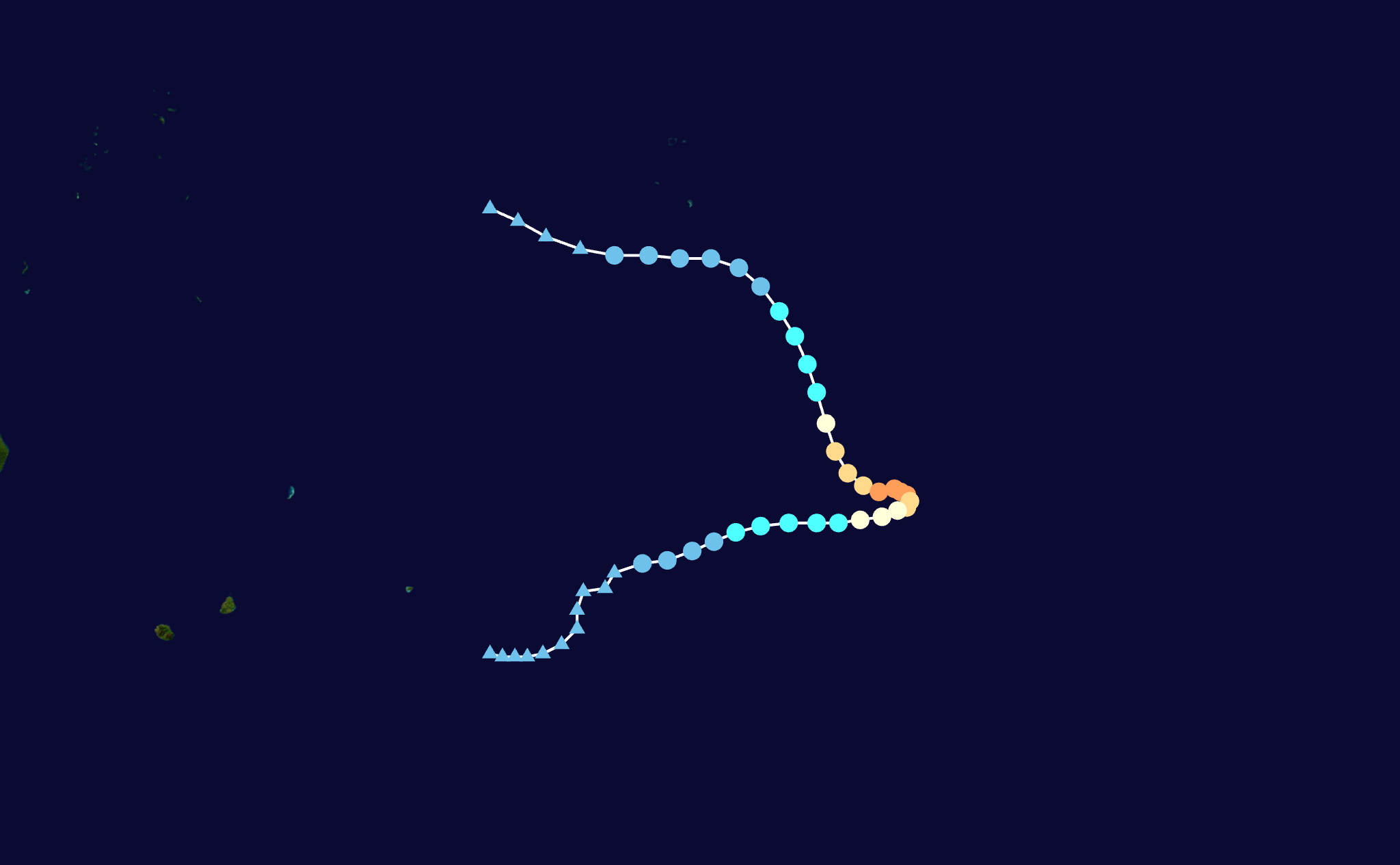
- Duration: December 18 – December 29
- Peak intensity: 105 km/h (65 mph) (10-min); 972 hPa (mbar)

On December 17, the JTWC began monitoring a tropical depression about 700 km (440 mi) west of Diego Garcia in association with the Intertropical Convergence Zone (ITCZ), designating it as Tropical Cyclone 09S. The next day, the MFR also began classifying the system. The nascent depression moved generally to the southeast, and later more to the south-southeast, ahead of an approaching upper-level trough. On December 20, the depression intensified into Tropical Storm Alexandra, and that day developed an ill-defined eye, as well as good inflow. The JTWC upgraded Alexandra to the equivalent of a minimal hurricane – with 1-minute sustained winds of at least 120 km/h (75 mph) on December 21, but MFR only estimated peak 10‑minute winds of 105 km/h (65 mph). Although the MFR estimated the storm subsequently weakened, the JTWC assessed that Alexandra continued to intensity to a peak 1‑minute intensity of 195 km/h (120 mph) on December 22. Around that time, the cyclone had slowed and turned to the east. Increased shear caused gradual weakening, and the strengthening of the subtropical ridge turned Alexandra to the southwest. The JTWC discontinued advisories on December 26, and Alexandra dissipated three days later well to the east-northeast of Mauritius, or about 1,600 km (1,000 mi) south of where it first formed.

=== Moderate Tropical Storm Bryna ===
- Moderate tropical storm (MFR)
- Tropical storm (SSHWS)
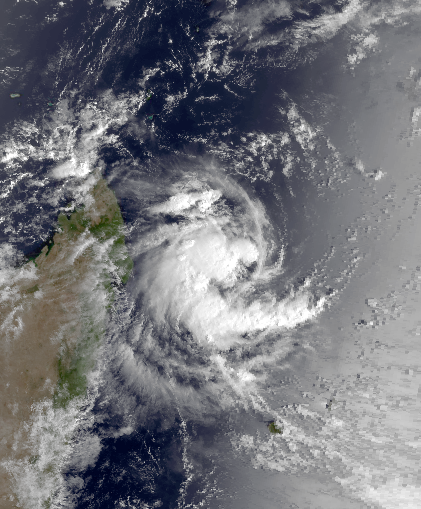
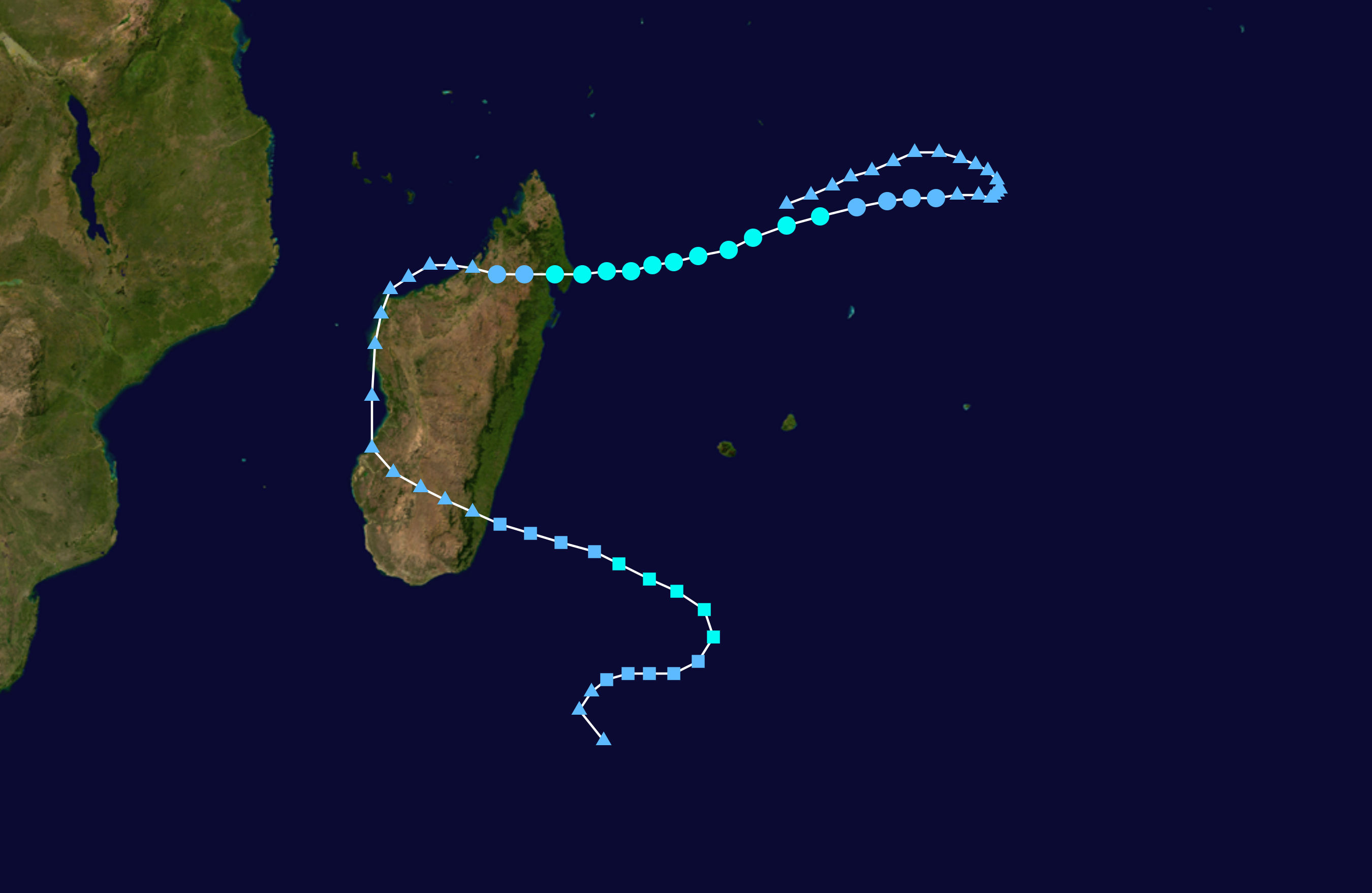
- Duration: December 25 – January 10
- Peak intensity: 70 km/h (45 mph) (10-min); 988 hPa (mbar)

The MFR began monitoring a tropical depression on December 25 about 900 km (550 mi) east-northeast of the northern tip of Madagascar. Initially moving eastward without any strengthening, the depression turned back to the west toward Madagascar on December 28 due to a ridge. Two days later, the JTWC also began tracking the system, designating it as Tropical Cyclone 10S. With warmer water temperatures but persistent wind shear, the system strengthened into Tropical Storm Bryna on December 31. At 1800 UTC that day, the MFR estimated peak 10‑minute winds of 70 km/h (45 mph). On January 1, the JTWC estimated peak 1‑minute winds of 85 km/h (55 mph), before assessing that Bryna began weakening. The storm made landfall in the Sava Region of eastern Madagascar early on January 2 and subsequently crossed the northern portion of the country. Although the JTWC discontinued advisories while Bryna was inland, the MFR continued tracking it, and the circulation emerged into the Mozambique Channel on January 3, moving around a ridge. Bryna curved to the south, brushing Melaky before moving farther offshore. The MFR estimated a secondary peak intensity of 65 km/h (40 mph) on January 7, based on ship reports, although the structure was more subtropical in nature. Around that time, Bryna was turning to the southeast, and the next day made a final landfall in southwestern Madagascar. After crossing the southern portion of the country, Bryna moved over open waters, eventually turning back to the southwest before dissipating on January 10.

While moving over Madagascar, Bryna dropped heavy rainfall, causing some damage and two deaths in Mahajanga.

=== Moderate Tropical Storm Celesta ===
- Moderate tropical storm (MFR)
- Tropical storm (SSHWS)
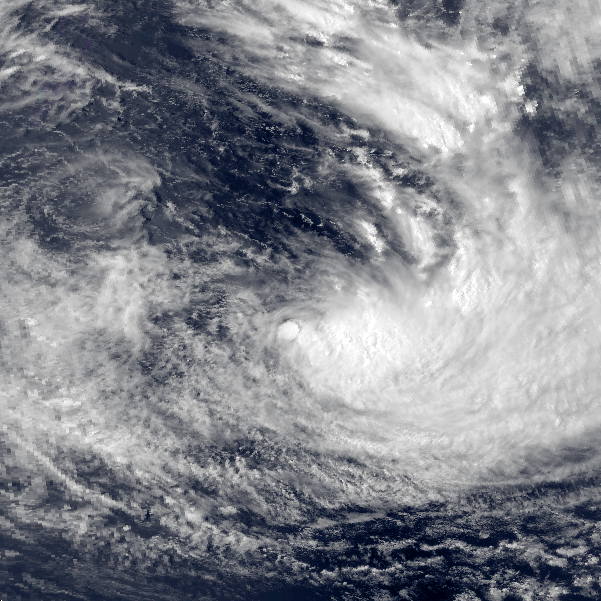
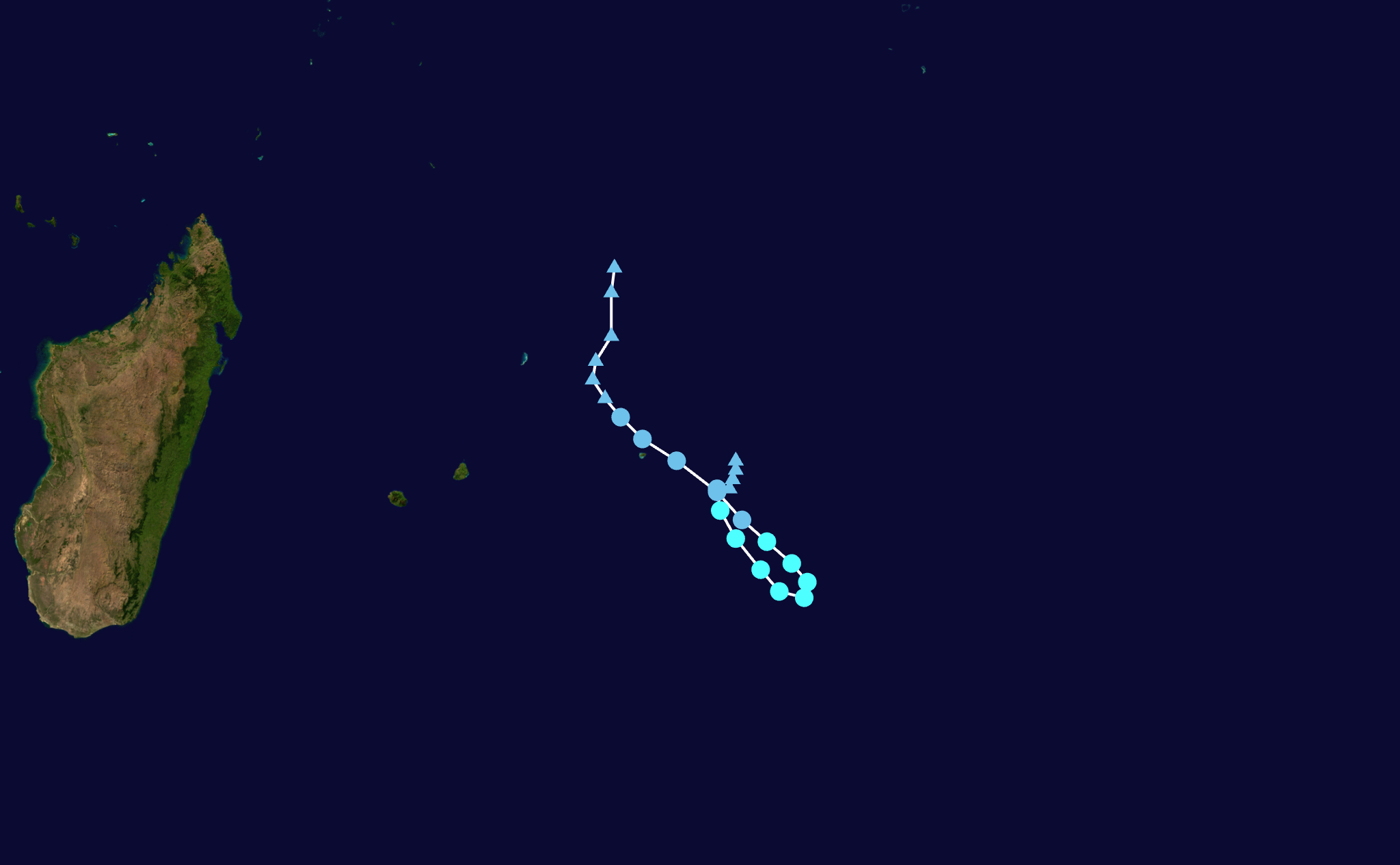
- Duration: February 8 – February 14
- Peak intensity: 80 km/h (50 mph) (10-min); 985 hPa (mbar)

After a period of inactivity lasting about a month, a tropical depression formed from the monsoon trough about 900 km (560 mi) northeast of Mauritius on February 8. The system moved generally to the south and southeast, passing just east of Rodrigues on February 10. Later that day, the depression intensified into Tropical Storm Celesta. On February 11, both the JTWC and the MFR estimated peak winds of 80 km/h (50 mph). Celesta turned to the south and looped to the northwest, crossing over its track on February 12. The storm dissipated on February 14, having succumbed to wind shear. Despite Celesta passing near Rodriduges, winds on the island did not exceed 19 km/h (11 mph).

=== Moderate Tropical Storm Davilia ===
- Moderate tropical storm (MFR)
- Tropical storm (SSHWS)
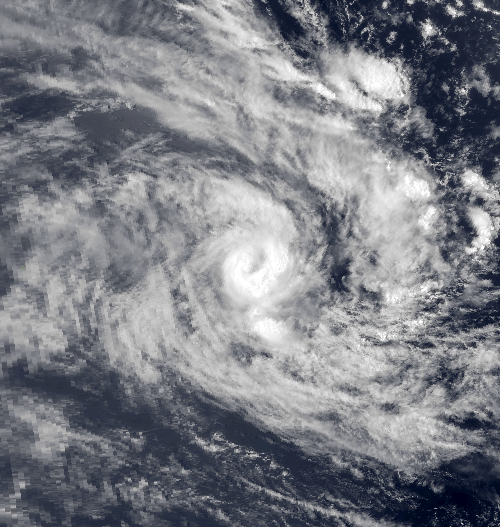
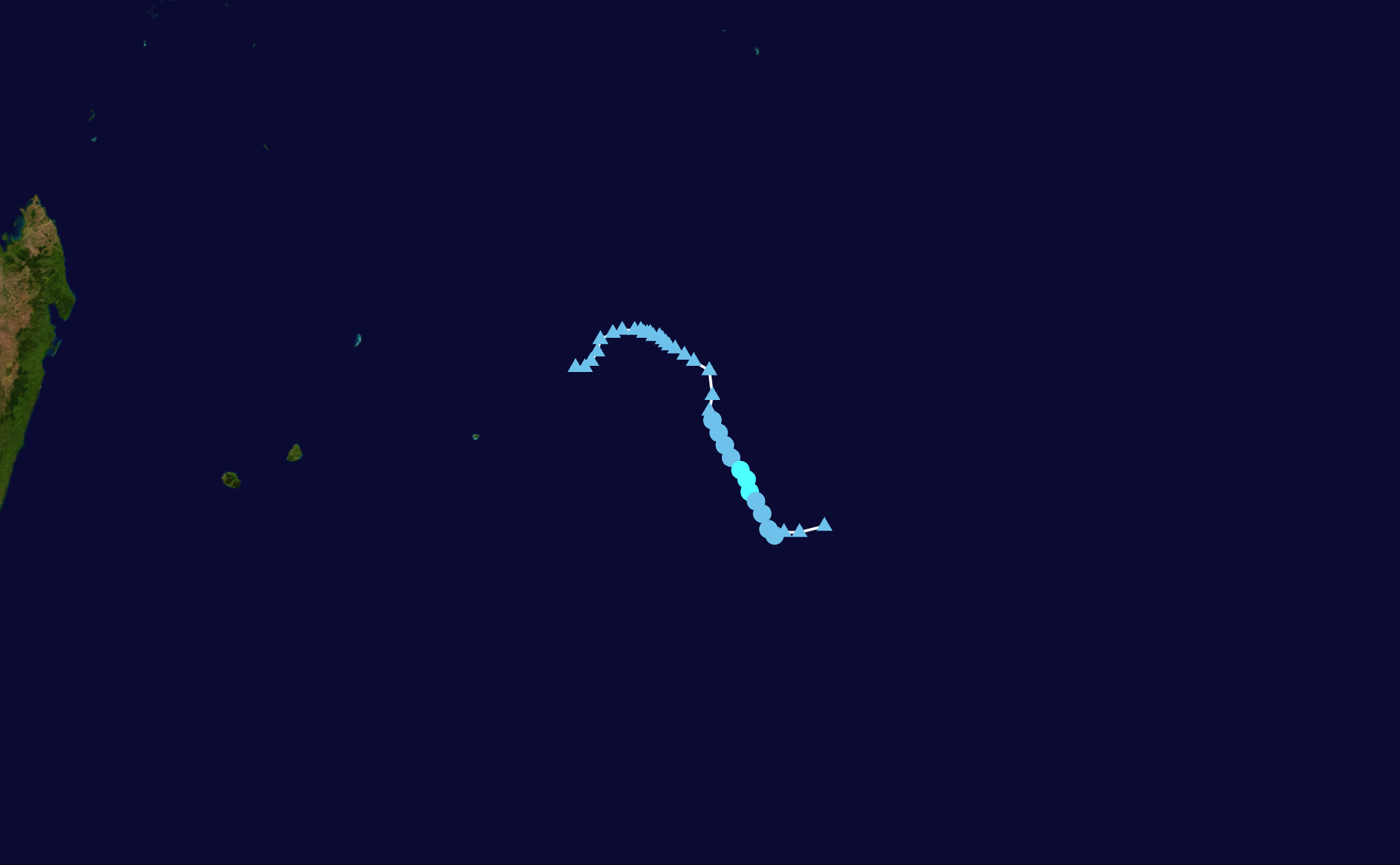
- Duration: February 16 – February 25
- Peak intensity: 70 km/h (45 mph) (10-min); 988 hPa (mbar)

Two days after Celesta dissipated, another tropical depression formed in the same region on February 16 from a broad low-pressure area involving Celesta's remnants. It moved northeastward and later turned to the southeast due to a trough. The new depression vacillated in intensity but remained weak. On February 22, the JTWC also began issuing warnings on the depression, designating it as Tropical Cyclone 19S. On the next day, the MFR upgraded the depression to Tropical Storm Davilia, estimating peak winds of 70 km/h (45 mph). Continuing to the southeast, Davilia failed to intensify further due to persistent wind shear, and it dissipated on February 25.

=== Moderate Tropical Storm Elizabetha ===
- Moderate tropical storm (MFR)
- Tropical storm (SSHWS)
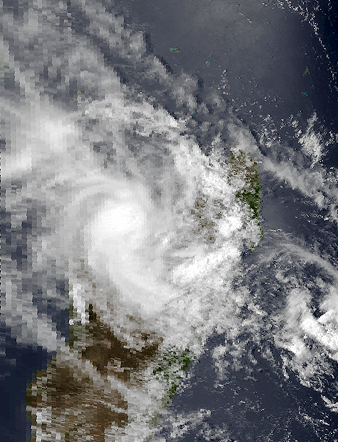
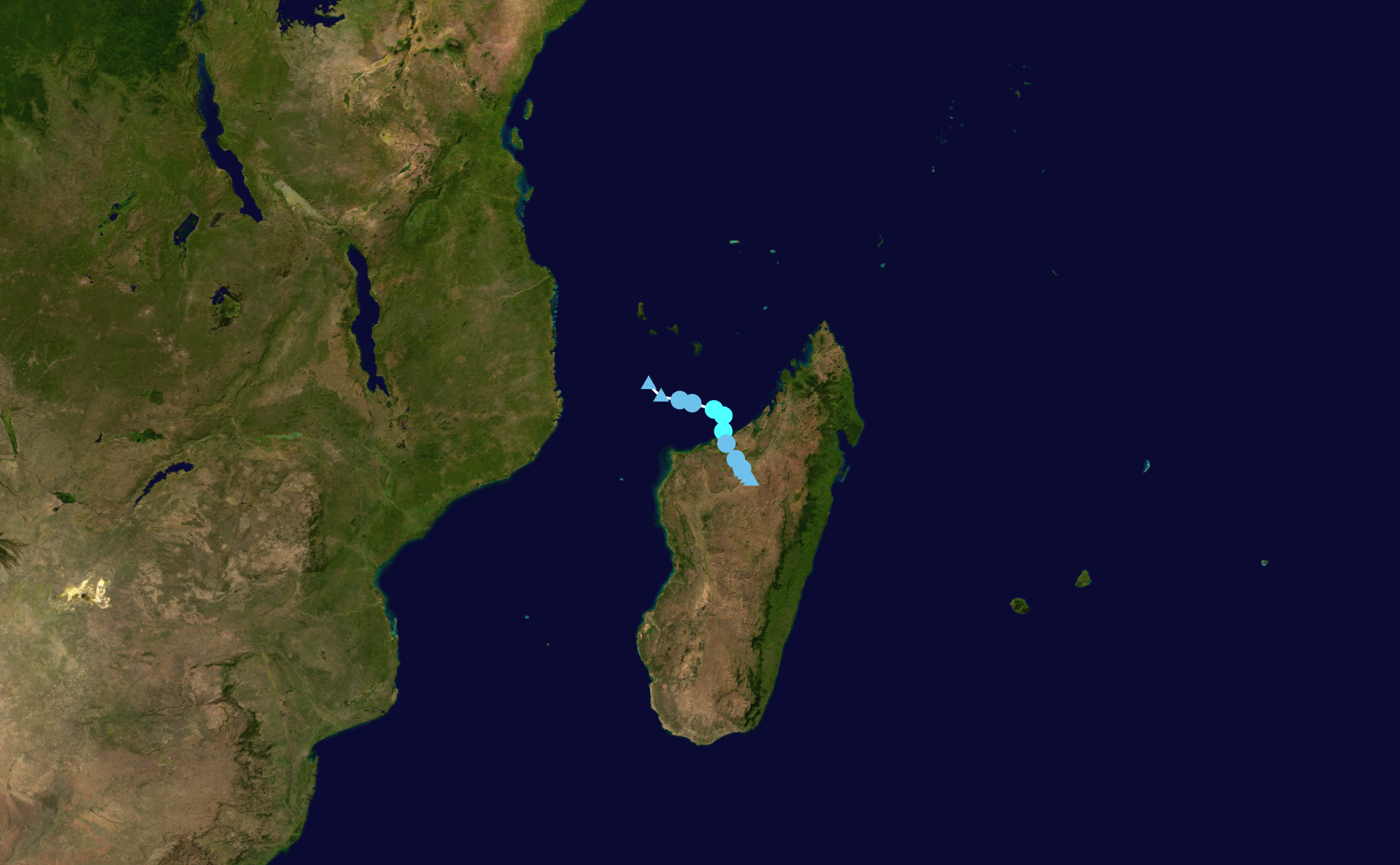
- Duration: February 22 – February 26
- Peak intensity: 65 km/h (40 mph) (10-min); 992 hPa (mbar)

Late on February 22, a tropical depression formed within a broad area of convection south of the Comoros in the Mozambique Channel. With warm water temperatures, it gradually intensified while moving east-southeastward, and MFR upgraded it to Tropical Storm Elizabetha on February 24. After reaching winds of 65 km/h (40 mph), the storm weakened back to tropical depression status and turned sharply southward, making landfall just west of Mahajanga in western Madagascar. Elizabetha weakened further over land and dissipated on February 26, producing wind gusts of 87 km/h (54 mph) at Mahajanga. The JTWC did not issue any advisories in the storm.

=== Tropical Cyclone Farida ===
- Tropical cyclone (MFR)
- Category 4 tropical cyclone (SSHWS)
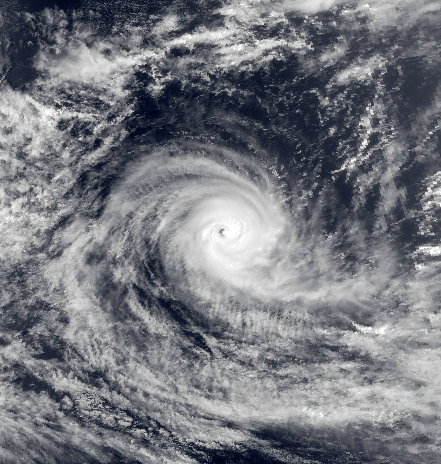
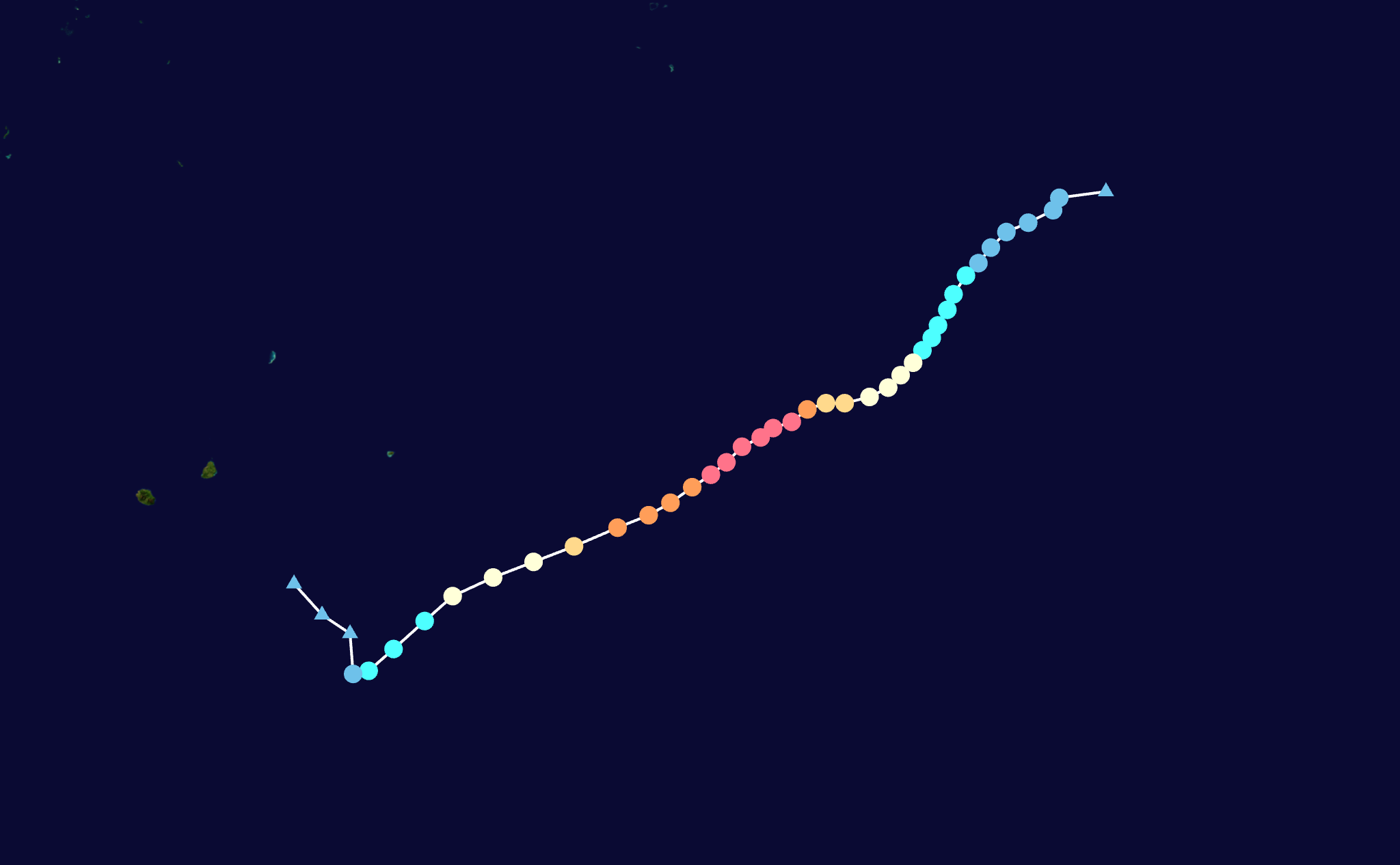
- Duration: February 23 – March 4
- Peak intensity: 150 km/h (95 mph) (10-min); 941 hPa (mbar)

A tropical depression developed in the northeast portion of the basin on February 23 within the monsoon trough, classified as Tropical Cyclone 22S by the JTWC. For much of its duration, the storm moved southwestward due to weak steering currents. It intensified into Tropical Storm Farida on February 25. Two days later, the JTWC upgraded the storm to the equivalent of a minimal hurricane, and the next day the MFR upgraded Farida to tropical cyclone status. The cyclone intensified further, reaching peak 10‑minute winds of 150 km/h (95 mph) according to MFR, and peak 1‑minute winds of 220 km/h (135 mph) according to JTWC. While near peak intensity, the cyclone had developed well-defined outflow, and around that time was interacting with Tropical Storm Gerda to its northwest. Due to increasing wind shear, Farida gradually weakened, first below tropical cyclone intensity on March 1, and to tropical depression intensity the next day. Late in its duration, the system turned to the northwest before dissipating on March 4.

=== Moderate Tropical Storm Gerda ===
- Moderate tropical storm (MFR)
- Tropical storm (SSHWS)
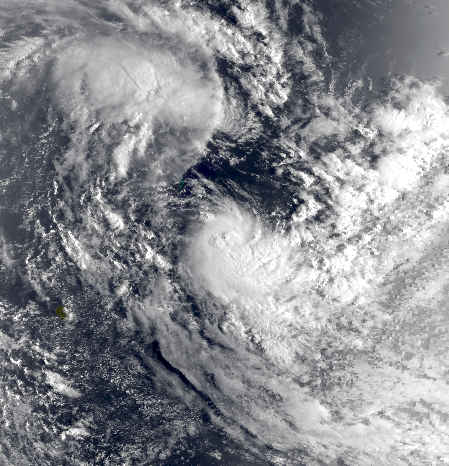
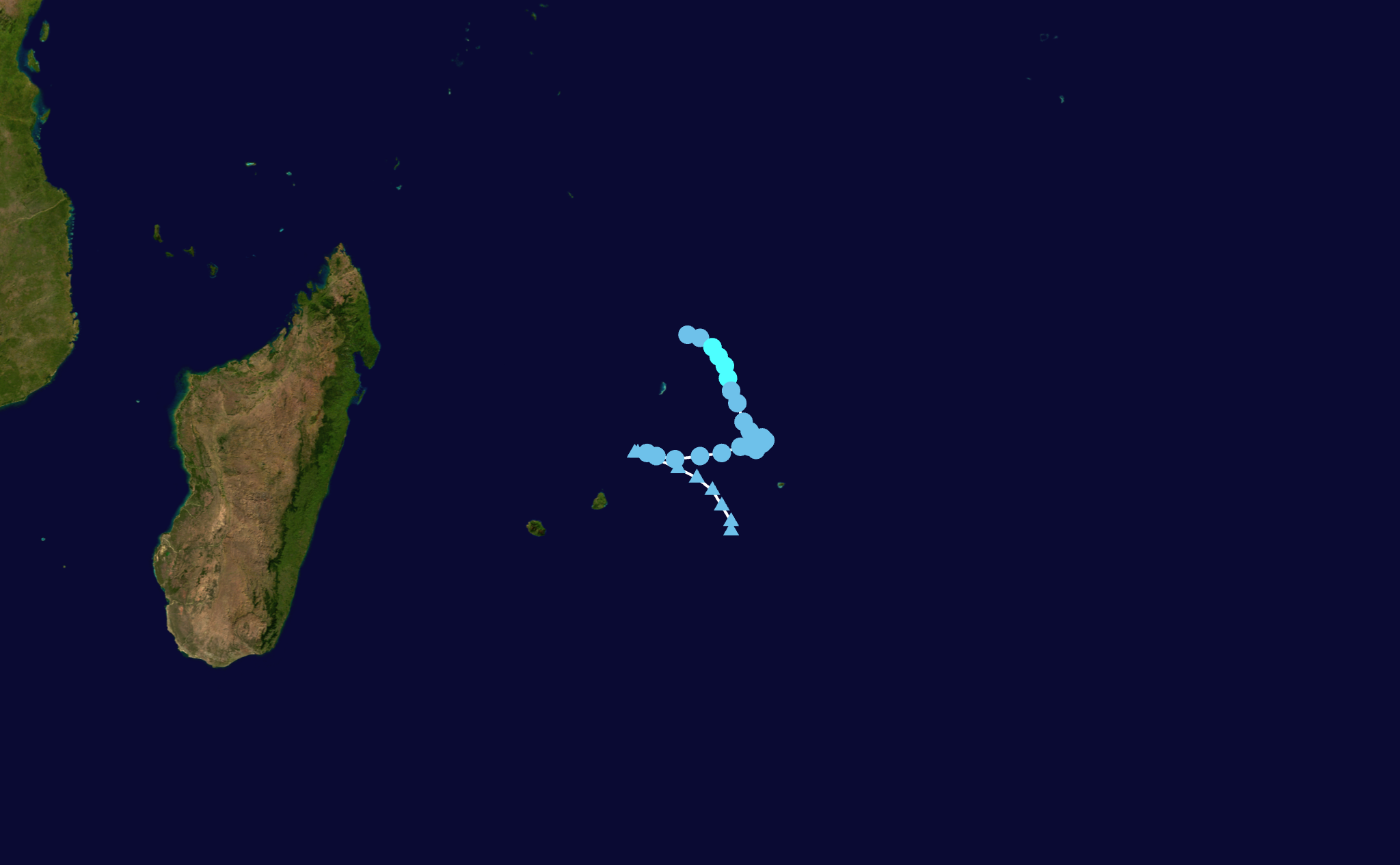
- Duration: February 24 – March 4
- Peak intensity: 65 km/h (40 mph) (10-min); 992 hPa (mbar)

A tropical depression formed northwest of Reunion on February 24, which moved generally eastward. The next day, the depression passed north of Reunion and Mauritius and south of St. Brandon, before turning to the northeast. The system was located near another tropical depression to the northeast, and both vortexes were tracked for several days. On February 26, the JTWC began issuing advisories on Tropical Cyclone 24, although the agency estimated the system was located farther to the north, closer to where the other tropical depression was. The JTWC assessed tropical storm intensity on February 27, noting the system was moving generally southeastward, although the MFR tracked the depression as executing a loop before turning to the southeast. On February 29, the MFR estimated peak 10‑minute sustained winds of 65 km/h (40 mph), upgrading it to Tropical Storm Gerda. At the same time, the JTWC had downgraded Gerda to a tropical depression. The system turned to the southwest, executing another large loop before resuming its southwest trajectory on March 1. That day, Gerda weakened to a tropical depression, before executing a third loop to the northeast and later to the southeast, passing between Mauritius and Rodrigues. On March 4, Gerda dissipated, having produced gusts to 100 km/h (60 mph) on Rodrigues.

=== Intense Tropical Cyclone Harriet–Heather ===
- Intense tropical cyclone (MFR)
- Category 4 tropical cyclone (SSHWS)
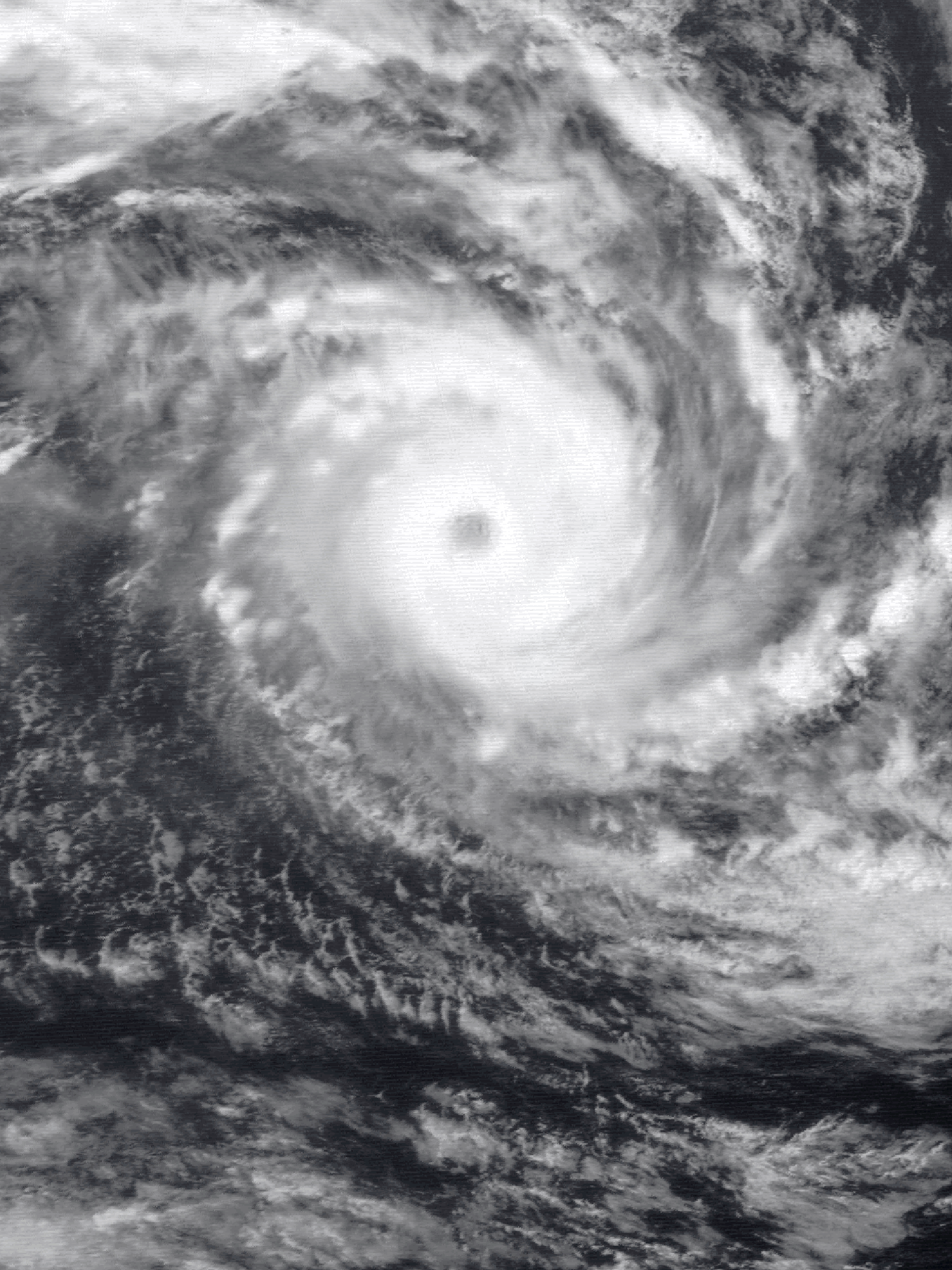
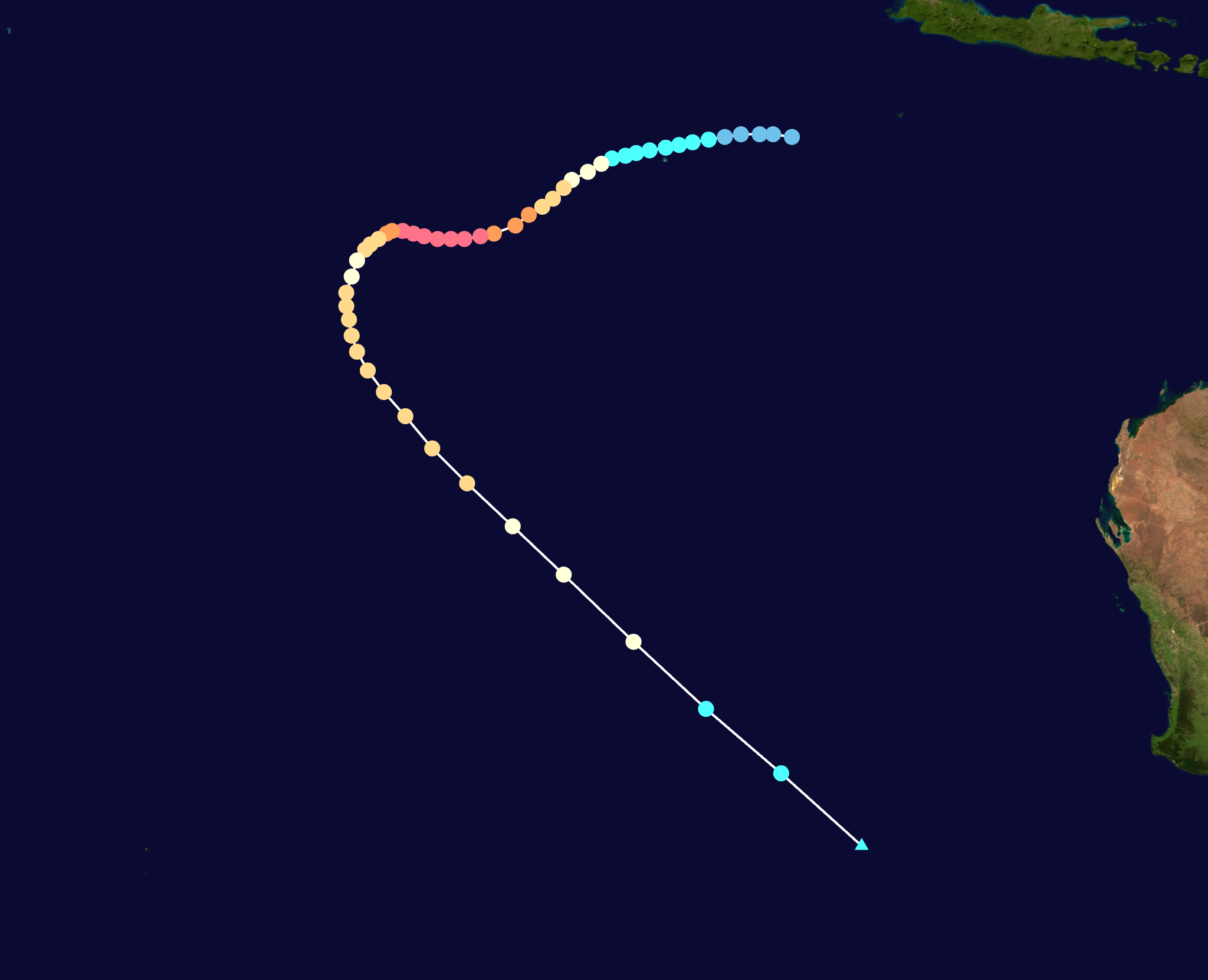
- Duration: March 1 (Entered basin) – March 7 (Out of area)
- Peak intensity: 165 km/h (105 mph) (10-min); 930 hPa (mbar)

The monsoon trough spawned a tropical low about 550 km (340 mi) east of the Cocos Islands on February 24. Located in the Australian basin, it quickly intensified to tropical storm status and was named "Harriet" by the BoM, and Tropical Cyclone 20S by the JTWC. After passing just south of North Keeling Island, Harriet turned more to the southwest, and strengthened into a Category 5 on the Australian tropical cyclone intensity scale on March 1. By that time, the MFR had begun issuing advisories, and later that day renamed Harriet as Heather after the cyclone crossed into the south-west Indian Ocean. When Heather reached the basin, the JTWC was estimating peak 1‑minute winds of 220 km/h (135 mph), and shortly thereafter the MFR estimated peak 10‑minute winds of 165 km/h (105 mph).

On March 4, an approaching trough turned the cyclone to the south and southeast, producing stronger wind shear that induced weakening. By that time, the JTWC estimated Heather had weakened to a 1‑minute intensity of 150 km/h (95 mph). The cyclone reintensified slightly while accelerating to the southeast, and MFR estimated Heather re-attained its peak of 165 km/h (105 mph) on March 5. Soon after, the storm began weakening again, and on March 7 Heather exited into the Australian region below tropical cyclone status. The cyclone continued to the southeast, becoming extratropical on March 8 and dissipating the next day in the Great Australian Bight.

=== Tropical Cyclone Jane–Irna ===
- Tropical cyclone (MFR)
- Category 4 tropical cyclone (SSHWS)
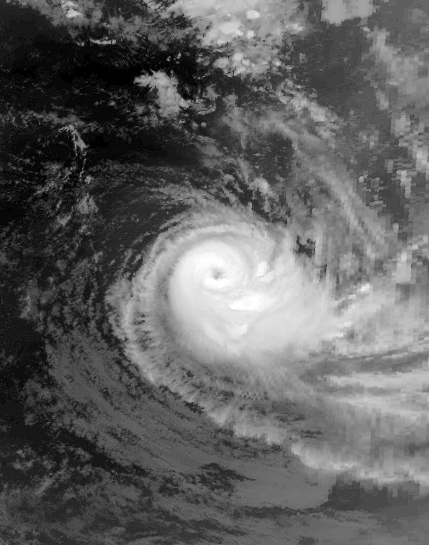
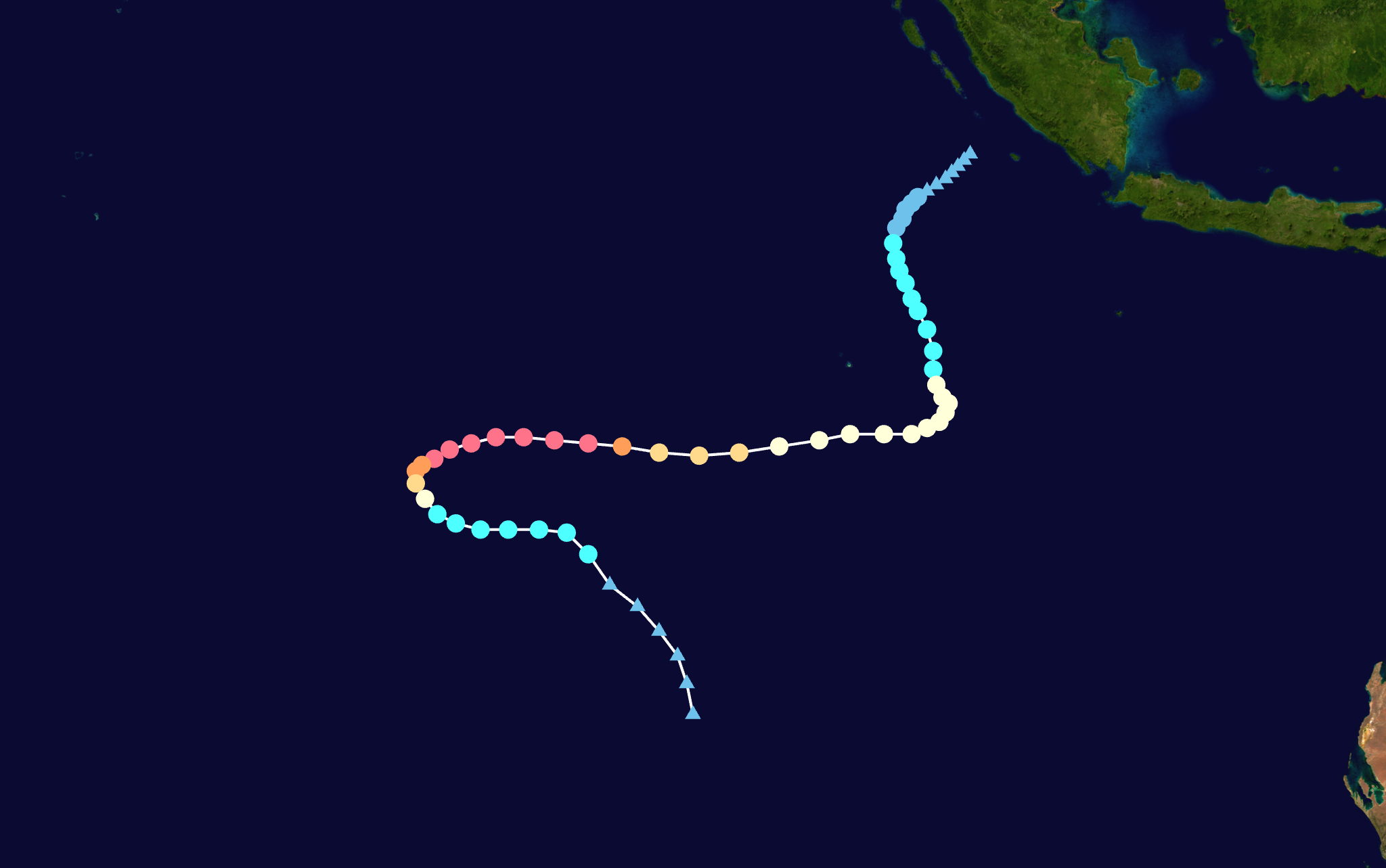
- Duration: April 14 (Entered basin) – April 19 (Exited basin)
- Peak intensity: 140 km/h (85 mph) (10-min); 950 hPa (mbar)

The final storm of the season formed in the Australian basin, and like Harriet-Heather also originated out of the monsoon trough. On April 7, a tropical low developed northeast of the Cocos Islands, and gradually intensified while moving southward, becoming Tropical Cyclone Jane the next day. The JTWC classified it as Tropical Cyclone 29S. A ridge to the south turned the storm to the west on April 11. The cyclone intensified further, developing an eye, and crossed into the south-west Indian Ocean on April 13. At that time, the MFR renamed Jane as Tropical Cyclone Irna. Late on April 13, the agency estimated peak 10‑minute sustained winds of 140 km/h (85 mph). The next day, the JTWC estimated Irna reached peak 1‑minute winds of 220 km/h (135 mph). Subsequently, an approaching trough turned the cyclone to the south and increased wind shear, which caused weakening. The eye dissipated, and Irna soon weakened below tropical cyclone status. On April 17, Irna weakened into a tropical depression. The next day, the JTWC discontinued advisories, and on April 19, Irna crossed back into the Australian region, dissipating on April 20.

=== Other systems ===
While storms Farida and Gerda were both active, Tropical Depression H1 formed east of Madagascar on February 26, and throughout its duration moved in a circular direction around Gerda. The depression moved to the east but slowly executed a clockwise loop around St. Brandon. It never intensified beyond winds of 55 km/h (35 mph), and dissipated on March 1. On March 7, the MFR identified a subtropical cyclone in the Mozambique Channel, but did not issue warnings on it.

== Season effects ==
This table lists all the cyclones that developed in the Indian Ocean, during the 1991–92 South-West Indian Ocean cyclone season. It includes their intensity, duration, name, landfalls, deaths, and damages.

Name	Dates	Peak intensity			Areas affected	Damage (USD)	Deaths	Ref(s).
Name	Dates	Category	Wind speed	Pressure	Areas affected	Damage (USD)	Deaths	Ref(s).
01S	September 10–13	Moderate Tropical Storm	85 km/h (55 mph)	Unknown				
A2	October 14–22	Tropical depression	50 km/h (30 mph)	997 hPa (29.44 inHg)				
A3	October 16–22	Tropical depression	50 km/h (30 mph)	997 hPa (29.44 inHg)				
A4	November 21–29	Moderate Tropical Storm	65 km/h (40 mph)	991 hPa (29.26 inHg)				
Alexandra	December 18–29	Severe Tropical Storm	105 km/h (65 mph)	972 hPa (28.7 inHg)	None	None	None	
Bryna	December 25 – January 10	Moderate Tropical Storm	70 km/h (45 mph)	988 hPa (29.17 inHg)	Tromelin, Madagascar			
Celesta	February 8 – 14	Moderate Tropical Storm	80 km/h (50 mph)	985 hPa (29.08 inHg)	Rodrigues			
Davilia	February 16 – 25	Moderate Tropical Storm	70 km/h (45 mph)	988 hPa (29.17 inHg)				
Elizabetha	February 22 – 26	Moderate Tropical Storm	65 km/h (40 mph)	992 hPa (29.29 inHg)	Madagascar			
Farida	February 23 – March 4	Tropical Cyclone	150 km/h (95 mph)	941 hPa (27.78 inHg)				
Gerda	February 24 – March 4	Moderate Tropical Storm	65 km/h (40 mph)	992 hPa (29.29 inHg)	Mauritius, Rodrigues			
H1	February 26 – March 1	Tropical depression	55 km/h (35 mph)	995 hPa (29.38 inHg)				
Harriet-Heather	March 1 (Entered basin) – 7 (Exited basin)	Intense Tropical Cyclone	165 km/h (105 mph)	930 hPa (27.46 inHg)				
Jane-Irna	April 14 (Entered basin) – 19 (Exited basin)	Tropical Cyclone	140 km/h (85 mph)	950 hPa (28.05 inHg)				
Season aggregates
14 systems	December 18 – April 19		165 km/h (105 mph)	930 hPa (27.46 inHg)		none	none	

== See also ==
- List of Southern Hemisphere tropical cyclone seasons
- Tropical cyclones in 1991 and 1992
- Atlantic hurricane seasons: 1991, 1992
- Pacific hurricane seasons: 1991, 1992
- Pacific typhoon seasons: 1991, 1992
- North Indian Ocean cyclone seasons: 1991, 1992
