= Brianne =

Brianne is a given name variant of Brianna. Notable people with the name include:

- Brianne Berkson (born 1985), American actress
- Brianne Davis (born 1982), American actress
- Brianne Desa (born 2000), Canadian-Guyanese footballer
- Brianne Howey (born 1989), American actress
- Brianne Jenner (born 1991), Canadian ice hockey player
- Brianne Leary (born 1957), American actress
- Brianne McLaughlin (born 1987), American ice hockey player
- Brianne Moncrief (born 1983), American actress
- Brianne Murphy (1933–2003), British cinematographer
- Brianne Nadeau (born 1980), Democratic politician
- Brianne Nelson (born 1980), American long-distance runner
- Brianne Pfannenstiel (born 1988), American journalist
- Brianne Reed (born 1994), American soccer player
- Brianne Siddall (born 1963), American voice actress
- Brianne Theisen-Eaton (born 1988), Canadian track and field athlete
- Brianne Tju (born 1998), American actress
- Brianne Tutt (born 1992), Canadian speed skater
- Brianne West, New Zealand entrepreneur

== See also ==
- Breanne, a list of people with the given name
