= Sher Machado =

Brazilian esports event organizer and streamer

- Born: 1993 (age 32–33); Nilópolis, Rio de Janeiro, Brazil
- Other names: Transcurecer
- Occupations: Esports event organizer, streamer
- Known for: Creating the Rebecca Heineman Cup

Sher Machado (born 1993), also known as Transcurecer, is a Brazilian esports event organizer and streamer.

== Biography ==
Sher Machado was born in Nilópolis, Rio de Janeiro, in 1993. She began playing video games at the age of seven. Growing up in the 1990s and 2000s, she experienced prejudice in online games. In 2015, she discovered the game League of Legends, and attended events like the Campeonato Brasileiro de League of Legends. At the time, she didn't feel represented because the scene consisted mainly of cisgender heterosexual white men. Additionally, she had not yet transitioned to a trans woman. In 2016, she did her first live stream at a friend's house, a career she wanted to pursue, but lacked a good computer to do so.

In 2019, she joined Capacitrans, a project aimed at empowering trans people in the workplace. Later, she became the project's general secretary. She is also part of the Wakanda Streamers team, established in 2018 to support and unite the Black community. She is an ambassador for Ceres Trans, a project by photographer Caio Oliver that gives visibility to Black trans models. During this time, she started studying physics.

In 2020, during the COVID-19 pandemic, she began creating content online and launched a crowdfunding campaign, which Machado described as the kickoff to her streaming career. In July, she managed to buy a new computer with the help of influencer Nath Finanças. Her streams typically feature games by Riot Games such as League of Legends, Valorant, and Teamfight Tactics. Her YouTube channel was created the same year under the name "Transcurecer".

At the end of 2020, Machado received an offer to develop a project in partnership with STrigi Manse, an esports organization notable for supporting diversity. She then created the Rebecca Heineman Cup (CRH), a League of Legends tournament exclusively for trans people. The event was named after Rebecca Heineman, the first person to win an esports championship in the United States and a trans woman. The first edition took place on January 29, 2021, the National Trans Visibility Day in Brazil. The event gained international attention, leading her to join the Brazilian esports organization INTZ in February making her the first trans woman to be hired by an esports organization in the country. A second edition took place in July 2022.

Sher starred in the documentary series Mundo Invisível dos Gamers (The Invisible World of Gamers), released on HBO on May 7, 2024.

== Awards and nominations ==
Year	Award	Category	Result	Ref.
2022	CCXP Awards	Best Female Streamer	Won	
