= Breanne =

Breanne is a feminine given name. It may refer to:

- Breanne Davis, American politician elected in 2018
- Breanne Dürenberger (born 1987), stage name Breanne Düren, American keyboard player and singer
- Breanne Hill (born 1990), American actress
- Breanne Knapp (born 1990), Canadian curler
- Breanne Nicholas (born 1994), Canadian rugby sevens player
- Breanne Siwicki (born 1995), Canadian open water swimmer

== See also ==
- Brianne, a list of people with the given name
- Brianna, a list of people with the given name
