= Bryanna Nasck =

Brazilian digital influencer

Bryanna Nasck is a Brazilian host, digital influencer, streamer, and professional League of Legends player.

== Career ==
Born in the interior of the state of São Paulo in 1993 or 1994, she was introduced to the world of gaming at the age of four. While playing MMORPGs, she always created female characters, using the experience to explore her identity from an early age. After completing high school through the Youth and Adult Education program (EJA), she launched her YouTube channel in 2011. She later co-created the podcast Garotrans alongside Cup and Isabel Brandão, who are also trans. Since 2017, she has been livestreaming Free Fire. In 2021, she sponsored Brazil’s first esports tournament for trans people, the Rebecca Heineman Cup, which was created by Sher Machado.

In September 2022, when she was scheduled to host the Brasil Game Show, Bryanna was accredited under her deadname. She accused the event of transphobia. Following the incident, the organizers updated their policies to allow the use of chosen names. In October, she revealed that she had turned down a job offer related to the 2022 FIFA World Cup in Qatar, fearing for her life due to the country's transphobic laws. From April to December 2023, she served as the host of the podcast Azamigas, produced by TV Zyn, the youth-focused YouTube channel of the Brazilian Television System (SBT).

== Personal life ==
She is a transgender woman and non-binary, using the pronouns she/her. She identifies as demisexual and pansexual.
