= Bryna (given name) =

- Gender: Female

Origin
- Meaning: Strong One

Other names
- Related names: Brana, Breanna, Breayanna, Breeanna, Brenee, Briahna, Briana, Brianna, Briannah, Brianni, Briauna, Briaunna, Brieanna, Brienna, Briney, Brinna, Briny, Bryana, Bryanna, Bryauna, Brynna.

Bryna is an Irish feminine name used mostly in North America. An uncommon name meaning "Strong One", Bryna may be a variant form of Breena, a variant spelling of Brenna, or a variant of Brianna, the female form Brian.

Bryna may be a feminine form of the Celtic Bren, derived from the root bri "strength," force." Alternatively, it may be derived from the Gaelic bran "raven."

Bryna is also used as a Jewish name, as an anglicised form of Yiddish ברײַנע (Brayne).

Notable people with the name include:

- Bryna Ivens Untermeyer (1909–1985), American writer and editor
- Bryna Kra (born 1966), American mathematician
- Bryna Raeburn (1915–1985), American radio and voice actress
- Bryna Taubman, American journalist and writer
