= Brianna Lance =

American fashion designer and artist

- Born: 1982 (age 43–44); San Jose, California, USA
- Known for: Fashion designer, artist
- Website: briannalance.com

Brianna Lance is an American fashion designer and artist based in New York City.

Lance's career initially focused on fashion. She became the head designer for the environmentally-conscious brand Reformation from 2010 to 2015.

In 2015, she was approached by lead guitarist and vocalist Freddie Cowan of the English indie rock band The Vaccines to design uniforms for their 2015 tour; she couldn't find anything suitable, so Lance decided to create her own menswear line called Basic Rights. She got inspiration by studying the wardrobes of iconic male figures such as Paul Newman, Steve McQueen, and Muhammad Ali.

Lance is drawn to creative pursuits, and her career in recent years has branched out in many artistic directions. She was described by Harper's Bazaar as a "statuesque redhead with a sunny smile" and a "downtown cool girl" who is a "true modern-day Renaissance woman". She has created different types of art as a painter, a sculptor and a visual artist, sometimes working with textiles. She was a disc jockey at Fashion Week parties, "spinning tunes with tomboy flair in slip dresses and Converse sneakers." She has performed with the all-women band Bad Girlfriend. A self-described "hippie at heart", she wore fashion designs by Elizabeth Azen for the Women's March on Washington.

Lance was born in San Jose, California in 1982. She lives and works in New York City.
