= Brianna Kahane =

American child violinist (born 2002)

- Born: 2002 (age 22–23)
- Instrument: Violin

Brianna Kahane (born 2002) is an American child violinist who has played since she was three and has been performing at concerts since she was six. Brianna has been featured on talk shows such as Ellen and Oprah. She has been acclaimed by President Bill Clinton and Oprah Winfrey.

== Biography ==
Born in 2002, she was raised in Delray Beach, Florida. She began playing the violin at age three and has been performing at charity concerts since she was six. After following her performance at the 2010 Starkey Hearing Foundation Gala in Saint Paul, Minnesota when she was just eight years old, President Bill Clinton confided: "Wow.... If I could have played saxophone the way Brianna plays violin, I'd have gone into a different line of work." She played on the Oprah Winfrey Show in March 2011 where she was welcomed as one of the most gifted children and a violin prodigy. Brianne Kahane was delighted at the encounter with Oprah: "It was the thrill of my life! I always wanted to meet her. I mean, she's my idol - working for charities, helping people around the world."

In 2011, when only nine, she entered the Juilliard School in New York City, one of the world's leading music schools. As the youngest recipient ever, she plays a violin from the Stradivari Society which means, she is considered playing on a level that is mature enouch to play a stradivarius violin and lucky her: she has the body size to play on a 4/4 sizes instrument which most 9 year olds don't have. That's necessary to get a stradivarius because there are no 1/2 oder 3/4 sized professional level quality instruments made by stradivarius. All her performances are at charity events; she has never been paid for her appearances and she has never made any commercial recordings. While she concentrates on classical music, she also plays pop.

In March 2015, Kahane appeared in a concert given by pre-college students at the Juilliard School.
