= Briana Blasko =

American photographer

- Born: San Francisco, CA, USA
- Education: Tisch School of the Arts at New York University
- Occupation: Photographer
- Website: http://www.brianablasko.com

Briana Blasko is an American portrait photographer and artist. She has photographed celebrated dancers in the U.S. and India. Venturing extensively to reveal and evidence the treasures of her subjects, India has captivated her focus since 2003 and inspired the publication of two books: Dance of the Weave, Penguin Books India (2013), and Within Without: The Path of the Yogi, HarperCollins India (2017).

== Early life and education ==
Born and raised in San Francisco, she has a BFA in photography from the Tisch School of the Arts at New York University. She began her career as an intern for photographer Annie Leibovitz, where she worked for three years as a research and production assistant on Women, Leibovitz's book with Susan Sontag. She continued as a producer for the book, Talking Fashion, by Sarajane Hoare and produced advertisements for Conde Nast Magazines and other clients including J Crew, Calvin Klein and Apple.

== Career ==
Based in New York at the beginning of her career, she spent twelve years photographing contemporary dance as a freelance dance photographer for the New York Times and Dance Magazine. Dance and dance-like movements along with fabrics and weaving were among her chosen photographic subjects early on. She documented many celebrated dancers in the U.S. such as Merce Cunningham Dance Company, Elizabeth Streb, Larry Keigwin, and Shen Wei. In 2003 she travelled to India to study Ashtanga Yoga, with Sri K. Pattabhi Jois. "That was the beginning of my great love for India."

In 2008, she began to pursue work for her book Dance of the Weave, a 208 page compilation which spans five years of shooting in India. In pursuit of her subject, Blasko visited villages where many traditional dance and martial art forms originated as well as many weaving villages, photographing the dancer's interaction with fabric through movement. She reveals the colorful and intricate world of India's treasured textile traditions such as Kancheepuram silk and cotton, Ponduru khadi, Muga silk, and Varanasi silk, and Sambalpuri, Gadwal, and Pochampalli saris.

Through work with dance companies such as Nrityagram, and acclaimed dancers Mrinalini Sarabhai, Priyadarsini Govind, Madhavi Mudghal, and Navtej Johar, she elaborates the regionally cherished dance forms of Bharatnatyam, Kathakali, Manipuri, Odissi, Kuchipudi, Kathak, Mohiniyattam, and Sattriya, as well as martial arts forms Chhau, Kalaripayattu, and Pung Cholom. In the forward to the book, fashion designer Donna Karan writes, "The loveliness of her images in the book you are holding resides in their ability to share the restless conversation between body and fabric."

"If you belong to a culture where the sensual pleasure of adjusting long yards of cloth to the contours of your own body are lost to you, perhaps you may revel in this other world. If you live on this side of the planet where these are simple everyday necessities, then you may delight in those photographs that go beyond the brief as it were."

Nest, a well respected non-profit working for the social and economic advancement of global artisans, partnered with her to showcase the master craftspeople behind India's textile traditions, to counter the trend of dissolving interest in traditional practices due to increased mechanization. Says Blasko, "By highlighting the drapes that are used in dance, I try to show how even a single piece of cloth can hold a sacred position in India."

Accustomed to venturing to remote villages to establish her subject, Blasko began a four-year project for Within Without: The Path of the Yogi, a voyage through India and Nepal where she gained access to the everyday lives of monks, saints, and priests, gurus, and spiritual seekers. Says Blasko, "While I was with these gurus, some of their practices were so intimate, so precious, that I decided not to take out my camera and risk becoming obtrusive. In photography, if you don't take a picture it's as if the event did not happen, but there seems to be a part of me that believes that sometimes not taking a picture is just as valuable." Her photographs give an intimate glimpse into various spiritual cultures including Jain monks, Tibetan lamas, Sufis, Catholic priests, and yoga practitioners.

From Pico Iyer's preface: "What moves me in Briana Blasko's quiet, unintrusive photographs — as in her soulful and beautifully lucid Preface — is her readiness to follow India into the silent places where truly its energy lives. You'll see how everyday are the places and exchanges she's brought back out into the world, and how these white-clad yogis can carry their sense of stillness and purity into the heart of a noisy city."

Blasko deliberately chose not to arrange the subjects by religious faith. Says Blasko, "During the time I spent with yogis of different spiritual persuasions, I realised that there is an innate sameness in their practices that transcends the confines of religion."

== Bibliography ==
- Dance of the Weave, Penguin Books India (2013)
- Within Without: The Path of the Yogi, HarperCollins India (2017)
