= Briana King =

American skateboarder and actress

- Born: Briana King; 1993 (age 32–33); East Los Angeles, California, U.S.
- Occupations: Skateboarder, model, and community organizer

Briana King (born 1993) is a goofy-footed American skateboarder, community organizer, model and actress.

King is from east LA and moved to Australia when she was 18. She became a model and would watch skaters in the park across the street from her home. She left Australia after a mishap with paperwork that caused her to lose her visa and moved to New York City in early 2017. She was reintroduced to skateboarding in New York.

== Early life ==
Briana King grew up in east LA where she says there were a lot of shootings, drive-by's, and inaction by the police force. She describes being kept in a bubble, as her mother did not really allow her or her sister to have friends. She passed her time by playing music, including on the flute, clarinet, piano, vibraphone, guitar, and some violin and cello. At 18, she moved to Australia by herself to model full-time before a paper mishap caused her to return to the United States in 2017.

== Modeling ==
While living in LA, people approached King and her sister about modeling but their mother would not let them. Eventually, she was cast for a job for Macy's off of MySpace. King took the job and moved to Australia by herself with $200.00, where she pursued modeling full-time. King states she chose Australia because it was the furthest English-speaking location she could think of.

Upon returning to the United States, King still modeled, alongside skateboarding. She has stated that skateboarding has made her more confident in her modeling because falling down on her skateboard all the time taught her that she does not always need to be perfect.

King has modeled for brands like Drew House and been recruited for a Calvin Klein advertisement. She has also appeared in music videos for A$AP Rocky and Doja Cat.

== Skateboarding ==
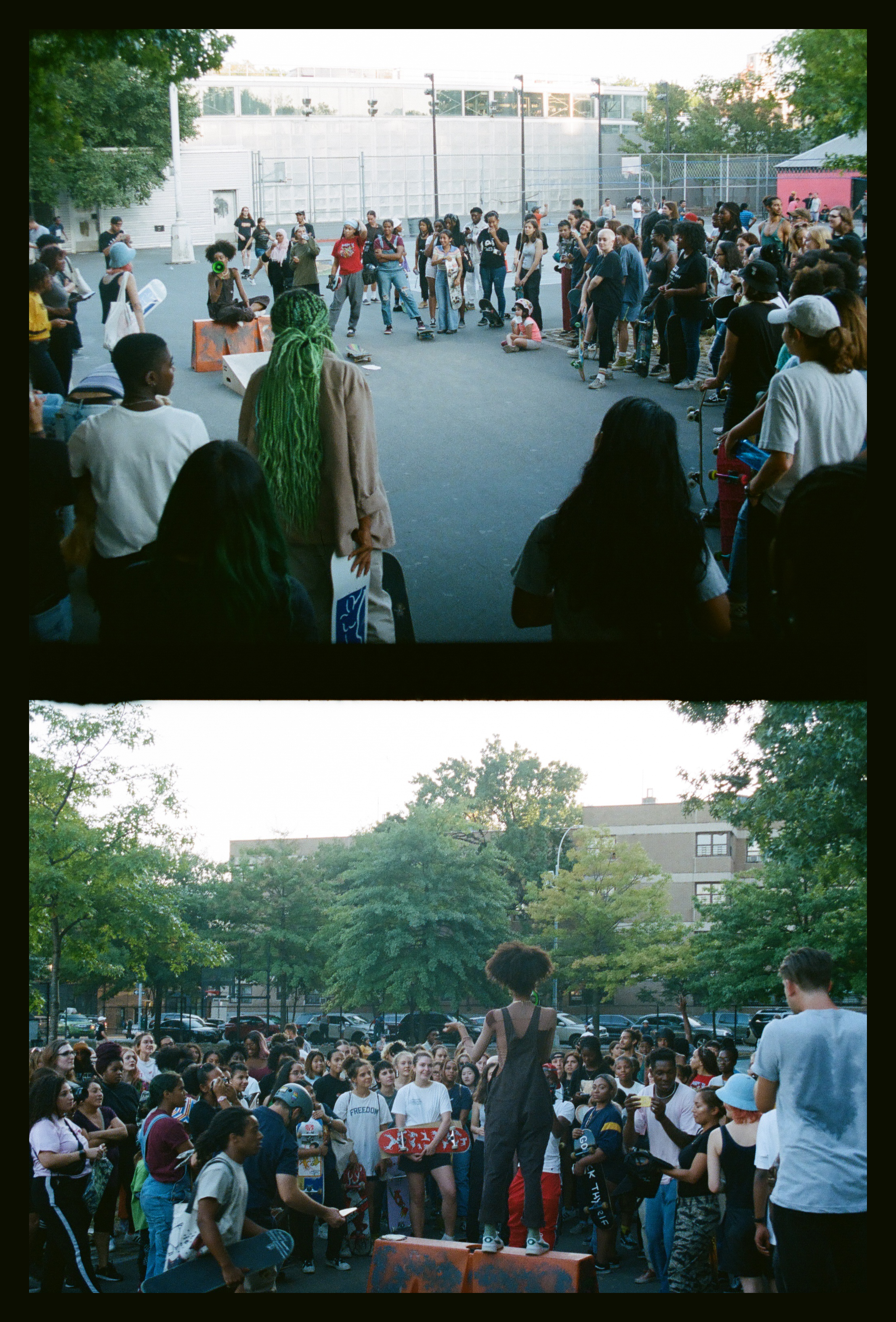
Briana King addresses the crowd at her Push Like a Girl event at Blue Park - Martinez Playground - Brooklyn, NY - 2019

King's first skateboard was a fake Zero Skateboards board that she received at a swap meet when she was 12. After a few weeks of practicing, she tried to ollie down four stairs and broke her leg. King did not pick up skateboarding again until she was 24.

One of the first friends she made in New York skated a lot, and consequently, King was drawn in as well. The first skate sesh she attended in New York was a House of Vans skate sesh. King says she skated for about 7 hours a day that year. King has stated that she suffers a lot from anxiety, but that when she skates she is not as anxious. She says was taking medications for a time, but stopped when she began skating.

King started a TikTok during the COVID-19 pandemic. Her account, which is dedicated to showing skateboarding beginner tips and tricks, has amassed over 400,000 followers.

== Skate Sesh Tour ==
While in Australia, King would often go to skateparks. She would watch the skaters and observe their technique, but felt too intimidated to join in. Consequently, King understood the importance of having a safe space where non-traditional skaters could feel comfortable. This, along with friends often commenting on King's good skateboard teaching skills, inspired her to bring women and LGBT skaters together with her Girl & Queer Skate Sesh where they can skate and enjoy themselves without fearing being judged.

King and her Girl & Queer Skate Sesh have been sponsored by brands like Zappos, Reebok, Vans, and JBL.

In February 2019, King hosted a Girl Skate Sesh at El Sereno Skatepark.
