= Bryna Taubman =

American journalist and writer

Bryna Taubman is an American journalist and writer.

She graduated from Miami University Ohio and the Columbia University Graduate School of Journalism. She worked at the New York Post. Her first book was How to Become an Assertive Woman in 1976.

== Bibliography ==
- How to Become an Assertive Woman - the key to self-fulfillment, Simon & Schuster, 1976 ISBN 0-671-82697-2
- Lady Cop: True Stories of Police Women in America's Toughest City, Warner Books, 1988 ISBN 0-446-34684-5
- The Preppy Murder Trial, St Martins Mass Market Paper; Reissue edition, 1988 ISBN 978-0-312-92205-4
- Hell Hath No Fury: A True Story of Wealth and Passion, Love and Envy, and a Woman Driven to the Ultimate Revenge, Mass Market Paperback Publisher: St. Martin's True Crime Date, 1992 ISBN 978-0-312-92938-1
