= CCXP Awards =

Brazilian pop culture award

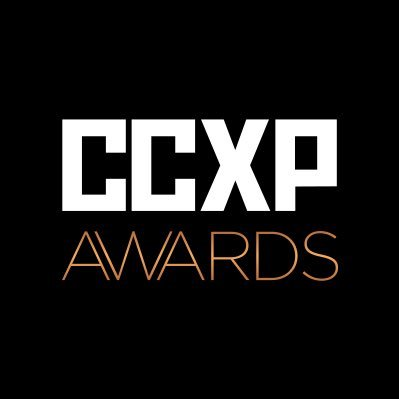
- Awarded for: Brazilian pop culture
- Sponsored by: CCXP
- Location: São Paulo
- Country: Brazil
- First award: 2022
- Website: https://www.ccxpawards.com/

CCXP Awards is a Brazilian award dedicated to various aspects of pop culture, such as cinema, TV series, comics, games, esports and literature. The award is organized by CCXP, a pop culture event that has been taking place since 2014 in São Paulo. The creation of the CCXP Awards was announced during the 2021 edition of the CCXP and the format of its first edition was announced in March 2022, with a total of 32 awards, divided into six categories with several subcategories.

The award project had been ready since 2020, but due to the COVID-19 pandemic, it was postponed until it could be carried out in person (CCXP itself took place only virtually in 2020 and 2021, returning to being in person in 2022). The format of the award and ceremony was inspired by the model of events such as the Oscars, the Cannes Film Festival and The Game Awards, with a gala, celebrity presence, concerts, posthumous tributes and a presentation by a well-known personality.

From the entries, a jury composed of artists, producers, developers, gamers, creators and journalists linked to the entertainment industry defines up to ten nominees by subcategory. After that, a popular vote, accompanied by votes from a Technical Jury, takes place to select up to five finalists. Finally, a new popular vote and the Technical Jury define the winners, who win the Gloria trophy (inspired by a dragon, one of the main symbols of pop culture).

In addition to the 32 winners, there are also special awards: Fandom of the Year, Professional of the Year (endemic and non-endemic) and Grand Prix (main prize, given to the winner who received the most votes among all categories). In addition, five names are honored, being chosen to be part of the Pop Culture Hall of Fame.
