= List of named storms (G) =

Storms are named for historical reasons to avoid confusion when communicating with the public, as more than one storm can exist at a time. Names are drawn in order from predetermined lists. For tropical cyclones, names are assigned when a system has one-, three-, or ten-minute winds of more than 65 km/h (40 mph). Standards, however, vary from basin to basin. For example, some tropical depressions are named in the Western Pacific, while within the Australian and Southern Pacific regions, the naming of tropical cyclones are delayed until they have gale-force winds occurring more than halfway around the storm center.

This list covers the letter G.

== Storms ==
Note: † indicates the name was retired after that usage in the respective basin

- Gabekile (2020) – did not impact land
- Gabrielle

- 1982 – a moderate tropical storm that brushed the islands of Mauritius and Réunion without causing damage.
- 1989 – reached Category 4 and, though never striking land, caused large ocean swells on the East Coast of the United States that killed eight.
- 1995 – strengthened rapidly but formed too close to land to reach hurricane strength before making landfall in Mexico, causing minimal damage.
- 2001 – made landfall near Venice, Florida as a tropical storm, exited back into the ocean and strengthened into a minimal hurricane, degenerating south of Newfoundland.
- 2007 – subtropical storm that became a weak tropical storm prior to making landfall on the Outer Banks of North Carolina, causing light damage.
- 2009 – downgraded to a tropical low in post-analysis, did not affect land.
- 2013 – short-lived, weak tropical storm that formed and dissipated in the Caribbean Sea south of Puerto Rico, but reformed close to Bermuda.
- 2019 – weak and disorganized tropical storm that dissipated over the eastern Atlantic, but later regenerated and intensified into a moderate tropical storm.
- 2023† – a Category 4 severe tropical cyclone which crossed to the South Pacific basin and severely affected Norfolk Island and New Zealand as a subtropical system.
- 2025 – reached Category 4 strength east of Bermuda, affected the Azores as a post-tropical cyclone.

- Gading

- 1966 – struck the Philippines and southern China as a relatively strong tropical storm.
- 1970 – a system that was considered by JMA as a tropical depression and by JTWC as a tropical storm; hit Taiwan and southeastern China.
- 1974 – a tropical storm which did not affect land.
- 1978 – a minimal tropical depression which affected Taiwan.
- 1982 – another short-lived tropical depression that was only tracked by PAGASA.
- 1986 – the strongest tropical cyclone in 1986 and one of the most intense typhoons recorded; struck the Philippines and China causing widespread destruction, killing 422.
- 1990 – relatively strong typhoon which made landfall the Philippines, Taiwan and mainland China, claiming at least 284 lives.
- 1994 – a tropical storm that produced flooding in the Philippines and China together with Severe Tropical Storm Russ, causing at least 13 fatalities but reportedly killing as many as 1,400 people.
- 1998 – a fairly strong typhoon which had a northeastward track and struck the Philippines and Japan, killing a total of 108 people, mostly from the capsizing of the MV Princess of the Orient.

- Gael (2009) – a Category 4 tropical cyclone that affected in the Mauritius and Madagascar.
- Gaenari (2026) – a weak system that lingered near Taiwan and Ryukyu Islands.
- Gaemi

- 2012 – an erratic tropical storm that stuck Vietnam.
- 2018 – a weak tropical storm that caused minor dama huge to Taiwan.
- 2024 – a powerful typhoon that impacted Taiwan and East China, and also drenched western Luzon in the Philippines by enhancing the monsoonal flow.

- Gafilo (2004) – was both the most intense tropical cyclone ever recorded in the South-West Indian Ocean and the most intense tropical cyclone worldwide in 2004.
- Gail

- 1953 – a Category 1 hurricane moving through the open waters of the Atlantic Ocean.
- 1972 – a Category 4 severe tropical cyclone that affected New Caledonia and Vanuatu.
- 1995 – a Category 1 tropical cyclone that affected the island of Rodrigues.

- Gaja (2018) – was the sixth named cyclone of the 2018 North Indian Ocean cyclone season.
- Gamane (2024) – a Category 2 tropical cyclone that made landfall Northern Madagascar.
- Gamma

- 2005 – a late season tropical storm that produced locally heavy rainfall and flooding in Honduras and Belize.
- 2020 – a Category 1 hurricane that brought heavy rains, floods, and landslides to the Yucatán Peninsula.

- Garance (2025) – a Category 3 tropical cyclone that affected in the Mascarene Islands.
- Garding

- 1978 – a relatively long-lived late-season tropical depression that was monitored by JMA, JTWC and PAGASA.
- 1994 – a strong late-season typhoon which affected central Philippines, claiming at least 19 lives.

- Gardo

- 2018 – a Category 5 super typhoon which weakened before making landfall in East China.
- 2022 – a tropical depression that formed over the Philippine Sea and was absorbed by the circulation around Typhoon Hinnamnor.
- 2026 – a weak tropical storm that formed at sea passed near the coast of Japan.

- Garry (2013) – a Category 3 severe tropical cyclone that did not affect land.
- Gary

- 1992 – a severe tropical storm that made landfall Philippines and South China.
- 1995 – a severe tropical storm that made landfall South China.

- Gaston

- 2004 – made landfall in South Carolina; originally designated a tropical storm.
- 2010 – short-lived tropical storm that dissipated before reaching land.
- 2016 – Category 3 hurricane, did not affect land
- 2022 – formed in the middle of the ocean without affecting land.

- Gati (2020) – was the strongest tropical cyclone on record to make landfall in Somalia, and one of few tropical cyclones to do so in the country.
- Gavin

- 1985 – a Category 2 tropical cyclone to impact Fiji, as well as the fourth to impact Vanuatu, during the 1984-85.
- 1997† – a Category 4 severe tropical cyclone tropical cyclone to affect Fiji and was the first of three tropical cyclones to affect the island nations of Tuvalu and Wallis and Futuna.

- Gay

- 1965 – did not make landfall.
- 1981 – a Category 2 typhoon that weakened to a Category 1 before brushing the eastern coast of Japan.
- 1985 – a Category 3 typhoon that remained well off the coast of Japan.
- 1988 – a minimal tropical storm that stayed well out to sea.
- 1989 – a severe tropical cyclone that struck Thailand then crossed into the Indian Ocean Basin becoming a Category 5 tropical cyclone before striking India
- 1992 – long-lived Category 5 super typhoon storm that affected the Marshall Islands and struck Guam.

- Gelena (2019) – was the second storm to affect the island of Rodrigues, damage on the island were about US$1 million.
- Gemma (1997) – churned in the open ocean.
- Gene

- 1990 – moved parallel to Japan, causing heavy rains and 4 deaths.
- 1992 – churned in the open ocean.
- 1993 – a weak system that stayed away from land.
- 2008† - a Category 3 severe tropical cyclone that caused extensive practice to Fiji and Vanuatu.

- Gener

- 2004 – a strong tropical storm that produced deadly flooding in Vietnam and Thailand.Philippines and China.
- 2008 – a tropical depression that was only recognized by PAGASA.
- 2012 – a strong tropical cyclone affecting the Philippines, Taiwan and China.
- 2016 – a powerful tropical cyclone which affected Taiwan and Japan in mid September 2016.
- 2020 – churned in the open ocean.
- 2024 – weak storm that made landfall in Vietnam.

- Genevieve

- 1970 – a strong tropical cyclone affected Madagascar.
- 1984 – a Category 3 hurricane that passed offshore Mexico and dissipated near the southern tip of the Baja California Peninsula.
- 1990 – a Category 2 hurricane, no effect on land.
- 1996 – a long-lived tropical storm, no effect on land.
- 2002 – strong tropical storm, no effect on land.
- 2008 – minimal Category 1, no effect on land.
- 2014 – a long-lasting tropical cyclone crossing all three North Pacific basins; reached Category 3 intensity within the central Pacific basin and Category 5 intensity in the western Pacific, also classified as a violent typhoon.
- 2020 – a Category 4 hurricane that affected the southern tip of the Baja California Peninsula.
- 2026 – a Category 5 hurricane that remained in the open ocean.

- Gening

- 1963 – a tropical depression that did not significantly affect land.
- 1967 – possibly caused Thai Airways International Flight 601 to crash when it passed near Hong Kong.
- 1971 – did not significantly affect land.
- 1975 – moved away from the Philippines.
- 1979 – a severe tropical storm that did not significantly affect land.
- 1983 – did not significantly affect land.
- 1987 – a Category 4 typhoon that affected Japan.
- 1991 – struck the Philippines, Taiwan, Hong Kong, and China, causing 136 deaths.
- 1995 – caused 52 deaths across the Philippines, Taiwan, and China.
- 1999 – a tropical depression.

- George

- 1947 – a long-lived and an intense tropical cyclone that affected the Bahamas, southernmost Florida, and the Gulf Coast of the United States in September 1947.
- 1950 – developed southeast of Bermuda, intensified to Category 2 hurricane and became extratropical south of Newfoundland
- 1951 – struck Bay of Campeche and made landfall in Tampico, Mexico
- 1976 – a tropical depression remained in the open sea.
- 2007† – developed in the Joseph Bonaparte Gulf, intensified to a Category 5 severe tropical cyclone (Australian scale) and hit the Pilbara coast.

- Georges

- 1980 – Category 1 hurricane, remained in the open Atlantic.
- 1998† – Category 4 hurricane, caused severe destruction as it traversed the Caribbean Sea and Gulf of Mexico.

- Georgette

- 1967 – never affected land.
- 1968 – a Category 3 tropical cyclone that struck northern Madagascar.
- 1971 – remained over the open ocean.
- 1975 – had no impact on land.
- 1980 – Category 1 hurricane, did not affect land.
- 1986 – weak storm that degraded into a tropical wave and crossed into the Western Pacific where it reorganized.
- 1992 – Category 2 hurricane, did not affect land.
- 1998 – Category 3 hurricane, did not affect land.
- 2004 – remained over the open ocean
- 2010 – struck Baja California Sur.
- 2016 – Category 4 hurricane, did not affect land.
- 2022 – did not affect land.

- Georgia

- 1951 – a powerful typhoon has little impact on the Marshall Islands.
- 1955 – a powerful category 4 typhoon passed the southern coast of Japan.
- 1959 – made landfall in Japan and in Russia (then the Soviet Union)
- 1962 – passed east of Japan
- 1964 – a weak tropical storm affected Philippines and Indochina.
- 1967 – did not make landfall.
- 1970 – made landfall on Luzon and in China
- 1973 – a strong typhoon that made landfall South China.
- 1976 – moved north away from land.
- 1978 – a weak tropical storm that made landfall Madagascar.
- 1983 – made landfall on Hainan and in Vietnam
- 1986 – crossed the Philippines and mad landfall in Vietnam

- Gerald

- 1981 – churned in the open ocean.
- 1984 – a strong tropical storm made landfall east-northeast of Hong Kong as a tropical depression.
- 1987 – a Category 3 typhoon that affected the Philippines, Taiwan, and China.

- Geralda (1994) – a powerful tropical cyclone that caused catastrophic damage in Madagascar in late January 1994, among the strongest to hit the country.
- Gerda

- 1958 – a strong tropical storm that affected the Caribbean and then crashed onto the coasts of Mexico and Texas.
- 1961 – a powerful tropical storm that struck Cuba and the Bahamas and affected New England as an extratropical cyclone.
- 1969 – a Category 3 hurricane that brought light rain to southern Florida and moderate to heavy rain to eastern North Carolina and New England, causing minor damage.
- 1992 – formed off the coast of Madagascar and had minor influence on Mauritius.

- Gert

- 1981 – caused heavy rainfall to several islands in the Caribbean but no significant damage.
- 1993 – formed near and later made landfall in Central America and then twice in Mexico, before existing the basin and moved to the eastern Pacific basin where it later dissipated.
- 1999 – reached Category 4 strength, threatened Bermuda before turning away.
- 2005 – made landfall near Tampico, Mexico.
- 2011 – formed in the open ocean, passed close to Bermuda, brushing the island with light rainfall.
- 2017 – a Category 2 hurricane that did not cause any impact on land.
- 2023 – regenerated back into a tropical storm almost two weeks after dissipating.

- Gertie

- 1964 – a tropical cyclone formed in the coral sea.
- 1971† – a Category 2 tropical cyclone that made landfall Queensland.
- 1985 – a Category 2 tropical cyclone that made landfall Western Australia.
- 1995† – a Category 3 severe tropical cyclone that affected Northern Territory and Western Australia the storm did only minor damage.

- Gertrude

- 1948 – a Category 2 typhoon that made landfall Philippines and South China.
- 1973 – a Category 3 tropical cyclone that brushed eastern Rodrigues.
- 1974 – a Category 1 hurricane that minimal affected Windward Islands.

- Gezani (2026) – a deadly and destructive tropical cyclone that affected parts of Madagascar and Mozambique; particularly Toamasina as an intense tropical cyclone.
- Gil

- 1983 – the first of several tropical cyclones to affect Hawaii during the 1983.
- 1989 – a Category 1 hurricane paralleled the coast of Mexico.
- 1995 – remained over the open ocean.
- 1998 – a weak tropical storm, made landfall in Thailand as a tropical depression which caused a plane crash at Surat Thani.
- 2001 – remained over the open ocean.
- 2007 – had caused squally weather off the eastern coast of Mexico.
- 2013 – remained over the open ocean.
- 2019 – remained over the open ocean.
- 2025 – a Category 1 hurricane that did not affect land

- Gilbert (1988)† – was the second most intense tropical cyclone on record in the Atlantic basin in terms of barometric pressure, only behind Hurricane Wilma in 2005.
- Gilda

- 1952 – weak tropical storm that struck China.
- 1954 – strong tropical storm that caused 29 deaths in Honduras before striking Belize.
- 1956 – attained super typhoon status and made landfall on Taiwan.
- 1959 – super typhoon which moved across central Philippines, causing 23 deaths and leaving 60,000 homeless.
- 1962 – remained over open waters before becoming extratropical east of Japan.
- 1965 – formed well east of the Philippines, weakens, and later becomes a strong tropical storm before moving ashore and dissipating over China.
- 1967 – super typhoon which eventually strikes Taiwan as a minimal typhoon
- 1971 – formed over the Philippines and dissipates over China.
- 1973 – first tropical cyclone on record to transition into a subtropical cyclone; caused six deaths in Jamaica and minor damage in Cuba, the Bahamas, and Florida.
- 1974 – brought heavy rainfall to South Korea and Japan, causing 128 deaths and $1.5 billion in damage.
- 1977 (February) – remained over open waters.
- 1977 (October) – remained over open waters, passing to the east of Japan.

- Gillian

- 1970 – a Category 1 tropical cyclone, that did not affect land.
- 1997 – a Category 1 tropical cyclone that made landfall Queensland as tropical depression.
- 2014 – a Category 5 severe tropical cyclone that affected northern Australia with gusty winds and some rainfall, while on the Indonesian island of Java, it produced strong waves.

- Gilma

- 1978 – a Category 3 hurricane.
- 1982 – a Category 3 hurricane, which passed south of Hawaii.
- 1988 – a tropical storm, which made landfall on Hawaii as a tropical depression.
- 1994 – a Category 5 hurricane; strongest of its season.
- 2000 – a Category 1 hurricane, that did not affect land.
- 2006 – a weak tropical storm.
- 2012 – a Category 1 hurricane that never affected land.
- 2018 – a weak and short-lived tropical storm.
- 2024 – a Category 4 hurricane that stayed at sea.

- Gina

- 1960 – late-season storm that remained out to sea.
- 1962 – a weak tropical storm that bought impacts to Madagascar and Mozambique.
- 1968 – remained out to sea.
- 1989 – a weak storm that impacted Samoa.
- 2003 – an off-season Category 3 severe tropical cyclone that affected the Solomon Islands.
- 2022 – a weak off-season storm that affected Vanuatu and New Caledonia.

- Ginger

- 1967 – an earlier storm of the same name.
- 1971 – was the second longest-lasting Atlantic hurricane on record.
- 1997 – a Category 5 typhoon, remained over the open ocean.

- Ginny

- 1946 – remained over the open ocean.
- 1963 – was the second strongest tropical cyclone to make landfall in Canada, only behind Hurricane Fiona of 2022, as well as the latest hurricane on a calendar year to affect the U.S. state of Maine.

- Gino (2013) – a Category 2 tropical cyclone, remained over the open ocean.
- Giovanna (2012) – a powerful tropical cyclone that affected Madagascar.
- Gladys

- 1947 – remained over the open ocean.
- 1955 – a Category 1 hurricane that hit Mexico.
- 1964 – a tropical cyclone that caused minor impact along the East Coast of the United States, Bermuda, and Atlantic Canada.
- 1968 – hit Cuba, Florida and Nova Scotia.
- 1975 – the farthest tropical cyclone from the United States to be observed by radar in the Atlantic basin since Hurricane Carla in 1961.
- 1976 – a weak tropical storm that affected Madagascar and Mozambique.
- 1991 – Struck Japan and South Korea.
- 1994 – Struck Taiwan.

- Glenda

- 1963 – stayed at sea.
- 1965 – remained over the open ocean.
- 1967 – large waves NSW Coast extreme beach erosion.
- 1969 – a Category 1 hurricane that made its way to Baja California.
- 1973 – remained over the open ocean.
- 1977 – did not make landfall.
- 2006 (March)† – a Category 5 severe tropical cyclone that made landfall in Western Australia.
- 2006 (July) – struck Taiwan and China.
- 2010 – a strong tropical cyclone that moved along Okinawa, Japan and west coast of the Korean Peninsula before striking the Seoul Metropolitan Area in early-September 2010.
- 2014† – a Category 5 super typhoon that impacted the Philippines and China.
- 2015 – did not make landfall.

- Gloria

- 1949 – most intense and destructive typhoons of the 1949 season.
- 1952 – a powerful typhoon made landfall Philippines and Vietnam.
- 1957 – struck the Philippines and Hong Kong.
- 1960 – Japan Meteorological Agency analyzed it as a tropical depression, not as a tropical storm.
- 1963 – struck Taiwan and eastern China.
- 1965 – Japan Meteorological Agency analyzed it as a tropical depression, not as a tropical storm.
- 1968 –
- 1971 – Japan Meteorological Agency analyzed it as a tropical depression, not as a tropical storm.
- 1974 –
- 1975 –
- 1976 – remained out at sea.
- 1978 –
- 1979 – a minor hurricane that stayed out to sea.
- 1980 –
- 1985† – grazed North Carolina and struck Long Island and Connecticut, causing $900 million in damage and eight deaths.
- 1996 – hit Taiwan and China.
- 1999 – a strong tropical storm not make landfall.
- 2000 – a powerful tropical storm that hit Madagascar less than two weeks after Cyclone Leon–Eline hit the country, causing more flooding, landslides and damage.
- 2002† – a deadly and destructive Category 4 super typhoon that hit Chuuk, Federated States of Micronesia.

- Gloring

- 1964 –
- 1968 – a tropical storm that hit Luzon, Hainan, and Vietnam.
- 1972 – a strong Category 5 super typhoon that made landfall in China as a weakening system, caused 377 direct and indirect fatalities.
- 1976 –
- 1980 – struck Luzon.
- 1984 – tropical Depression 09W was originally named Edeng by the PAGASA, but developed a new circulation center and was renamed Gloring.
- 1988 –
- 1992 – an early-season Category 4 typhoon that hit Japan, caused 13 fatalities with 7 people missing.
- 1996 – brushed the Philippines and made landfall in China, caused 23 deaths and $20 million in damages.
- 2000 – crossed Luzon.

- Gombe (2022) – a strong tropical cyclone that affected Mozambique.
- Goni

- 2009 – a weak tropical storm made landfall South China.
- 2015 – a powerful tropical cyclone that affected much of East Asia in late August 2015.
- 2020† – made landfall as a Category 5–equivalent super typhoon on Catanduanes in the Philippines and in Vietnam as a tropical storm.

- Gonu (2007) – was an extremely powerful tropical cyclone that became the strongest cyclone on record in the Arabian Sea.
- Gonzalo

- 2014 – a powerful Category 4 hurricane that made landfall in Bermuda.
- 2020 – the earliest seventh named storm on record, becoming a moderate tropical storm before weakening and hitting Trinidad and Tobago as a tropical depression.
- 2026 – a disorganized and short-lived tropical storm that tracked through Cape Verde.

- Gordon

- 1979 (January)† – a Category 3 severe tropical cyclone that affected Vanuatu and New Caledonia.
- 1979 (July) – strong tropical storm which made landfall in China.
- 1982 – a category 3 typhoon with no known effects on land.
- 1985 – a weak tropical storm which made landfall in Vietnam.
- 1989 – powerful Category 5 super typhoon which crossed northern Luzon at peak intensity before making landfall southwest of Hong Kong as a strong tropical storm. 306 people were killed by Gordon, and 120,000 were left homeless in the Philippines.
- 1994 – killed 1,122 in Haiti, and 23 in other nations. Damage in the United States was $400 million, and damage in Haiti and Cuba was severe.
- 2000 – formed near Guatemala, cut across the Yucatán Peninsula and later hit Florida as a tropical storm. Killed 23 in Guatemala and one in Florida, and $10.8 million damage there (no figure for Guatemala).
- 2006 – formed in the central North Atlantic, tracked north and east while becoming a Category 3 major hurricane. Crossed the Azores as a Category 1 storm before dissipating over western Europe.
- 2012 – a strong Category 2 hurricane which passed over the eastern Azores as a Category 1.
- 2018 – formed near the Florida Keys and affected South Florida, killing two. Then made landfall west of the Alabama-Mississippi border as a strong tropical storm, causing moderate damage.
- 2024 – a tropical storm that formed near Cape Verde and dissipated in the open Atlantic without causing any damage.

- Goring

- 1965 – brushed the northern Philippines.
- 1969 – hit extreme northern Philippines.
- 1973 – struck Hainan and northern Vietnam.
- 1977 – struck the Philippines and Taiwan.
- 1981 – short-lived tropical depression only recognized by PAGASA.
- 1985 – struck China.
- 1989 – struck the Philippines and China.
- 1993 – struck the Philippines and China.
- 1997 – struck China.
- 2007 – struck China.
- 2011 – weak system that was only monitored by JMA and PAGASA.
- 2015 – developed in the Central Pacific Basin and made landfall over Kyushu.
- 2019 – a tropical depression that was only tracked by JMA and PAGASA.
- 2023† – a Category 5 super typhoon that affected northern Philippines, Hong Kong, and Macau.

- Gorio

- 2001 – a weak tropical storm made landfall Taiwan.
- 2005 – struck Ryukyu Islands and China.
- 2009 – struck southern China
- 2013 – struck the Philippines, China, Hong Kong, and Macau.
- 2017 — struck Taiwan and East China.
- 2021 - formed east of Taiwan, and passed just south of Japan.
- 2025 – a Category 2 typhoon that struck Southern Taiwan and Fujian, China.

- Goying (1971) – a Category 2 typhoon, one of the most destructive storms to strike Vietnam since 1944.
- Grace

- 1945 – approached Japan.
- 1950 – Category 1 typhoon that made landfall in South Korea as a tropical storm.
- 1954 – affected Japan.
- 1958 – Category 5 super-typhoon with 190 mph winds and a pressure of 905 mbar that moved through the Ryukyu Islands and made landfall in Zhejiang.
- 1961 – Japan Meteorological Agency analyzed it as a tropical depression, not as a tropical storm.
- 1963 – remained out at sea.
- 1964 – executed a loop before re-strengthening and eventually dissipating southeast of Japan.
- 1966 – near typhoon-force storm that did not affect land.
- 1969 – Category 2 typhoon, remained over the open ocean.
- 1972 – took an erratic track east of Luzon.
- 1975 – took an erratic track east of Luzon, eventually dissipated in the Bering Sea.
- 1984 – Category 3 severe tropical cyclone that affected Queensland.
- 1991 – Category 2 hurricane that passed 50 miles (80 km) south of Bermuda; its remnants contributed to the creation of a large and powerful nor'easter, nicknamed "The Perfect Storm".
- 1997 – formed north of Hispaniola, threatened no land.
- 2003 – made landfall in Texas.
- 2005 – Category 2 cyclone that resulted in nearly 30 in. of rainfall and $20 million in damage in Australia.
- 2009 – formed northeast of the Azores; its remnants moved inland over Wales.
- 2015 – no threat to land.
- 2021 – formed near the Leeward Islands and rapidly intensified into a Category 3 hurricane in the Bay of Campeche, before making landfall in Veracruz.

- Gracie (1959) – developed just north of Hispaniola, intensified into a Category 4 hurricane and made landfall in South Carolina.
- Graham

- 1982 – a strong tropical cyclones that affected Western Australia during late January and early February 1982.
- 1991 – a category 5 tropical cyclone, not make landfall.
- 2003† – a weak tropical storm that affected Australia during late February and early March 2003.

- Grant

- 2011 – a Category 2 tropical cyclone that affected Queensland and the Northern Territory.
- 2025 – a Category 4 tropical cyclone moving through the open waters of the Indian Ocean.

- Grasing (1964) – made landfall on the Philippines and Vietnam.
- Greg

- 1981 – churned in the open ocean.
- 1987 – paralleled the Mexican coast while remaining far offshore.
- 1993 – continuation of Atlantic Tropical Storm Bret.
- 1990 – developed in the Gulf of Carpentaria.
- 1996 – made landfall on northern Borneo in the Malaysian state of Sabah, causing over $280 million in damage (1996 USD) and 238 deaths.
- 1999 – made landfall in Baja California Sur
- 2005 – short-lived storm that remained well offshore.
- 2011 – stayed out to sea.
- 2017 (April) – developed north-east of the Cocos Islands.
- 2017 (July) – churned in the open ocean.
- 2023 – formed before crossing into the Central Pacific.

- Greta

- 1956 – Category 2 hurricane, did not directly impact land.
- 1966 – no impact on land.
- 1970 – traversed the northern Yucatán Peninsula and later made landfall near Tampico, Mexico.
- 1978† – Category 4 Hurricane, made landfall near Dangriga, Belize, crossed Guatemala and southeastern Mexico as a tropical depression, then re-intensified in the Eastern Pacific and was renamed Olivia.

- Gretchen

- 1966 – churned in the open ocean.
- 1970 – churned in the open ocean.
- 1974 – a category 2 hurricane that threatened southern Baja California, but it turned away without affecting land.

- Gretel

- 1985 – passed over the Cobourg Peninsula in the Northern Territory.
- 2020 – developed east of Queensland and soon crossed into the South Pacific cyclone region.

- Gretelle (1997) – a deadly storm that struck southeastern Madagascar in January 1997.
- Guambe (2021) – was the third tropical cyclone to make landfall in the country of Mozambique since December 2020, following Cyclone Eloise and Tropical Storm Chalane.
- Guará (2017) – a rare South Atlantic subtropical storm.
- Guchol

- 2005 – churned in the open ocean.
- 2012 – a powerful tropical cyclone which impacted Southern Japan in June 2012.
- 2017 – a weak tropical storm make landfall over Pingtan County of Fujian in China.
- 2023 - churned out of the ocean without affecting any landmass.

- Guillermo

- 1979 – a Category 1 hurricane passes through Mexico.
- 1985 – tropical storm had little impact on Southern California.
- 1991 – churned in the open ocean.
- 1997 – Category 5 hurricane ninth strongest hurricane in the Eastern Pacific.
- 2003 – churned in the open ocean.
- 2009 – churned in the open ocean.
- 2015 – churned in the open ocean.
- 2021 – churned in the open ocean.

- Guito (2014) – an area of convection over eastern Mozambique moved into the Mozambique Channel.
- Gulab (2021) – a cyclonic storm made landfall in coastal regions of Andhra Pradesh and southern Odisha, and remnants of the storm caused by devastating rainfall and landslides in Maharashtra before it regenerated as Cyclone Shaheen in Arabian Sea.
- Gundang (1993) – a weak system that stayed away from land.
- Gustav

- 1984 – short-lived storm near Bermuda
- 1990 – Category 3 hurricane that neared the Lesser Antilles
- 1996 – formed in the middle of the ocean without affecting land.
- 2002 – Category 2 hurricane that brushed North Carolina and later Nova Scotia and Newfoundland
- 2008† – strong Category 4 hurricane that caused over $6 billion in damage and 138 deaths in the Greater Antillies and the Gulf Coast region of the United States.

- Gwen

- 1947 – a Category 3 typhoon that minimal impact Japan.
- 1960 – remained over the open ocean.
- 1967 – a tropical cyclone.
- 1968 – remained over the open ocean
- 1972 – Category 3 hurricane, made landfall north of San Diego, California, as a depression.
- 1976 – remained over the open ocean.
- 1978 – a Category 2 tropical cyclone that made landfall Queensland.

- Gwenda

- 1974 – a category 2 tropical cyclone made landfall Western Australia.
- 1988 – remained over the open ocean.
- 1999† – Category 5 severe tropical cyclone (Australian scale), made landfall along the Pilbara coast.

- Gyan (1981)† – a Category 4 severe tropical cyclone that affected Vanuatu and New Caledonia.

== See also ==
- Tropical cyclone
- Tropical cyclone naming
- European windstorm names
- Atlantic hurricane season
- List of Pacific hurricane seasons
- South Atlantic tropical cyclone
