= List of storms named Gary =

The name Gary or Garry has been used for three tropical cyclones worldwide: two in the Western Pacific Ocean, and one in the South Pacific Ocean:

== Western Pacific ==
- Tropical Storm Gary (1992) (T9207, 07W, Ditang)
- Tropical Storm Gary (1995) (T9504, 07W)

Preceded by Faye	Pacific typhoon season names Gary	Succeeded by Helen

== South Pacific ==
- Cyclone Garry (2013) (09F)
