= List of storms named Gloria =

The name Gloria has been used for eighteen tropical cyclones worldwide: three in the Atlantic Ocean, two in the Australian region, one in the South-West Indian Ocean, and twelve in the West Pacific Ocean. Gloria has also been used for one European windstorm.

In the Atlantic:

- Hurricane Gloria (1976) – remained out at sea.
- Hurricane Gloria (1979) – a minor hurricane that stayed out to sea.
- Hurricane Gloria (1985) – grazed North Carolina and struck Long Island and Connecticut, causing $900 million in damage and eight deaths.

The name Gloria was retired after the 1985 season, and was replaced by Grace in the 1991 Atlantic hurricane season.

In the Australian region:

- Cyclone Gloria (1975)
- Cyclone Doris-Gloria (1980)

In the South-West Indian:

- Cyclone Gloria (2000) (15S)

In the West Pacific:

- Typhoon Gloria (1949) (T4905)
- Typhoon Gloria (1952) (T5226)
- Typhoon Gloria (1957) (T5715) – struck the Philippines and Hong Kong.
- Tropical Storm Gloria (1960) (35W) – Japan Meteorological Agency analyzed it as a tropical depression, not as a tropical storm.
- Typhoon Gloria (1963) (T6314, 29W, Oniang) – struck Taiwan and eastern China.
- Tropical Storm Gloria (1965) (40W) – Japan Meteorological Agency analyzed it as a tropical depression, not as a tropical storm.
- Typhoon Gloria (1968) (T6819, 24W, Osang)
- Tropical Storm Gloria (1971) (35W) – Japan Meteorological Agency analyzed it as a tropical depression, not as a tropical storm.
- Typhoon Gloria (1974) (T7428, 32W, Aning)
- Tropical Storm Gloria (1978) (T7816, 17W, Norming)
- Typhoon Gloria (1996) (T9608, 09W) – hit Taiwan and China.
- Typhoon Gloria (1999) (T9922, 30W, Trining)
- Typhoon Chataan (2002) (T0206, 08W, Gloria) – a deadly and destructive Category 4 super typhoon that hit Chuuk, Federated States of Micronesia.

In Europe:

- Storm Gloria (2020) – brought severe flooding to southern and eastern Spain, killing at least 13 people.
