= List of storms named Gading =

The name Gading was used for nine tropical cyclones in the Philippines by PAGASA (and its predecessor, the Philippine Weather Bureau) in the Western Pacific Ocean.

- Tropical Storm Lola (1966) (T6605, 05W, Gading) – struck the Philippines and southern China as a relatively strong tropical storm.
- Tropical Depression 07W (1970) (07W, Gading) – a system that was considered by JMA as a tropical depression and by JTWC as a tropical storm; hit Taiwan and southeastern China.
- Tropical Storm Harriet (1974) (T7409, 10W, Gading) – a tropical storm which did not affect land.
- Tropical Depression Gading (1978) – a minimal tropical depression which affected Taiwan.
- Tropical Depression Gading (1982) – another short-lived tropical depression that was only tracked by PAGASA.
- Typhoon Peggy (1986) (T8607, 07W, Gading) – the strongest tropical cyclone in 1986 and one of the most intense typhoons recorded; struck the Philippines and China causing widespread destruction, killing 422.
- Typhoon Yancy (1990) (T9012, 13W, Gading) – relatively strong typhoon which made landfall the Philippines, Taiwan and mainland China, claiming at least 284 lives.
- Tropical Storm Sharon (1994) (T9404, 06W, Gading) – a tropical storm that produced flooding in the Philippines and China together with Severe Tropical Storm Russ, causing at least 13 fatalities but reportedly killing as many as 1,400 people.
- Typhoon Vicki (1998) (T9807, 11W, Gading) – a fairly strong typhoon which had a northeastward track and struck the Philippines and Japan, killing a total of 108 people, mostly from the capsizing of the MV Princess of the Orient.
