= List of storms named Gening =

The name Gening has been used to name 10 tropical cyclones within the Philippine Area of Responsibility by the PAGASA and its predecessor, the Philippine Weather Bureau, in the Western Pacific Ocean.

- Tropical Depression Gening (1963) – a tropical depression that did not significantly affect land.
- Typhoon Anita (1967) (T6706, 06W, Gening) – possibly caused Thai Airways International Flight 601 to crash.
- Tropical Storm Carla (1971) (T7107, 07W, Gening) – did not significantly affect land.
- Tropical Storm Viola (1975) (T7509, 11W, Gening) – moved away from the Philippines.
- Tropical Storm Faye (1979)
- Tropical Storm Dom (1983) (T8307, 08W, Gening) – did not significantly affect land.
- Typhoon Wynne (1987) (T8707, 07W, Gening) – a Category 4 typhoon that affected Japan.
- Typhoon Amy (1991) (T9107, 07W, Gening) – struck the Philippines, Taiwan, Hong Kong, and China, causing 136 deaths.
- Typhoon Kent (1995) (T9508, 12W, Gening) – caused 52 deaths across the Philippines, Taiwan, and China.
- Tropical Depression Gening (1999)

The name Gening was later included in the revised list of tropical cyclone names, albeit being relegated to the auxiliary list for List III (first used in 2003).
