= List of storms named Georgia =

The name Georgia has been used for eleven tropical cyclones in the Northwestern Pacific Ocean.

- Typhoon Georgia (1951) – a powerful typhoon that had little impact on the Marshall Islands.
- Typhoon Georgia (1955) – a powerful category 4 typhoon that passed the southern coast of Japan.
- Typhoon Georgia (1959) – made landfall in Japan and in Russia (then the Soviet Union)
- Typhoon Georgia (1962) – passed east of Japan
- Tropical Storm Georgia (1964) – a weak tropical storm that affected the Philippines and Indochina.
- Tropical Storm Georgia (1967) (12W, Luding) – did not make landfall.
- Typhoon Georgia (1970) (17W, Pitang) – a category 5 super typhoon made landfall on Luzon and in China
- Typhoon Georgia (1973) (8W) – a strong typhoon that made landfall South China.
- Tropical Storm Georgia (1976) (19W) – moved north away from land.
- Tropical Storm Georgia (1980) (Edeng) – made landfall on China.
- Typhoon Georgia (1983) (Luding) – made landfall on Hainan and in Vietnam
- Tropical Storm Georgia (1986) (Ruping) – crossed the Philippines and mad landfall in Vietnam

In the South-West Indian Ocean:

- Tropical Storm Georgia (1978) – a weak tropical storm that made landfall Madagascar.
