= List of storms named Gerald =

The name Gerald was used for three tropical cyclones in the Northwestern Pacific Ocean:

- Tropical Storm Gerald (1981) (T8102, 02W) – churned in the open ocean.
- Tropical Storm Gerald (1984) (T8410, 11W, Huaning) – a strong tropical storm, made landfall east-northeast of Hong Kong as a tropical depression.
- Typhoon Gerald (1987) (T8714, 14W, Neneng) – a Category 3 typhoon that affected the Philippines, Taiwan, and China.
