= List of storms named Garry =

The name Garry, or Gary, has been used for three tropical cyclones worldwide: two in the Western Pacific Ocean and one in the South Pacific Ocean.

In the Western Pacific:

- Tropical Storm Gary (1992) (T9207, 07W, Ditang) – a severe tropical storm that made landfall Philippines and South China.
- Tropical Storm Gary (1995) (T9504, 07W) – a severe tropical storm that made landfall South China.

In the South Pacific Ocean:

- Cyclone Garry (2013) – a Category 3 severe tropical cyclone that did not affect land.
