= List of storms named Gilda =

The name Gilda has been used for 13 tropical cyclones worldwide. Three of them occurred in the Atlantic Ocean, nine in the West Pacific Ocean, and one in the South-West Indian Ocean.

In the Atlantic:

- Tropical Storm Gilda (1954) – caused 29 fatalities in Honduras before making landfall in Belize and Mexico
- Tropical Storm Gilda (1973) – the first documented tropical cyclone on record to transition into a subtropical cyclone

In the West Pacific:

- Tropical Storm Gilda (1952) (T5205)
- Typhoon Gilda (1956) (T5614) – a Category 5-equivalent super typhoon that made landfall on Taiwan and in Fujian
- Typhoon Gilda (1959) (T5922, 56W) – a Category 5-equivalent super typhoon that made landfall in the Philippines, causing 23 fatalities, and Vietnam
- Typhoon Gilda (1962) (T6224, 74W) – a Category 4-equivalent typhoon that engaged in a Fujiwhara interaction with Typhoon Ivy, absorbing the latter
- Tropical Storm Gilda (1965) (T6512, 15W, Narsing) – a severe tropical storm
- Typhoon Gilda (1967) (T6737, 39W) – a Category 4-equivalent super typhoon
- Typhoon Gilda (1971) (T7111, 11W, Mameng) – a Category 2-equivalent typhoon that affected the Philippines
- Typhoon Gilda (1974) (T7408, 09W, Deling) – a Category 2-equivalent typhoon that caused 145 fatalities across Japan and South Korea
- Typhoon Gilda (1977) (T7714, 15W) – a Category 1-equivalent typhoon that did not affect land

In the South-West Indian:

- Tropical Depression Gilda (1977)
