= List of storms named Gavin =

The name Gavin has been used for two tropical cyclones in the South Pacific region of the Southern Hemisphere:

- Cyclone Gavin (1985) – a Category 2 tropical cyclone to impact Fiji, as well as the fourth to impact Vanuatu, during the 1984-85.
- Cyclone Gavin (1997) – a Category 4 severe tropical cyclone tropical cyclone to affect Fiji and was the first of three tropical cyclones to affect the island nations of Tuvalu and Wallis and Futuna.

The WMO retired the name Gavin from use in the South Pacific basin following the 1996–97 cyclone season.
