= List of storms named Gloring =

The name Gloring has been used to name ten tropical cyclones in the Philippine Area of Responsibility by the PAGASA and its predecessor, the Philippine Weather Bureau, in the West Pacific Ocean:

- Tropical Depression Gloring (1964)
- Tropical Storm Rose (1968) (T6808, 12W, Gloring) – a tropical storm that hit Luzon, Hainan, and Vietnam.
- Typhoon Rita (1972) (T7207, 08W, Gloring) – a strong Category 5 super typhoon that made landfall in China as a weakening system, caused 377 direct and indirect fatalities.
- Tropical Depression Gloring (1976)
- Severe Tropical Storm Forrest (T8004, 05W, Gloring) – struck Luzon.
- Tropical Depression 09W (1984) (09W, Edeng-Gloring) – Tropical Depression 09W was originally named Edeng by the PAGASA, but developed a new circulation center and was renamed Gloring.
- Tropical Depression Gloring (1988)
- Typhoon Janis (T9210, 10W, Gloring) – an early-season Category 4 typhoon that hit Japan, caused 13 fatalities with 7 people missing.
- Typhoon Gloria (1996) (T9607, 09W, Gloring) – brushed the Philippines and made landfall in China, caused 23 deaths and $20 million in damages.
- Tropical Depression 07W (2000) (07W, Gloring) – crossed Luzon.

After the 2000 Pacific typhoon season, the PAGASA revised their naming lists, and the name Gloring was excluded.
