= List of storms named Gillian =

The name Gillian has been used for three tropical cyclones worldwide: two in the Australian region and one in the South Pacific Ocean.

In the Australian Region:

- Cyclone Gillian (1997) – a Category 1 tropical cyclone that made landfall Queensland as tropical depression.
- Cyclone Gillian (2014) – a Category 5 severe tropical cyclone that affected northern Australia with gusty winds and some rainfall, while on the Indonesian island of Java, it produced strong waves.

In the South Pacific Ocean:

- Cyclone Gillian (1970) – a Category 1 tropical cyclone, that did not affect land.
