= List of storms named Greg =

The name Greg has been used for eleven tropical cyclones worldwide: eight in the Eastern Pacific Ocean, two in the Australian region, and one in the Western Pacific.

In the Eastern Pacific:

- Hurricane Greg (1981) – churned in the open ocean
- Hurricane Greg (1987) – paralleled the Mexican coast while remaining far offshore
- Hurricane Greg (1993) – formed from the remnants of Atlantic Tropical Storm Bret
- Hurricane Greg (1999) – made landfall in Baja California Sur
- Tropical Storm Greg (2005) – short-lived storm that remained well offshore
- Hurricane Greg (2011) – stayed out to sea
- Tropical Storm Greg (2017) – churned in the open ocean
- Tropical Storm Greg (2023) – formed before crossing into the Central Pacific

In the Australian region:

- Cyclone Greg (1990) – developed in the Gulf of Carpentaria
- Cyclone Greg (2017) (30U) – developed north-east of the Cocos Islands

In the Western Pacific:

- Tropical Storm Greg (1996) (43W) – made landfall on northern Borneo in the Malaysian state of Sabah, causing over $280 million in damage (1996 USD) and 238 deaths
