= List of storms named Gwenda =

The name Gwenda has been used for three tropical cyclones in the Australian region.

- Cyclone Fiona-Gwenda (1974) – a category 2 tropical cyclone made landfall Western Australia.
- Cyclone Gwenda (1988) – remained over the open ocean.
- Cyclone Gwenda (1999) – Category 5 severe tropical cyclone (Australian scale), made landfall along the Pilbara coast.

The name Gwenda was retired in the Australian region following the 1998–99 cyclone season.
