= List of storms named Gertie =

The name Gertie has been used for four tropical cyclones in the Australian region:

- Cyclone Gertie (1964)
- Cyclone Gertie (1971) – a Category 2 tropical cyclone that made landfall in Queensland.
- Cyclone Gertie (1985) – a Category 2 tropical cyclone that made landfall in Western Australia.
- Cyclone Gertie (1995) – a Category 3 severe tropical cyclone that affected Northern Territory and Western Australia; the storm did only minor damage.
