= List of storms named Ginger =

The name Ginger has been used for three tropical cyclones worldwide: two in the Atlantic Ocean and one in the Western Pacific.

In the Atlantic Ocean:

- Tropical Storm Ginger (1967) – an earlier storm of the same name.
- Hurricane Ginger (1971) – was the second longest-lasting Atlantic hurricane on record

In the Western Pacific:

- Typhoon Ginger (1997) – a Category 5 typhoon, remained over the open ocean.
