= List of storms named Ginny =

The name Ginny has been used for two tropical cyclones worldwide: one in the Atlantic Ocean and one in the Western Pacific.

In the Atlantic Ocean:

- Hurricane Ginny (1963) – an erratic Category 2 hurricane that paralleled the East Coast of the United States before making landfall in Nova Scotia at near-peak strength

In the Western Pacific:

- Typhoon Ginny (1946) – remained over the open ocean
