= List of storms named Grant =

The name Grant has been used for two tropical cyclones in the Australian region.

- Cyclone Grant (2011) – a Category 2 tropical cyclone that affected Queensland and the Northern Territory.
- Cyclone Grant (2025) – a powerful and long-lived Category 4 tropical cyclone that churned in the open waters of the Indian Ocean.
