= List of storms named Gilma =

The name Gilma has been used for nine tropical cyclones in the East Pacific Ocean:

- Hurricane Gilma (1978) – a Category 3 hurricane that did not affect land
- Hurricane Gilma (1982) – a Category 3 hurricane
- Tropical Storm Gilma (1988) – affected Hawaii
- Hurricane Gilma (1994) – a Category 5 hurricane that affected Johnston Atoll
- Hurricane Gilma (2000) – a Category 1 hurricane that did not affect land
- Tropical Storm Gilma (2006) – did not affect land
- Hurricane Gilma (2012) – a Category 1 hurricane that did not affect land
- Tropical Storm Gilma (2018) – did not affect land
- Hurricane Gilma (2024) – a Category 4 hurricane that affected Hawaii
