= List of storms named Garding =

The name Garding was used for two tropical cyclones in the Philippines by PAGASA in the Western Pacific Ocean.

- Tropical Depression 63W (1978) (63W, Garding) – a relatively long-lived late-season tropical depression that was monitored by JMA, JTWC and PAGASA.
- Typhoon Axel (1994) (T9435, 38W, Garding) – a strong late-season typhoon which affected central Philippines, claiming at least 19 lives.
