= List of storms named Gina =

The name Gina has been used for six tropical cyclones worldwide.

In the South Pacific Ocean:

- Cyclone Gina (1960) – remained out to sea.
- Cyclone Gina (1989) – impacted Samoa.
- Cyclone Gina (2003) – an off-season Category 3 severe tropical cyclone that affected the Solomon Islands.
- Cyclone Gina (2022) – an off-season storm that affected Vanuatu and New Caledonia.

In the Australian region:

- Cyclone Gina (1968) – remained out to sea.

In the South-West Indian Ocean:

- Tropical Storm Gina (1962) – brought impacts to Madagascar and Mozambique.

== See also ==
- Cyclone Gita (2018) – a South Pacific tropical cyclone with a similar name.
