= List of storms named Graham =

The name Graham has been used for three tropical cyclones in the Australian region of the Southern Hemisphere.

- Cyclone Graham (1982) – a strong tropical cyclones that affected Western Australia during late January and early February 1982.
- Cyclone Graham (1991) – a category 5 tropical cyclone, not made landfall.
- Cyclone Graham (2003) – a weak tropical storm that affected Australia during late February and early March 2003.
