= List of storms named Gerda =

The name Gerda has been used for four tropical cyclones worldwide: three in the Atlantic Ocean ocean and one in the South West Indian Ocean:

In the Atlantic Ocean:

- Tropical Storm Gerda (1958) – a strong tropical storm that affected the Caribbean and then crashed onto the coasts of Mexico and Texas.
- Tropical Storm Gerda (1961) – a powerful tropical storm that struck Cuba and the Bahamas and affected New England as an extratropical cyclone.
- Hurricane Gerda (1969) – a Category 3 hurricane that brought light rain to southern Florida and moderate to heavy rain to eastern North Carolina and New England, causing minor damage.

In the South-West Indian Ocean

- Tropical Storm Gerda (1992) – formed off the coast of Madagascar and had minor influence on Mauritius.
