= List of storms named Gertrude =

The name Gertrude has been used for one tropical cyclones in the Atlantic Ocean, one in the western Pacific Ocean and one in the southwest Indian Ocean.

In the Atlantic Ocean:

- Hurricane Gertrude (1974) – a Category 1 hurricane that minimally affected the Windward Islands.

In the Western Pacific Ocean:

- Typhoon Gertrude (1948) – a Category 2 typhoon that made landfall Philippines and South China.

In the South-West Indian Ocean:

- Cyclone Gertrude (1973) –a Category 3 tropical cyclone that brushed eastern Rodrigues.
