= Tropical Storm Gilda (1973) =

Atlantic tropical storm in 1973

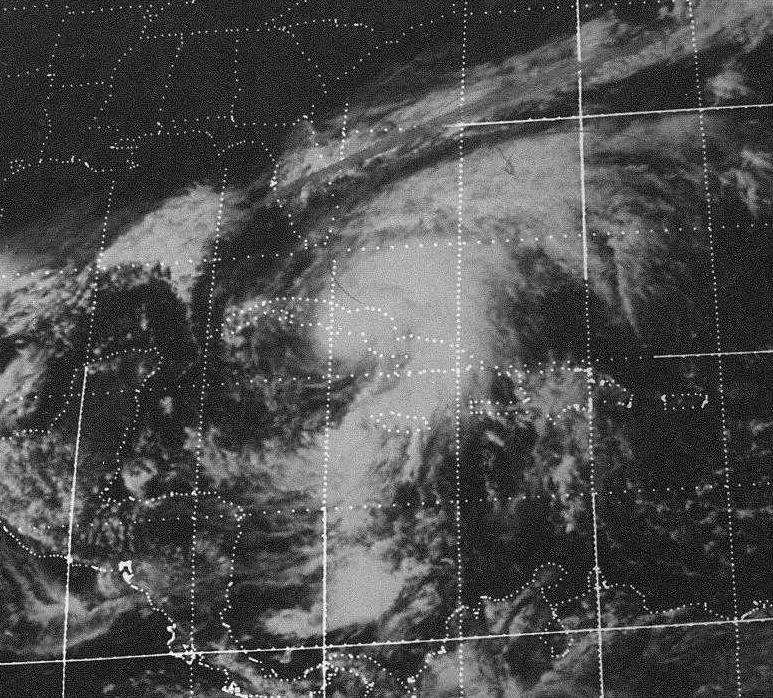
- Tropical Storm Gilda near Cuba

Meteorological history
- Formed: October 16, 1973
- Dissipated: October 27, 1973

Tropical storm
- 1-minute sustained (SSHWS/NWS)
- Highest winds: 70 mph (110 km/h)
- Lowest pressure: 984 mbar (hPa); 29.06 inHg

Overall effects
- Fatalities: 6 direct
- Areas affected: Jamaica, Cuba, Bahamas, East Coast of the United States, Atlantic Canada
- IBTrACS
- Part of the 1973 Atlantic hurricane season

Tropical Storm Gilda in 1973 was the first documented tropical cyclone on record to transition into a subtropical cyclone. It formed on October 16 in the western Caribbean Sea from a tropical wave, and strengthened to reach peak winds of 70 mph (110 km/h) before striking Cuba. It later moved slowly through the Bahamas before weakening to tropical depression status. On October 24, with the assistance of a cold front off the coast of the eastern United States, Gilda transformed into a subtropical storm, becoming very large and strong. The storm later accelerated northeastward and became extratropical, ultimately dissipating near Greenland.

The storm first brought heavy rainfall to Jamaica, causing six deaths and some damage from mudslides. While crossing Cuba and later the Bahamas, the storm caused little impact, limited to some crop damage. As a subtropical storm, Gilda brought gusty winds and high waves to much of the east coast of the United States, causing minor beach erosion and coastal property damage.

== Storm history ==
Map plotting the storm's track and intensity, according to the Saffir–Simpson scale Map key Saffir–Simpson scale Tropical depression (≤38 mph, ≤62 km/h) Tropical storm (39–73 mph, 63–118 km/h) Category 1 (74–95 mph, 119–153 km/h) Category 2 (96–110 mph, 154–177 km/h) Category 3 (111–129 mph, 178–208 km/h) Category 4 (130–156 mph, 209–251 km/h) Category 5 (≥157 mph, ≥252 km/h) Unknown Storm type Tropical cyclone Subtropical cyclone Extratropical cyclone, remnant low, tropical disturbance, or monsoon depression

On October 3, a tropical wave exited Africa and proceeded westward across the Atlantic Ocean, reaching the Caribbean Sea a week later. On October 13, convection increased and slowly organized, aided by an anticyclone that diminished wind shear across the region. On October 16, a tropical depression developed into a tropical depression about halfway between Central America and Jamaica. After its formation, the depression moved northeastward and developed rainbands. On October 18, the National Hurricane Center (NHC) upgraded the depression to Tropical Storm Gilda, located northwest of the Cayman Islands. Later that day, Gilda hit south-central Cuba with peak winds of 70 mph (110 km/h). The storm weakened crossing the island before emerging into the southwest Atlantic on October 19. There, wind shear was stronger, causing the convection to separate from the circulation.

Beginning on October 20, Gilda drifted through the central Bahamas, passing near Andros, Exuma, Cat, Eleuthera, and Harbour islands. On October 22, Gilda fell to tropical depression status. After remaining nearly stationary for a day, Gilda started accelerating northeastward due to an approaching upper-level trough. The same trough brought colder air, providing a baroclinic environment for intensifying. On October 24, Gilda transitioned into a subtropical storm, marking the first recorded instance of such a subtropical transition. Operationally, the NHC maintained Gilda as a tropical cyclone to avoid confusion. Gilda's circulation became very large, extending from New England to the Bahamas, while its center passed about halfway between Bermuda and Cape Hatteras. On October 25, the storm reached peak winds of 70 mph (110 km/h) as it moved northeastward. Two days later, Gilda attained its minimum pressure of 984 mbar (29.1 inHg), as it moved over cooler waters. Soon after, it transitioned into an extratropical cyclone southeast of the Canadian Maritimes. The remnants of Gilda passed just southeast of Newfoundland before slowing off southeastern Greenland, dissipating on October 30.

== Preparation and impact ==
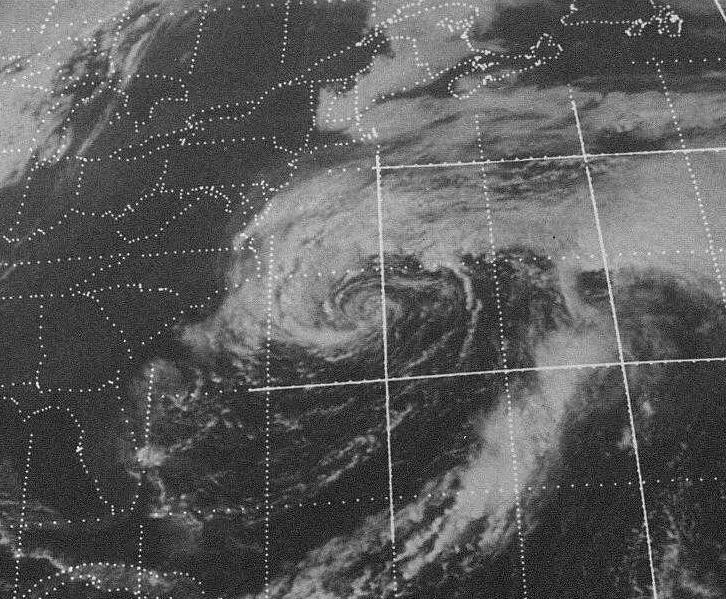
Gilda as a subtropical storm near the United States

Tropical Storm Gilda brought heavy rainfall to Jamaica over a three day period, triggering floods and landslides that killed six people. The highest 24‑hour rainfall total was 411 millimetres (16.2 in). The landslides left some roads unpassable, while in Saint Andrew Parish, six houses were destroyed. In northern Cuba, rains reached 155 mm (6.13 in) over six hours in Morón. A station in the mountains of eastern Cuba recorded sustained winds 58 mph (93 km/h) winds. The storm caused power outages and crop damage on the island. Thousands of people evacuated their homes. In the Bahamas, schools and businesses closed. The storm brought several days of heavy rains and high tides, causing crop damage on several islands. Wind gusts peaked at 75 mph (120 km/h) on Golden Cay.

The storm led to gale warnings for southeastern Florida from North Key Largo to Fort Lauderdale, and later from Cape Hatteras, North Carolina to the mouth of the Merrimack River in Massachusetts. Rough seas caused coastal property damage and beach erosion from Florida to Cape Hatteras. Gale-force winds were observed from North Carolina to New Jersey. Around the time of Gilda becoming extratropical, Sable Island off the coast of Nova Scotia recorded a wind gust of 74 mph (119 km/h).

== See also ==
- Other tropical cyclones named Gilda
