= List of storms named Gail =

The name Gail has been used for three tropical cyclones worldwide: one in the Atlantic Ocean, one in the Australian Region and one in the South West Indian Ocean.

In the Atlantic Ocean:

- Hurricane Gail (1953) – a Category 1 hurricane moving through the open waters of the Atlantic Ocean.

In the Australian Region:

- Cyclone Gail (1972) – a Category 4 severe tropical cyclone that affected New Caledonia and Vanuatu.

In the South-West Indian Ocean:

- Cyclone Gail (1995) – a Category 1 tropical cyclone that affected the island of Rodrigues.
