= Cyclone Gavin (1985) =

Category 2 South Pacific cyclone in 1985

Tropical Cyclone Gavin
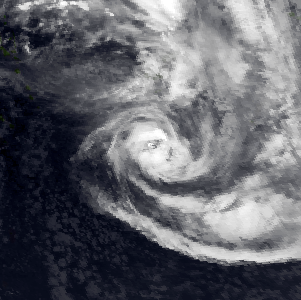
- Satellite image of Tropical Cyclone Gavin near its peak intensity

Meteorological history
- Formed: 2 March 1985
- Dissipated: 9 March 1985

Category 2 tropical cyclone
- 10-minute sustained (MetService)
- Highest winds: 95 km/h (60 mph)
- Lowest pressure: 985 hPa (mbar); 29.09 inHg

Tropical storm
- 1-minute sustained (SSHWS/JTWC)
- Highest winds: 100 km/h (65 mph)
- Lowest pressure: 987 hPa (mbar); 29.15 inHg

Overall effects
- Fatalities: 3
- Damage: FJ$1 million
- Areas affected: Vanuatu, Fiji
- Part of the 1984-85 South Pacific cyclone season

Tropical Cyclone Gavin was the third named tropical cyclone to impact Fiji, as well as the fourth to impact Vanuatu, during the 1984-85 South Pacific cyclone season. The system was first noted as a tropical depression during 2 March, while it was located within a monsoon trough of low pressure in between Espiritu Santo and Rotuma. Over the next couple of days the system gradually developed further, before it was classified as a tropical cyclone and named Gavin during 4 March.

== Meteorological history ==
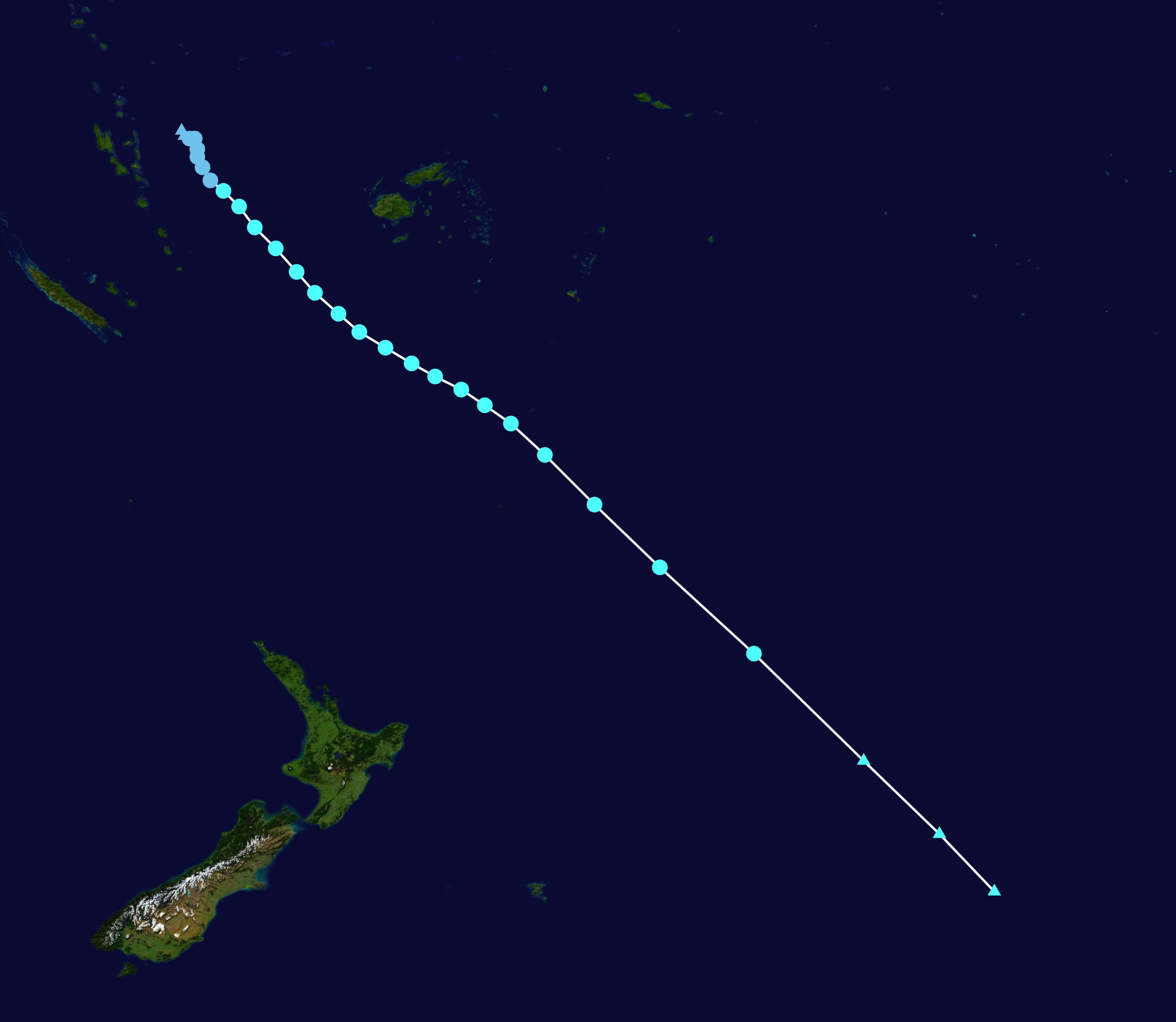
Map plotting the storm's track and intensity, according to the Saffir–Simpson scale Map key Saffir–Simpson scale Tropical depression (≤38 mph, ≤62 km/h) Tropical storm (39–73 mph, 63–118 km/h) Category 1 (74–95 mph, 119–153 km/h) Category 2 (96–110 mph, 154–177 km/h) Category 3 (111–129 mph, 178–208 km/h) Category 4 (130–156 mph, 209–251 km/h) Category 5 (≥157 mph, ≥252 km/h) Unknown Storm type Tropical cyclone Subtropical cyclone Extratropical cyclone, remnant low, tropical disturbance, or monsoon depression

During 2 March, the Fiji Meteorological Service reported that a tropical depression had developed within a monsoon trough, in between Espiritu Santo and Rotuma about 450 km (280 mi) to the northwest of Fiji. Over the next couple of days, the system gradually developed further as it moved southwards, while moderate to strong winds were recorded in Vanuatu's southern islands of Aneityum and Tanna. During 4 March, the United States Joint Typhoon Warning Center initiated advisories on the depression and designated it as Tropical Cyclone 27P, while the system was located about 300 km (185 mi) to the northeast of Port Vila in Vanuatu. Later that day the FMS named the system Gavin, after it had become equivalent to a category 1 tropical cyclone on the modern day Australian tropical cyclone intensity scale. At this time, Gavin was estimated to have an unusually large area of gale-force winds, with winds extending out to about 550 km (340 mi) in its northern semicircle and 280 km (175 mi) in its southern semicircle.

During 5 March, the system intensified slightly and attained storm-force winds as it moved south-eastwards, before the FMS reported that Gavin had peaked as a category 2 tropical cyclone with 10-minute sustained winds of 95 km/h (60 mph). Over the next couple of days, as the system moved south-eastwards brushed Fiji, there were no significant changes in Gavin's intensity, however, the wider area of gales moved into the system's semicircle. During 7 March, the JTWC reported that the system had peaked with 1-minute sustained wind speeds of 100 km/h (65 mph), before Gavin started to weaken and lose its tropical characteristics, as it accelerated south-eastwards towards higher latitudes. Later that day, the FMS handed the primary warning responsibility for the system to the New Zealand Meteorological Service (NZMS), after Gavin had moved out of their area of responsibility. During 8 March, the NZMS reported that the system had become an extratropical depression after it had lost most of its tropical characteristics, before it was last noted during the following day, while it was located about 2,100 km (1,305 mi) to the southeast of Wellington in New Zealand.

== Effects ==
Gavin was the fourth tropical cyclone to impact Vanuatu during the 1984–85 season, after Severe Tropical Cyclones Eric, Nigel and Odette had impacted the island nation during January 1985. Heavy rain and moderate to strong winds were reported in the island nation at various times between 2 and 5 March, however, there was no significant damage or effects reported in the island nation. The system was also the third named tropical cyclone to impact Fiji during the 1984-85 season, after Severe Tropical Cyclones Eric and Nigel had impacted the islands during January 1985.

=== Fiji ===
During 4 March, before the system was named the FMS issued a tropical cyclone alert for the whole of Fiji, before issuing a gale warning for the Mamanuca Islands, part of Viti Levu, as well as the islands of Vatulele, Kadavu, Ono, Dravuni and Beqa, after it had developed into a tropical cyclone. Winds of near gale force or stronger that emulated from Gavin's northerly quarter affected most parts of Fiji, for varying periods between 5 and 7 March. This included the northern and western parts of Viti Levu and islands in the Yasawa and Mamanuca Groups, where strong winds of above 45 km/h (28 mph) were recorded for around 40 hours. The wind caused relatively minor damage to various power and communication lines, relief tents, other temporary shelters, crops and vegetation. However, the majority of the damage associated with Gavin was attributed by the FMS to the prolonged heavy rainfall, after rainbands associated with the monsoon trough had started to impact the island nation during 2 March. Over the next few days, as the system intensified and moved closer, the rainfall became heavier and more widespread, with the heaviest falls occurring between 4–6 March, while the highest total of 697 mm (27.44 in) was reported in Monasavu. This heavy rain brought widespread and significant flooding to the towns of Ba, Nadi and Lautoka, as well as other low-lying areas, along the rivers of Viti Levu, including the banks of the Rewa and the Sigatoka rivers. At the height of the cyclone, seven people went missing, while local media reported that three people had died, which included two drownings and a person who was electrocuted when a tree, brought a power line down.

Unofficial estimates of the damage caused by Gavin were placed at about a $1 million Fiji dollars . Several ships were also impacted by Gavin including the Wellington Star which sustained structural and electrical damage, while the Matthew Flinders dragged its anchor and was grounded in Lautoka. About a weak, after Gavin had dissipated, a major landslide occurred in Namara village in the Yasawa Islands, which prompted the relocation of the village. The FMS subsequently speculated that the prolonged heavy rain associated with Gavin, had partially contributed to the landslide. During 10 March, a shallow tropical depression developed within the monsoon trough over Vanua Levu and moved westwards into the Pacific Ocean, where it developed into Tropical Cyclone Hina. The system subsequently moved north-westwards and impacted Vanuatu as well as the Solomon Islands, before it started to move south-westwards and impacted Fiji between 16–17 March.
