= Typhoon Gerald =

Pacific typhoon in 1987

Typhoon Gerald (Neneng)
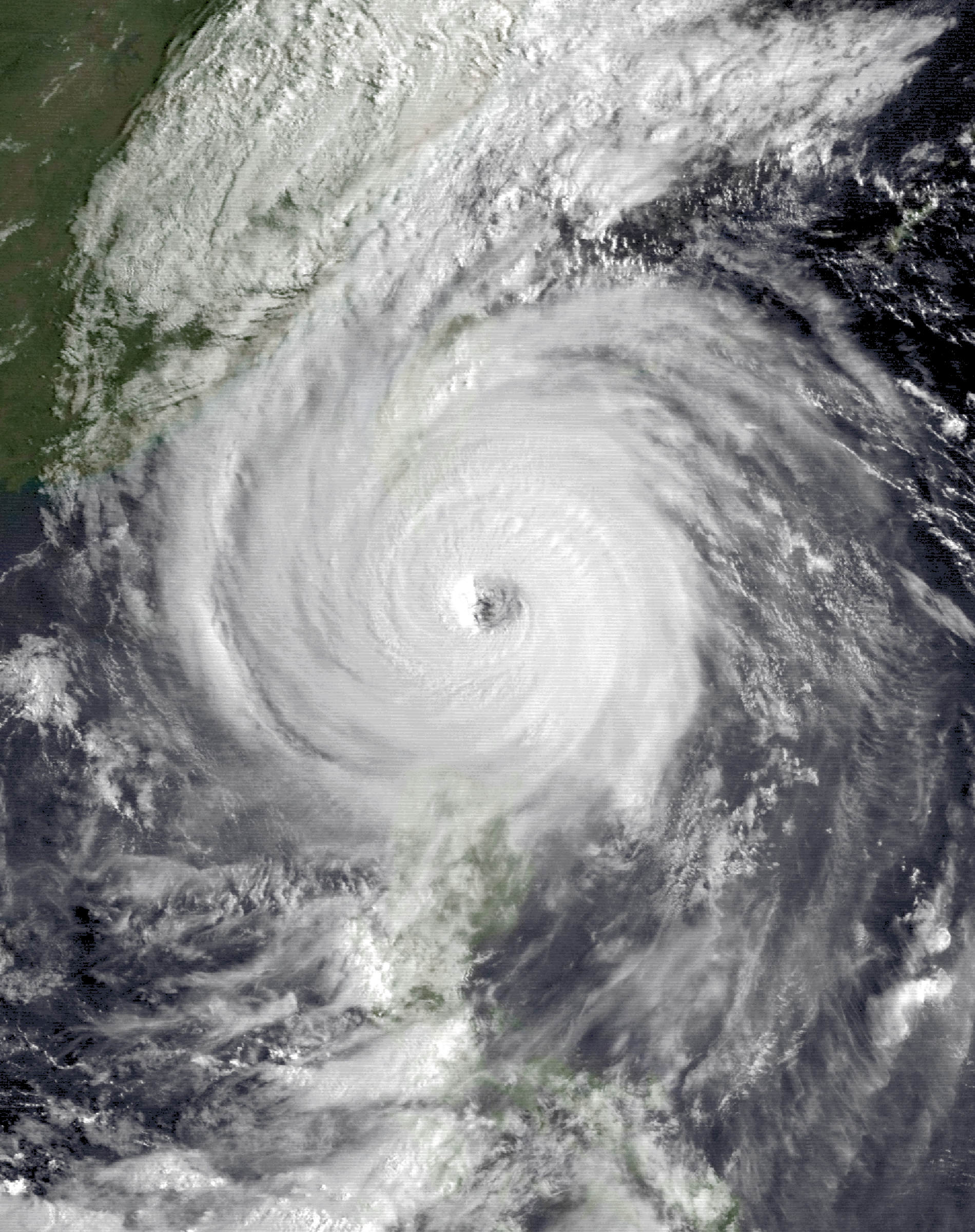
- Typhoon Gerald on September 9

Meteorological history
- Formed: September 4, 1987
- Dissipated: September 11, 1987

Typhoon
- 10-minute sustained (JMA)
- Highest winds: 150 km/h (90 mph)
- Lowest pressure: 950 hPa (mbar); 28.05 inHg

Category 3-equivalent typhoon
- 1-minute sustained (SSHWS/JTWC)
- Highest winds: 195 km/h (120 mph)
- Lowest pressure: 937 hPa (mbar); 27.67 inHg

Overall effects
- Fatalities: 127
- Damage: $134 million (1987 USD)
- Areas affected: Philippines, Taiwan, South-Central China
- IBTrACS
- Part of the 1987 Pacific typhoon season

Typhoon Gerald, known in the Philippines as Typhoon Neneng, affected the Philippines, Taiwan, and China during September 1987. A tropical depression developed on September 4, and within 24 hours, intensified into a tropical storm. After initially moving erratically within the Philippine Sea, Gerald moved west-northwest and then northwest while steadily deepening. Gerald obtained typhoon intensity on September 8, and the following day, attained maximum intensity. Shortly thereafter, the typhoon skirted southwestern Taiwan, which resulted in a steady weakening trend. On September 10, Gerald moved ashore north of Hong Kong near Amoy. Gerald dissipated the next day.

Across the Philippines, the storm caused $4.48 million (1987 USD) in damage but no deaths. Although the system stayed offshore Taiwan, the storm inflicted widespread flooding across the island that took five lives. There, 5,000 families were left without power, and damage exceeded $10 million. Although Gerald weakened considerably prior to making landfall, the storm was still responsible for extensive damage in the Fujian Province, where 76 people perished, and 31 others suffered injuries. In the neighboring Zhejiang Province, 28 people were killed and 71 others sustained injuries. Across China, 4,900 homes were destroyed and 122 fatalities were reported. Damage in the country amounted to $120 million.

== Meteorological history ==
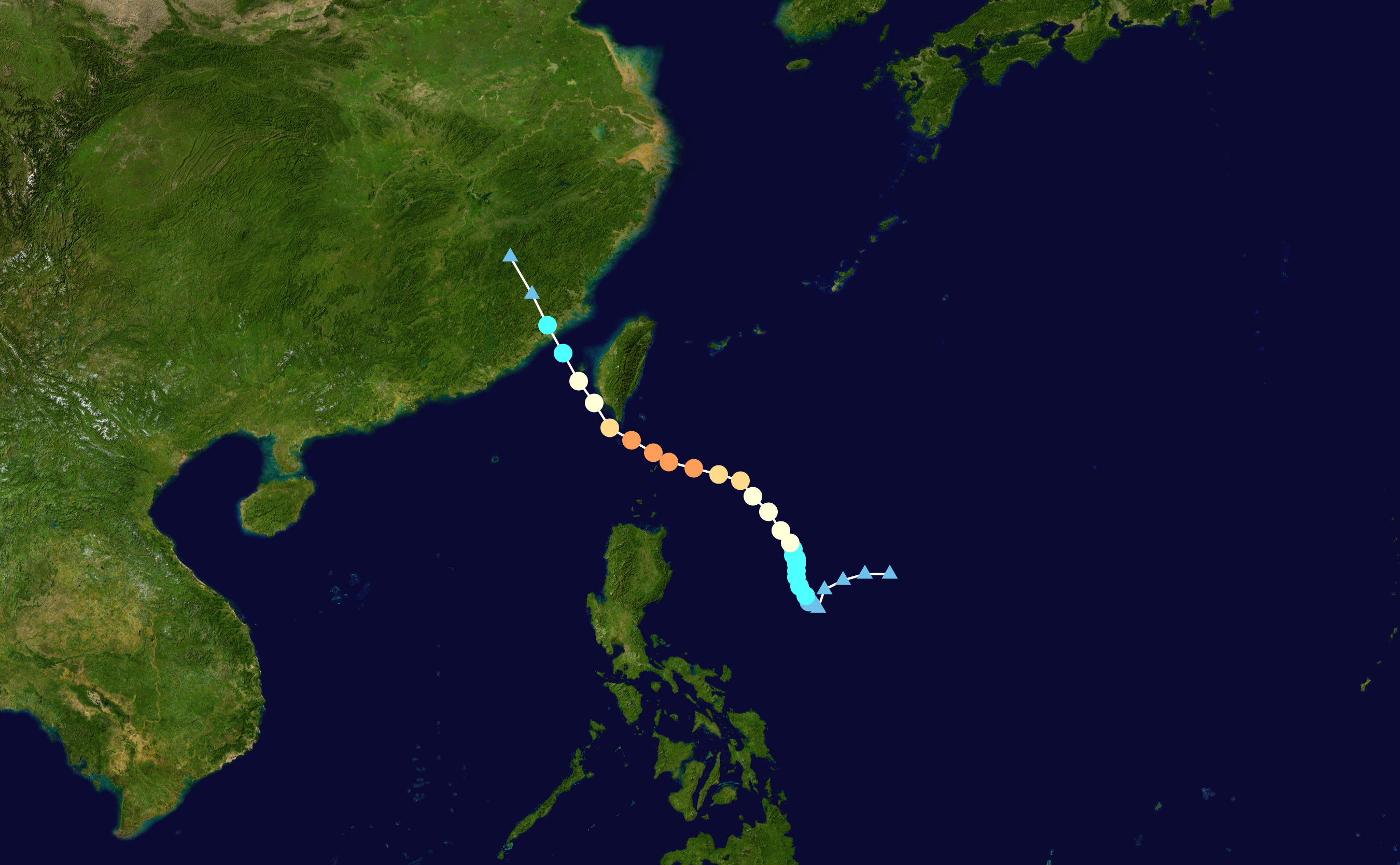
Map plotting the storm's track and intensity, according to the Saffir–Simpson scale Map key Saffir–Simpson scale Tropical depression (≤38 mph, ≤62 km/h) Tropical storm (39–73 mph, 63–118 km/h) Category 1 (74–95 mph, 119–153 km/h) Category 2 (96–110 mph, 154–177 km/h) Category 3 (111–129 mph, 178–208 km/h) Category 4 (130–156 mph, 209–251 km/h) Category 5 (≥157 mph, ≥252 km/h) Unknown Storm type Tropical cyclone Subtropical cyclone Extratropical cyclone, remnant low, tropical disturbance, or monsoon depression

Typhoon Gerald, one of three typhoons to form from the monsoon trough in early September 1987, originated from an area of low pressure that developed to the east of the Philippines over the South China Sea. The Joint Typhoon Warning Center (JTWC) started tracking the low at 06:00 UTC on September 2, after convection persisted. Two and a half hours later, the agency issued a Tropical Cyclone Formation Alert (TCFA), but almost immediately thereafter, shower and thunderstorm activity rapidly diminished due to decreased poleward outflow and increased wind shear. Despite this, the Japan Meteorological Agency (JMA) started tracking the system at 00:00 UTC on September 3. (Note: The Japan Meteorological Agency is the official Regional Specialized Meteorological Center for the western Pacific Ocean.) Eight hours later, the TCFA was cancelled.

Although the low initially exhibited features typical of a monsoon trough, surface observations suggested that surface pressures in the vicinity of the low began to fall on September 4. Consequently, the TFCA was re-issued at 10:00 UTC. Eight hours later, Dvorak intensity estimates for the storm reached T2.0/30 mph (50 km/h), prompting the JTWC to upgrade the system into a tropical depression, although post-storm analysis from the agency indicated that the system attained tropical depression status at 00:00 UTC on September 4 and tropical storm intensity at 18:00 UTC that day. At 06:00 UTC on September 5, the JMA followed suit and classified Gerald as a tropical storm. (Note: Wind estimates from the JMA and most other basins throughout the world are sustained over 10 minutes, while estimates from the United States-based Joint Typhoon Warning Center are sustained over 1 minute. 10-minute winds are about 1.14 times the amount of 1-minute winds.) Meanwhile, the Philippine Atmospheric, Geophysical and Astronomical Services Administration (PAGASA) also monitored the storm and assigned it with the local name Neneng. The JTWC initially expected Gerald to re-curve east of the Philippines; however, the storm's circulation remained quite shallow and embedded within the monsoon trough, causing Gerald to meander. The JMA upgraded Gerald into severe tropical storm during the evening hours of September 5.

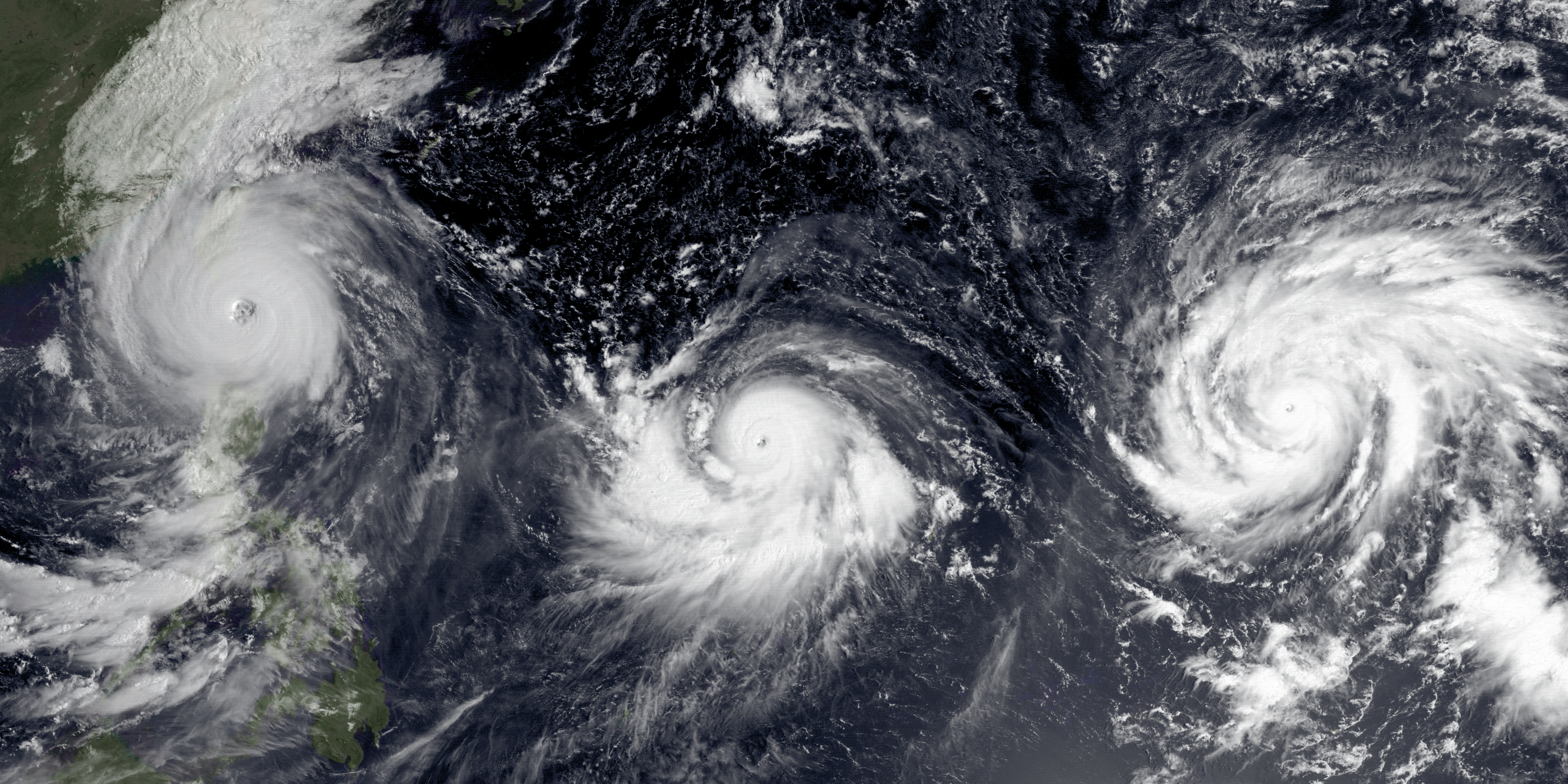
Typhoon Gerald (left), Freda (center) and Holly (right) on September 9

After meandering offshore the Philippines during the storm's formative stages, Gerald began to turn west-northwest and then north-northwest on September 7. Subsequently, the JTWC revised its forecasts, and called for Gerald to track through the Luzon Strait and eventually move into China. Gerald also started to intensify at a faster clip. At 00:00 UTC on September 7, the JTWC reported that Gerald reached typhoon intensity, with the JMA doing the same a mere 12 hours later as an eye first became evident on satellite imagery. Midday on September 8, the JTWC increased the intensity of the typhoon to 185 km/h (115 mph), equal to Category 3 intensity on the United States-based Saffir–Simpson hurricane wind scale. Several hours later, the JTWC estimated that Gerald reached its peak intensity of 195 km/h (120 mph). At the same time, the JMA indicated that Gerald attained winds of 145 km/h (90 mph), its peak intensity, and a minimum barometric pressure of 950 mbar (28 inHg). While at peak intensity, Typhoon Gerald exhibited a 110 km (70 mi) wide eye – unusually large for a tropical cyclone that season.

Shortly after its peak, Gerald began to interact with the southwestern coast of Taiwan. This greatly reduced the storm's low-level inflow, which resulted in considerable weakening. Late on September 9, Gerald passed about 20 km (12 mi) south of the southern tip of Taiwan, and early the following morning, tracked 15 km (9.3 mi) west of the island of Magong. The weakening trend persisted as the typhoon entered the Formosa Straits, and at 00:00 UTC on September 10, the JMA downgraded Gerald into a severe tropical storm. Six hours later, the JTWC reported that Gerald was no longer a typhoon. Late on September 10, Gerald made landfall less than 100 km (60 mi) northeast of Amoy. At the time of landfall, the JTWC estimated that Gerald had weakened into a tropical depression, and the JMA had stopped classifying the storm altogether. At 00:00 UTC on September 11, the JTWC ceased following the storm as it was no longer identifiable by surface observations or via satellite imagery.

== Preparations, impact, and aftermath ==
During its formative stages of the typhoon, 177 people – or 32 families – were either homeless or evacuated to shelters in the Philippines. There, damage totaled $4.48 million, with $2.52 million from public infrastructure and $1.94 million from agriculture. However, there were no casualties. (Note: All Philippine currencies are converted to United States Dollars using Philippines Measuring worth with an exchange rate of the year 1987.) Although Gerald did not make landfall in Taiwan, it came close enough to deliver heavy rains and strong winds to the island. Five people were killed. Along the eastern and southeastern coasts portion of Taiwan, roads were cut off due to falling debris and mudslides. Two young boys died due to flash flooding in the capital of Taipei. A worker at a nuclear power plant in the southern tip of the island died due to head injuries suffered during the storm. Two fishermen near Hualien drowned due to storm surge. During the height of the storm, 5,000 households lost power. Overall, five people were killed and damage exceeded $10 million.

Typhoon Gerald brought up to 510 mm (20 in) of rain to the Fujian Province, with the cities of Ningde, Fuzhou, Putian, Quanzhou, Xiamen, Zhangzhou receiving the worst damage of the storm. Throughout the province, 67 people were killed and 31 other people were injured, many seriously, while 126,610 ha (312,865 acres) of crops were damaged. Most of the casualties in the province occurred due to collapsed homes. In the neighboring province of Zhejiang, 28 others died and 71 were injured. There, the storm flooded 126,610 ha (312,865 acres) of crops and destroyed 700 homes. A highway tunnel in Huangyan County collapsed, burying at least 12 people, six of whom were rescued. Most of the district was also isolated from the outside world due to flooding along the Qiantang River. Throughout the Zhejian province, thousands of bridges, dikes and communications equipment were destroyed. Nationwide, 4,900 dwellings were demolished, 102 people sustained injuries, and 122 fatalities occurred. Damage in the country amounted to $120 million. Further south, the storm came close enough to Hong Kong to require a No 1. hurricane signal for about 23 hours starting on September 9. Citywide, the highest recorded wind gust of 87 km/h (54 mph) occurred at Tate's Cairn. The Hong Kong Royal Observatory also reported a minimum pressure of 1,000.8 mbar (29.55 inHg) while Cheung Chau received 16.5 mm (0.65 in) of rain in a five-day time span. Throughout Hong Kong, there were no deaths or damages. Following the storm, the Chinese army was mobilized to provide food and supplies to an estimated 25,400 people that were left homeless.

== See also ==
- Typhoon Hal (1985)
