= List of storms named Grace =

The name Grace has been used for nineteen tropical cyclones worldwide: six in the Atlantic Ocean, ten in the Western Pacific Ocean, two in the Australian region of the South Pacific Ocean. and one in the South-West Indian Ocean.

In the Atlantic:

- Hurricane Grace (1991) – Category 2 hurricane that passed 50 miles (80 km) south of Bermuda; its remnants contributed to the creation of a large and powerful nor'easter, nicknamed "The Perfect Storm".
- Tropical Storm Grace (1997) – formed north of Hispaniola, threatened no land.
- Tropical Storm Grace (2003) – made landfall in Texas.
- Tropical Storm Grace (2009) – formed northeast of the Azores; its remnants moved inland over Wales.
- Tropical Storm Grace (2015) – no threat to land.
- Hurricane Grace (2021) – formed near the Leeward Islands and rapidly intensified into a Category 3 hurricane in the Bay of Campeche, before making landfall in Veracruz.

In the Western Pacific:

- Tropical Storm Grace (1945) – approached Japan.
- Typhoon Grace (1950) (T5008) – Category 1 typhoon that made landfall in South Korea as a tropical storm.
- Typhoon Grace (1954) (T5405) – affected Japan.
- Super Typhoon Grace (1958) (T5819) – Category 5 super-typhoon with 190 mph winds and a pressure of 905 mbar that moved through the Ryukyu Islands and made landfall in Zhejiang.
- Tropical Storm Grace (1961) (30W) – Japan Meteorological Agency analyzed it as a tropical depression, not as a tropical storm.
- Tropical Storm Grace (1964) (T6410, 13W) – executed a loop before re-strengthening and eventually dissipating southeast of Japan.
- Tropical Storm Grace (1966) (T6623, 25W) – near typhoon-force storm that did not affect land.
- Typhoon Grace (1969) (T6913, 16W) – Category 2 typhoon, remained over the open ocean.
- Tropical Storm Grace (1972) (T7219, 19W, Osang) – took an erratic track east of Luzon.
- Tropical Storm Grace (1975) (T7517, 20W, Oniang) – took an erratic track east of Luzon, eventually dissipated in the Bering Sea.

In the Australian region:

- Cyclone Grace (1984) – Category 3 severe tropical cyclone (Australian scale) that affected Queensland.
- Cyclone Grace (2004) – Category 2 cyclone (Australian scale) that resulted in nearly 30 in. of rainfall and $20 million in damage in Australia.

In the South-West Indian:

- Cyclone Grace (1963) – remained out at sea.

== See also ==
- Hurricane Gracie, a 1959 Atlantic tropical cyclone with a similar name.
