= Thai Airways International Flight 601 =

1967 aviation accident

- Wreckage of Flight 601

Accident
- Date: 30 June 1967
- Summary: Controlled flight into terrain due to pilot error and bad weather
- Site: Near Kai Tak Airport, British Hong Kong; 22°18′07″N 114°13′02″E

Aircraft
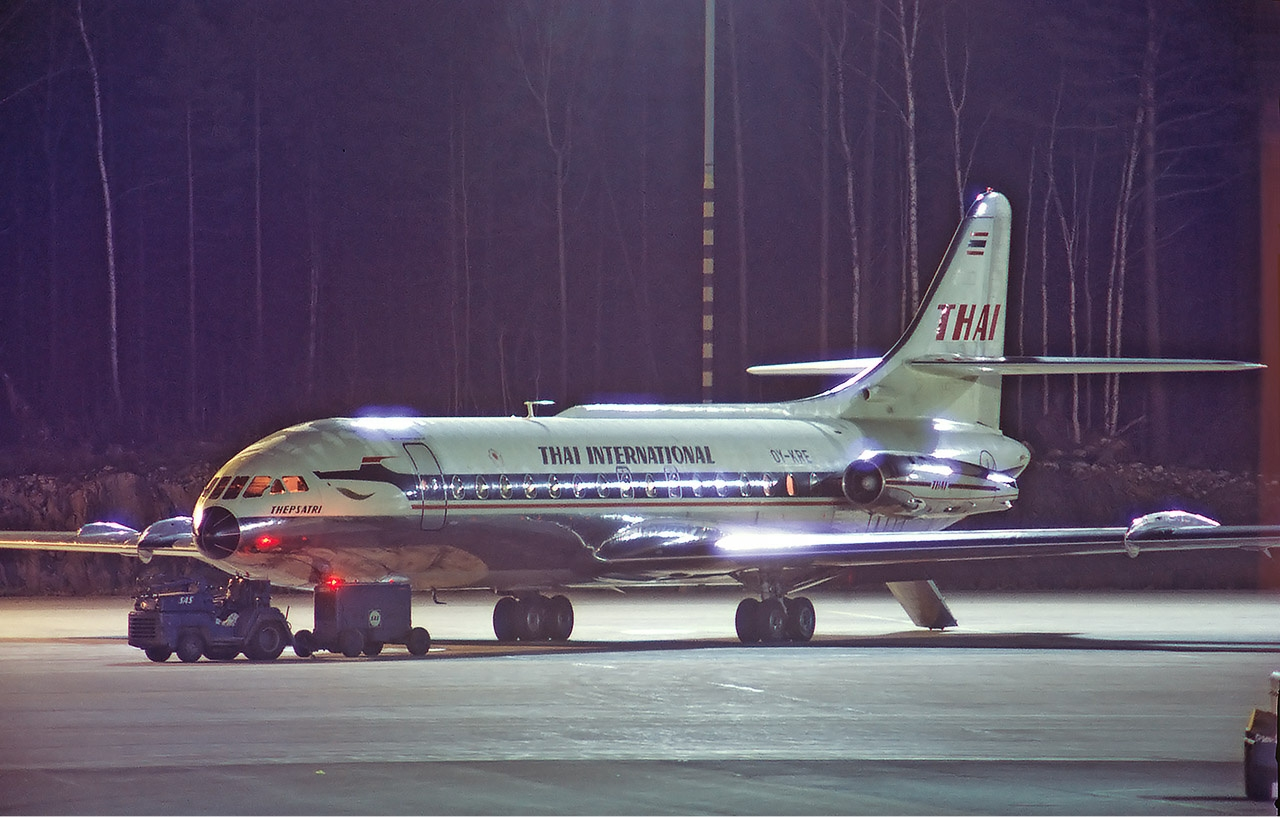
- A Thai Airways International SUD-Aviation Caravelle similar to the one involved.
- Aircraft type: Sud Aviation Caravelle III
- Aircraft name: Chiraprapa
- Operator: Thai Airways International
- Registration: HS-TGI
- Flight origin: Haneda Airport, Japan
- 1st stopover: Songshan Airport, Taiwan
- Last stopover: Kai Tak Airport, British Hong Kong
- Destination: Don Mueang Airport, Thailand
- Occupants: 80
- Passengers: 73
- Crew: 7
- Fatalities: 24
- Injuries: 3
- Survivors: 56

On 30 June 1967, Thai Airways International Flight 601, a Sud Aviation Caravelle III crashed into the sea on landing at the former Kai Tak Airport, Hong Kong, in a typhoon. The aircraft was on a flight from Haneda Airport in Japan to Don Mueang Airport in Thailand. The two stopovers were at Songshan Airport in Taiwan and Kai Tak Airport in British Hong Kong.

== Background ==
=== Aircraft ===
The aircraft involved was a Sud Aviation SE-210 Caravelle III, MSN 25, registered as HS-TGI, which was manufactured by Sud Aviation in 1960. The aircraft had logged approximately 17350 airframe hours and was equipped with two Rolls-Royce Avon 527 engines.

=== Crew ===
The Captain onboard Flight 601 was Viggo Thorsen (43). He had 7,800 flight hours, with 3,700 being on the Caravelle. His First Officer was Sanit Khemanand (50). Of his 18,400 total flight hours, 2,300 were on the Caravelle.

== Accident ==
Thai Airways International Flight 601 took off from Taipei Songshan Airport on an hour-long flight to Kai Tak Airport. The Sud Aviation Caravelle had 80 people aboard: 73 passengers and 7 crew. With the plane on ILS approach to runway 31 at Kai Tak, the crew became preoccupied trying to make visual contact with the ground. When trying to find the ground, they failed to notice that the aircraft had descended below the decision height of 415 feet (126 m). The crew made an abrupt heading change (while already 80 feet (24 m) below the glide slope), and then entered a high-speed descent. The aircraft crashed into the sea, killing 24 passengers.

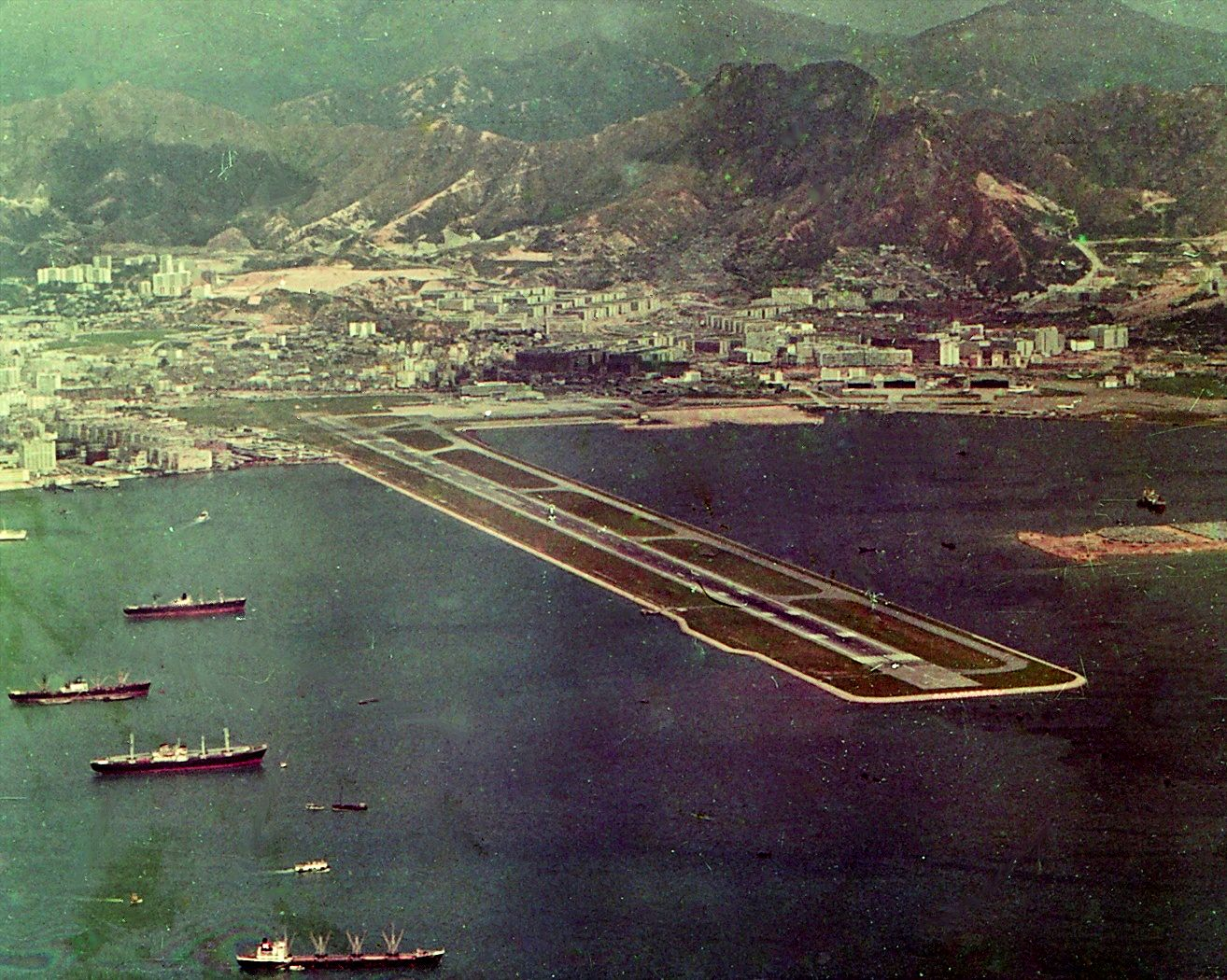
Kai Tak Airport in 1971, some four years after the crash of Flight 601.

== Probable cause ==
The probable cause of the accident was pilot error, specifically the pilots not noticing that their aircraft had descended below the glide slope. The presence of strong wind shear and downdrafts as a result of then-present Typhoon Anita was also a factor in the accident. However, there were no means of detecting such weather phenomena at the time of the accident. Further factors included:

- The pilots did not adhere to Thai Airways procedure for a captain-monitored Instrument approach in bad visibility.
- Captain Thorsen did not monitor the approach adequately.
- The abrupt heading change after the aircraft descended below their minimum altitude may have exacerbated the high rate of descent.
- Downdrafts and wind shear may have contributed to the height loss that resulted from this mishandling.
