= Typhoon Georgia (1959) =

Pacific typhoon in 1959

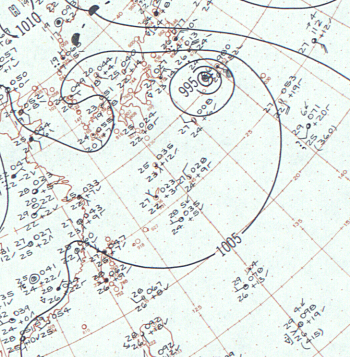
- Surface weather analysis of Typhoon Georgia on August 13

Meteorological history
- Formed: August 12, 1959
- Dissipated: August 16, 1959

Unknown-strength storm
- 10-minute sustained (JMA)
- Lowest pressure: 960 hPa (mbar); 28.35 inHg

Category 3-equivalent typhoon
- 1-minute sustained (SSHWS/JTWC)
- Highest winds: 205 km/h (125 mph)

Overall effects
- Fatalities: 188
- Missing: 47
- Damage: $50 million (1959 USD)
- Areas affected: Japan, Soviet Union, China
- Part of the 1959 Pacific typhoon season

Typhoon Georgia was a strong typhoon which struck Japan on August 14, 1959. It was also one of the few observed tropical cyclones that made direct landfall in Russia (then known as the Soviet Union) as a tropical storm. A low pressure system formed in the vicinity of Guam on August 10 which formed Tropical Depression Fran, and a new low-level center formed from a fracture of a trough that split newly formed tropical depression in the midnight of August 12. The newly formed low level center was classified as a tropical storm and was named Georgia hours later by the Joint Typhoon Warning Center. The new tropical storm was tracked by Japan Meteorological Agency shortly afterwards and Georgia rapidly intensified into a typhoon. On the next day, Georgia further intensified after passing Chichi Jima and reached peak sustained winds of 110 knots (57 m/s) while quickly accelerating in the north-northwest direction before striking Chūbu region in Japan on evening of the same day as a weakening typhoon. After emerging on the Sea of Japan as a tropical storm on August 14, Georgia made landfall in Soviet Union as a tropical storm at the afternoon of the same day, before transforming into an extratropical storm quickly after landfall. Remnants of Georgia was last noted on Heilongjiang, China on August 16.

Georgia caused destruction throughout Central Japan. Nagano and Yamanashi prefectures were the hardest hit from the typhoon, as the rains from the typhoon caused enormous damages, which was worsened by Typhoon Ellen from days earlier. Georgia left more than 50,000 families homeless, tore down miles of communication lines, and washed out bridges and roads. Georgia also caused the worst damage on railway transport network in Japan's history at the time. 4,089 houses were destroyed and 10,139 others were damaged. Because of the storm, 188 people were killed, 47 people were reported missing and 1,528 people were injured. Combined with damages from Typhoon Ellen, damages from Typhoon Georgia totaled $50 million (1959 USD).

== Meteorological history ==
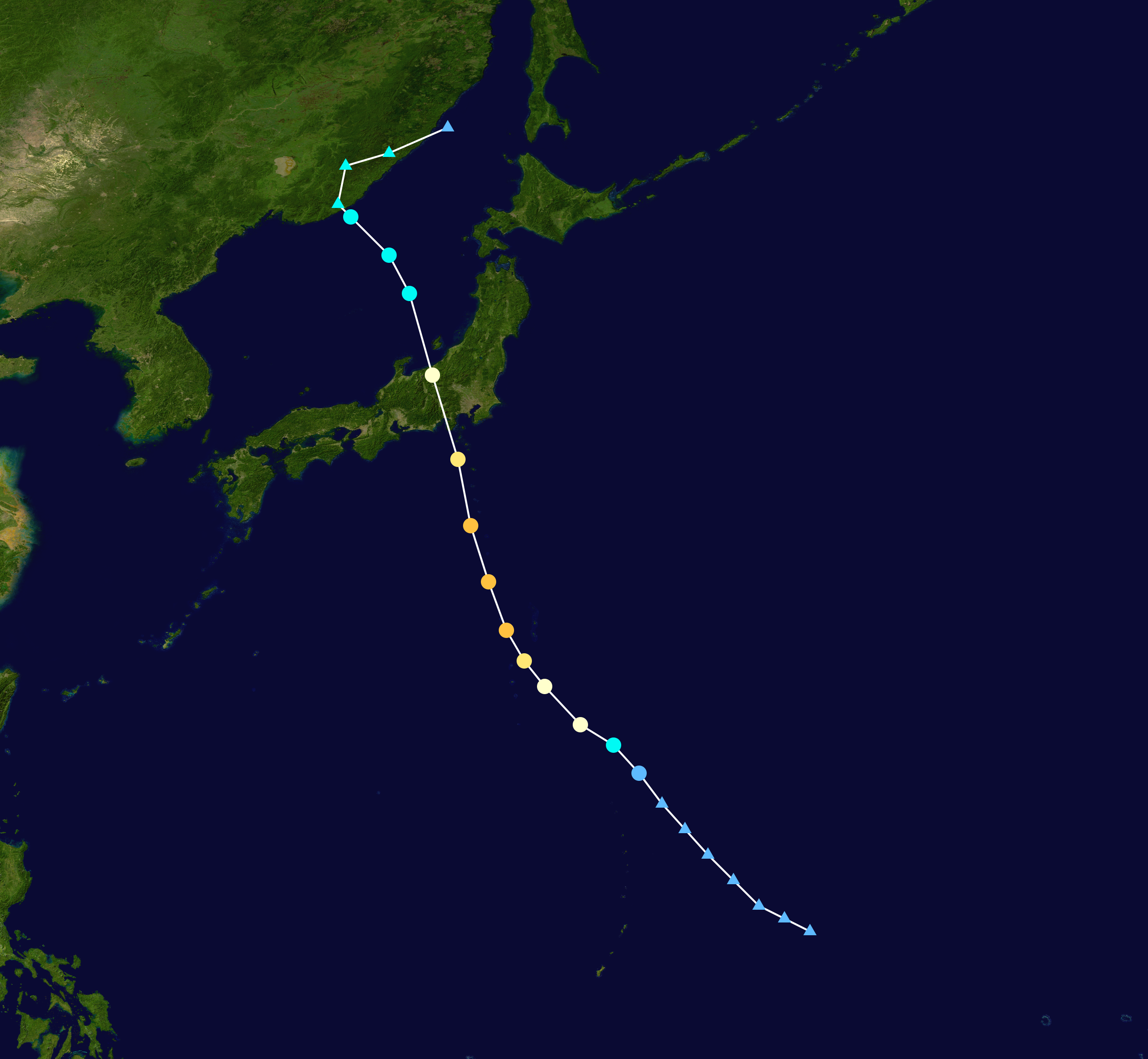
Map plotting the storm's track and intensity, according to the Saffir–Simpson scale Map key Saffir–Simpson scale Tropical depression (≤38 mph, ≤62 km/h) Tropical storm (39–73 mph, 63–118 km/h) Category 1 (74–95 mph, 119–153 km/h) Category 2 (96–110 mph, 154–177 km/h) Category 3 (111–129 mph, 178–208 km/h) Category 4 (130–156 mph, 209–251 km/h) Category 5 (≥157 mph, ≥252 km/h) Unknown Storm type Tropical cyclone Subtropical cyclone Extratropical cyclone, remnant low, tropical disturbance, or monsoon depression

An ill-defined low pressure system formed in the vicinity of Guam on 10 August, which spawned Tropical Depression Fran. A reconnaissance aircraft flew into newly formed Fran on 11 August. On the early next day, Fran split into two low level centers, which was induced by the fracture of an upper-air polar trough. Second reconnaissance aircraft was sent to investigate and in one hour later at 01:00 UTC, the new center was classified as a tropical storm and named the storm Georgia with wind speeds of 45 knots (23 m/s). The new center became the predominant circulation and caused Fran to quickly dissipate on the next day. In 09:00 UTC, Georgia quickly intensified into a typhoon with 65 knots (33 m/s) and JMA tracked the newly formed system.

Georgia assumed the north-western track with an average speed of 14 knots (7.2 m/s), and passed within 40 miles (64 km) northeast of Iwo Jima and 50 miles (80 km) southwest of Chichi Jima which reported winds of 40 knots (21 m/s) (53 knots (27 m/s) in gusts) and 30 knots (15 m/s) (48 knots (25 m/s) in gusts) on the next day. After passing Chichi Jima, Georgia accelerated and intensified into the peak sustained winds of 110 knots (57 m/s) and pressure of 960 millibars (28 inHg). Georgia turned into north-northwesterly direction and reached the speed of 25 knots (13 m/s).

In 22:30 UTC of the same day, Typhoon Georgia made landfall in the mouth of Fuji River with sustained winds of 75 knots (39 m/s). Georgia quickly traversed through the prefectures of Shizuoka, Yamanashi, Nagano and Niigata on the same night. On the midnight of the next day, Georgia emerged in the Sea of Japan through the vicinity of Jōetsu, Niigata as it weakened into a tropical storm. Wind speeds of 65.9 knots (33.9 m/s) (84.0 knots (43.2 m/s) in gusts) and 94.9 knots (48.8 m/s) (124 knots (64 m/s) in gusts) were observed in Kofu and Cape Irōzaki (Minamiizu), respectively. After crossing the Sea of Japan, Georgia made landfall as a tropical storm near Preobrazheniye, Primorsky Krai, Soviet Union at 15:00 UTC on the same day. After making landfall for the second time in Soviet Union, Georgia quickly transformed into a weak extratropical cyclone. The extratropical remnants of Georgia was last noted to be in Heilongjiang, China on August 16.

== Impact and aftermath ==
In Gifu Prefecture, Makita River was flooded by rains from Georgia. In Nagano and Yamanashi prefectures, damages caused by collapsing houses, falling trees were enormous. Damages left from Typhoon Ellen were worsened by Georgia in these prefectures. According National Rural Police, 48 people were dead and 51 were reported missing in Nagano and on Yamanashi 40 people were dead and 57 were reported missing.

In overall, Georgia left more than 50,000 families homeless, tore down miles of communication lines, and washed out bridges and roads. Georgia also caused the worst damage on railway transport network in Japan's history at the time. According to reports from JMA, Georgia destroyed 4,089 homes and damaged 10,139 others. Georgia also caused deaths of 188 people, 47 were reported missing and injured 1,528 people. Combined total damages from Ellen and Georgia is estimated at US$50 million (1959 USD) and approximately 205,000 acres (83,000 ha) of farmland were flooded.

Because of the impact inflicted by this typhoon and Typhoon Vera after a month later, these typhoons are considered as the part of 1959 disaster.

== See also ==
- Typhoon Higos (2002)
