= Typhoon Peggy =

Pacific typhoon in 1986

Typhoon Peggy (Gading)
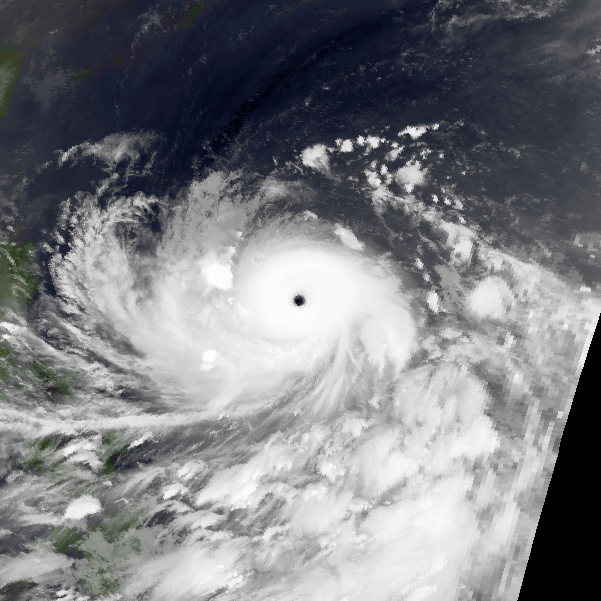
- Typhoon Peggy at peak intensity east of the Philippines late on July 6

Meteorological history
- Formed: July 3, 1986
- Dissipated: July 11, 1986

Violent typhoon
- 10-minute sustained (JMA)
- Highest winds: 205 km/h (125 mph)
- Lowest pressure: 900 hPa (mbar); 26.58 inHg

Category 5-equivalent super typhoon
- 1-minute sustained (SSHWS/JTWC)
- Highest winds: 260 km/h (160 mph)
- Lowest pressure: 900 hPa (mbar); 26.58 inHg

Overall effects
- Fatalities: ≥422 total
- Damage: $512 million (1986 USD)
- Areas affected: Philippines, China
- IBTrACS
- Part of the 1986 Pacific typhoon season

Typhoon Peggy, known in the Philippines as Super Typhoon Gading, was a very intense super typhoon that formed during the 1986 Pacific typhoon season. At the time of its occurrence, the typhoon was documented by PAGASA as the eight strongest Philippine typhoon on record. A tropical depression developed on July 3 east of the Philippines, and strengthened to a tropical storm the next day. It steadily strengthened to a typhoon, then continued to intensify and reached a peak strength of 130 knots (240 km/h; 150 mph) (Note: All winds are in ten-minute sustained standards unless otherwise implied by the agency the winds were from.) on July 7. As Peggy continued westward, it slowly weakened, and hit northeastern Luzon on July 9 as a 90 knots (170 km/h; 100 mph) typhoon. A slight weakening of the subtropical ridge brought Peggy northward, where it hit southeastern China as a 55 knots (102 km/h; 63 mph) tropical storm on July 11. It weakened and later dissipated into a remnant low on July 12.

In total, Peggy caused at least 333 deaths and $512 million (1986 USD) in damage.

== Meteorological history ==
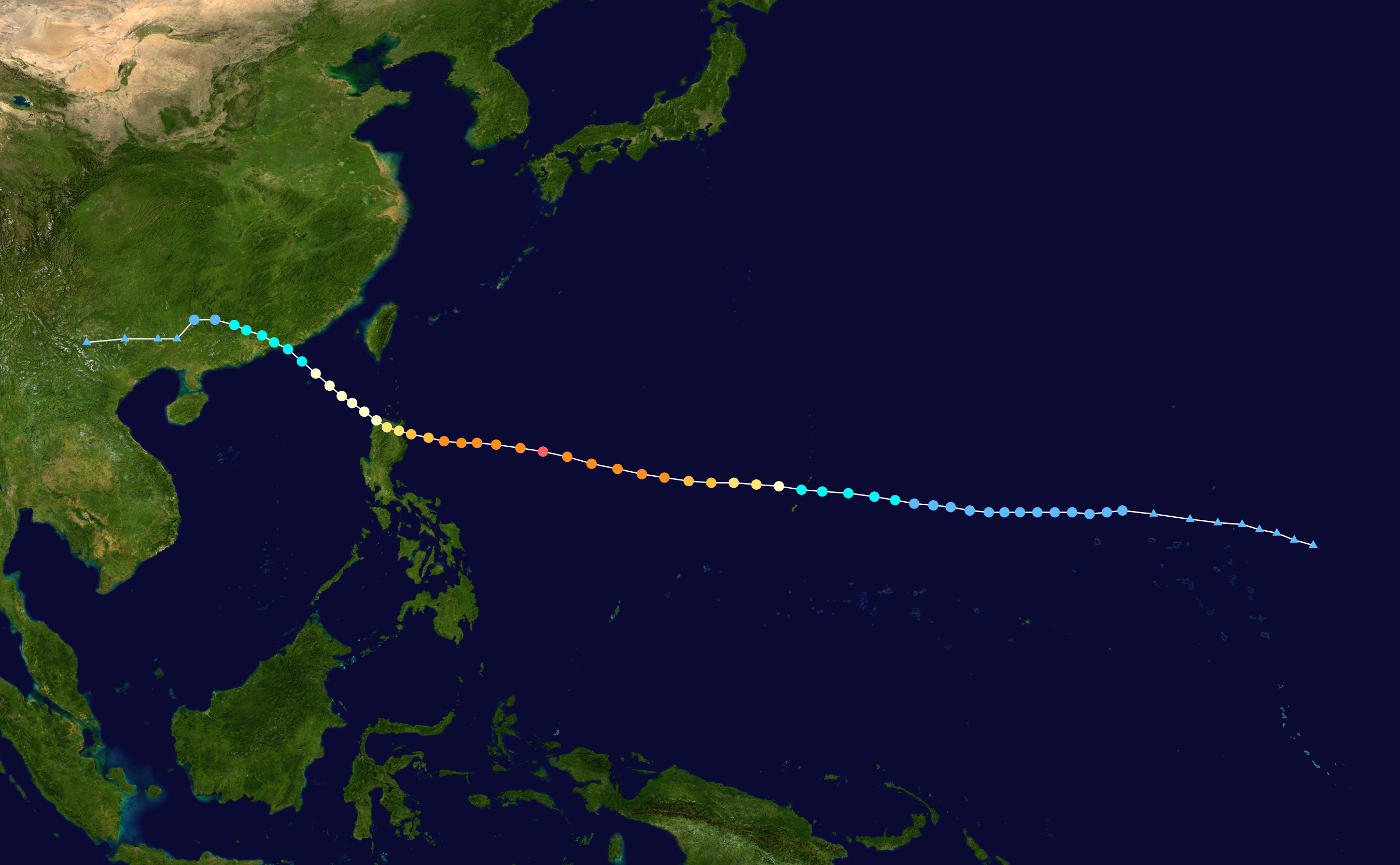
Map plotting the storm's track and intensity, according to the Saffir–Simpson scale Map key Saffir–Simpson scale Tropical depression (≤38 mph, ≤62 km/h) Tropical storm (39–73 mph, 63–118 km/h) Category 1 (74–95 mph, 119–153 km/h) Category 2 (96–110 mph, 154–177 km/h) Category 3 (111–129 mph, 178–208 km/h) Category 4 (130–156 mph, 209–251 km/h) Category 5 (≥157 mph, ≥252 km/h) Unknown Storm type Tropical cyclone Subtropical cyclone Extratropical cyclone, remnant low, tropical disturbance, or monsoon depression

Typhoon Peggy developed on July 3 east of the Philippines. The tropical storm steadily strengthened to reach a peak of 140 knots (260 km/h), becoming a super typhoon on July 7. As Peggy continued westward, it slowly weakened, and hit northeastern Luzon on July 9 as a 90 kn (170 km/h) typhoon. A slight weakening of the subtropical ridge brought Peggy more northward, where it hit southeastern China as a 55 kn (102 km/h) tropical storm on the July 11. (Note: The Joint Typhoon Warning Center is a joint United States Navy – United States Air Force task force that issues tropical cyclone warnings for the western Pacific Ocean and other regions.) (Note: The Japan Meteorological Agency is the official Regional Specialized Meteorological Center for the western Pacific Ocean.)

== Preparations, impact and aftermath ==
Heavy rainfall and gusty winds peaking at 86 km/h (55 mph) throughout Guam led to residential flooding, damaged crops, washed-out roadways, and scattered power outages.(ATCR) The island's annual Fourth of July parade, as well as a naturalization ceremony for 571 new citizens, were both cancelled. Farther north, in Saipan of the Northern Mariana Islands, downed transmission lines forced authorities to discontinue power as a safety precaution.

=== Philippines ===
In Baguio and surrounding towns, at least 44 people were killed, many of which occurred in landslides while they slept. Two major roads to the city were severed by landslides and floodwaters up to 10 ft (3 m) deep. More than 600 families were evacuated after a lake threatened to overflow its banks. Outside the city, high winds blew down houses and a landslide hit a mining camp, forcing residents to seek refuge in a school and gymnasium. At least 17 people were drowned or electrocuted across the provinces of Ilocos Sur, Bulacan and Pangasinan, including two people in Manaoag that were electrocuted while wading through floodwaters ridden with downed electrical wires, and two men that were electrocuted in Tondo while climbing a steel ladder. Eight other fatalities occurred throughout the provinces of Pampanga and Zambales. The Office of Civil Defense noted that 68,428 citizens spread throughout 11,388 families were evacuated from their submerged homes in the fishing town of Malabon. In Manila, schools and offices were closed, flooded streets delayed or stopped traffic, and wide areas of the city were without power as officials feared the spread of fire and downed power poles. At least 25 people were killed in the suburb of Quezon City, including four that were crushed in a shack. Domestic flights to northern provinces were canceled by Philippine Airlines in the aftermath of destroyed bridges, flooded roads, and landslides. One man was killed in the capital's suburb, Parañaque. The Philippine Navy sent two amphibious trucks as well as several small boats to aid in the evacuation of 10,500 families from Cavite and the fishing village of Navotas. Alert levels were raised at the United States Clark Air Base, though operations continued as normal there. At least 29 people died between the Benguet and Mountain provinces. Initial reports suggested 247,246 people across 41,216 families in all fled their flooded homes and took shelter in evacuation centers across the provinces of Beguet, Pangasinan, La Union, Cavite, and Rizal, as well as metropolitan Manila. At least 1,624 houses were damaged or destroyed, leaving 9,744 people homeless. Within ten towns in Nueva Ecija province, another 116,420 people in 19,405 families sought refuge in churches, schools, and municipal halls. In three northern provinces, the total cost of damage topped $10.6 million. Joker Arroyo, aide to then-President Corazon Aquino, blamed severe flooding in Manila on the "inefficient drainage system inherited from the previous administration" of Ferdinand Marcos, who was overthrown in a revolt five months prior. Total crop losses in the Philippines approached $27 million, while property damage was estimated at $4.5 million. In total, Peggy caused 109 casualties and $31.5 million in damage.

=== China ===
As Peggy threatened to impact Hong Kong, schools and businesses were shut down, bus and ferry services were suspended, and 12 flights were cancelled at Kai Tak International Airport. The International Finance Centre was closed, while taxis raised their prices to five times the normal trip. Though the cyclone passed about 130 km (80 mi) east of the city, wind gusts up to 78 knots (144 km/h; 90 mph) were recorded at Tate's Cairn and rainfall totals that reached 449 millimetres (17.7 in) in Tai Mo Shan. These winds and torrential rainfall led to a landslide, partially collapsed a road, downed several trees, and resulted in flooding. Throughout Guangdong, approximately 264,000 houses were destroyed and more than 100,000 others were damaged. Officials estimated that some 785 villages were left in complete ruin and would have to be rebuilt. Around 2,542 miles of high-tension wires were damaged, and litch and sugar canes were flattened. About 1.35 million acres of farmland, a majority of that rice-paddy fields, was flooded; 2,200 bridges were collapsed and 600 miles of telephone lines were downed. At least 172 people were killed and an additional 1,250 were injured. Up to 510,000 people were stranded throughout the province, including 7,000 stranded in the city of Shantou and 100,000 stranded in the town of Meichen after the Meijiang River overflowed its banks. and more than 2 million servicemen and civilians worked tirelessly to restore normal activities. Early estimates put the amount of grain damaged throughout Haifeng and Lufeng counties around 100,000 short tons (91,000 t), and an official estimated that losses throughout Guangdong reached $470 million. Thousands of people were mobilized for emergency services. Farthest northeast, on the outskirts of Shanghai, the biggest tornado in 30 years swept through 20 villages and flattened about 1,300 homes, leaving 31 people dead and 690 more injured. A 20-ton crane in Chuangsha County was lifted and tossed onto a boat carrying cement. The roof was ripped off a silk factory, destroying approximately $270,000 worth of silk. Meanwhile, approximately 30,000 residents were rescued in Jiexi and Puning counties, where apartment buildings containing at least 23,000 homes were destroyed. Tides up to 6 ft (2 m) above normal flooded the city of Shantou. Offshore, a British naval vessel rescued 15 Taiwanese seamen after their 1,411-ton freighter, Hwa Lie, carrying electronic equipment and textiles from Taiwan to Hong Kong sank in rough seas.

President Aquino allotted $500,000 in relief aid for the 25 northern provinces, as well as another $25,000 for Manila alone. The United States Embassy in Manila offered $400,000 to the Filipino Government and an additional $25,000 to the country's Red Cross.

== See also ==
- 1986 Pacific typhoon season
- Typhoon Mangkhut (2018)
