= Typhoon Gilda (1959) =

Pacific typhoon in 1959

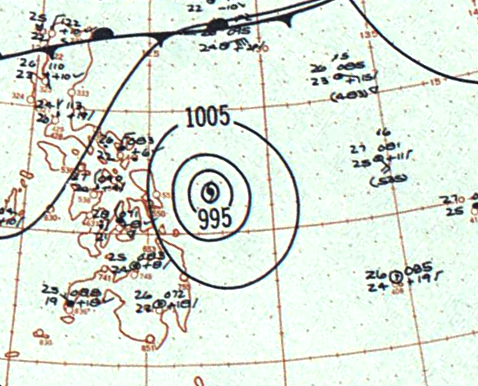
- Surface weather analysis of Gilda at peak intensity on December 7

Meteorological history
- Formed: December 13, 1959
- Dissipated: December 22, 1959

Typhoon
- 10-minute sustained (JMA)
- Lowest pressure: 925 hPa (mbar); 27.32 inHg

Category 5-equivalent super typhoon
- 1-minute sustained (SSHWS/JTWC)
- Highest winds: 280 km/h (175 mph)
- Lowest pressure: 914 hPa (mbar); 26.99 inHg

Overall effects
- Fatalities: 23
- Damage: $1.5 million (1959 USD)
- Areas affected: Philippines, Vietnam
- IBTrACS
- Part of the 1959 Pacific typhoon season

Typhoon Gilda was an intense tropical cyclone that struck regions of the central Philippines in December 1959. An unusually strong late-season storm, Gilda developed on December 13 from a disturbance first identified southeast of Chuuk State three days prior. Steadily intensifying, Gilda reached typhoon strength the next day and proceeded in a general westward track towards the Philippines. On December 18, the typhoon peaked with maximum sustained winds of 280 km/h (170 mph) shortly before the storm made landfall on Samar with a slightly weakened intensity. (Note: All measurements and estimates of maximum sustained wind are sustained over a one-minute period, following convention set by the JTWC.) After passing into the South China Sea, Gilda steadily weakened and made a final landfall in southern Vietnam before dissipating on December 22 over Cambodia. Damage in the Philippines was extensive, and in some locations telecommunications were cut. Impacts in Samar were particularly severe, and in some areas the damage was the worst in 30 years. Homes and crops sustained significant losses. Overall, Gilda caused the deaths of 23 in the Philippines and US$1.5 million in damage. (Note: All monetary values are in their respective currency's worth in 1959.)

== Meteorological history ==
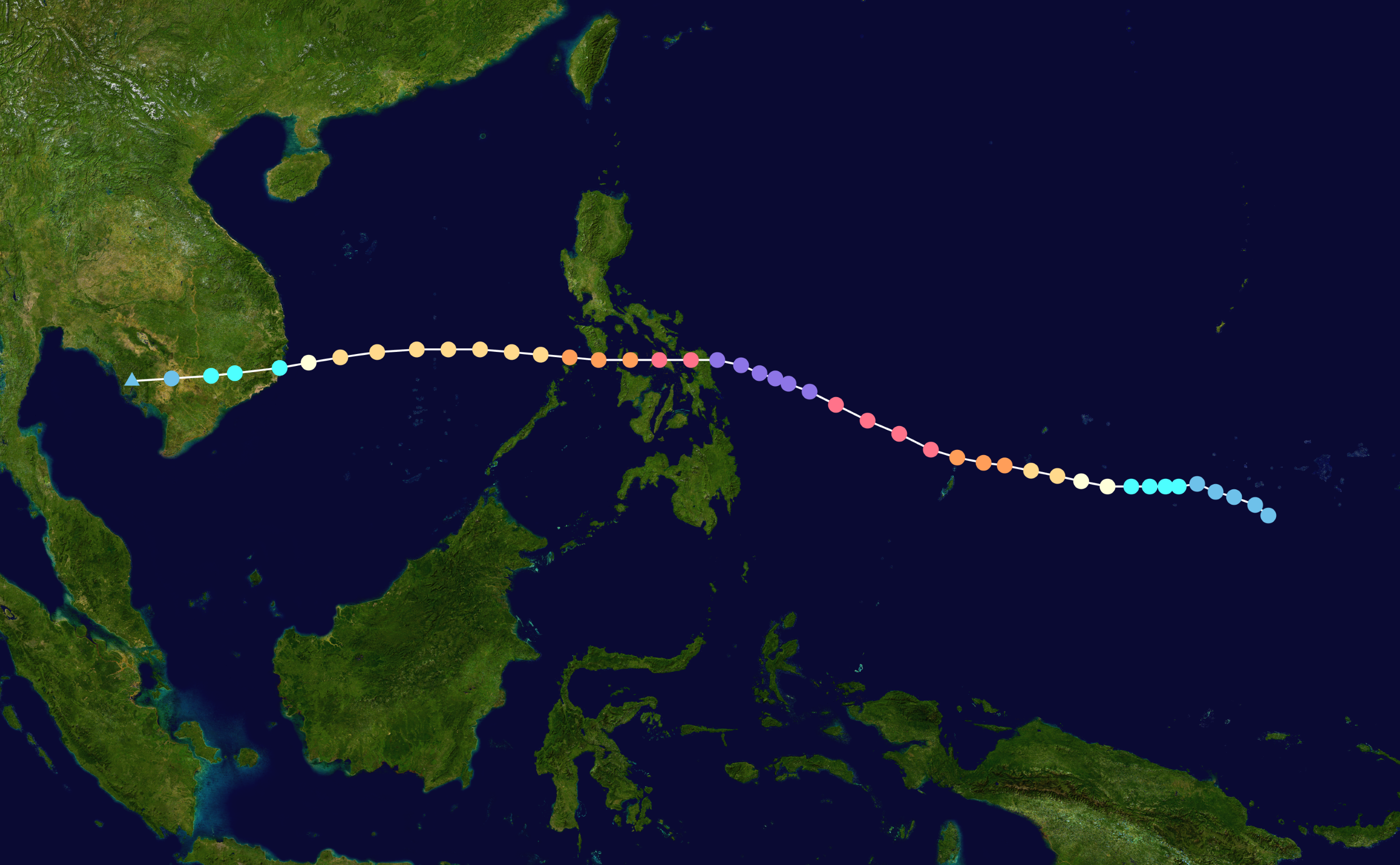
Map plotting the storm's track and intensity, according to the Saffir–Simpson scale Map key Saffir–Simpson scale Tropical depression (≤38 mph, ≤62 km/h) Tropical storm (39–73 mph, 63–118 km/h) Category 1 (74–95 mph, 119–153 km/h) Category 2 (96–110 mph, 154–177 km/h) Category 3 (111–129 mph, 178–208 km/h) Category 4 (130–156 mph, 209–251 km/h) Category 5 (≥157 mph, ≥252 km/h) Unknown Storm type Tropical cyclone Subtropical cyclone Extratropical cyclone, remnant low, tropical disturbance, or monsoon depression

On December 10, surface observations from Chuuk State suggested that a tropical cyclone was potentially developing to the island's southeast. As a result, the Joint Typhoon Warning Center (JTWC) requested aircraft reconnaissance on the system, which located a defined but weak circulation center 640 km (400 mi) southeast of Guam associated with the disturbance. Over the next few days, the system slowly intensified, with the Japan Meteorological Agency (JMA) determining the storm to have reached tropical depression strength at 1800 UTC on December 11 and the JTWC indicating tropical storm intensity by December 13. That day, reconnaissance indicated that the storm had two distinct circulation centers, both weak in intensity. However, these vortices later consolidated, allowing for Gilda to quickly intensify to typhoon status at 0000 UTC on December 14; by this time a small eye had been identified within the cyclone.

After reaching typhoon status, Gilda assumed a west-northwesterly course at a steady pace while gradually intensifying. The development of a trough in the Luzon Strait caused the forward motion of the typhoon to slow on December 16, prompting the JTWC to forecast a recurvature to the north and northeast at the time. However, the trough remained weak, allowing for Gilda to accelerate westward towards the Philippines. At 1800 UTC, the JMA indicated that Gilda had peaked with a minimum barometric pressure of 925 mbar (694 mmHg). Twelve hours later, the storm attained its peak maximum sustained winds of 280 km/h (170 mph), which Gilda maintained for another twelve hours. Shortly after 0000 UTC on December 18, Gilda made landfall on Samar Island in the Philippines with a slightly weakened intensity. By the day's end, the typhoon emerged into the South China Sea, where it began to steadily weaken. At roughly 1200 UTC on December 21, the system was downgraded to tropical storm status, at which time it made a final landfall near Phan Rang–Tháp Chàm in Vietnam. Weakening inland, the tropical cyclone was last noted over western Cambodia on December 22.

== Preparations and impact ==
On December 19, a LORAN station in the western Philippines documented maximum sustained winds of 150 km/h (93 mph) in addition to gusts as high as 260 km/h (160 mph). Across nine provinces in the central Philippines, at least 23 people were killed and another 60,000 were displaced, and Gilda was considered one of the country's worst tropical cyclones in recent memory. The sinking of the motorship Rizal in the waters off of southern Luzon resulted in the deaths of 14 people, though 64 others survived the capsizing. Homes and public work projects sustained heavy damage from the storm. On Samar, damage to crops, homes, and communication lines totaled US$500,000. Some of the damage on the island was considered the worst in 30 years. About 2,500 homes were swept away by storm surge and flood in 27 towns. The coconut industry suffered a major blow from the typhoon, and local authorities indicated that coconut production would take roughly four years to recovery to pre-typhoon levels. The fallen lines disrupted telecommunications during the storm's passage. A group of 100 teachers attending a convention were feared to have been killed in Zumarraga, Samar but were later found. Overall, damage from Gilda in the Philippines amounted to US$1.5 million. Following the storm, Philippine government welfare agencies quickened recovery efforts due to the approach of Christmas. Damage from Gilda in Vietnam, if any, remains unknown.

== See also ==
- Typhoon Pamela (1966)
- Typhoon Emma (1967)
- Typhoon Kit (1972)
- Typhoon Trix (1952)
