= Typhoon Gloria (1996) =

Pacific typhoon in 1996

Typhoon Gloria (Gloring)
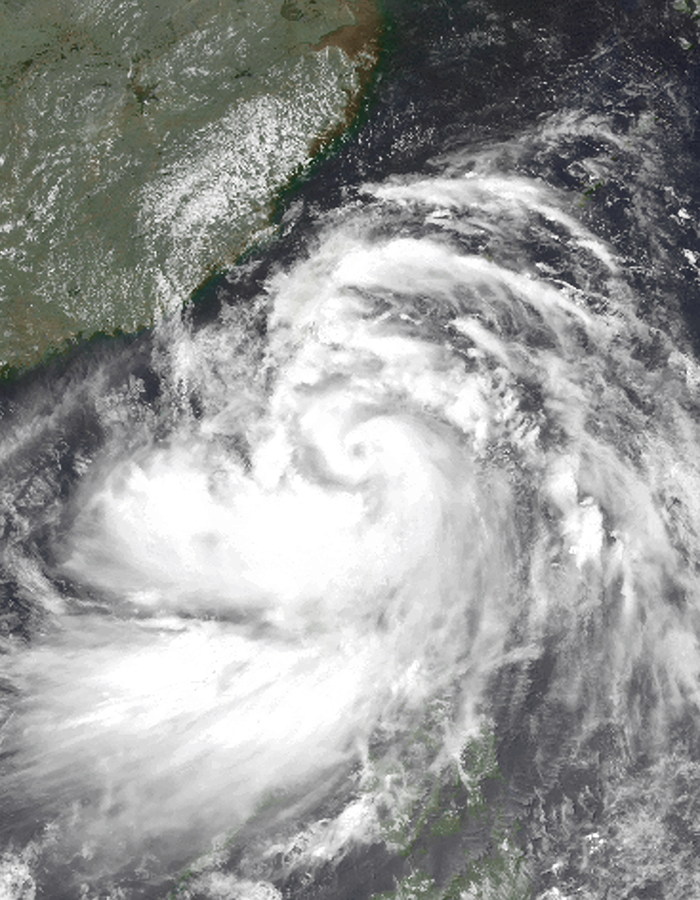
- Gloria at peak intensity north of Taiwan on July 25

Meteorological history
- Formed: July 21, 1996
- Dissipated: July 28, 1996

Typhoon
- 10-minute sustained (JMA)
- Highest winds: 120 km/h (75 mph)
- Lowest pressure: 965 hPa (mbar); 28.50 inHg

Category 2-equivalent typhoon
- 1-minute sustained (SSHWS/JTWC)
- Highest winds: 165 km/h (105 mph)
- Lowest pressure: 954 hPa (mbar); 28.17 inHg

Overall effects
- Fatalities: 75
- Injuries: 83
- Missing: 1
- Damage: $54 million (1996 USD)
- Areas affected: Palau; Philippines; Taiwan; China
- Part of the 1996 Pacific typhoon season

Typhoon Gloria, known in the Philippines as Typhoon Gloring, was a deadly and destructive tropical cyclone that impacted Southeast Asia during July 1996.

== Meteorological history ==
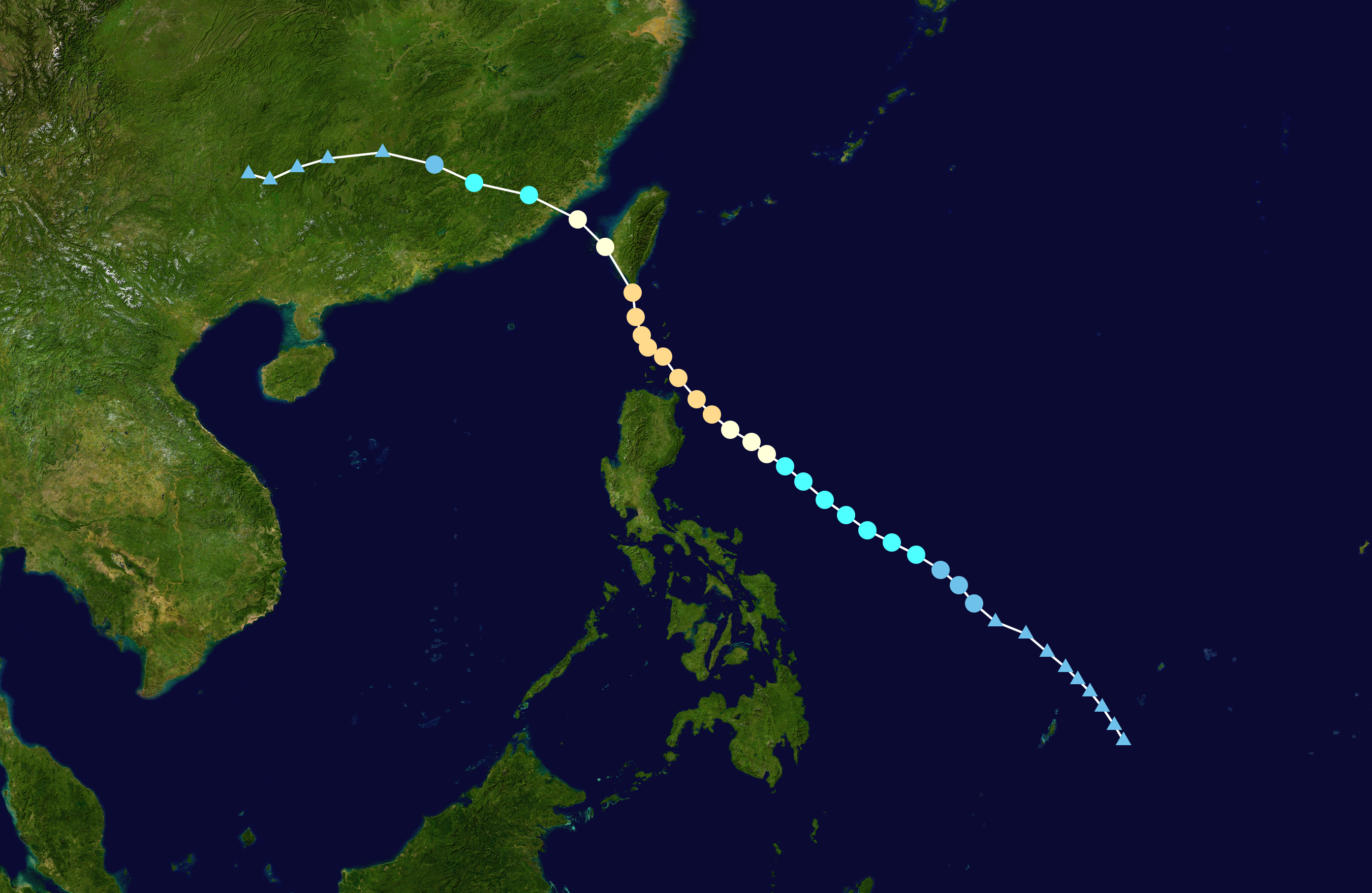
Map plotting the storm's track and intensity, according to the Saffir–Simpson scale Map key Saffir–Simpson scale Tropical depression (≤38 mph, ≤62 km/h) Tropical storm (39–73 mph, 63–118 km/h) Category 1 (74–95 mph, 119–153 km/h) Category 2 (96–110 mph, 154–177 km/h) Category 3 (111–129 mph, 178–208 km/h) Category 4 (130–156 mph, 209–251 km/h) Category 5 (≥157 mph, ≥252 km/h) Unknown Storm type Tropical cyclone Subtropical cyclone Extratropical cyclone, remnant low, tropical disturbance, or monsoon depression

The same monsoon trough that spawned Tropical Storm Frankie and Typhoon Herb also spawned a tropical depression on July 19 east of the Philippines. It headed northwestward, slowly organizing into a tropical storm on July 22, receiving the name Gloria. The next day, Gloria reached typhoon strength, and a day later it reached its peak intensity of 75 mph (121 km/h) and 965 hPa (28.5 inHg). Gloria brushed the northern coast of the Philippines and turned northward to hit Taiwan on July 26. After crossing the island and the Taiwan Strait, Gloria made landfall in China, where it dissipated on July 27.

== Preparations, impact, and aftermath ==
The 1996 SEABA Under-18 Championship, which was scheduled to open on July 26, was postponed due to floods caused by Gloria. Authorities in the Philippines issued a full lahar alert for Pampanga and the rest of Central Luzon. In Wuhan, due to previous flooding, which officials warned would be exacerbated by Gloria, local police and volunteers manned dikes to prevent the Yangtze from overflowing. Flights would be cancelled in Taiwan due to wind gusts from the typhoon. Additionally, more than a hundred securities brokerage were closed. Authorities allowed several thousand Chinese boats to take shelter on the Taiwanese coast.

Initial reports indicated that least 20 people died in the Philippines, with eight more reported missing. Later reports by the National Disaster Coordinating Council indicated that the typhoon caused 72 deaths and 77 injuries. Additionally, it damaged more than 7,500 houses and resulted in a total of ₱2.121 billion (USD$36 million) in damages. Around 3,000 people stayed in shelters because their houses were destroyed. Parts of Quezon City were flooded, forcing victims to swim for safety. Flooding was recorded throughout Luzon and volcanic debris from Mount Pinatubo was loosened, although a levee constructed to contain silt would withstand the debris. All roads to Baguio were closed to traffic. due to landslides. Several bridges and roads in the provinces of Ilocos Sur, Cagayan, Nueva Vizcaya and Occidental Mindoro were washed out or damaged. Western Luzon and Eastern Taiwan saw 200–680 millimetres (7.9–26.8 in) of rainfall. Local rice damage was also reported throughout the region. Two vessels were sunk during the typhoon. The Gongogong Bridge suffered significant damage, adversely affecting movement of people and farm goods in Sigay.

In Taiwan, Gloria caused considerable damage to agricultural produce, with economic losses estimated at NT$580 million. A five-year-old girl was killed by a falling tree in Tainan, a motorcyclist drowned in a creek, and a villager fell from his roof while making repairs. In total, three people died, one person was reported missing, and six were injured. Rock slides caused disruptions alongside Taiwan's eastern coast, while heavy rains flooded fields and overflowed riverbanks. Parts of China saw at least 40 millimetres (1.6 in) of rain, with totals topping 120 millimetres (4.7 in) in the central provinces. In Hong Kong, Gloria's outer winds blew dust and dry heat from the northwest, bringing haze and dry ozone and causing the air pollution index to rise to 118.

Following the typhoon, on July 25, President of the Philippines Fidel V. Ramos placed several provinces under a state of calamity. The Department of Social Welfare and Development released 100 boxes of food to affected areas, while the Armed Forces of the Philippines established a command post in Pampanga to monitor lahar flows. In January 1998, President Ramos approved the release of further funds to restore and repair infrastructure damaged by the typhoon.
