= Tropical Storm Gary (1992) =

Pacific tropical storm in 1992

Severe Tropical Storm Gary (Ditang)
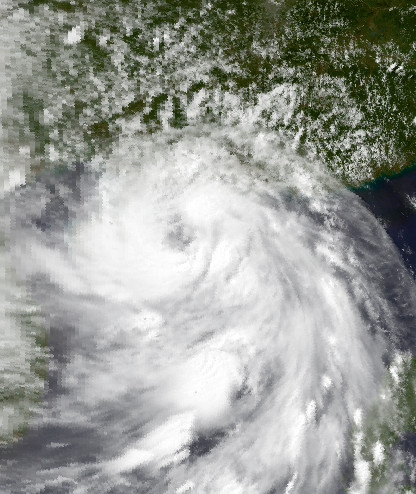
- Severe Tropical Storm Gary on July 22

Meteorological history
- Formed: July 17, 1992
- Dissipated: July 24, 1992

Severe tropical storm
- 10-minute sustained (JMA)
- Highest winds: 100 km/h (65 mph)
- Lowest pressure: 980 hPa (mbar); 28.94 inHg

Category 1-equivalent typhoon
- 1-minute sustained (SSHWS/JTWC)
- Highest winds: 120 km/h (75 mph)
- Lowest pressure: 976 hPa (mbar); 28.82 inHg

Overall effects
- Fatalities: 62
- Damage: $1.11 billion (1992 USD)
- Areas affected: Hong Kong, China, Philippines
- Part of the 1992 Pacific typhoon season

Severe Tropical Storm Gary, known as Ditang in the Philippines, was a strong and destructive tropical cyclone that affected China and the Philippines in 1992. Gary was upgraded to a tropical storm on July 21. On July 22, the Japan Meteorological Agency (JMA) reported that Gary had attained a minimum pressure of 980 hPa (29 inHg). In the Philippines, 36 people were killed. In China, 26 deaths were reported and 486 bridges were damaged. In Hong Kong, at least 18 people were injured. In Macau, no injuries and deaths were reported.

== Meteorological history ==
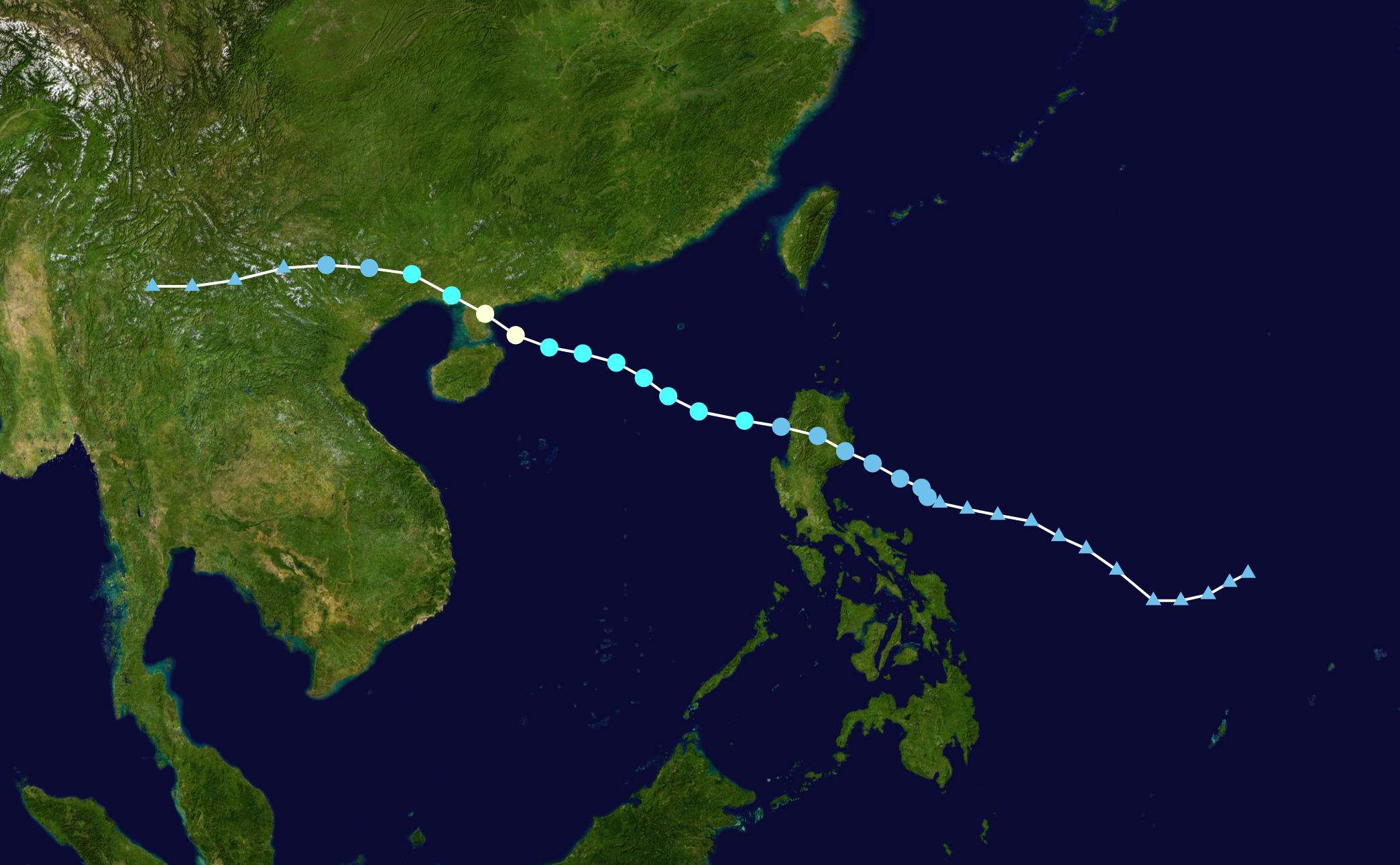
Map plotting the storm's track and intensity, according to the Saffir–Simpson scale Map key Saffir–Simpson scale Tropical depression (≤38 mph, ≤62 km/h) Tropical storm (39–73 mph, 63–118 km/h) Category 1 (74–95 mph, 119–153 km/h) Category 2 (96–110 mph, 154–177 km/h) Category 3 (111–129 mph, 178–208 km/h) Category 4 (130–156 mph, 209–251 km/h) Category 5 (≥157 mph, ≥252 km/h) Unknown Storm type Tropical cyclone Subtropical cyclone Extratropical cyclone, remnant low, tropical disturbance, or monsoon depression

On July 16, the Joint Typhoon Warning Center (JTWC) first monitored a tropical disturbance northwest of Yap. On July 17, the JTWC issued a Tropical Cyclone Formation Alert (TCFA). At 06:00 UTC on July 17, the Japan Meteorological Agency (JMA) began monitoring the system as a tropical depression. Once the storm crossed the Philippine Area of Responsibility (PAR) on July 17, the Philippine Atmospheric, Geophysical and Astronomical Services Administration (PAGASA) assigned it the local name Ditang. At 0:00 UTC on July 19, the JTWC issued its first warning on Tropical Depression 07W. At 08:00 UTC on July 20, Gary made its first landfall in Dinapigue as a tropical depression. At 18:00 UTC on the same day, the JTWC upgraded Gary to a tropical storm. At 00:00 UTC on July 21, the JMA upgraded Gary to a tropical storm. At 00:00 UTC on July 22, the JMA upgraded Gary to a severe tropical storm. At 06:00 UTC on the same day, the JMA estimated a minimum pressure of 980 hPa (29 inHg).

At 12:00 UTC on the same day, the storm developed a large ragged eye, and the JTWC upgraded Gary to a Category 1 typhoon. At 18:00 UTC on the same day, Gary made landfall near Zhanjiang. At 00:00 UTC on July 23, both the JMA and JTWC downgraded Gary to a tropical storm. At 12:00 UTC on July 23, the JTWC issued the final warning on the system. The storm dissipated between Yunnan and Myanmar at 18:00 UTC on July 24.

== Preparations and Impact ==
In the Philippines, 36 people were killed, 77 were injured, and six were reported missing. A total of 134,417 people were affected. Total damage was estimated at $18.4 million (₱471 million), including $9.7 million (₱249 million) in damage to infrastructure and $8.3 million (₱213 million) in damage to agriculture. (Note: Money values converted via Pacific Exchange Rate Service at 1992 exchange rates.) A total of 478 homes were severely damaged. 1,305 homes were partially damaged. Fifteen passengers were killed in Palayan City. Five people were reported drowned in Caloocan City. A 30-year-old woman was drowned. One person drowned in Quezon City. Central Luzon was declared the hardest-hit area. Four-foot (1.2 m) mudflows from rains were reported on Mount Pinatubo. 53 families were evacuated in Zambales and 183 families were evacuated in Caloocan. President Fidel V. Ramos declared a state of calamity in 2 cities and Nueva Ecija province.

On July 20 at 10:30 pm HKT, Hong Kong's Royal Observatory issued a Signal No. 1. The following day, at 03:45 pm HKT, the Royal Observatory raised it to a Strong Wind Signal No. 3. On July 22, at 05:45 am HKT, the Royal Observatory raised its warning to Northeast Gale or Signal No. 8. At 04:15 pm HKT the same day, the Royal Observatory downgraded its warning to Strong Wind Signal No. 3. At 06:50 pm HKT, all signals were lowered. A total of 18 injuries were reported. Falling trees were reported in two locations.

Throughout China, 1,042 km (647 mi) of roads and 486 bridges were damaged, whose value was estimated at $1.09 billion (6 billion RMB). One fatality occurred, and nine people were injured. A total of 100,000 homes, 226,100 ha (559,000 acres) of crops, 362 km (225 mi) of roads, 86 bridges, 19 reservoirs, two power stations, and 63 rural water conservancy projects were damaged. A total of 20,000 homes, 290 km (180 mi) of high and low voltage power lines, 374 km (232 mi) of communication lines, and 434 culverts and sluices were destroyed. 29,000 thatched houses collapsed. The water levels in the Zuojiang and Yujiang rivers increased considerably. 700 boats were damaged, including 540 sailing boats and 147 motorized boats. Damage was estimated at 5 billion RMB in Guangdong. In Xuwen County, rainfall peaked at 267 mm (10.5 in) in one day. In Guangxi, 25 people were reported dead and 54 people were injured. Approximately 23,000 homes were either destroyed or sustained damage. A total of 680 km (420 mi) of roads, 400 bridges, and 304 km (189 mi) of drainage pipes were damaged. 102,400 ha (253,000 acres) of farmland were flooded. Damage in the province was estimated at 1 billion RMB.
