= 1989–90 South Pacific cyclone season =

Tropical cyclone season

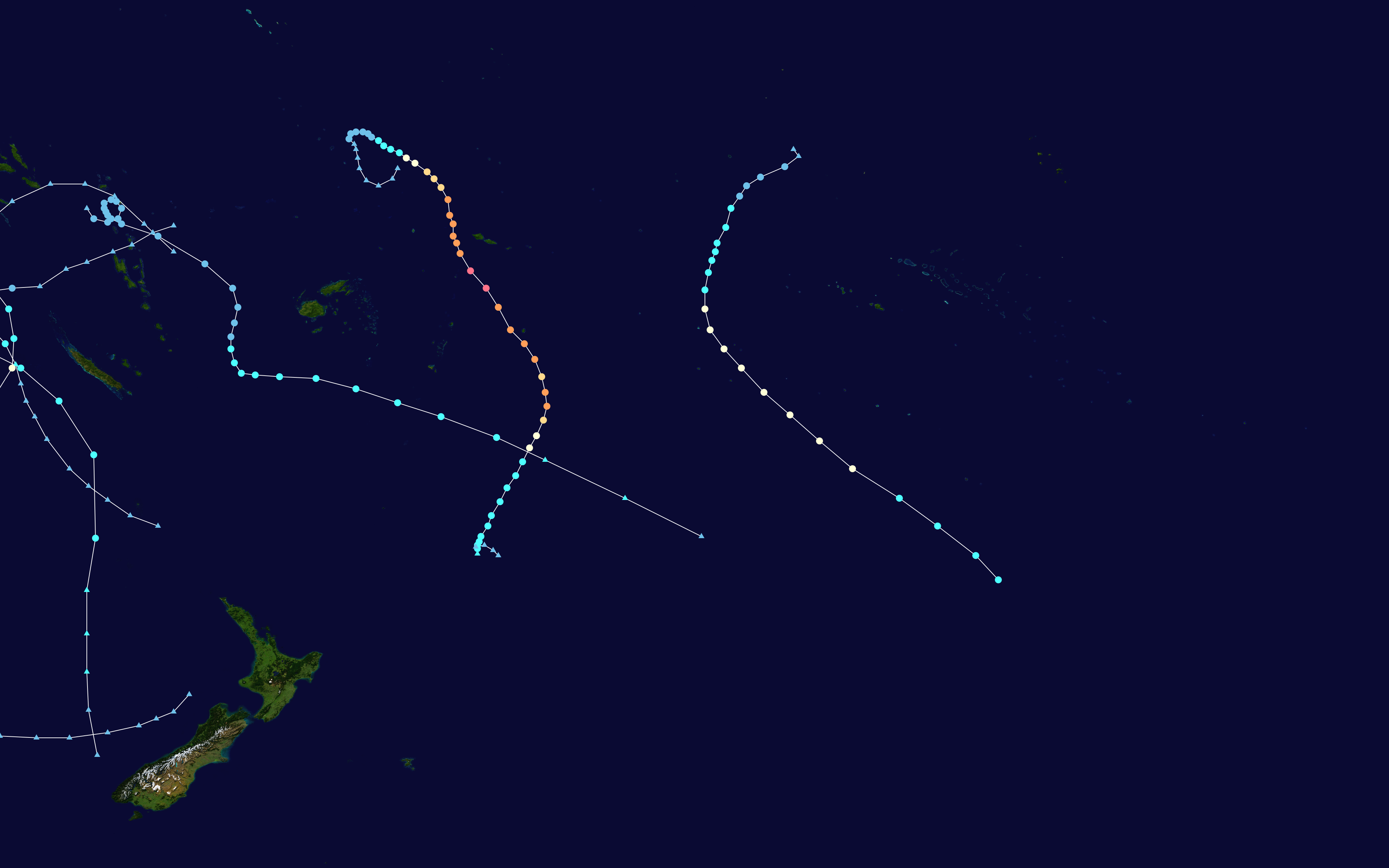
- Season summary map

Seasonal boundaries
- First system formed: November 8, 1989
- Last system dissipated: March 25, 1990

Strongest storm
- Name: Ofa
  - Maximum winds: 185 km/h (115 mph) (10-minute sustained)
  - Lowest pressure: 925 hPa (mbar)

Seasonal statistics
- Total depressions: 11
- Tropical cyclones: 5
- Severe tropical cyclones: 2
- Total fatalities: 11
- Total damage: > $187 million (1990 USD)

Related articles
- 1989–90 South-West Indian Ocean cyclone season; 1989–90 Australian region cyclone season

The 1989–90 South Pacific cyclone season was a below-average season with only five tropical cyclones occurring within the South Pacific to the east of 160°E. (Note: An average season has nine tropical cyclones, about half of which become severe tropical cyclones.) The season officially ran from November 1, 1989, to April 30, 1990, with the first disturbance of the season forming on November 8 and the last disturbance dissipating on March 19. (Note: TCWC Nadi warned on systems in the South Pacific which is located from the equator to 25°S and from 160°E to 120°W. TCWC Wellington warns on systems from 25°S to 40°S and from 160°E to 120°W) This is the period of the year when most tropical cyclones form within the South Pacific Ocean.

During the season at least 15 people were killed from tropical disturbances whilst overall damage was estimated at $196 million. The most damaging tropical disturbance was Cyclone Ofa, one of the strongest storms to affect Samoa in the 20th century, which caused at least $180 million in damage to multiple countries and left eight dead. Cyclone Nancy caused $14 million in damages to Queensland and NSW, Australia and killed four people. During the formative stages of Cyclone Peni, the system caused $1 million in damages to the Cook Islands. Cyclone Rae drowned three people in Fiji but caused only $1 million (1990 USD) of damages to crops and vegetation. As a result of the impacts caused by Ofa and Peni, the names were retired from the tropical cyclone naming lists.

During the season, tropical cyclones were monitored by the Tropical Cyclone Warning Centers (TCWC) in Nadi, Fiji, and in Wellington, New Zealand. (Note: TCWC Nadi warned on systems in the South Pacific located from the Equator to 25°S and from 160°E to 120°W. TCWC Wellington warns on systems from 25°S to 40°S and from 160°E to 120°W) Whilst tropical cyclones that moved to the west of 160°E were monitored as a part of the Australian region. Both the United States Joint Typhoon Warning Center (JTWC) and the Naval Western Oceanography Center (NWOC) issued unofficial warnings within the southern Pacific. The JTWC issued warnings between 160°E and the International Date Line whilst the NWOC issued warnings for tropical cyclones forming between the International Date Line and the coasts of the Americas. Both the JTWC and the NWOC designated tropical cyclones with a number and a P suffix with numbers assigned in order to tropical cyclones developing within the whole of the Southern Hemisphere. TCWC Nadi, TCWC Wellington and TCWC Brisbane all use the Australian Tropical Cyclone Intensity Scale and estimate wind speeds over a ten-minute period, while the JTWC estimates sustained winds over a one-minute period, which are subsequently compared to the Saffir–Simpson hurricane wind scale (SSHWS).

== Systems ==
=== Tropical Depression Felicity ===
- Tropical depression (Australian scale)
- Tropical storm (SSHWS)
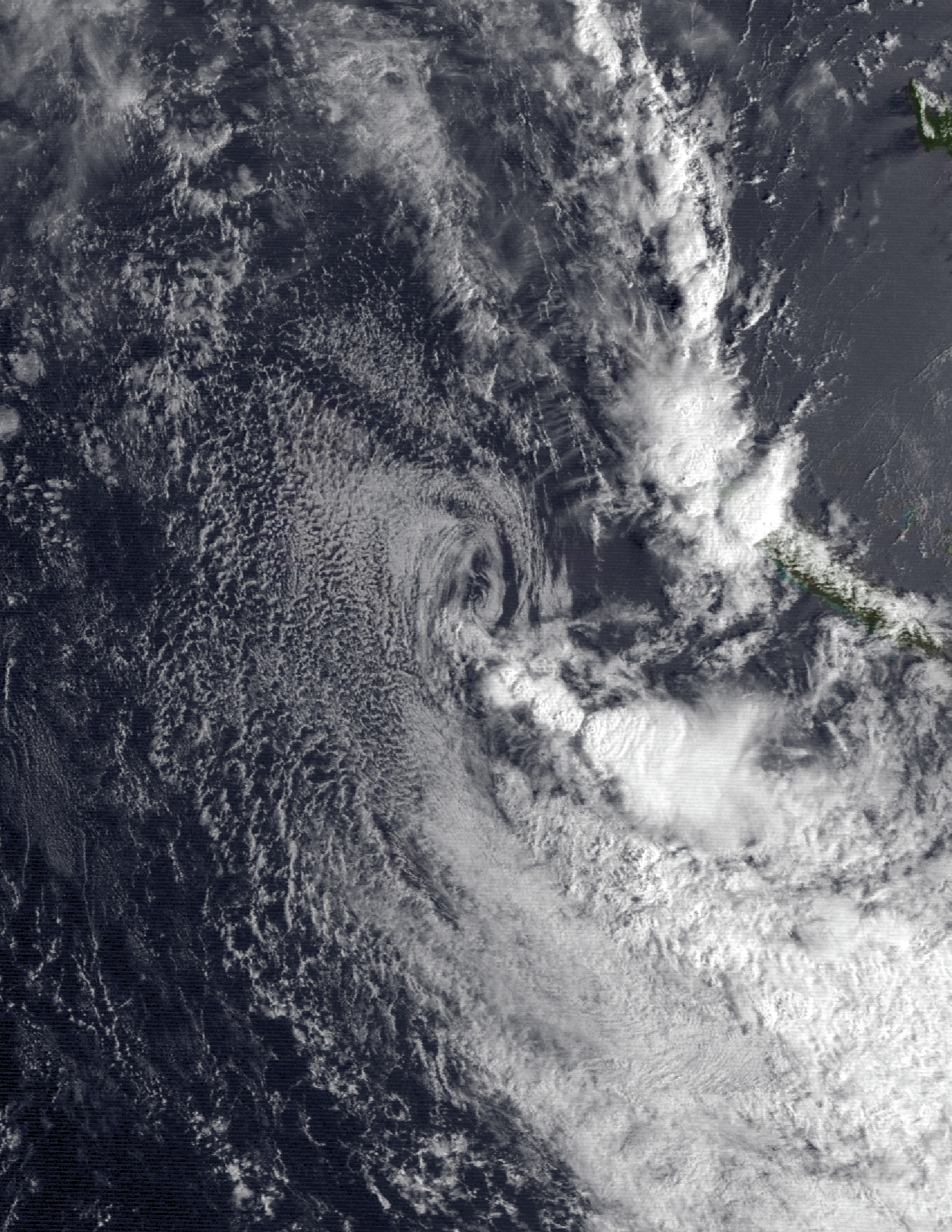
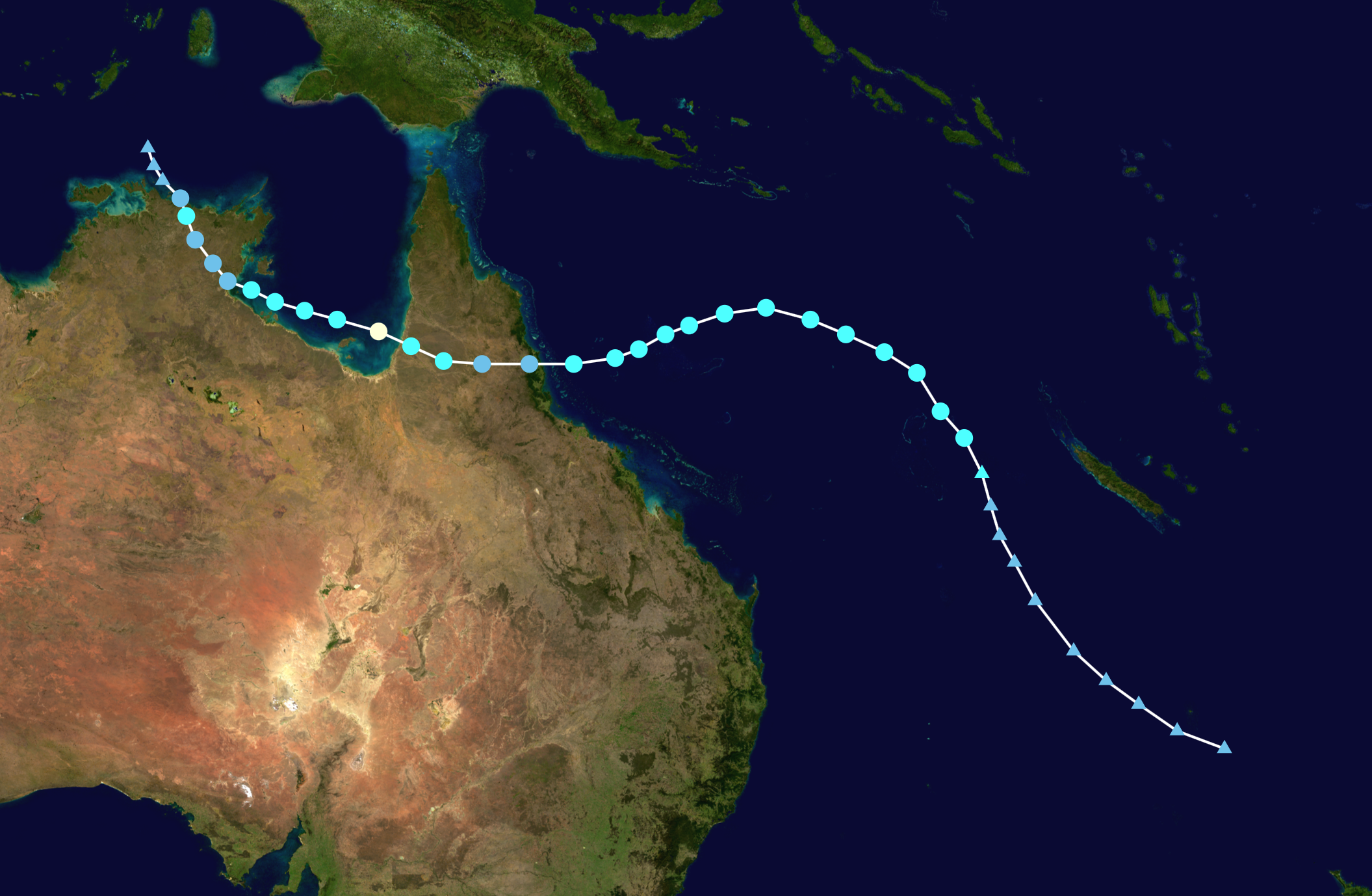
- Duration: December 19 (Entered basin) – December 22
- Peak intensity: 75 km/h (45 mph) (10-min); 990 hPa (mbar)

On December 19, the remnants of Tropical Cyclone Felicity, moved into the basin with 10-minute sustained windspeeds of 75 km/h (45 mph), which would have made it a category 1 tropical cyclone on the Australian scale. However, because it did not have the "classical characteristics of a tropical cyclone", it was treated as a tropical depression by the BoM and the FMS. Over the next couple of days, in response to an upper-level trough of low pressure weakening, the depression slowly weakened further, while accelerating to towards the southeast. Felicity was absorbed by a short-wave trough of low pressure to the north of New Zealand before it was last noted during December 22.

=== Coral Sea Depression ===
- Tropical depression (Australian scale)
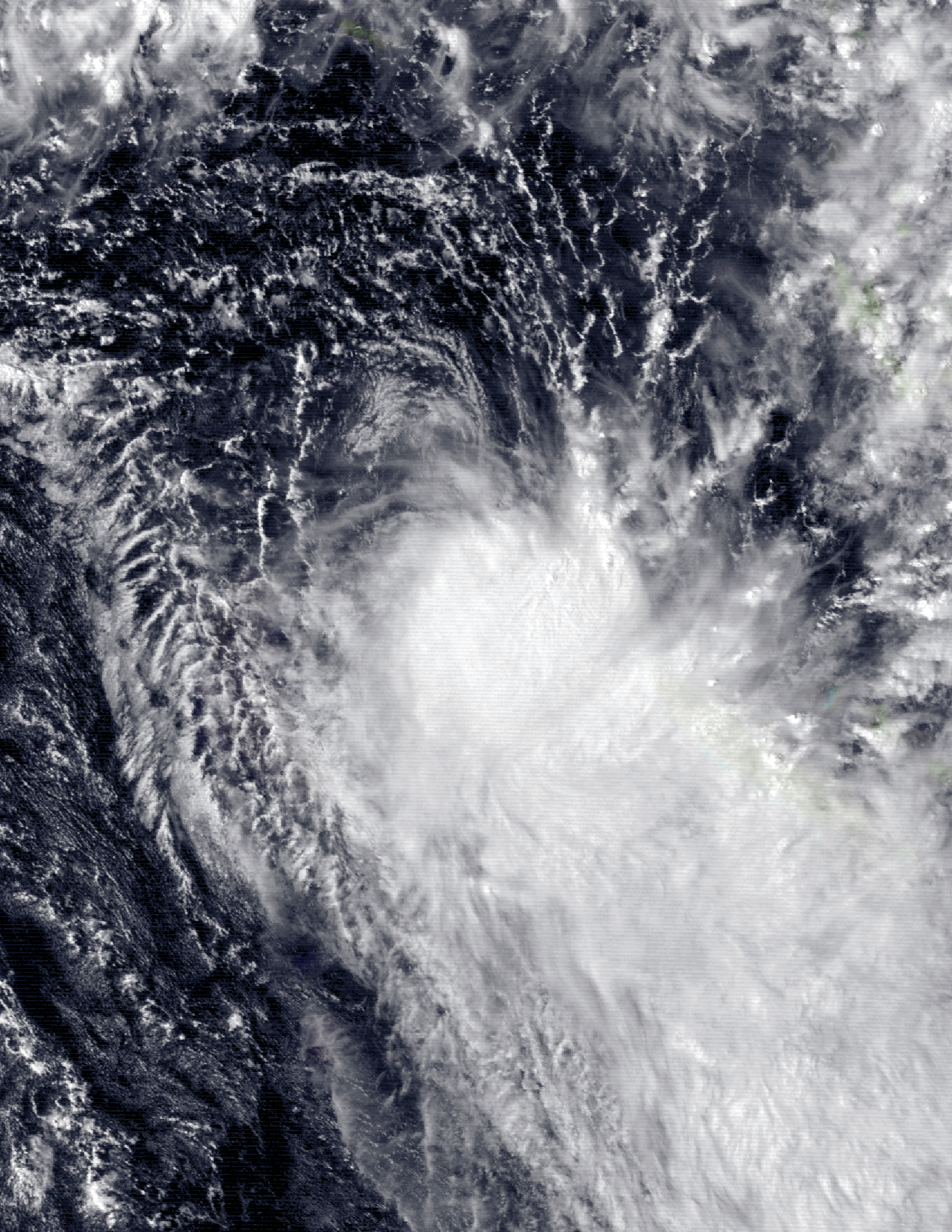
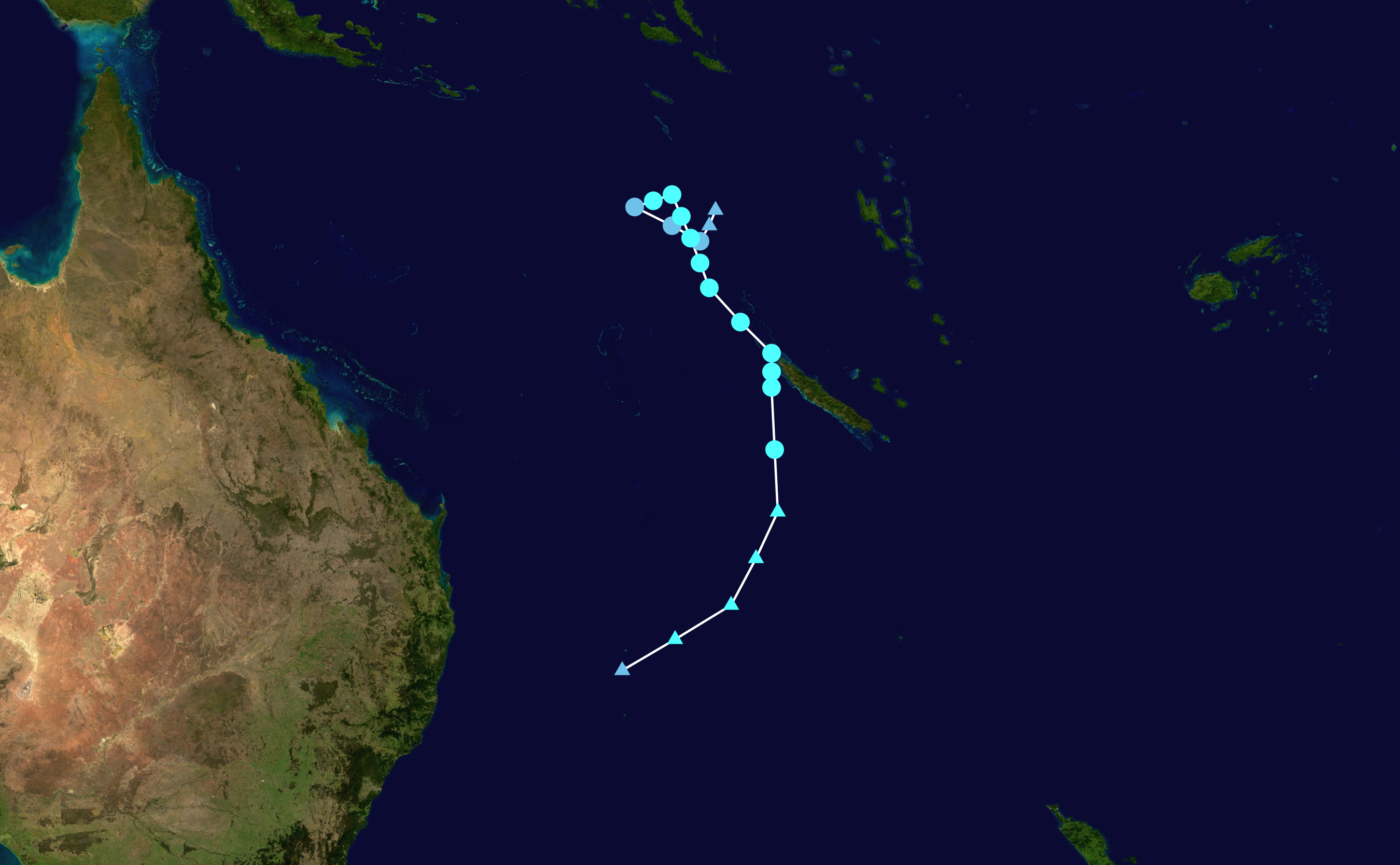
- Duration: January 20 – January 25
- Peak intensity: 85 km/h (50 mph) (10-min); 992 hPa (mbar)

On January 20, TCWC Nadi started to monitor a shallow area of low pressure that had developed within a trough of low pressure, about 600 mi (965 km) to the Northwest of Noumea in New Caledonia.

The depression was last noted on January 25, as it moved below 25°S and into MetService's area of responsibility.

There were no reports of any damage associated with this depression within New Caledonia, which was largely due to its small and not so intense nature of the system.

=== Severe Tropical Cyclone Ofa ===
- Category 4 severe tropical cyclone (Australian scale)
- Category 4 tropical cyclone (SSHWS)
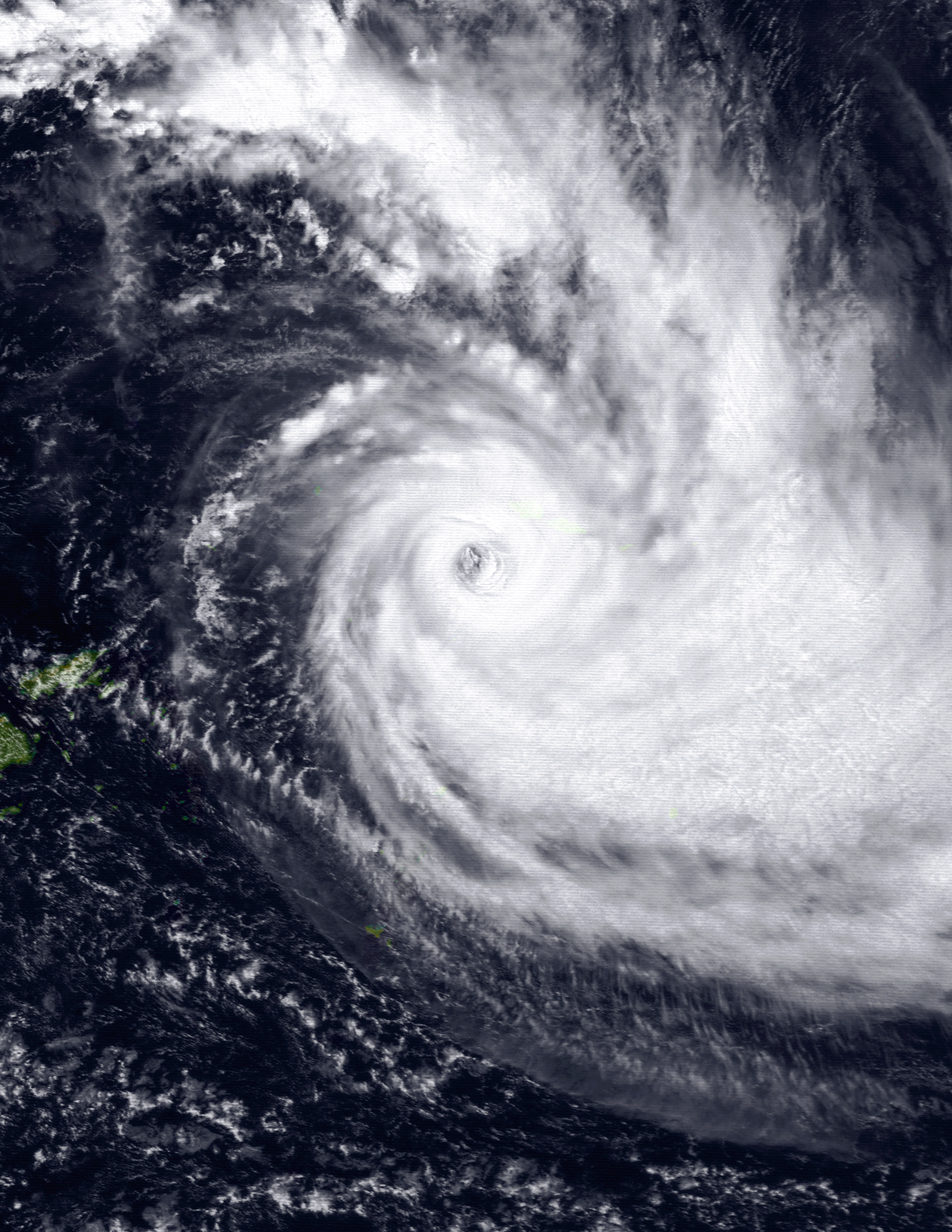
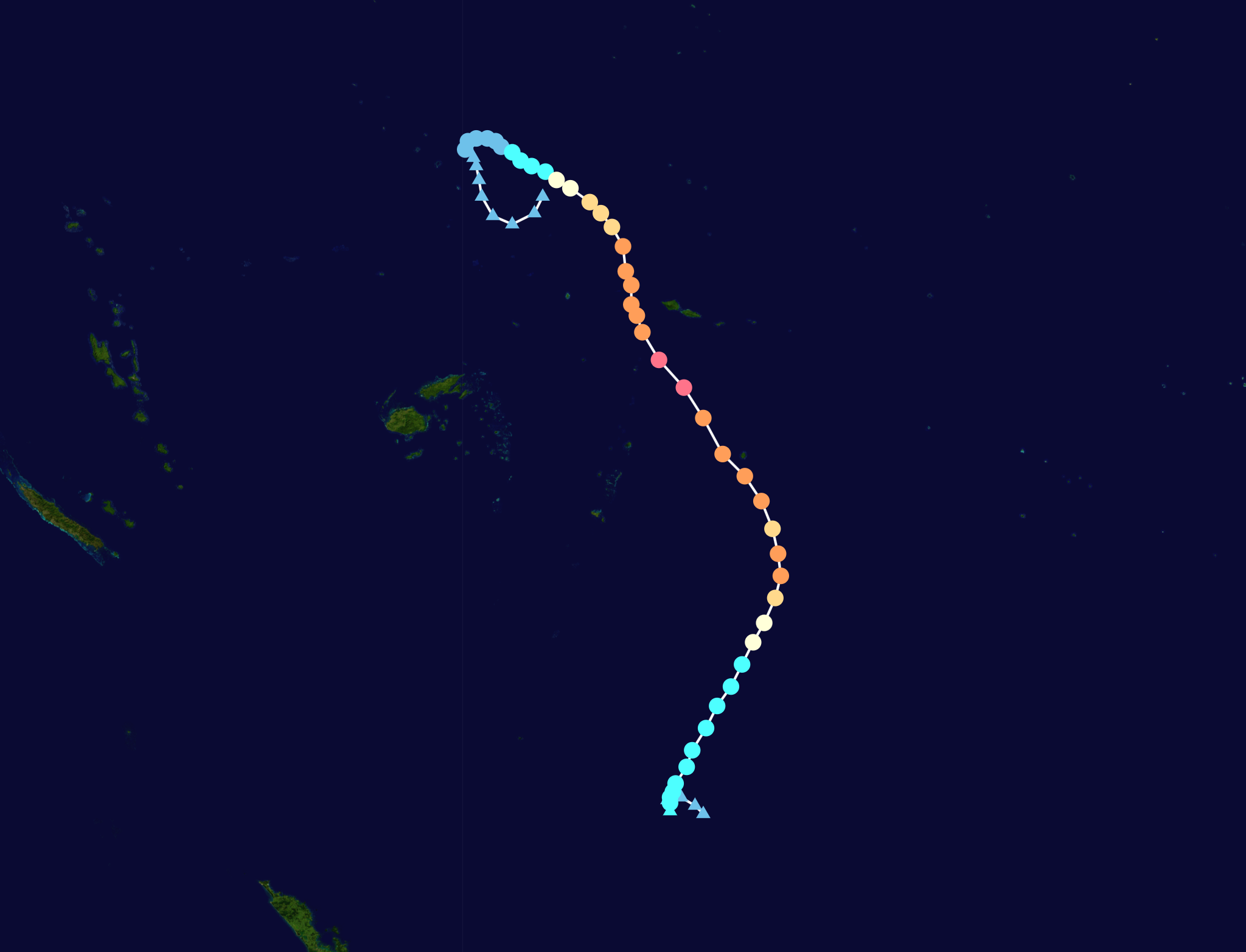
- Duration: January 27 – February 10
- Peak intensity: 185 km/h (115 mph) (10-min); 925 hPa (mbar)

On January 27, a shallow tropical depression formed within the South Pacific Convergence Zone, about 430 km (265 mi) to the southeast of Funafuti, Tuvalu. Over the next two days the system developed little and remained slow moving, near the Tuvaluan atoll of Funafuti. During January 30, the depression moved towards the north-east and started to organize, as pressures near the systems center rapidly falling. During the next day the system subsequently started to curve south-eastwards and away from Tuvalu, before the NWOC initiated advisories on the system and designated it as Tropical Cyclone 13P. Late on January 31, TCWC Nadi named the tropical depression Ofa, after it had developed into a category 1 tropical cyclone on the Australian scale. Over the few days the system moved towards the south-southeast and intensified further. Ofa subsequently passed about 110 km (70 mi) to the west of the Western Samoan Island of Savai'i between 10:00 and 18:00 UTC during February 3. Early the next day as the system started to accelerate towards the south-southeast towards the island nation of Niue, the NWOC estimated that Ofa had peaked with 1-minute sustained wind speeds of 215 km/h (130 mph), which made it equivalent to a category 4 hurricane on the SSHWS. Later that day TCWC Nadi also estimated that the system had peaked with 10-minute sustained wind speeds of 185 km/h (115 mph) as a category 4 severe tropical cyclone,. During February 5, the system passed about 55 km (35 mi) to the west of Niue, as it started to weaken and started to transition into an extratropical cyclone. The system completed this transition during February 8, before the remnants were last noted during February 10 after they had performed a small clockwise loop.

Cyclone Ofa affected seven different island nations and caused gales or much stronger winds in six of those countries which resulted in damage ranging from moderate to very severe. Storm tide from the cyclone which is the combined effect of storm surge and high tide caused havoc in several countries and was the major cause of destruction. Overall the system killed at least eight people while it was estimated that the overall damage would amount to over US$180 million with damage totals of at least US$150 million and US$30 million in Western and American Samoa.

=== Tropical Cyclone Nancy ===
- Category 2 tropical cyclone (Australian scale)
- Category 1 tropical cyclone (SSHWS)
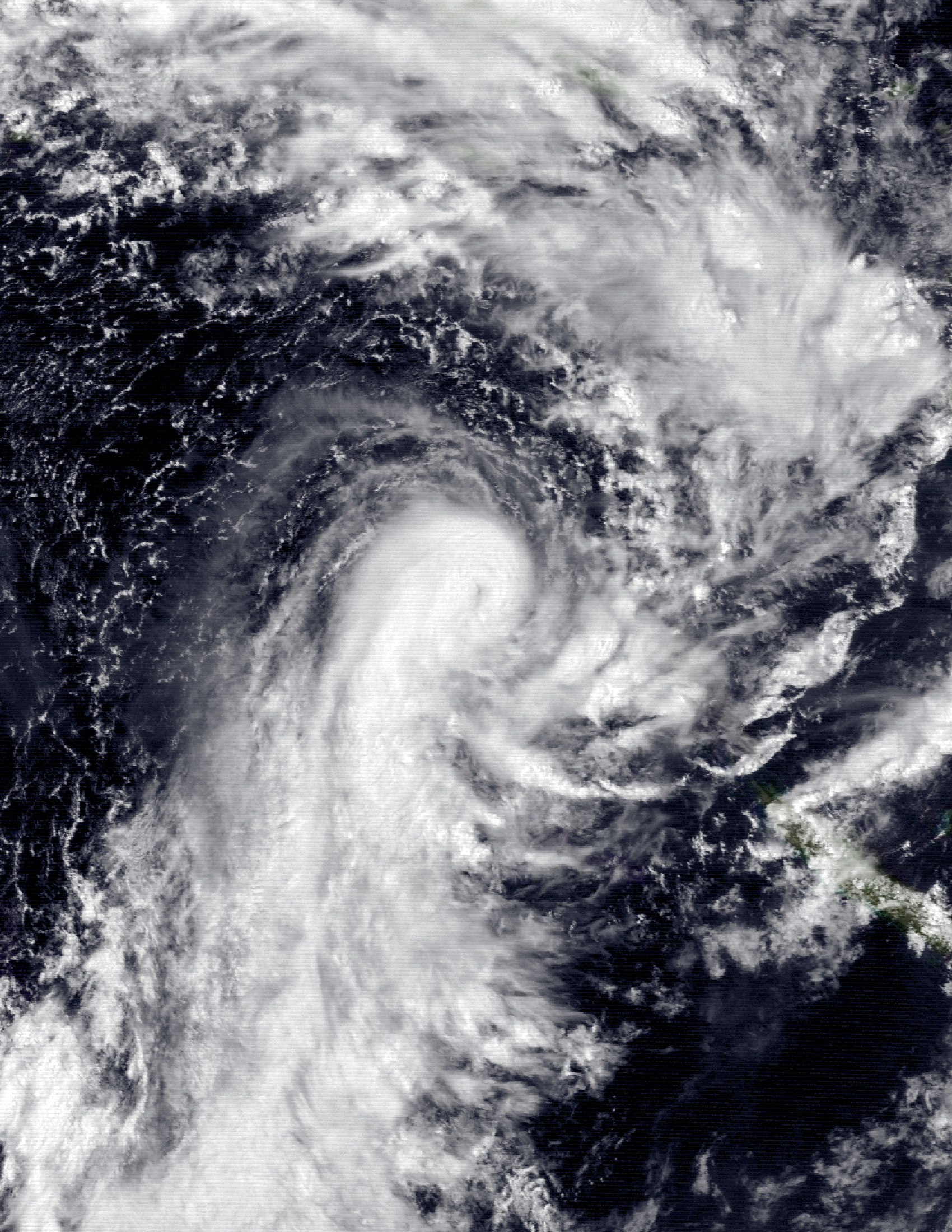
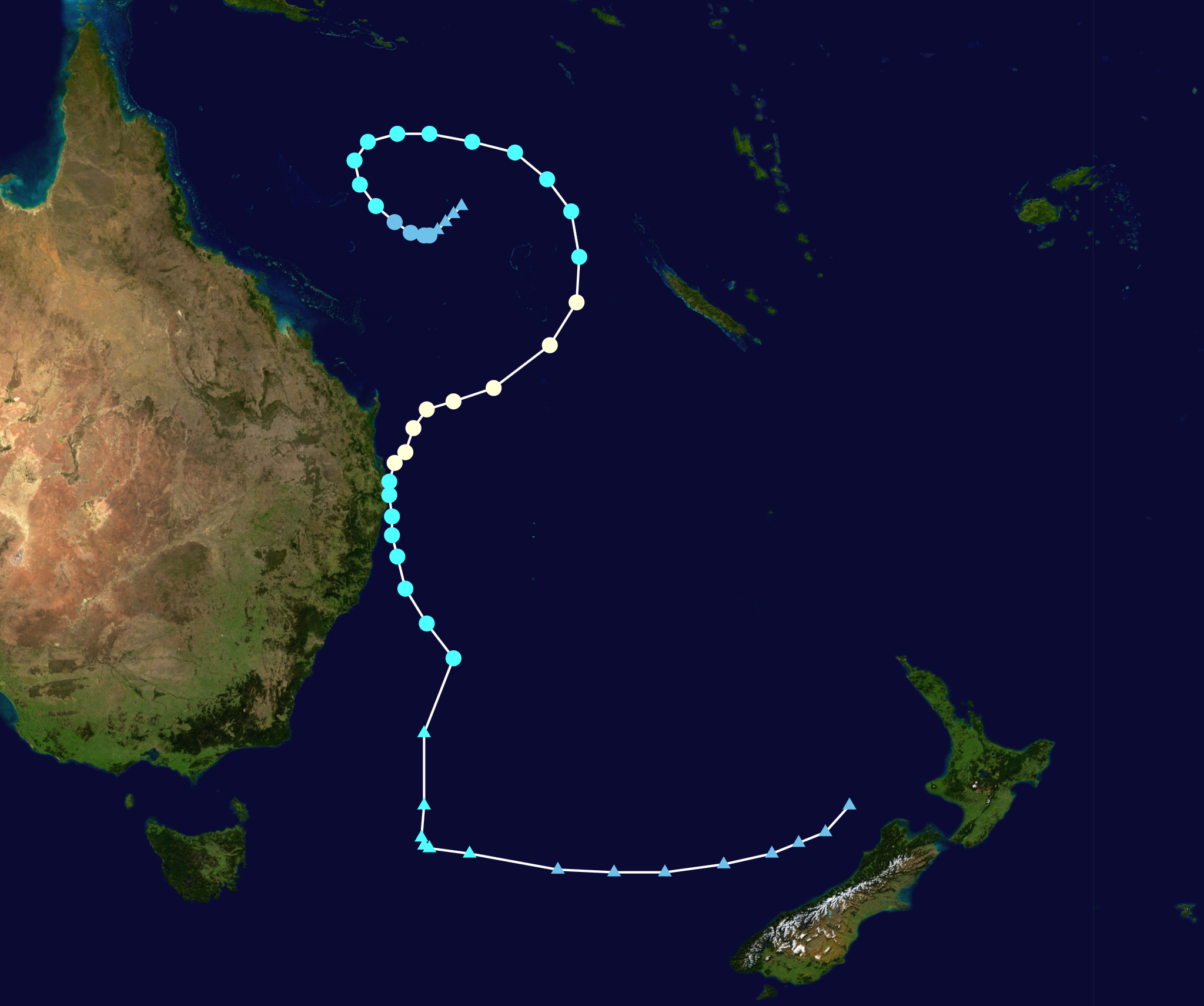
- Duration: January 31 (Entered basin) – February 1 (Exited basin)
- Peak intensity: 110 km/h (70 mph) (10-min); 980 hPa (mbar)

On January 31, the FMS reported that a tropical depression had moved south-eastwards into the basin from the Australian region and named it Nancy, after it had become a category 1 tropical cyclone on the Australian scale. During that day, Nancy recurved south-westwards around the southern extension of an upper-level trough of low pressure and moved back into the Australian region. The system subsequently re-entered the basin as an extratropical cyclone on February 6, before it dissipated to the west of New Zealand on February 8.

While the system was located within the basin, the FMS reported that the system had peaked as a category 1 tropical cyclone, with 10-minute sustained winds of 85 km/h (50 mph). The JTWC also monitored the system while it was in the basin and estimated that Nancy had peak 1-minute sustained winds of 120 km/h (75 mph), which made it equivalent to a category 1 hurricane on the SSHWS. The BoM later reanalysed the system and found that it had peaked as a category 2 tropical cyclone, with 10-minute sustained winds of 110 km/h (70 mph) while it was located within the basin.

=== Samoa Depression ===
- Tropical depression (Australian scale)
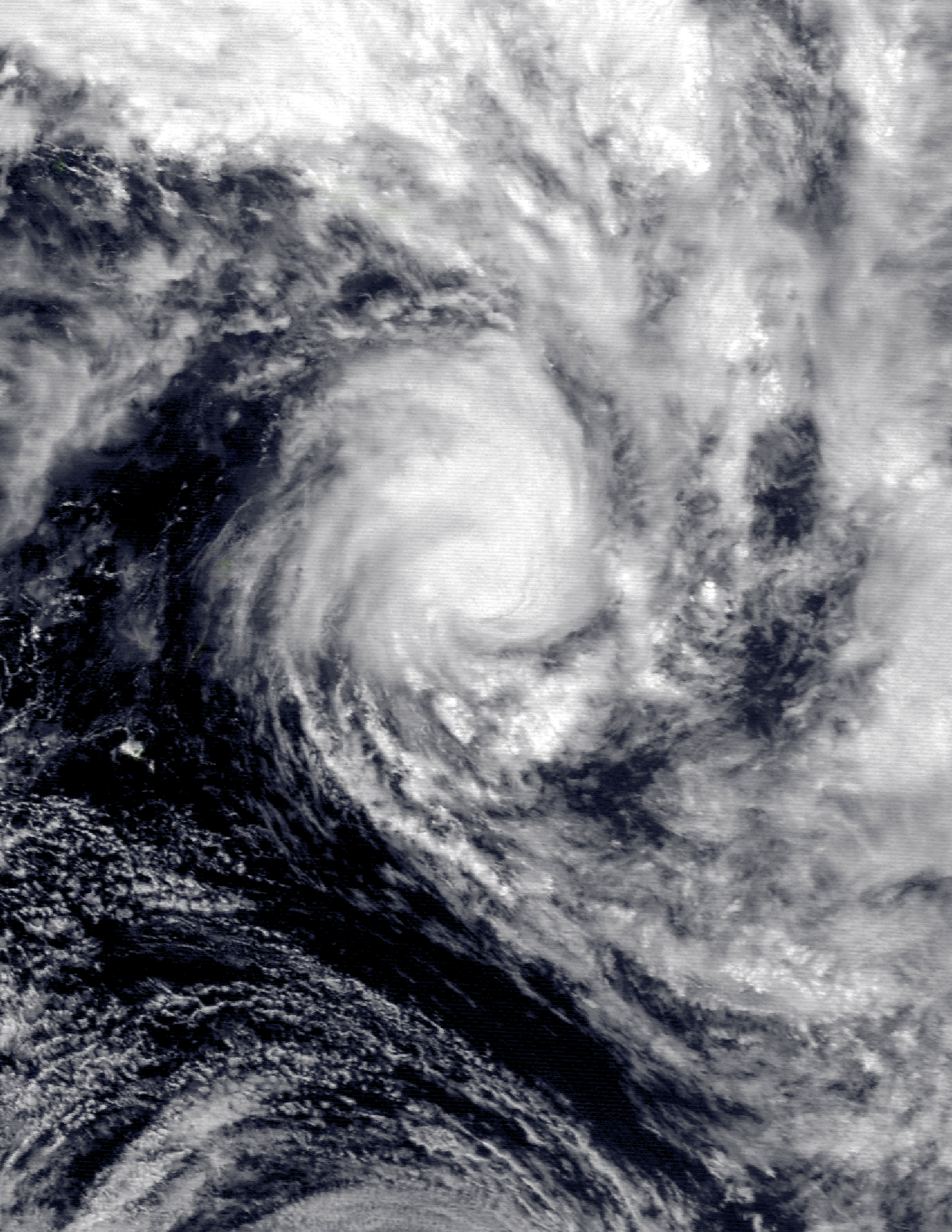
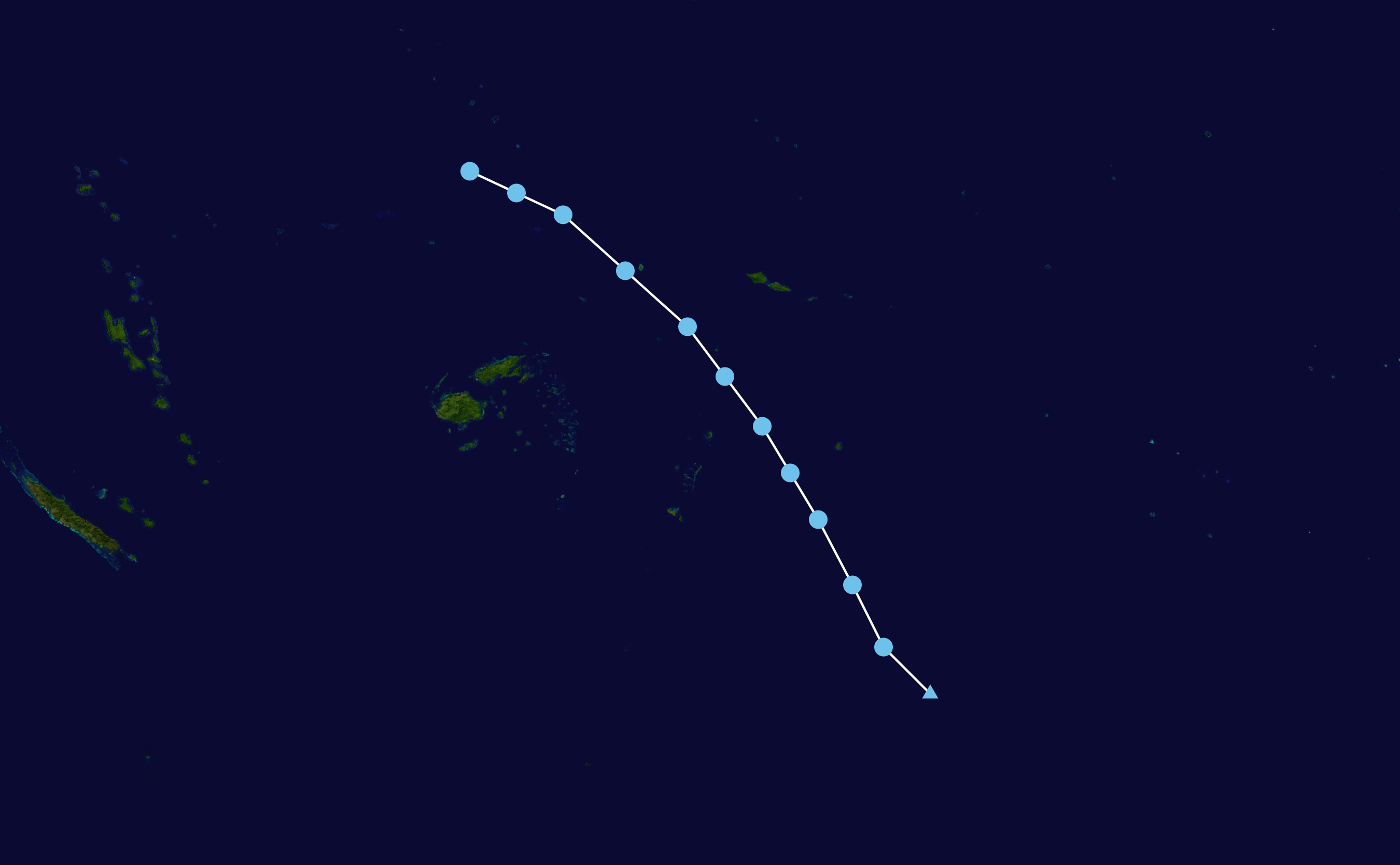
- Duration: February 6 – February 9
- Peak intensity: 65 km/h (40 mph) (10-min);

On February 6, the FMS reported that a depression had developed, within the South Pacific Convergence Zone near the islands of Tuvalu. Over the next few days the system was steered towards the southeast by a north-westerly steering flow on the eastern side of an upper-level trough of low pressure. As the depression moved towards the southeast it passed in between Western Samoa and the northern islands of Tonga before it came very close to Niue during February 8. Despite marginal gale-force winds being present in the depressions eastern quadrant, strong north-westerlies prevented the depression, from strengthening into a tropical cyclone. The depression was subsequently last noted during February 9, as it was absorbed into the Westerlies. The only damage that could be attributed to the depression is a number of houses that were destroyed on the Tuvaluan atoll of Vaitupu on February 6, however it is possible that the houses were destroyed by the strong and squally north-westerly winds that were prevailing over the northern islands of Tuvalu at that time. As Tuvalu, Western Samoa, American Samoa, Tonga, Niue had all been affected by Cyclone Ofa a few days earlier; any damage would have been difficult to assess.

=== Severe Tropical Cyclone Peni ===
- Category 3 severe tropical cyclone (Australian scale)
- Category 1 tropical cyclone (SSHWS)
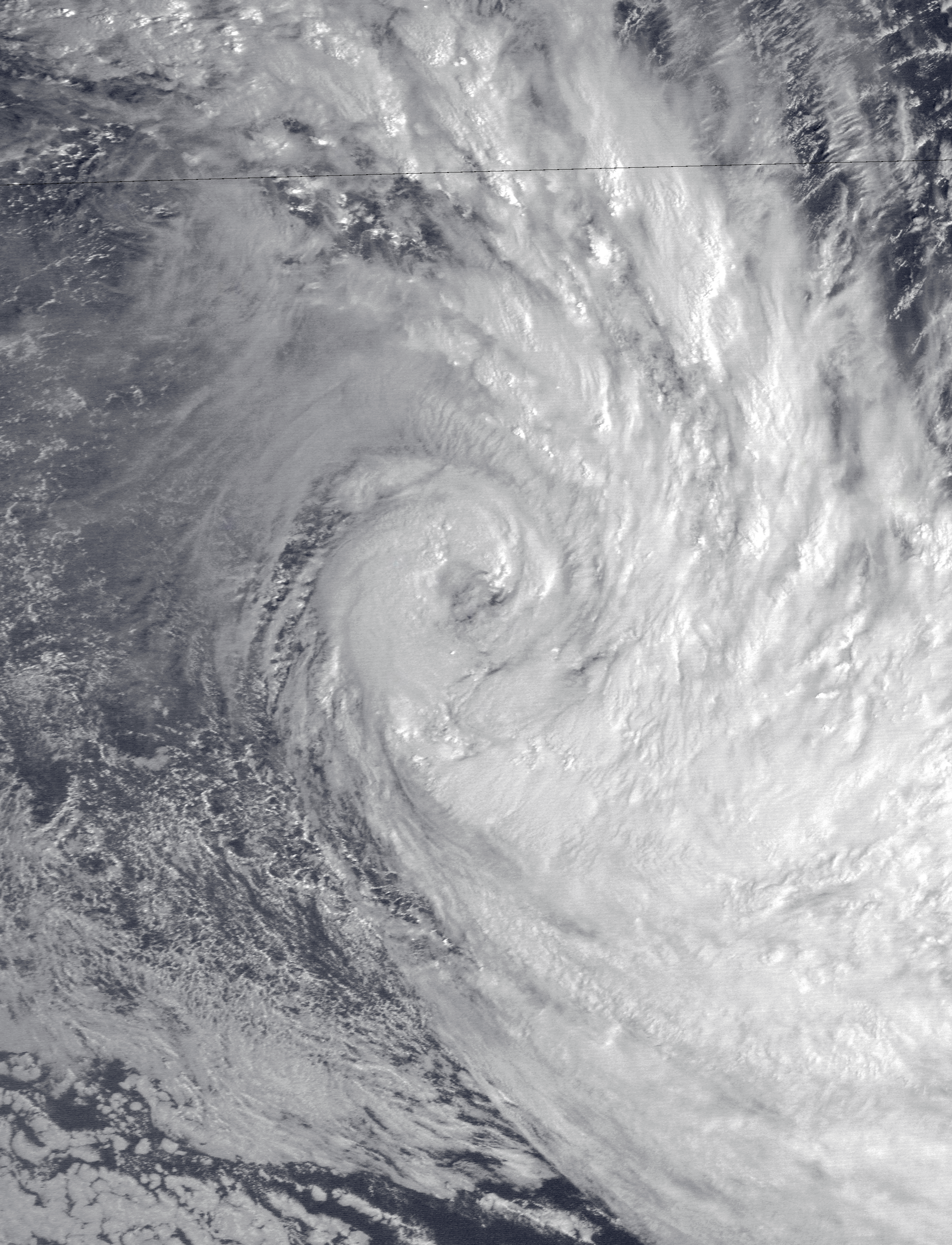
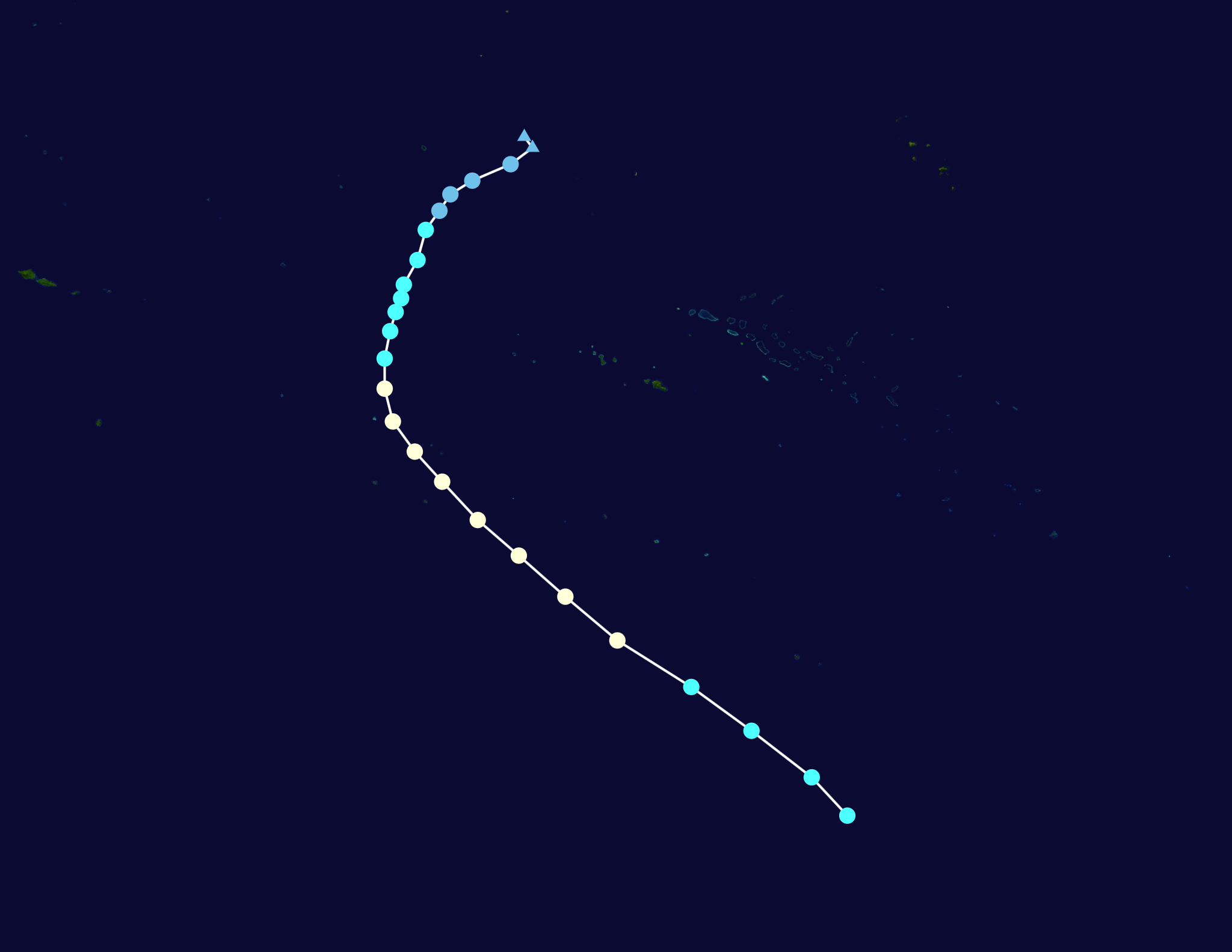
- Duration: February 12 – February 18
- Peak intensity: 120 km/h (75 mph) (10-min); 970 hPa (mbar)

A shallow area of low-pressure began to develop near Rakahanga, an island in the Cook Island chain. The storm had also formed on the South Pacific convergence zone. The storm was first recognized on February 12, and had received tropical cyclone characteristics on the 13th. At 21:00 UTC, the storm was recognized as Tropical Cyclone Peni. The storm then took a path southwest towards the Cook Islands, Peni made a narrow turn and passed close to Aitutaki. Peni had gained hurricane status on the 15th, at 06:00 UTC. Peni had been able to keep hurricane characteristics until February 17, when it was downgraded to a storm, and soon, was declared extratropical. The name Peni was retired from the naming list.

=== Tropical Cyclone Hilda ===
- Category 2 tropical cyclone (Australian scale)
- Tropical storm (SSHWS)
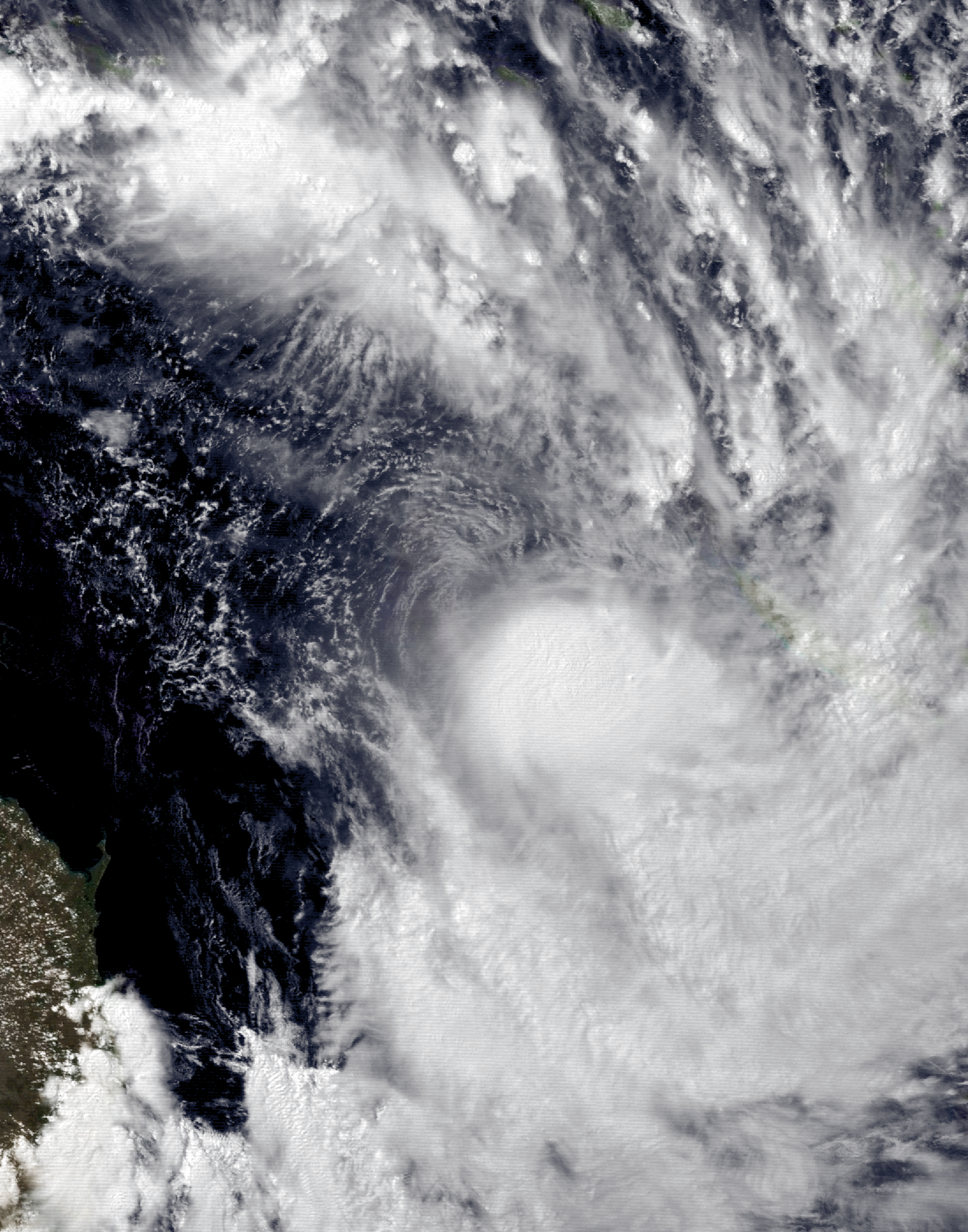
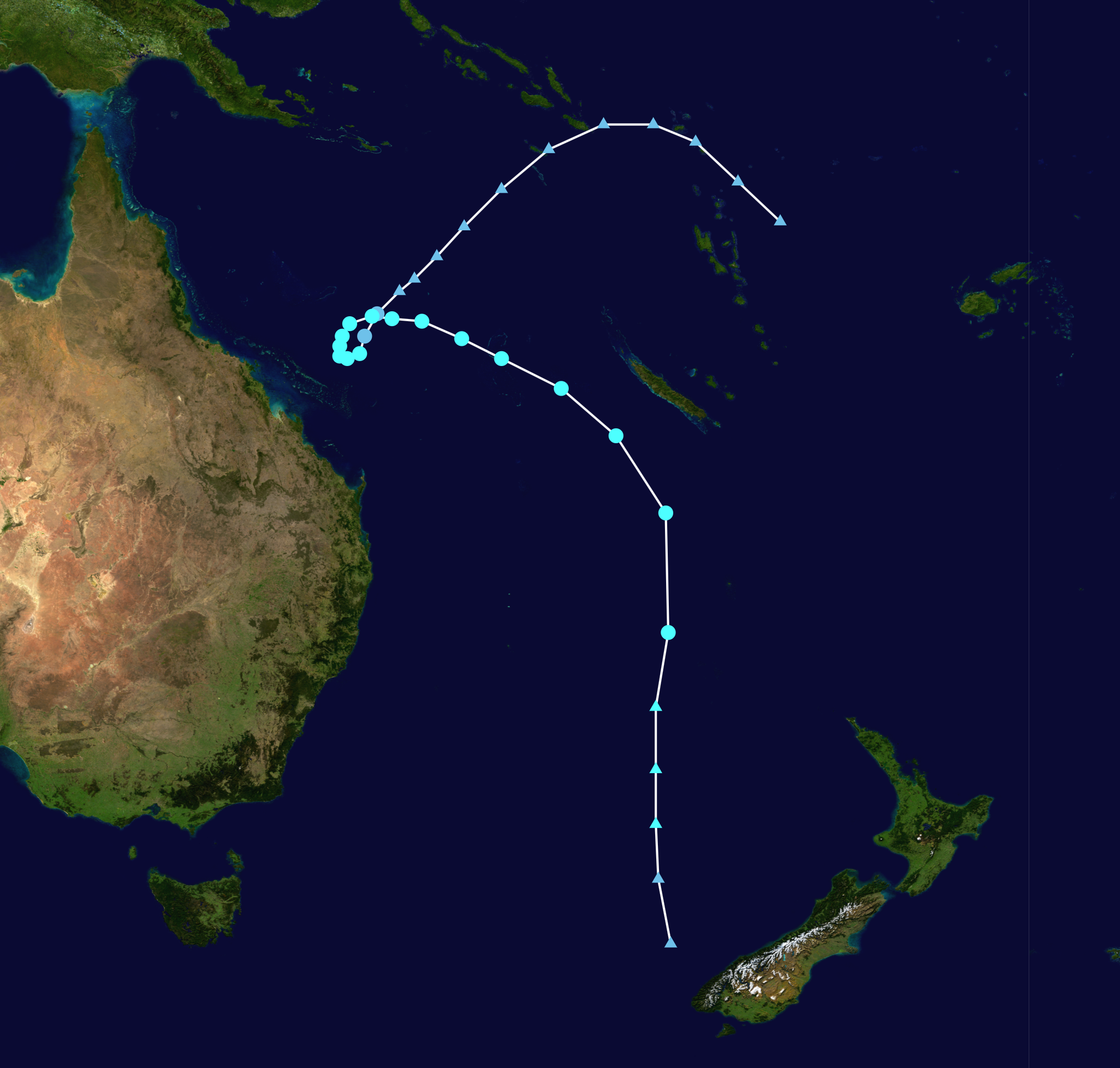
- Duration: March 7 (Entered basin) – March 7
- Peak intensity: 95 km/h (60 mph) (10-min); 985 hPa (mbar)

During March 7, Tropical Cyclone Hilda moved into the basin from the Australian region, as a category 2 tropical cyclone while it was located about 640 km (400 mi) to the northeast of Noumea, New Caledonia. During that day, the system passed about 640 km (400 mi) to the south-west of New Caledonia, as it moved south-southwestwards and degenerated into an extratropical depression. Over the next couple of days, the system moved through the Tasman Sea and passed near New Zealand's South Island, before it was absorbed into a high-latitude trough of low pressure.

=== Tropical Depression Ivor ===
- Tropical depression (Australian scale)
- Tropical depression (SSHWS)
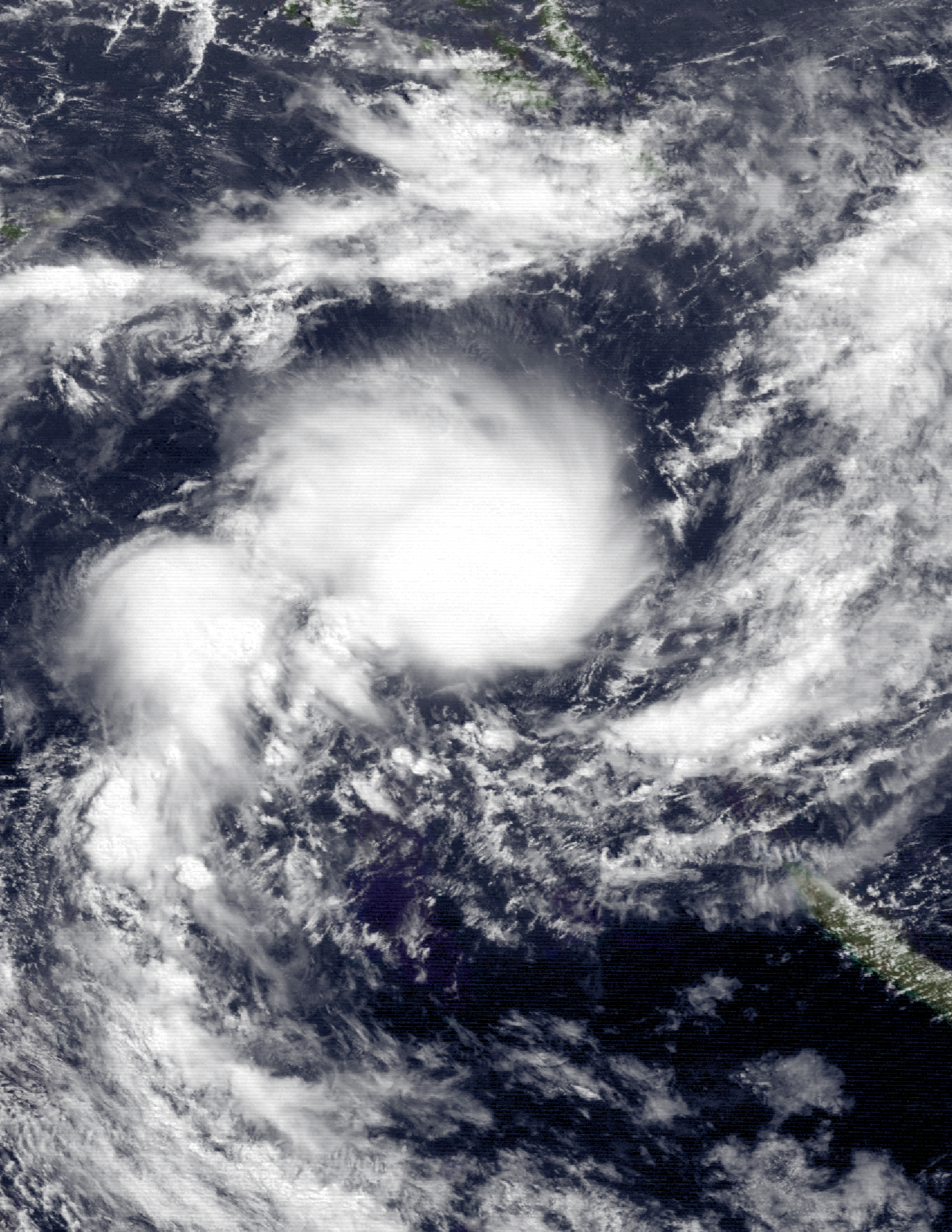
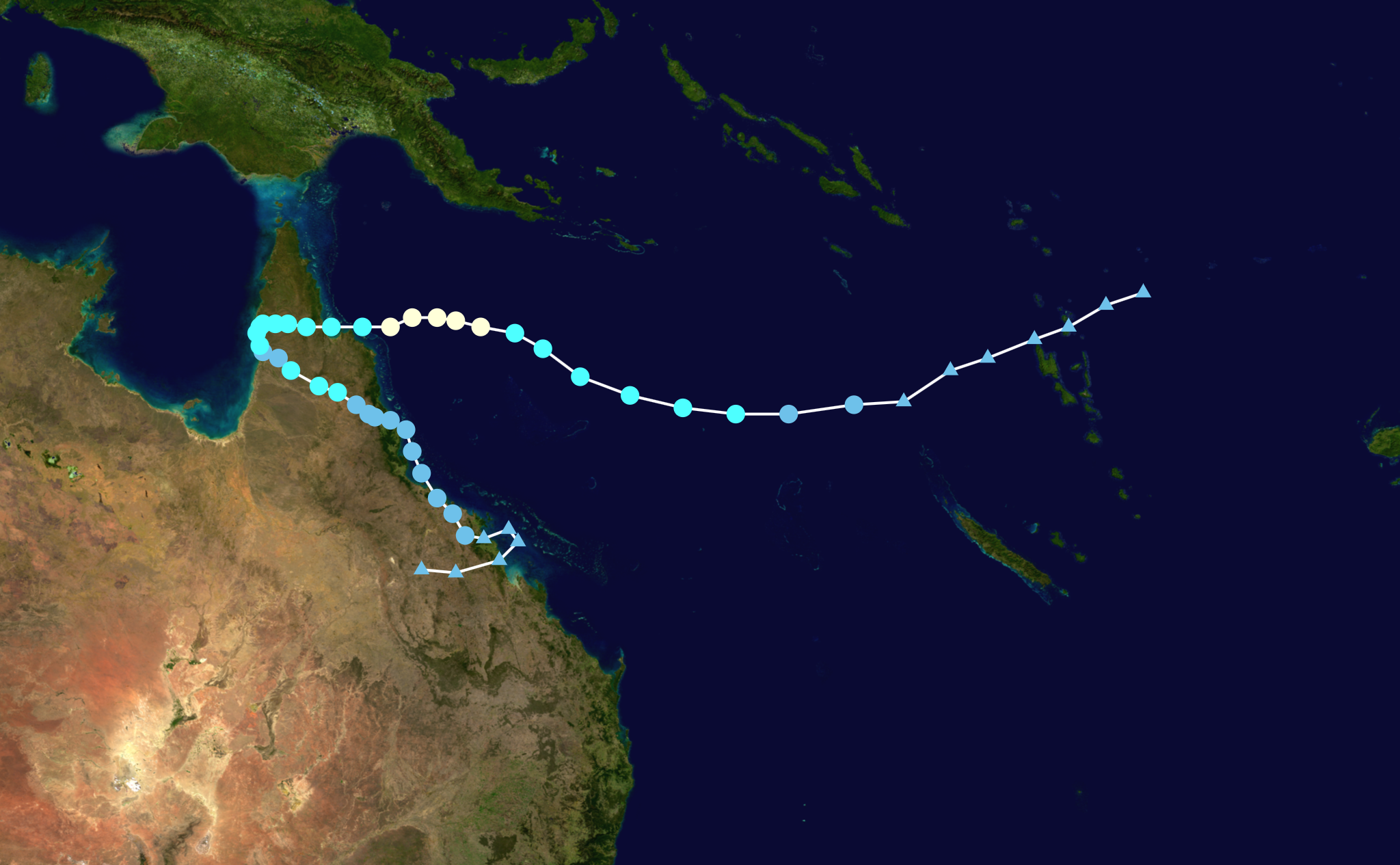
- Duration: March 14 – March 16 (Exited basin)
- Peak intensity: 55 km/h (35 mph) (10-min); 995 hPa (mbar)

On March 15, the precursor shallow tropical depression to Cyclone Ivor developed within the South Pacific convergence zone, about 390 km (240 mi) to the northeast of Port Villa in Vanuatu. During that day, the low moved towards the southwest and moved into the Australian region where it developed into Tropical Cyclone Ivor during March 16.

=== Tropical Cyclone Rae ===
- Category 2 tropical cyclone (Australian scale)
- Tropical storm (SSHWS)
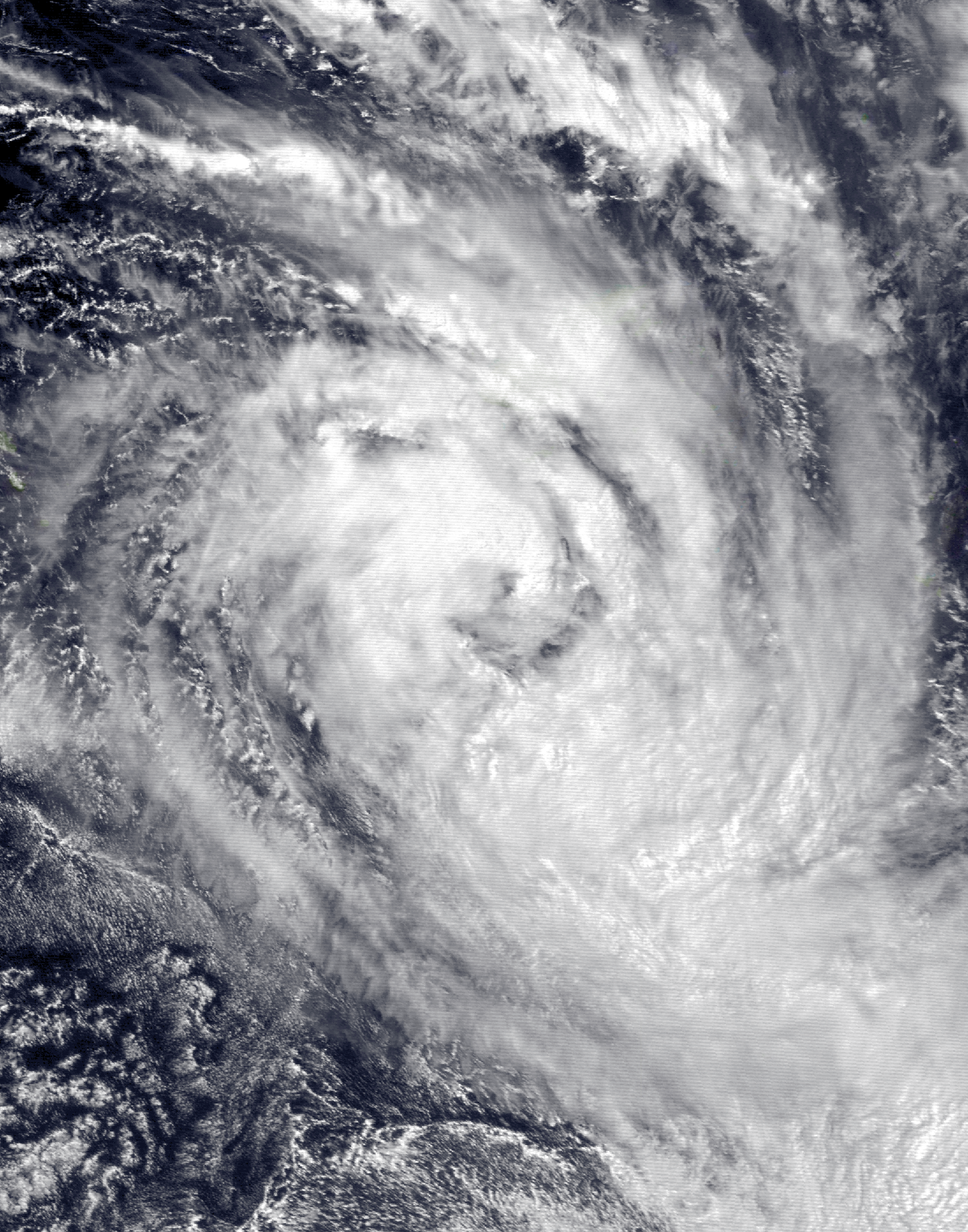
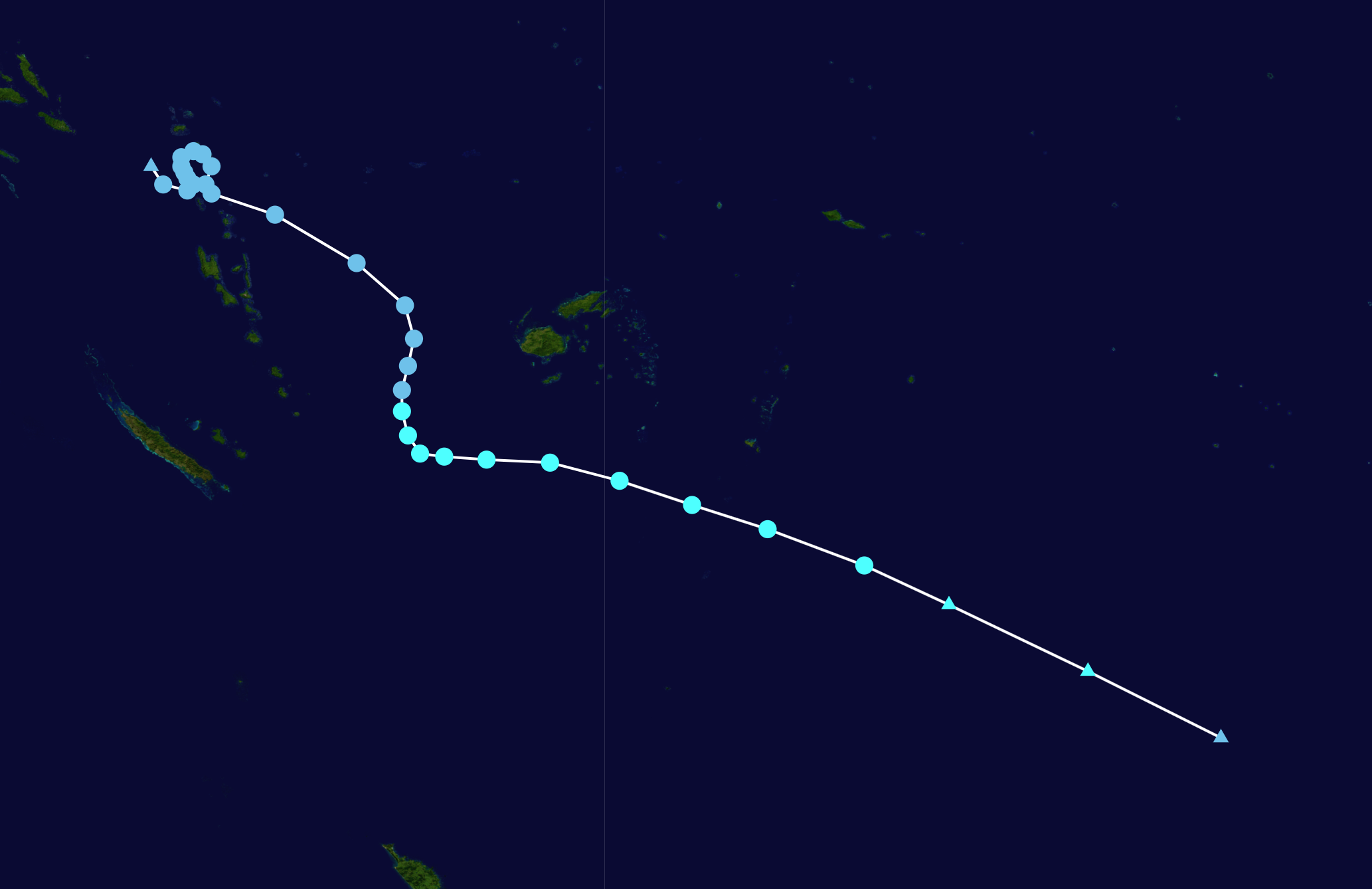
- Duration: March 16 – March 24
- Peak intensity: 95 km/h (60 mph) (10-min); 985 hPa (mbar)

During March 16, the FMS started to monitor a shallow tropical depression, that had developed within the South Pacific Convergence Zone in between Vanuatu and Fiji. Over the next couple of days, the system caused strong winds and heavy rain over the island nation of Tuvalu, as it slowly moved south-eastwards, before it passed around 110 km (70 mi) to the east of Rotuma. During March 19, Rae started to impact Fiji with heavy rain and strong winds as it slowed down and started to move south-westwards, before it passed around 75 km (45 mi) to the west of the Yasawa Islands during March 20. The depression continued to move south-westwards for the next 30 hours, before it curved southwards as it started to intensify slowly. During March 22, the JTWC initiated advisories on the system and designated it as Tropical Cyclone 26P, before the FMS named the system Rae later that day, after it had accelerated eastwards.

The JTWC and the FMS both estimated during March 23, that the system had peaked with winds of 95 km/h (60 mph), which made it a Category 2 tropical cyclone on the Australian Scale. At this time, the system was located about 225 km (140 mi) to the south of Kadavu in Fiji and had started to move south-eastwards towards higher latitudes. Rae subsequently weakened as it experienced stronger vertical windshear and cooler sea surface temperatures, which caused the system to weaken and lose its tropical characteristics. The system degenerated into a depression during March 24, as it maintained its south-eastwards track, before it dissipated to the south of Niue during the next day. The system impacted Fiji between March 19 - 24, where it caused strong winds and landslides, as well as minor damage to trees, houses and crops. Torrential rain associated with the system helped to ease a drought and caused flooding to be reported across the archipelago. Within the island nation, the floods were responsible for three deaths in flooded rivers, as well as disruption to transport services, water and electricity supplies. Between March 23 - 24, Rae caused strong winds and high seas at the wave rider buoy at Tongatapu, Tonga, where waves of 6 m (20 ft) were recorded as the winds changed direction.

== Season effects ==
This table lists all the storms that developed in the South Pacific basin during the 1989–90 season. It includes their intensity on the Australian Tropical cyclone intensity scale, duration, name, areas affected, deaths, and damages.

Name	Dates	Peak intensity			Areas affected	Damage (USD)	Deaths	Ref(s).
Name	Dates	Category	Wind speed	Pressure	Areas affected	Damage (USD)	Deaths	Ref(s).
Cook Islands	November 8 – 10	Tropical Depression	Not Specified	Not Specified	Southern Cook Islands			
Samoa	December 14 – 17	Tropical Depression	Not Specified	Not Specified	Samoan Islands			
Felicity	December 19 – 22	Tropical Depression	75 km/h (45 mph)	990 hPa (29.24 inHg)	Norfolk Island			
Coral Sea	January 20 – 25	Tropical Depression	75 km/h (45 mph)	Not Specified	New Caledonia	None	None	
Ofa	January 27 – February 10	Category 4 severe tropical cyclone	185 km/h (115 mph)	925 hPa (27.32 inHg)	Polynesia	$187 million	8	
Nancy	January 31 – February 1	Category 2 tropical cyclone	110 km/h (70 mph)	980 hPa (28.94 inHg)	None	None	None	
Samoa	February 6 – 9	Tropical Depression	65 km/h (40 mph)	Not Specified	Polynesia	Unknown	None	
Peni	February 12 – 18	Category 3 severe tropical cyclone	120 km/h (75 mph)	970 hPa (28.64 inHg)	Cook Islands			
Hilda	March 7 – 9	Category 2 tropical cyclone	95 km/h (60 mph)	985 hPa (29.10 inHg)	Tuvalu, Vanuatu, New Caledonia			
Ivor	March 14 – 16	Tropical Depression	Not Specified	Not Specified	None	None	None	
Rae	March 16 – 25	Category 2 tropical cyclone	95 km/h (60 mph)	985 hPa (29.09 inHg)	Tuvalu, Fiji, Tonga	US$26.2 million	3	
Season aggregates
11 systems	November 8 – March 25		185 km/h (115 mph)	925 hPa (27.32 inHg)		>$187 million	11	
