= 1994–95 South Pacific cyclone season =

Tropical cyclone season

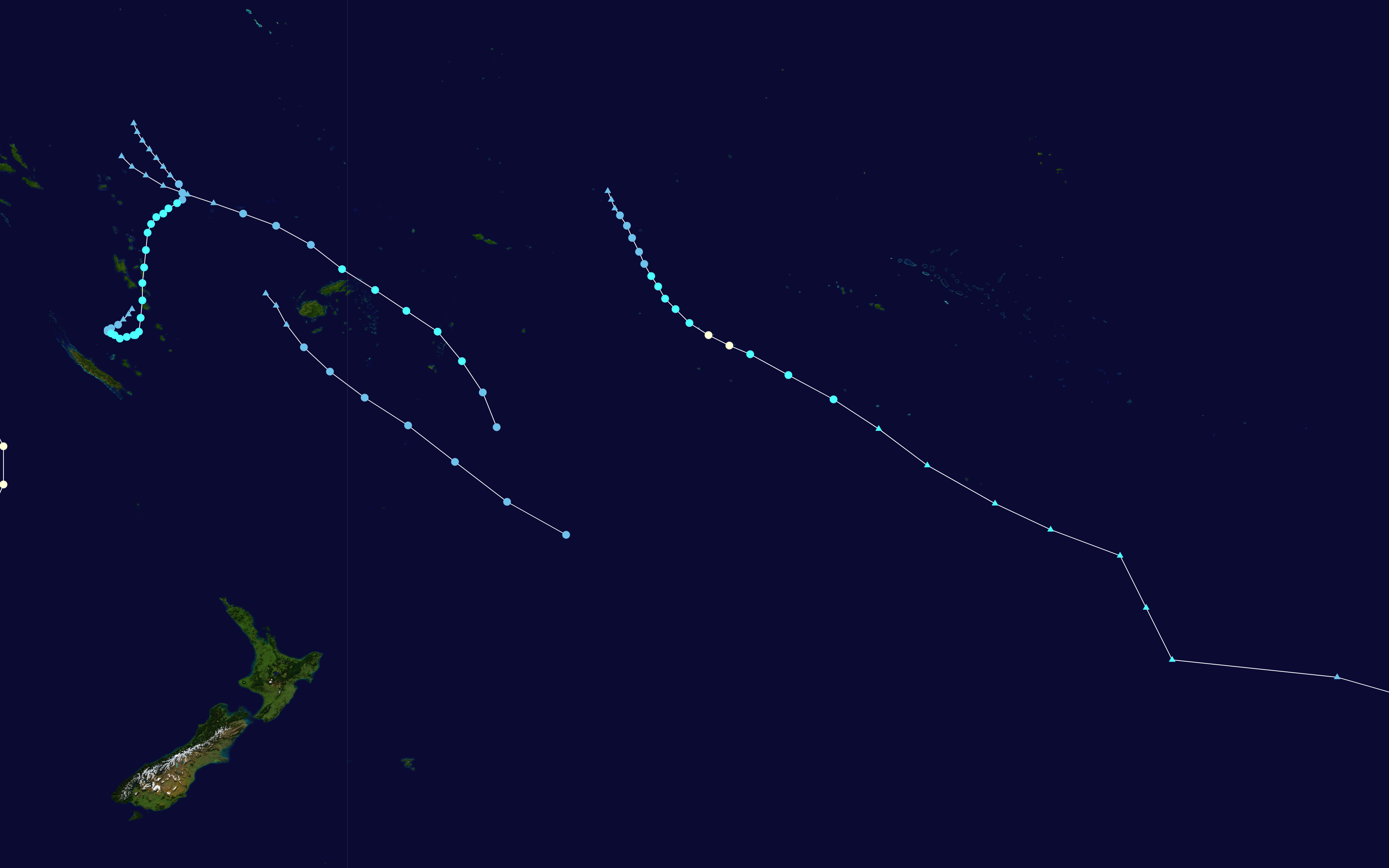
- Season summary map

Seasonal boundaries
- First system formed: November 12, 1994
- Last system dissipated: March 5, 1995

Strongest storm
- Name: Violet
  - Maximum winds: 130 km/h (80 mph) (10-minute sustained)
  - Lowest pressure: 970 hPa (mbar)

Seasonal statistics
- Total depressions: 4 official, 1 unofficial
- Tropical cyclones: 3
- Severe tropical cyclones: 1
- Total fatalities: None reported
- Total damage: $2.5 million (1995 USD)

Related articles
- 1994–95 South-West Indian Ocean cyclone season; 1994–95 Australian region cyclone season

The 1994–95 South Pacific cyclone season was one of the least active South Pacific tropical cyclone seasons on record, with only four tropical cyclones officially occurring within the South Pacific Ocean basin between 160°E and 120°W. The season ran from November 1, 1994, until April 30, 1995, with the first disturbance of the season developing on November 12 and the last disturbance leaving the base on March 5. The most intense tropical cyclone during the season was Tropical Cyclone Violet, which briefly existed within the basin. After the season, the name William was retired from the tropical cyclone naming lists.

During the season, tropical cyclones were officially monitored by the Fiji Meteorological Service, New Zealand's MetService, and Australia's Bureau of Meteorology. Throughout the season, the United States Navy also monitored the basin and issued unofficial warnings through its Joint Typhoon Warning Center (JTWC) and Naval Pacific Meteorology and Oceanography Center (NPMOC). Tropical cyclones that were located between the Equator and 25°S were monitored by the FMS, while any that were located to the south of 25°S were monitored by MetService. During the season, the JTWC issued warnings on any tropical cyclone that was located between 160°E and 180° while the NPMOC issued warnings for tropical cyclones forming between 180° and the American coast. The FMS, MetService, and BoM all used the Australian Tropical Cyclone Intensity Scale and measured windspeeds over a 10-minute period, while the JTWC and the NPMOC measured sustained windspeeds over a 1-minute period.

== Seasonal summary ==
The season was one of the most inactive tropical cyclone seasons on record, with only four tropical cyclones officially occurring within the South Pacific Ocean basin between 160°E and 120°W. The first tropical depression of the season developed out of an area of convection on November 12 to the northeast of Vanuatu, before it was named Vania on November 14 after it had become a Category 1 tropical cyclone. The cyclone went on to end a long dry spell in Vanuatu before it was last noted on November 19 to the west of Port Vila, Vanuatu. The basin remained quiet until December 13, when Tropical Depression 04P developed to the east of the Solomon Islands before going on to affect Fiji and Tonga. During the final days of 1994, several areas of low pressure developed within the South Pacific Convergence Zone between 8°S and 16°S, and 180°W and 160°W. During December 30, one of these areas of low pressure developed into a tropical depression within the northern Cook Islands, just to the east of Pukapuka Atoll. Over the next couple of days, the depression moved southeastwards towards the Southern Cook Islands and gradually developed into Tropical Cyclone William. Throughout its lifetime, William moved southeast and affected parts of French Polynesia and the Cook Islands before becoming extratropical on January 3. After William left the basin on January 5, the basin remained quiet until March 6, when Severe Tropical Cyclone Violet briefly crossed into MetService's area before crossing back to the BoM's area hours later.

After the season had ended, the name William was retired from the tropical cyclone naming lists due to its destructive effects. In 1995, the World Meteorological Organization designated the FMS as a Regional Specialized Meteorological Center.

== Systems ==
=== Tropical Cyclone Vania ===
- Category 2 tropical cyclone (Australian scale)
- Tropical storm (SSHWS)
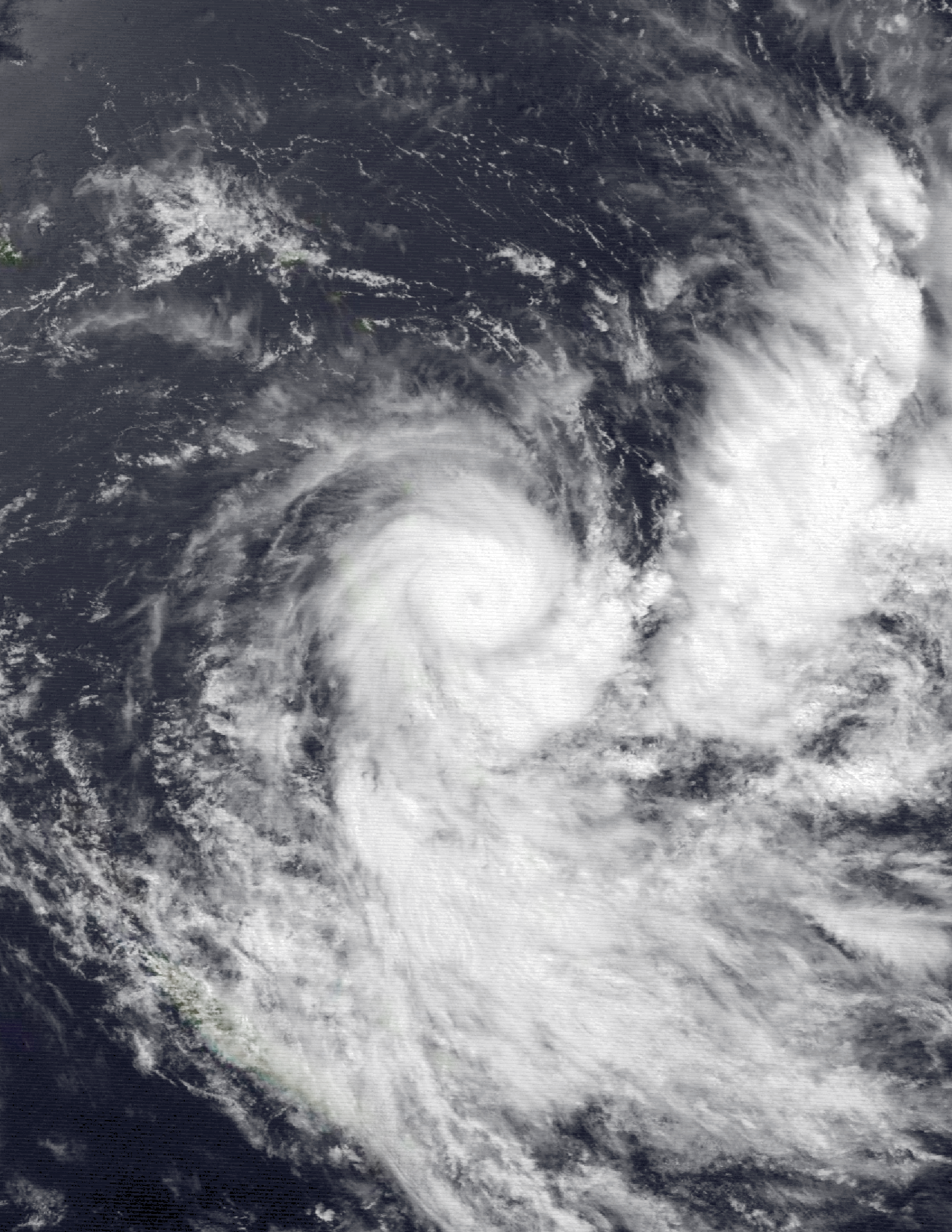
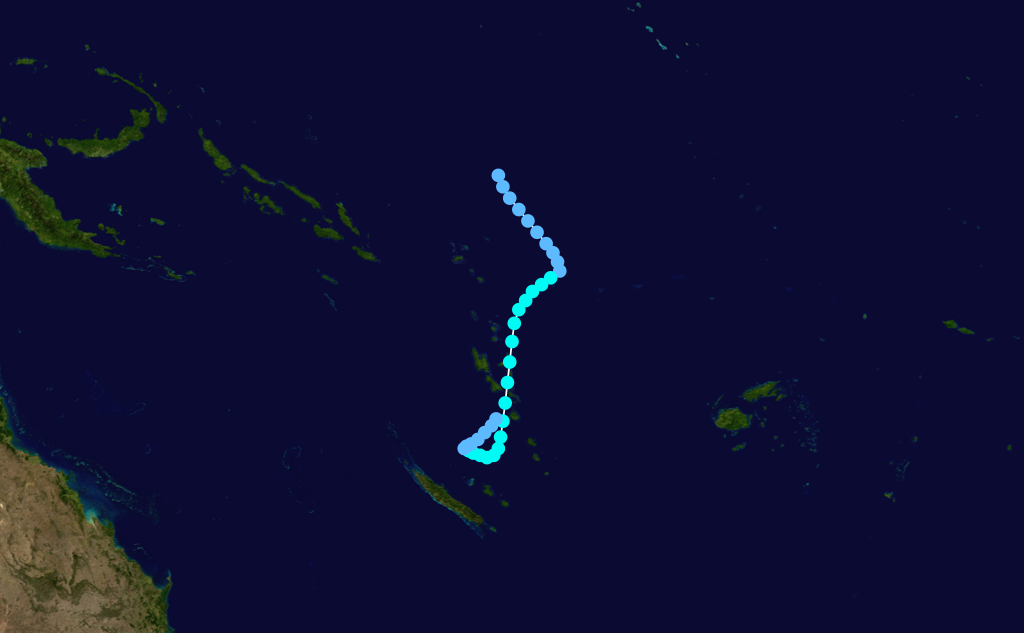
- Duration: November 10 – November 19
- Peak intensity: 100 km/h (65 mph) (10-min); 980 hPa (mbar)

A persistent cloud mass east of the Solomon Islands evolved into a tropical depression on November 12, according to the FMS. Located about 245 km (150 mi) northeast of Tikopia, the system had gale-force winds developing on its southern side. The depression moved south-eastwards at first, before it turned southwestwards through Temotu Province towards Vanuatu, which prompted the FMS to start issuing special weather bulletins for the island nation during November 13. Later that day, the JTWC initiated advisories, designating it Tropical Cyclone 01P. On November 14, the FMS named the system Vania, after it had become a category 1 tropical cyclone on the Australian scale. Intensifying further, Vania moved through northern Vanuatu on November 15 as a category 2 tropical cyclone. Later that day, the FMS predicted that Vania would become a hurricane and issued a hurricane warning; however, Vania had peaked as a category 2 tropical cyclone with peak 10-minute sustained windspeeds of between 100 km/h (65 mph), while the JTWC estimated that the system had peaked with 1-minute sustained windspeeds of 110 km/h (70 mph). Over the next couple of days, the system stalled and started to move westwards, before the FMS and JTWC issued their final advisories on the cyclone during November 18, as it had weakened below tropical cyclone intensity and degenerated into a sheared depression to the north of New Caledonia. The remnant low-level circulation was last noted during November 19, while they were located about 80 km (50 mi) to the west of Port Vila.

Within Vanuatu, preparations had been completed for a storm-force cyclone, before the FMS issued a hurricane warning at 18:15 VUT (07:15 UTC) on November 15, which prompted a higher response from the residents of the island nation. The warning proved problematic as it was issued just after it had gone dark, which caused the higher response to be done in darkness when the winds were becoming stronger, which endangered residents. It was later realised that the hurricane warning should not have been issued, as only storm-force winds were experienced over Vanuatu, while various weather stations reported winds below 75 km/h (45 mph). Overall, the system had a minimal impact on the island nation, with damage reported to crops and bush houses, while heavy rain associated with the cyclone helped break a long dry spell of weather in Vanuatu. Vania also brought rain to parts of Fiji that were responsible for severe flooding within Tailevu Province, which in turn caused over 100 hectares (250 acres) of crops to be damaged and the deaths of a significant number of farm animals.

=== Tropical Depression 04P ===
- Tropical depression (Australian scale)
- Tropical storm (SSHWS)
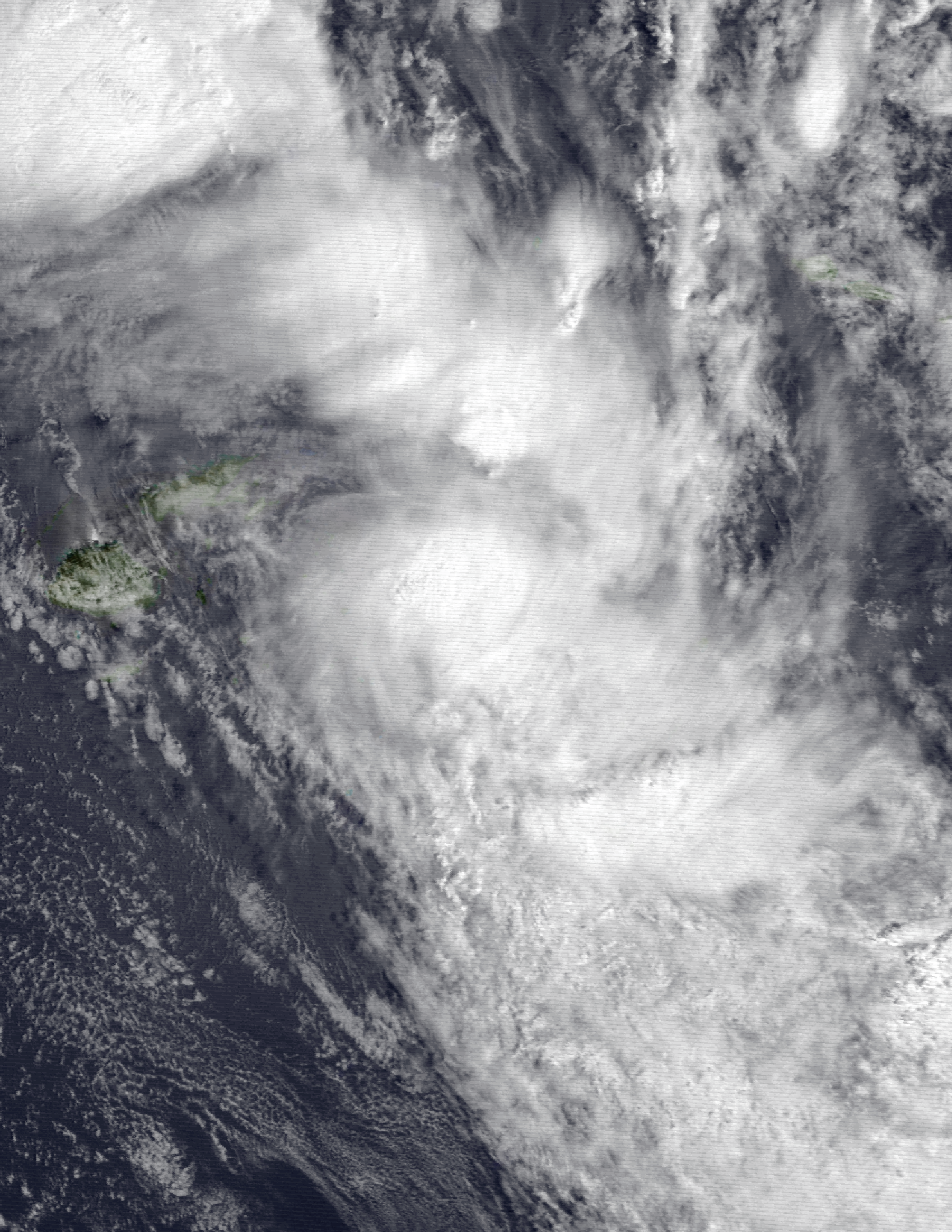
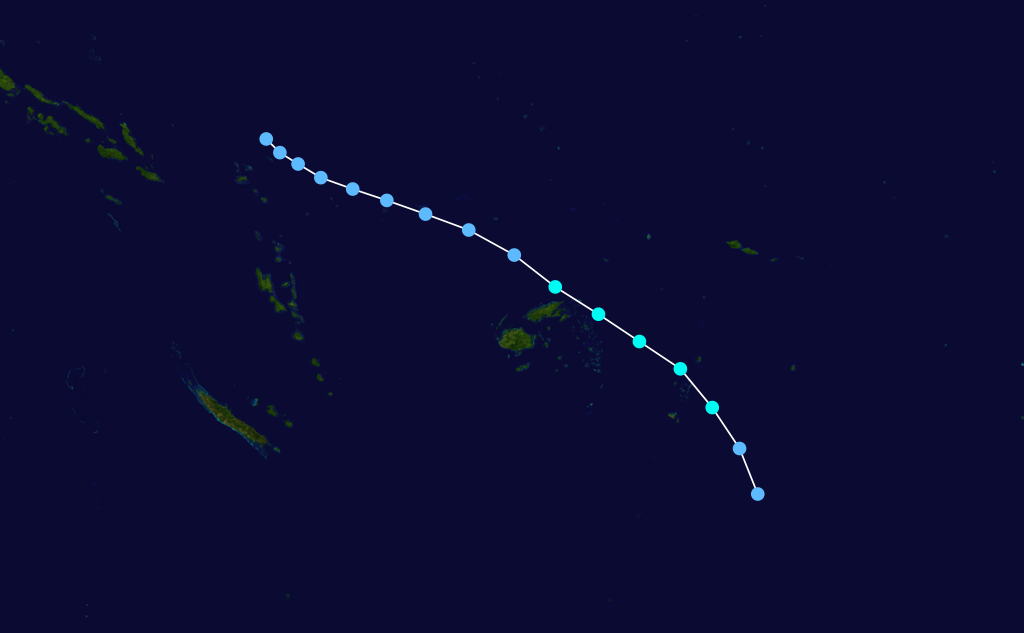
- Duration: December 13 – December 17
- Peak intensity: 65 km/h (40 mph) (1-min); 997 hPa (mbar)

During December 13, a tropical depression developed about 1055 km (655 mi) to the northeast of Suva, Fiji. The system subsequently moved south-eastwards towards Fiji and gradually developed further before the NPMOC designated the system as Tropical Cyclone 04P and initiated advisories on the depression during December 15. At this time, the system was located about 110 km (70 mi) to the northeast of Labasa, Fiji, and was estimated to have maximum 1-minute sustained wind speeds of 65 km/h (40 mph). Over the next couple of days, the system passed through Fiji's Lau Islands and Tonga's Haʻapai Group of islands before being declared extratropical as it moved below 25S and into MetService's area of responsibility. Within Fiji, there were no reports of any casualties, damage, or gale-force winds associated with the system; however, several pressures of between 995–1000 hectopascals (29.38–29.53 inHg) were reported.

=== Tropical Cyclone William ===
- Category 2 tropical cyclone (Australian scale)
- Category 1 tropical cyclone (SSHWS)
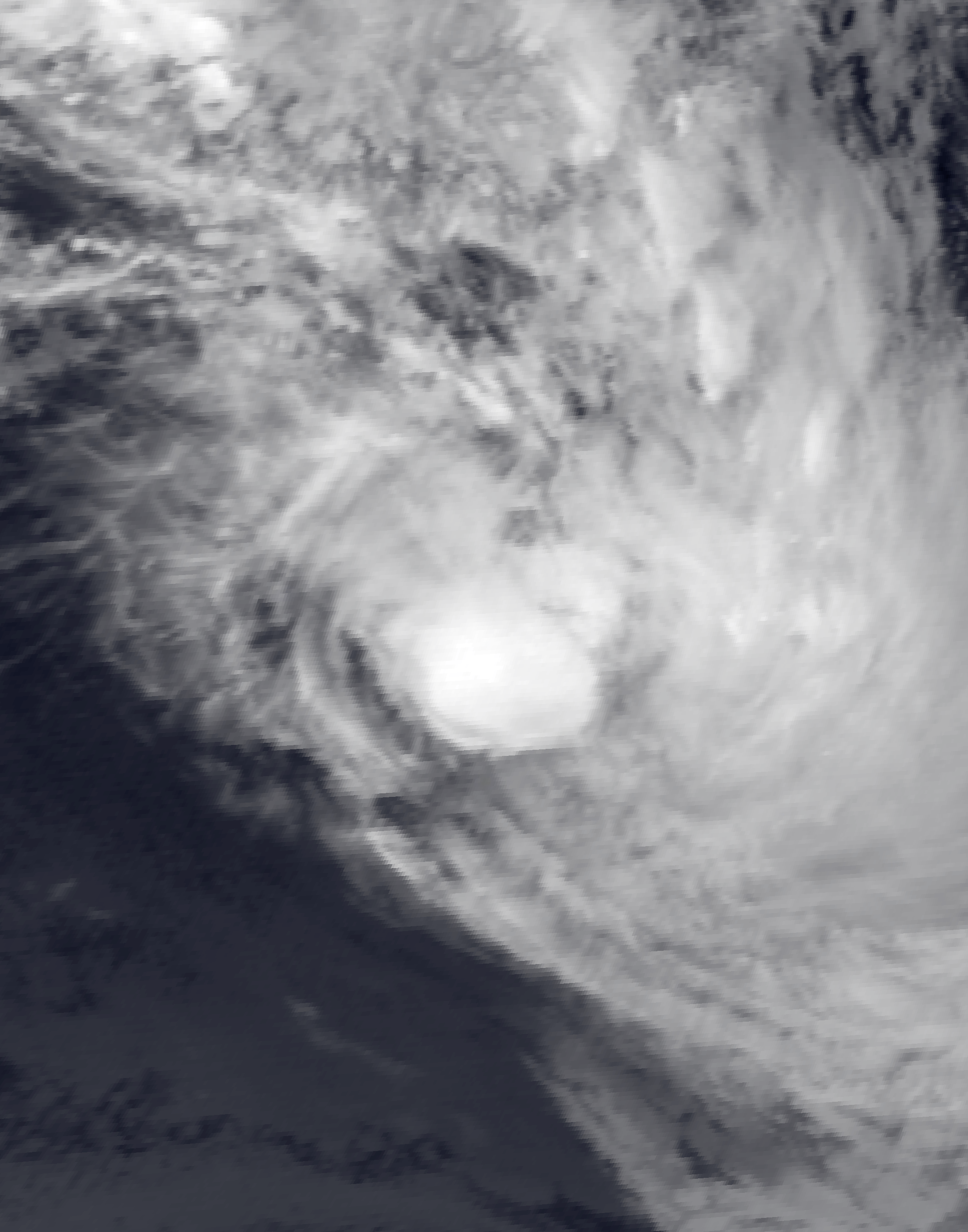
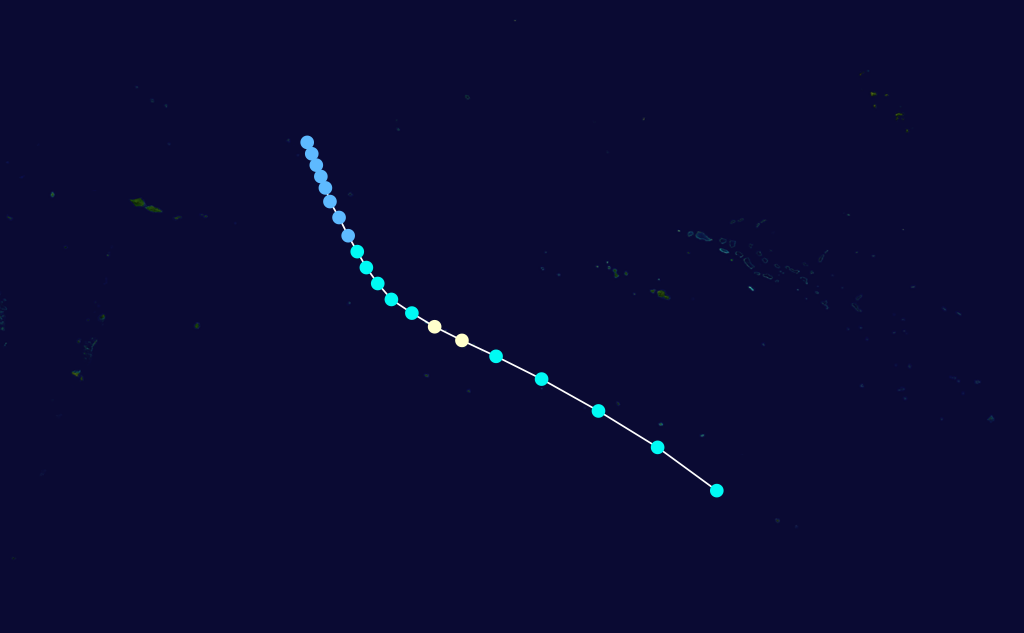
- Duration: December 30 – January 3
- Peak intensity: 110 km/h (70 mph) (10-min); 975 hPa (mbar)

On December 30, the FMS reported that a tropical depression had developed about 860 km (535 mi) to the northeast of Pago Pago in American Samoa. Over the next couple of days, the system moved towards the south-southeast and gradually developed further before the NPMOC designated the depression as Tropical Cyclone 05P. During January 1, TCWC Nadi reported that the depression had developed into a Category 1 tropical cyclone and named it William as it passed near the Cook Island of Autitaki. During the next day, William subsequently slowly accelerated as it passed near to or over several other Cook Islands and intensified into a Category 2 tropical cyclone.

During January 3, the system passed near or over the French Polynesian islands of Maria and Rimatara, where sustained winds of 115 km/h (71 mph) and wind gusts of up to 154 km/h (96 mph) were recorded. Later that day, both the NPMOC and the FMS estimated that the system had peaked just below hurricane-force with winds of 110 km/h (70 mph) as it left the tropics and transitioned into an extratropical cyclone. William's extratropical remnants were tracked by MetService for another couple of days as they moved south-eastwards in the westerlies, before they were last noted near 40.0S 119.5E during January 5, as they moved out of the South Pacific basin. Throughout the Southern Cook Islands, it caused around US$2.5 million worth of damage to crops, buildings, and coconut trees and destroyed a causeway to a tourist resort on Aitutaki. William injured two people and destroyed over 150 houses in French Polynesia, where local leaders accused Météo-France of underestimating William's intensity.

=== Severe Tropical Cyclone Violet ===
- Category 3 severe tropical cyclone (Australian scale)
- Category 1 tropical cyclone (SSHWS)
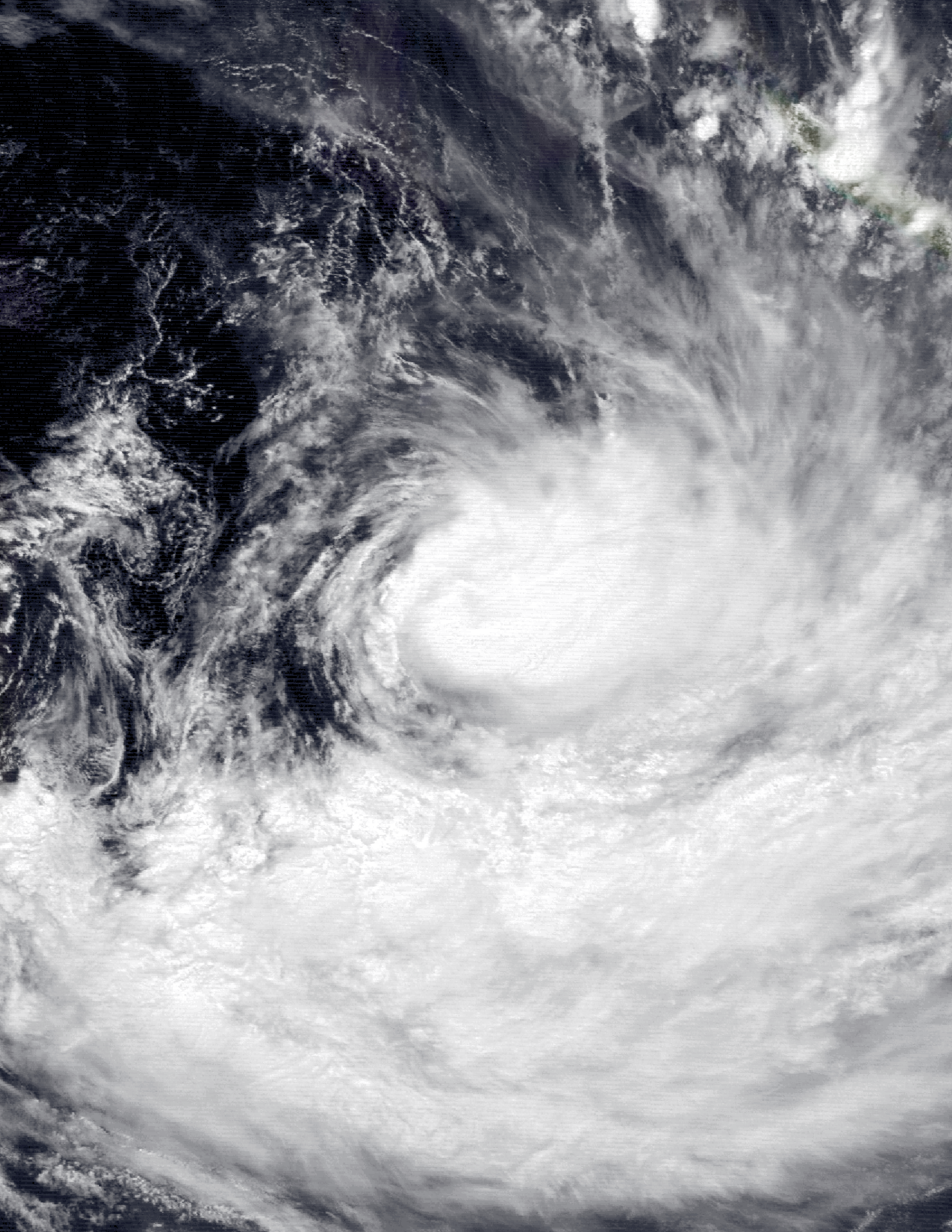
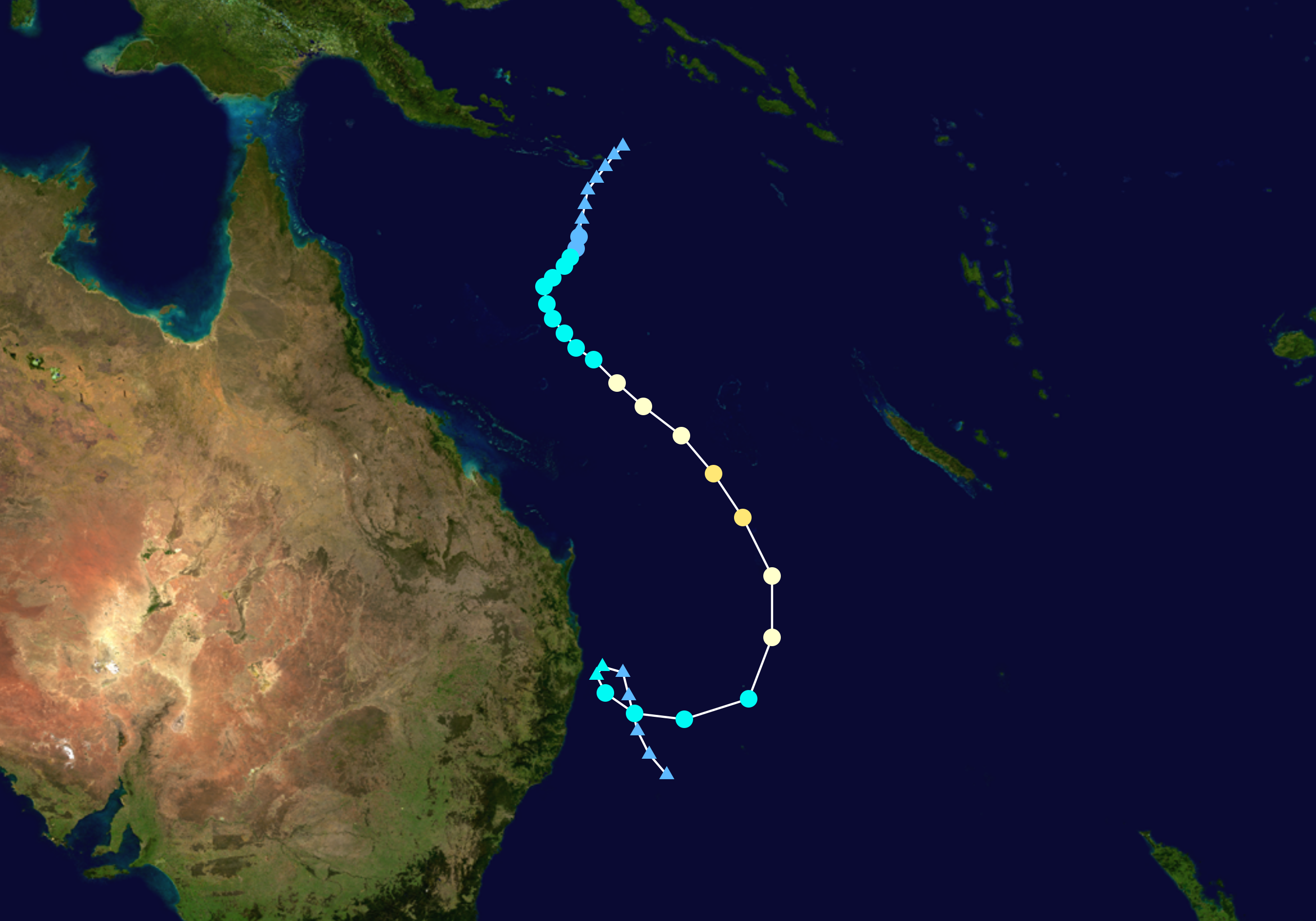
- Duration: March 6 (Entered basin) – March 6 (Exited basin)
- Peak intensity: 130 km/h (80 mph) (10-min); 970 hPa (mbar)

On March 6, Severe Tropical Cyclone Violet moved south-eastwards and into the MetService's area south of 25S as a Category 3 severe tropical cyclone. It then recurved south-westwards and moved out of the basin later on the same day.

=== Tropical Cyclone 18P ===
- Tropical depression (SSHWS)
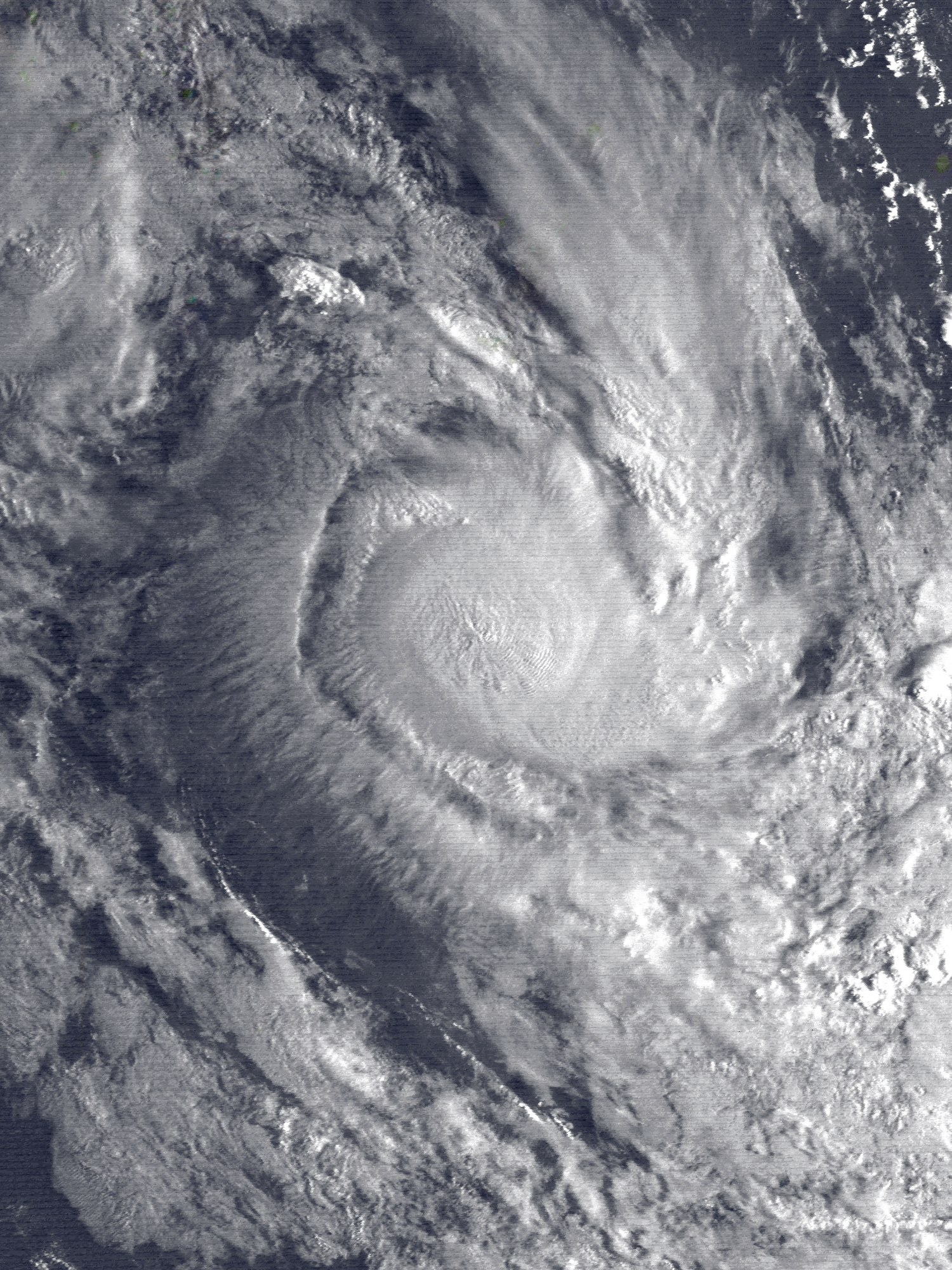
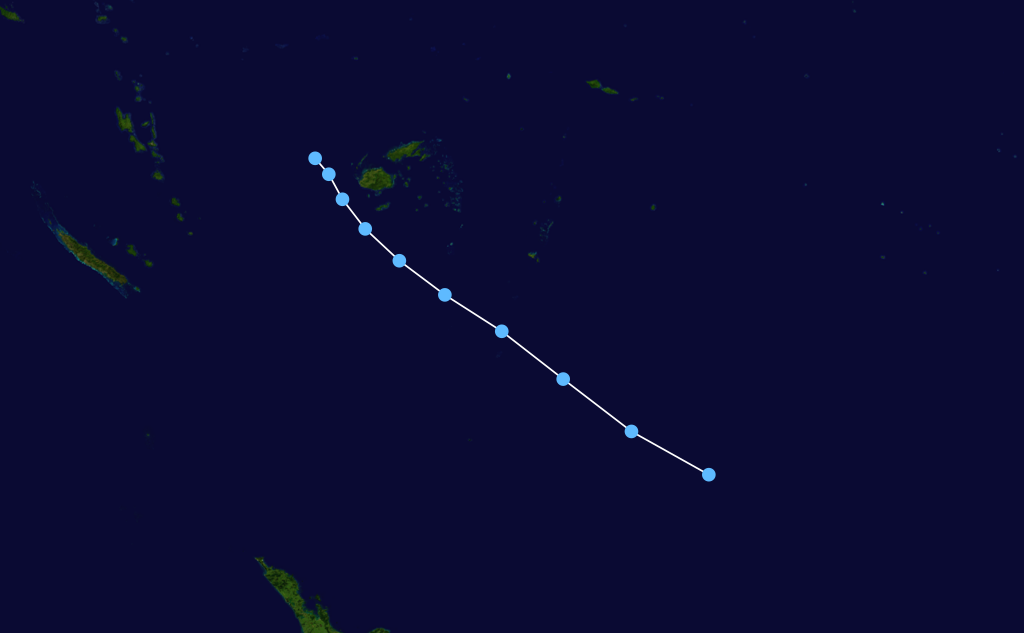
- Duration: March 16 – March 17
- Peak intensity: 55 km/h (35 mph) (1-min); 1000 hPa (mbar)

The system that would become Tropical Cyclone 18P was first noted during March 15, while it was located about 250 km (155 mi) to the northeast of Nadi, Fiji. Over the next couple of days, the system moved south-eastwards away from Fiji, before it was classified as Tropical Cyclone 18P by the NPMOC during March 16, while it was located about 365 km (225 mi) to the south-east of Nuku'alofa in Tonga. At this time, the system was estimated by the NPMOC, to have maximum 1-minute sustained wind speeds of 55 km/h (35 mph). The system subsequently dissipated during the following day, while it was located within MetService's area of responsibility well to the northeast of Wellington, New Zealand. While 18P existed over the South Pacific, a trough of low pressure impacted Fiji, which caused moderate to heavy rain and flooding to be reported in Labasa and Nadi, while over 250 tonnes of canne were destroyed.

== Season effects ==
This table lists all the storms that developed in the South Pacific basin during the 1994–95 season. It includes their intensity on the Australian Tropical Cyclone Intensity Scale, duration, name, areas affected, deaths, and damages. For most storms, the data is taken from TCWC Nadi and Wellington's archives; however data for 04P has been taken from the JTWC archives as opposed to TCWC Nadi and Wellington's, and thus the winds are over 1 minute as opposed to 10 minutes.

1994–95 South Pacific cyclone season
| Name | Dates active | Peak intensity | | | Areas affected | Damage (US$) | Deaths | Refs |
| Name | Dates active | Category | Wind speed | Pressure | Areas affected | Damage (US$) | Deaths | Refs |
|---|---|---|---|---|---|---|---|---|
| Vania | November 12 – 18 | Category 2 tropical cyclone | 100 km/h (65 mph) | 980 hPa (28.94 inHg) | Solomon Islands, Vanuatu, New Caledonia, Fiji | Unknown | Unknown | |
| 04P | December 15 – 21 | Tropical depression | Not Specified | Not Specified | Fiji, Tonga | Unknown | Unknown | |
| William | December 30, 1994 – January 3, 1995 | Category 2 tropical cyclone | 110 km/h (70 mph) | 975 hPa (28.79 inHg) | Cook Islands, French Polynesia | $2.5 million | None | |
| Violet | March 6 | Category 3 severe tropical cyclone | 130 km/h (80 mph) | 970 hPa (28.64 inHg) | Queensland, New South Wales | Unknown | Unknown | |
Season aggregates
| 4 systems | November 12, 1994 – March 6, 1995 | | 130 km/h (80 mph) | 970 hPa (28.64 inHg) | | $2.5 million | | |

== See also ==
- Atlantic hurricane seasons: 1994, 1995
- Pacific hurricane seasons: 1994, 1995
- Pacific typhoon seasons: 1994, 1995
- North Indian Ocean cyclone seasons: 1994, 1995
