= List of Category 2 South Pacific tropical cyclones =

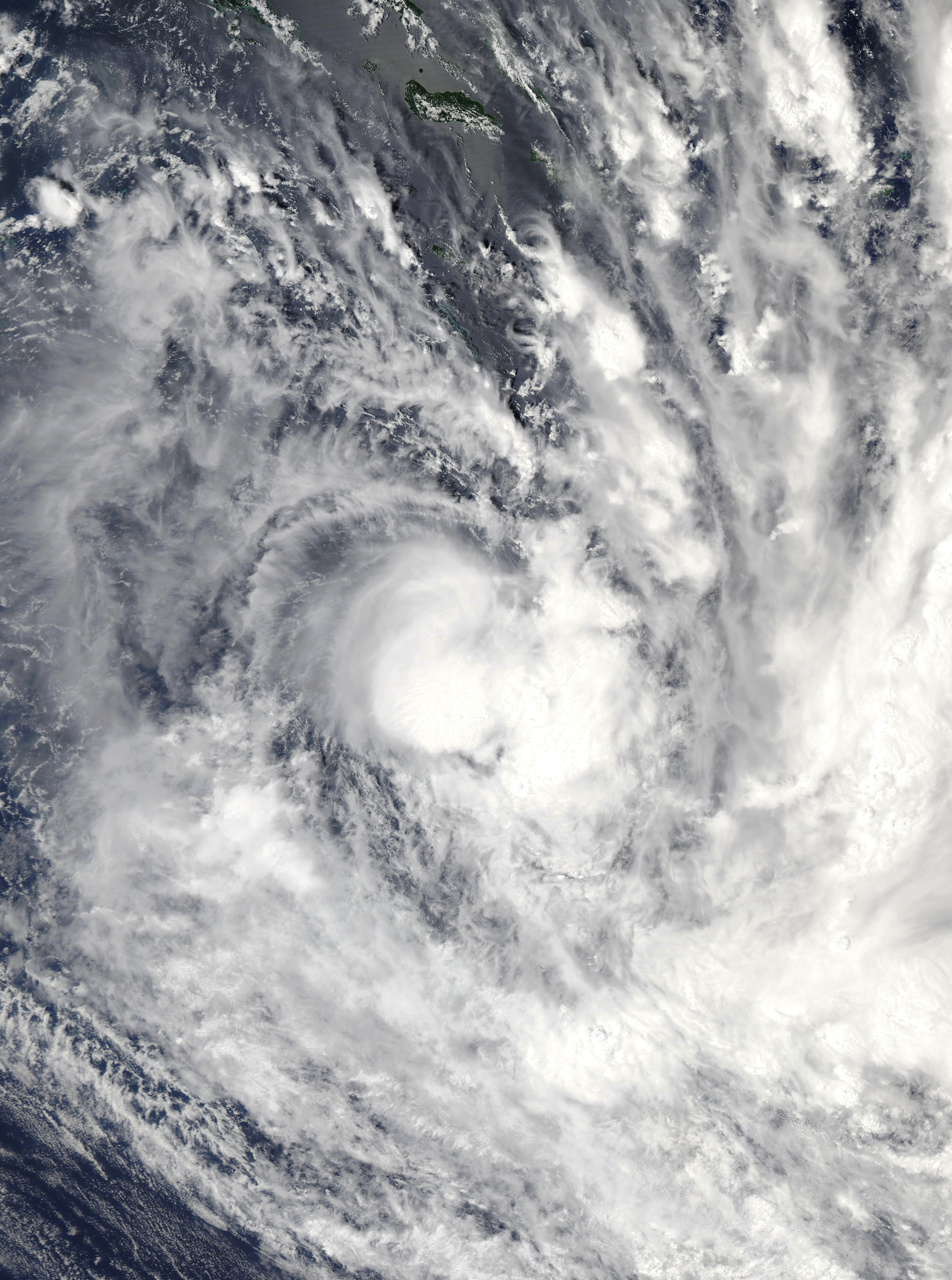
Cyclone Ruby

Category 2 the fourth-highest classification on the Australian tropical cyclone intensity scale is used to classify tropical cyclones, that have 10-minute sustained winds of 48–63 knots (89–117 km/h; 55–72 mph). As of 2020 71 tropical cyclones have peaked as a category 2 tropical cyclone in the South Pacific tropical cyclone basin, which is denoted as the part of the Pacific Ocean to the south of the equator and to the east of 160°E. This list does not include any tropical cyclones that went on to peak as a Category 3, 4 or 5 severe tropical cyclones, while in the Southern Pacific tropical cyclone basin.

== Background ==
The South Pacific tropical cyclone basin is located to the south of the Equator between 160°E and 120°W. The basin is officially monitored by the Fiji Meteorological Service and the New Zealand MetService, while other meteorological services such as the Australian Bureau of Meteorology, Météo-France as well as the United States Joint Typhoon Warning Center also monitor the basin. Within the basin a Category 2 tropical cyclone is a tropical cyclone that has 10-minute mean maximum sustained wind speeds of 48–63 knots (89–117 km/h; 55–72 mph) on the Australian tropical cyclone intensity scale. A named storm could also be classified as a Category 2 tropical cyclone if it is estimated, to have 1-minute mean maximum sustained wind speeds of between 83–95 knots (154–176 km/h; 96–109 mph) on the Saffir–Simpson hurricane wind scale. This scale is only officially used in American Samoa, however, various agencies including NASA also use it to compare tropical cyclones. A Category 2 tropical cyclone is expected to cause catastrophic devastation, if it significantly impacts land at or near its peak intensity.

== Systems ==
=== 1970s ===
Name	Duration	Peak intensity		Areas affected	Damage (USD)	Deaths	Refs
Name	Duration	Wind speed	Pressure	Areas affected	Damage (USD)	Deaths	Refs
Dawn	February 10 – 19, 1970	100 km/h (65 mph)	990 hPa (29.23 inHg)	New Caledonia, Northern Queensland	$5 Million	6	
Rosie	December 30, 1970 – January 4, 1971	100 km/h (65 mph)	980 hPa (28.94 inHg)	Vanuatu, New Caledonia, New Zealand	Minor	None	
Elenore	January 31 – February 7, 1973	100 km/h (65 mph)	980 hPa (28.94 inHg)	Fiji, Tonga			
Juliette	April 2 – 6, 1973	100 km/h (65 mph)	980 hPa (28.94 inHg)	Fiji, Tonga			
Vera	January 20 – 22, 1974	100 km/h (65 mph)	980 hPa (28.94 inHg)	Queensland, New Caledonia			
Zoe	March 14 – March 20, 1974	100 km/h (65 mph)	980 hPa (28.94 inHg)				
Alice	March 23 – 30, 1974	100 km/h (65 mph)	980 hPa (28.94 inHg)				
Tina	April 23 – 28, 1974	100 km/h (65 mph)	980 hPa (28.94 inHg)	Fiji, Tonga	Minor	None	
Flora	January 14 – 17, 1975	100 km/h (65 mph)	980 hPa (28.94 inHg)				
Gloria	January 19 – 20, 1975	100 km/h (65 mph)	980 hPa (28.94 inHg)				
Elsa	January 21 – 26, 1976	100 km/h (65 mph)	980 hPa (28.94 inHg)	New Caledonia, Vanuatu	None	None	
Kim	December 9 – 13, 1976	100 km/h (65 mph)	980 hPa (28.94 inHg)				
Laurie	December 11 – 12, 1976	100 km/h (65 mph)	980 hPa (28.94 inHg)				
Marion	January 12 – 21, 1977	100 km/h (65 mph)	980 hPa (28.94 inHg)	Vanuatu	Unknown	None	
Norman	March 9 – 24, 1977	100 km/h (65 mph)	980 hPa (28.94 inHg)				
Pat	March 17 – 18, 1977	100 km/h (65 mph)	980 hPa (28.94 inHg)				
Steve	November 24 – December 4, 1977	110 km/h (70 mph)	965 hPa (28.50 inHg)				
Anne	December 23 – 31, 1977	100 km/h (65 mph)	980 hPa (28.94 inHg)				
Diana	February 15 – 22, 1978	100 km/h (65 mph)	980 hPa (28.94 inHg)				
Ernie	February 17 – 23, 1978	100 km/h (65 mph)	980 hPa (28.94 inHg)				
Fay	December 27 – 31, 1978	100 km/h (65 mph)	980 hPa (28.94 inHg)	Fiji	Moderate	None	
Henry	January 29 – February 5, 1979	100 km/h (65 mph)	980 hPa (28.94 inHg)				
Kerry	February 13 – 15, 1979	100 km/h (65 mph)	980 hPa (28.94 inHg)				
Leslie	February 21 – 23, 1979	100 km/h (65 mph)	980 hPa (28.94 inHg)				

=== 1980s ===
Name	Duration	Peak intensity		Areas affected	Damage (USD)	Deaths	Refs
Name	Duration	Wind speed	Pressure	Areas affected	Damage (USD)	Deaths	Refs
Ofa		100 km/h (65 mph)	980 hPa (28.94 inHg)				
Tia	March 22 – 27, 1980	100 km/h (65 mph)	980 hPa (28.94 inHg)				
Val	March 25 – 29, 1980	100 km/h (65 mph)	980 hPa (28.94 inHg)				
Daman		100 km/h (65 mph)	980 hPa (28.94 inHg)				
Esau		100 km/h (65 mph)	980 hPa (28.94 inHg)				
Fran		100 km/h (65 mph)	980 hPa (28.94 inHg)				
Unnamed		100 km/h (65 mph)	980 hPa (28.94 inHg)				
Joti	October 31 – November 7, 1982	110 km/h (70 mph)	975 hPa (28.79 inHg)	Vanuatu	Minor	None	
Lisa	December 10 – 18, 1982	110 km/h (70 mph)	975 hPa (28.79 inHg)	Cook Islands	Unknown	None	
Saba		100 km/h (65 mph)	980 hPa (28.94 inHg)				
Harvey	February 7 – 8, 1984	100 km/h (65 mph)	980 hPa (28.94 inHg)	New Caledonia			
Monica		100 km/h (65 mph)	980 hPa (28.94 inHg)				
Gavin	March 2 – 8, 1985	95 km/h (60 mph)	985 hPa (29.09 inHg)	Vanuatu, Fiji			
June		100 km/h (65 mph)	980 hPa (28.94 inHg)				
Osea		100 km/h (65 mph)	980 hPa (28.94 inHg)				
Patsy		100 km/h (65 mph)	980 hPa (28.94 inHg)				
Unnamed		100 km/h (65 mph)	980 hPa (28.94 inHg)				
Zuman		100 km/h (65 mph)	980 hPa (28.94 inHg)				
Dovi		100 km/h (65 mph)	980 hPa (28.94 inHg)				
Eseta	December 15 – 28	95 km/h (60 mph)	985 hPa (29.09 inHg)	Vanuatu, New Caledonia; Fiji, New Zealand			
Delilah	January 1 – 4	110 km/h (70 mph)	975 hPa (28.79 inHg)	New Caledonia, New Zealand			
Fili	January 1 – 8	95 km/h (60 mph)	985 hPa (29.09 inHg)				
Kerry	March 29 – April 4	95 km/h (60 mph)	985 hPa (29.09 inHg)	Fiji			

=== 1990s ===
Name	Duration	Peak intensity		Areas affected	Damage (USD)	Deaths	Refs
Name	Duration	Wind speed	Pressure	Areas affected	Damage (USD)	Deaths	Refs
Nancy	January 31 – February 1	110 km/h (70 mph)	980 hPa (28.94 inHg)	Eastern Australia			
Hilda	March 7 – 9, 1990	95 km/h (60 mph)	985 hPa (29.09 inHg)	Tuvalu, Vanuatu, New Caledonia			
Rae	March 16 – 25, 1990	95 km/h (60 mph)	985 hPa (29.09 inHg)	Tuvalu, Fiji	Minor	3	
Lisa	May 11 – 13, 1991	110 km/h (70 mph)	975 hPa (28.79 inHg)	Solomon Islands, Vanuatu	None	None	
Cliff	February 5 – 9, 1992	100 km/h (65 mph)	980 hPa (28.94 inHg)	French Polynesia			
Gene	March 15 – 19, 1992	95 km/h (60 mph)	985 hPa (29.09 inHg)	Cook Islands			
Innis	April 27 – May 6, 1992	95 km/h (60 mph)	985 hPa (29.09 inHg)	Tokelau, Tuvalu, Solomon Islands, Vanuatu	None	None	
Nisha	February 9 – 16, 1993	110 km/h (70 mph)	975 hPa (28.79 inHg)	Cook Islands	None	None	
Roger	March 20 – 27, 1993	95 km/h (60 mph)	985 hPa (29.09 inHg)	Solomon Islands, Australia, New Caledonia			
Usha	March 22 – April 4	95 km/h (60 mph)	980 hPa (28.94 inHg)				
Vania	November 10 – 18, 1994	100 km/h (65 mph)	980 hPa (28.94 inHg)	Solomon Islands, Vanuatu	Minimal	None	
William	December 30, 1994 – January 3, 1995	110 km/h (70 mph)	975 hPa (28.79 inHg)	Cook Islands, French Polynesia	$2.5 million	None	
Freda	January 26 – February 2, 1997	110 km/h (70 mph)	980 hPa (28.94 inHg)	None	None	None	
Harold	February 19 – 24, 1997	95 km/h (60 mph)	985 hPa (29.09 inHg)	Melanesia, Australia, New Zealand	$27 million	7	
29P	February 24 –26, 1997	110 km/h (70 mph)	975 hPa (28.79 inHg)	None	None	None	
June	May 2 – 11, 1997	95 km/h (60 mph)	985 hPa (29.09 inHg)	Fiji	$60 million		
Lusi	October 8 – 12, 1997	95 km/h (60 mph)	985 hPa (29.09 inHg)	Vanuatu, Fiji	None	None	
Nute	November 18 – 19, 1997	110 km/h (70 mph)	975 hPa (28.79 inHg)	None	None	None	
Pam	December 6 – 10, 1997	110 km/h (70 mph)	975 hPa (28.79 inHg)	Cook Islands	Minor	None	
Ursula	January 29 – February 2, 1998	110 km/h (70 mph)	975 hPa (28.79 inHg)	French Polynesia	Minor	None	
Veli	January 30 – February 3	100 km/h (65 mph)	985 hPa (29.09 inHg)	French Polynesia	Minor	None	
Wes	January 31 – February 5	95 km/h (60 mph)	985 hPa (29.09 inHg)	Cook Islands, French Polynesia	None	10	

=== 2000s ===
Name	Duration	Peak intensity		Areas affected	Damage (USD)	Deaths	Refs
Name	Duration	Wind speed	Pressure	Areas affected	Damage (USD)	Deaths	Refs
Olinda	January 20 – 23	100 km/h (65 mph)	985 hPa (29.09 inHg)	None			
Pete	January 21 – 26	95 km/h (60 mph)	985 hPa (29.09 inHg)	None			
Leo	March 4 – 8	95 km/h (60 mph)	985 hPa (29.09 inHg)	French Polynesia	Minimal	None	
Oma	February 20 – 22	100 km/h (65 mph)	984 hPa (29.06 inHg)	Cook Islands	Minor	None	
Sose	April 5 – 11	110 km/h (70 mph)	975 hPa (28.79 inHg)	Vanuatu, New Caledonia, Australia			
Des	March 5 – 7	95 km/h (60 mph)	985 hPa (29.09 inHg)	New Caledonia	None	0	
Fili	April 27 – 29	95 km/h (60 mph)	987 hPa (29.15 inHg)	Tonga	None	None	
Grace	March 21 – 23	95 km/h (60 mph)	0,985 hPa (29.09 inHg)				
Urmil	January 18 – 25, 2006	110 km/h (70 mph)	975 hPa (28.79 inHg)	French Polynesia			
Zita	January 18 – 25, 2007	100 km/h (65 mph)	975 hPa (28.79 inHg)	French Polynesia			
Arthur	January 21 – 27, 2007	100 km/h (65 mph)	975 hPa (28.79 inHg)	Samoan Islands, French Polynesia			
Becky	March 25 – 29, 2007	110 km/h (70 mph)	975 hPa (28.79 inHg)	Solomon Islands, Vanuatu; New Caledonia			
Cliff	April 1 – 6, 2007	100 km/h (65 mph)	980 hPa (28.94 inHg)	Fiji			
Elisa	January 7 – 11, 2008	95 km/h (60 mph)	980 hPa (28.94 inHg)				
Joni	March 10 – 14, 2009	95 km/h (60 mph)	980 hPa (28.94 inHg)	Cook Islands			
Ken	March 16 – 19, 2009	95 km/h (60 mph)	985 hPa (29.09 inHg)				
Jasper	March 24 – 30, 2009	100 km/h (65 mph)	980 hPa (28.94 inHg)	New Caledonia			
Lin	March 31 – April 7, 2009	110 km/h (70 mph)	975 hPa (28.79 inHg)	Fiji, Tonga			
Mick	December 13 – 14, 2009	110 km/h (70 mph)	975 hPa (28.79 inHg)	Fiji			

=== 2010s ===
Name	Duration	Peak intensity		Areas affected	Damage (USD)	Deaths	Refs
Name	Duration	Wind speed	Pressure	Areas affected	Damage (USD)	Deaths	Refs
Vania	January 13 – 14, 2011	100 km/h (65 mph)	973 hPa (28.73 inHg)	Fiji, Vanuatu, New Caledonia, New Zealand			
Zaka	February 5 – 7, 2011	95 km/h (60 mph)	985 hPa (29.09 inHg)	None	None	None	
Cyril	February 5 – 8, 2012	95 km/h (60 mph)	985 hPa (29.09 inHg)	Fiji, Tonga			
Daphne	March 31 – April 3	100 km/h (65 mph)	985 hPa (29.09 inHg)	Vanuatu, Fiji		5	
Edna	February 5, 2014	95 km/h (60 mph)	985 hPa (29.09 inHg)	New Caledonia, New Zealand			
Kofi	March 3, 2014	100 km/h (65 mph)	980 hPa (28.94 inHg)	Fiji, Tonga			
Niko	January 22 – 23, 2015	100 km/h (65 mph)	982 hPa (29.00 inHg)	French Polynesia			
Solo	April 9 – 12, 2015	100 km/h (65 mph)	985 hPa (29.09 inHg)	Solomon Islands, New Caledonia			
Tatiana	February 12 – 13, 2016	95 km/h (60 mph)	983 hPa (29.03 inHg)	None			
Ella	May 9–14, 2017	110 km/h (70 mph)	980 hPa (28.94 inHg)	Samoan Islands, Tonga, Wallis and Futuna			
Mona	December 31, 2018 – January 7, 2019	95 km/h (60 mph)	985 hPa (29.09 inHg)	Solomon Islands, Fiji			
Sarai	December 27 – December 30, 2019	110 km/h (70 mph)	972 hPa (28.70 inHg)	Tuvalu, Fiji, Tonga, Niue, Southern Cook Islands			

=== 2020s ===
Name	Duration	Peak intensity		Areas affected	Damage (USD)	Deaths	Refs
Name	Duration	Wind speed	Pressure	Areas affected	Damage (USD)	Deaths	Refs
Wasi	February 20 – 23, 2020	110 km/h (70 mph)	975 hPa (28.79 inHg)	Wallis and Futuna, Samoan Islands	Unknown	Unknown	
Gretel	March 14 – 17, 2020	100 km/h (65 mph)	980 hPa (28.94 inHg)	New Caledonia, Norfolk Island, New Zealand	Unknown	Unknown	
Zazu	December 11 – 16, 2020	95 km/h (60 mph)	980 hPa (28.94 inHg)	Samoan Islands, Tonga, Niue	Minimal	Unknown	
Lucas	February 1 – 4, 2020	110 km/h (70 mph)	975 hPa (28.79 inHg)	Vanuatu, New Caledonia	Unknown	2	
09F	February 7 – 11, 2021	95 km/h (60 mph)	990 hPa (29.23 inHg)	Fiji	Unknown	Unknown	
Ruby	December 10 – 15, 2021	110 km/h (70 mph)	980 hPa (28.94 inHg)	New Caledonia	Unknown	Unknown	
Fili	April 7 – 9, 2022	110 km/h (70 mph)	977 hPa (28.85 inHg)	New Caledonia	Unknown	Unknown	
Irene	January 13 - 20, 2023	100 km/h (65 mph)	985 hPa (29.09 inHg)	Vanuatu, New Caledonia	None	None	
Rae	February 22 – 26	Category 2 tropical cyclone	110 km/h (70 mph)	975 hPa (28.79 inHg)	Fiji, Wallis and Futuna, Tonga	Unknown	None
Seru	February 24 – 27	Category 2 tropical cyclone	110 km/h (70 mph)	980 hPa (28.94 inHg)	Fiji, Vanuatu	None	None

== Other systems ==
In addition to the tropical cyclones listed above, the Australian Bureau of Meteorology considers Tropical Cyclone Nancy 1990 to have been a Category 2 tropical cyclone while in the basin.

== See also ==
- List of Category 2 Atlantic hurricanes
- List of Category 2 Pacific hurricanes
