= Typhoons in Japan =

Satellite image of Typhoon Hagibis making landfall in Japan in 2019 one of the country's most destructive typhoons

Japan is one of the countries frequently hit by typhoons, with the nation giving its own names to particularly destructive storms.

Since records began in 1951, an average of 2.6 typhoons reached the main islands of Kyushu, Shikoku, Honshu and Hokkaido per year. Okinawa is, due to its geographic location, most vulnerable to typhoons with an average of 7 storms per year. The most destructive was Typhoon Vera (known in Japan as the Isewan Typhoon), with 5,000 casualties in the Tokai region in September 1959. The costliest to affect Japan (and the second costliest in the Western Pacific basin when not adjusted for inflation) was Typhoon Hagibis (also known as the Reiwa 1 East Japan Typhoon), which caused $17.3 billion (2019 USD) in damages throughout the country. Until the 1960s, the death toll was often hundreds of people per typhoon. Since then, improvements in construction, flood prevention, high tide detection and early warnings have substantially reduced the death toll, which now rarely exceeds a dozen people per typhoon. Japan also has special search and rescue units to save people in distress.

== 20th century ==
=== Pre-1950s ===
- September 1902 ― 1,300 people were killed by a typhoon in Japan.
- September 22, 1912 ― A typhoon killed 1,000 people, left US$20 million in damage, and sank the SS Kiche Maru.
- September 1917 ― The island of Honshu was struck by a typhoon, leading to 4,000 deaths and US$50 million in damages.
- September 1923 ― A typhoon struck the island of Honshu, killing 3,000 and causing US$10 million in damages.
- September 13, 1927 ― A damaging typhoon struck Kyushu.
- August 1931 ― A typhoon impacted the southern Ryukyu islands, where it would kill 15 people and wreck 10,000 houses. The island of Ishigaki would record a minimum pressure of 986 mbar (29.1 inHg).
- August 24, 1931 ― A typhoon struck Okinawa with a minimum pressure of 963 mbar (28.4 inHg).
- September 1931 ― A typhoon struck the island of Kyushu.
- September 1931 ― A typhoon moved across Western Japan and Sakhalin, causing 100-1,000 deaths and destroying 1,346 houses in the Tokyo area.
- October 13, 1931 ― A typhoon moved across Central Japan, bringing high winds and loss of life.
- September 21, 1934 ― The Muroto Typhoon caused extraordinary damage in Japan, in which it killed 3,066 people and caused over US$300 million in damages. The storm is the strongest to strike mainland Japan by barometric pressure.
- September 27, 1935 ― A typhoon would make landfall in Japan, causing several hundred casualties and destroying 75,000 houses.
- July 1936 ― A typhoon crossed the Ryukyu islands and then made landfall in Hokkaido, killing 7 people.
- July 25, 1937 ― Kyushu was struck by a typhoon.
- August 3, 1937 ― The Ryukyu Islands were struck by a typhoon, with a minimum pressure of 979 mbar (28.9 inHg) recorded on Ishigaki.
- September 10, 1937 ― A typhoon struck Shikoku, killing at least 70 people as it moved across Japan.
- September 11, 1940 ― A typhoon hit Kyushu and Honshu, killing at least 50 people.
- September 17, 1945 ― Typhoon Ida, known in Japan as the Makurazaki Typhoon, killed 2,473 people in Japan only a month after its surrender in World War II.
- October 10, 1945 ― Typhoon Louise, known in Japan as the Akune Typhoon, killed 377 people and causes US$100,000 in damages across the country.
- September 15, 1946 ― Typhoon Kathleen struck the Boso Peninsula, killing 1,077 people.
- September 16, 1948 ― Typhoon Ione made landfall in Honshu, leaving 512 people dead.

=== 1950s ===
- September 3, 1950 ― Typhoon Jane killed 398 people and caused catastrophic damage after making landfall in Shikoku.
- September 13, 1950 ― Typhoon Kezia left 30 dead and destroyed 4,836 houses in Kyushu.
- July 1, 1951 ― Typhoon Kate killed 13 people in Kyushu.
- October 14, 1951 ― Typhoon Ruth killed 572 across Japan.
- June 7, 1953 ― Typhoon Judy killed 37 people in Kyushu.
- September 25, 1953 ― Typhoon Tess caused major damage, killing 393 people in Honshu.
- August 17, 1954 ― Typhoon Grace killed 43 people.
- September 13, 1954 ― Typhoon June hit Kyushu, killing 107.
- September 18, 1954 ― Typhoon Lorna killed 34 in Honshu.
- September 26, 1954 ― Typhoon Marie (known in Japan as the Toya Maru Typhoon) struck Japan, causing the sinking of the Toya Maru. 1,361 would be killed.
- September 29, 1955 ― Typhoon Louise would cause 54 deaths in Kyushu.
- September 8, 1956 ― Typhoon Emma killed 77 and caused US$8-12 million in damages in Okinawa.
- September 27, 1956 ― Typhoon Harriet struck Honshu, killing 53 and leaving US$50 million in damages.
- September 6, 1957 ― Typhoon Bess killed 20 people.
- July 22, 1958 ― Typhoon Alice hit Japan, killing 26.
- September 26, 1958 ― Typhoon Ida, known in Japan as the Kanogawa Typhoon, would cause catastrophic damage, killing 1,269 and causing US$50 million in damages.
- August 13, 1959 ― Typhoon Georgia hit Honshu, killing 188 and causing US$50 million in damages.
- September 14, 1959 ― Typhoon Sarah, known in Japan as the Miyakojima Typhoon, killed 7 and caused US$2 million in damages on Miyakojima.
- September 26, 1959 ― Typhoon Vera, known in Japan as the Isewan Typhoon, would be the worst typhoon to affect the nation on record, killing 5,098 and causing US$261 million in damages after making landfall as a Category 5 Super Typhoon and is the strongest typhoon to strike Japan in history.
- October 16, 1959 ― Typhoon Charlotte traversed Okinawa, killing 46 and leaving US$300,000 in damages.

=== 1960s ===
- August 12, 1960 ― Typhoon Wendy impacted Japan, leaving 28 dead.
- September 16, 1961 ― Typhoon Nancy, known in Japan as the 2nd Muroto Typhoon, caused severe damage, leaving 202 dead and US$500 million in damages.
- August 9, 1963 ― Typhoon Bess struck Kyushu, killing 23.
- August 23, 1964 ― Typhoon Kathy would affect Okinawa and Kyushu, leaving 75 dead.
- September 24, 1964 ― Typhoon Wilda hit Kyushu as a major typhoon, killing 43.
- August 5, 1965 ― Typhoon Jean struck Kyushu as a major typhoon, killing 28.
- September 10, 1965 ― Typhoon Shirley made landfall in Shikoku as a major typhoon, killing 67 people.
- September 17, 1965 ― Typhoon Trix would strike Japan a week after Shirley, killing 98 people.
- June 28, 1966 ― Although offshore, Typhoon Kit would kill 64 in eastern Japan.
- September 24, 1966 ― Typhoon Ida would make landfall as a major typhoon in Honshu, killing 275-318 people.
- August 18, 1968 ― Although offshore, Tropical Storm Polly would cause torrential rainfall, with 112 people killed.
- August 24, 1968 ― Typhoon Della, known in Japan as the 3rd Miyakojima Typhoon, would strike the Ryukyu islands, leaving 11 people dead.

=== 1970s ===
- August 21, 1970 ― Typhoon Anita struck Shikoku as a major typhoon; 23 would be killed.
- August 5, 1971 ― Typhoon Olive would kill 69 people as it made landfall in Shikoku.
- August 29, 1971 ― Typhoon Trix would cause 44 deaths and US$50.6 million in damages as it affected Japan.
- September 7, 1971 ― Typhoon Virginia would skirt by the coast of Honshu as a tropical storm, leading to 56 deaths.
- July 20, 1972 ― Typhoon Rita would loop around the Ryukyu Islands, killing 3 people.
- September 16, 1972 ― Typhoon Helen would kill 87 and cause US$102 million in damages as it struck Honshu as a major typhoon.
- July 6, 1974 ― Typhoon Gilda, despite affecting Japan as a weak system, would kill 138 people.
- August 17, 1975 ― Typhoon Phyllis struck Shikoku, killing 88 and causing US$37 million in damage.
- August 21, 1975 ― Typhoon Rita left 33 dead and caused US$114 million in damages as it swept through Japan.
- September 9, 1976 ― Typhoon Fran would dump tremendous rainfall, killing 169 and causing US$660 million in damages.
- September 8, 1977 ― Typhoon Babe, known in Japan as the Okinoerabu Typhoon, would kill 23 people and leave US$23 million in damages in the Ryukyu Islands.
- October 19, 1979 ― Typhoon Tip, after reaching its remarkable peak intensity, would strike Japan as a minimal typhoon, killing 42 people and causing US$482.34 million in damages throughout the country.

=== 1980s ===
- September 11, 1980 ― Typhoon Orchid killed 53 in Kyushu as a moderate typhoon.
- August 23, 1981 ― Typhoon Thad killed 43 and left US$1.03 billion in damages across Japan.
- August 1, 1982 ― Typhoon Bess, a destructive storm, would kill 95 and cause US$2.38 billion in damage.
- September 25, 1982 ― Typhoon Ken killed 5 as it made landfall on Shikoku.
- August 17, 1983 ― A weakening Typhoon Abby struck Honshu, leaving 7 people dead and causing minimal damage.
- September 28, 1983 ― Typhoon Forrest hit Kyushu as a minimal typhoon, killing 21 people.
- June 30, 1985 ― Typhoon Irma struck Honshu, killing 19 people and inflicting US$545 million in damage.
- August 31, 1985 ― Typhoon Pat left 23 dead in Kyushu.
- August 3, 1986 ― The remnants of Tropical Storm Sarah killed 14 people.
- October 16, 1987 ― Typhoon Kelly would strike Japan, killing 9 and inflicting US$366 million in damages.
- July 27, 1989 ― Typhoon Judy hit Kyushu, leading to the deaths of 11 people and causing US$28.9 million in damages.
- September 19, 1989 ― Typhoon Wayne killed eight.

=== 1990s ===
- August 10, 1990 ― Typhoon Winona struck Honshu at peak intensity, killing one and inflicting US$60.3 million in damages.
- August 21, 1990 ― Typhoon Zola killed six and caused damages of US$104 million.
- September 19, 1990 ― Typhoon Flo struck Honshu, causing 40 deaths and US$918 million in damages.
- September 29, 1990 ― Typhoon Gene hit Japan as a minimal typhoon, killing 6 people and inflicting US$158 million in losses.
- October 7, 1990 ― Typhoon Hattie affected Japan after weakening to a tropical storm, killing 3 people and causing US$9.9 million in damage.
- November 30, 1990 ― The sixth and final storm to affect Japan in 1990, Typhoon Page resulted in 4 deaths and US$33 million in losses in Japan.
- July 27, 1991 ― Typhoon Caitlin, although bringing drought relief, killed six people and caused US$75 million in damages throughout Japan.
- August 22, 1991 ― Tropical Storm Gladys resulted in 23 fatalities and US$88.4 million in damages across Southern Japan.
- September 13, 1991 ― Typhoon Kinna killed 11 people and caused US$383 million in damage across Japan after hitting Kyushu at peak intensity.
- September 19, 1991 ― Tropical Storm Luke stayed offshore Japan but killed 12 people and caused US$179 million in damage.
- September 27, 1991 ― Typhoon Mireille made landfall near Hiroshima, becoming the costliest typhoon on record at the time. Mireille would kill 68 people and cause US$10 billion in damages throughout the country.
- July 1, 1992 ― Typhoon Bobbie impacted Japan, leading to US$27.2 million in damages.
- August 4, 1992 ― Tropical Storm Irving hit Shikoku and Kyushu, killing two people and causing US$4.74 million in losses.
- August 7, 1992 ― Typhoon Janis struck Kyushu, killing 12 people and inflicting US$584 million in damage.
- August 18, 1992 ― Typhoon Kent made landfall in Kyushu as a tropical storm, killing 8 people and causing US$15 million in losses.
- July 24, 1993 ― Tropical Storm Nathan left 47 people dead.
- July 27, 1993 ― Tropical Storm Ofelia moved over Japan, killing 13 and causing $197 million in damage.
- July 29, 1993 ― Tropical Storm Percy struck Kyushu at peak intensity, inflicting US$35.4 million in damages.
- August 9, 1993 ― Typhoon Robyn brushed the coast of Kyushu, resulting in the deaths of 9 people and damaged totaling US$92.3 million.
- September 3, 1993 ― Typhoon Yancy would make landfall in Kyushu as a major typhoon, killing 48 people and inflicting US$1.67 billion in losses.
- September 29, 1994 ― Typhoon Orchid caused 9 deaths in Honshu.
- September 17, 1995 ― Typhoon Oscar skirted past Honshu as a super typhoon, resulting in 8 fatalities and US$6.7 million in losses.
- September 23, 1995 ― Typhoon Ryan struck Kyushu as a borderline major typhoon, causing 5 deaths.
- July 18, 1996 ― Typhoon Eve would make a powerful landfall in Kyushu, although it would cause no fatalities.
- July 26, 1997 ― Typhoon Rosie made landfall in Shikoku, causing 5 deaths.
- September 15, 1997 ― Typhoon Oliwa struck Kyushu, killing 11 people and causing US$50.1 million in damages.
- September 22, 1998 ― Typhoon Vicki made landfall on the Kii Peninsula, resulting in 18 deaths.
- October 17, 1998 ― Typhoon Zeb would move through Japan, killing 14 people throughout the country and causing US$335.5 million in losses.
- September 23, 1999 ― Typhoon Bart struck Kyushu as a powerful typhoon, killing 30 people and resulting in US$5.75 billion in damages.

== 21st century ==
=== 2000s ===
- July 8, 2000 ― Typhoon Kirogi brushed the coast of Honshu, resulting in 3 deaths and US$140 million in damages.
- August 21, 2001 ― Typhoon Pabuk struck Honshu as a tropical storm, causing 8 deaths and US$52 million in losses.
- September 11, 2001 ― Typhoon Danas made landfall in Honshu, killing 8 people and causing US$91 million in damages.
- July 10, 2002 ― Typhoon Chataan hit Honshu as a tropical storm, killing 6 people and inflicting US$500 million in damages.
- July 15, 2002 ― Typhoon Halong impacted Honshu as a tropical storm, resulting in 1 death and US$89.8 million in losses.
- October 1, 2002 ― Typhoon Higos killed 12 people and caused US$2.14 billion in damages as it struck Tokyo.
- August 8, 2003 ― Typhoon Etau caused 20 fatalities and US$295 million in damages as it hit Shikoku.
- June 21, 2004 ― Typhoon Dianmu moved through Japan as a tropical storm, resulting in 6 deaths and US$68.5 million in damages.
- August 29, 2004 ― Typhoon Chaba killed 18 people and resulted in US$2 billion in damages as it moved through Japan.
- September 7, 2004 ― Typhoon Songda made landfall near Nagasaki, killing 47 people and causing US$1.15 billion in damages.
- September 29, 2004 ― Typhoon Meari killed 27 and inflicted US$798 million in damage after moving through Japan.
- October 9, 2004 ― Typhoon Ma-on made landfall in Honshu as a major typhoon, resulting in 7 fatalities and damages of US$623 million.
- October 20, 2004 ― Typhoon Tokage moved through Japan, leading to 95 fatalities and US$2.3 billion in damages.
- September 6, 2005 ― Typhoon Nabi killed 29 people and caused US$854 million in damages across Japan.
- August 17, 2006 ― Tropical Storm Wukong caused 2 fatalities in Kyushu.
- September 15, 2006 ― Typhoon Shanshan passed over Iriomote and later Kyushu, resulting in 11 deaths and US$2.5 billion in damages.
- July 13, 2007 ― Typhoon Man-yi would affect Okinawa and Kyushu, in which it would kill 6 people.
- September 6, 2007 ― Typhoon Fitow killed 3 people and inflicted US$1 billion in damages after striking Honshu.
- October 27, 2007 ―Tropical Storm Faxai stayed offshore, but caused 1 death and US$1.5 million in damages.
- August 11, 2009 ― Although offshore, Tropical Storm Etau would kill 28 people and inflict US$87.5 million in losses.
- October 7, 2009 ― Typhoon Melor struck Honshu, killing 3 people and causing US$1.5 billion in damages.

=== 2010s ===
- July 19, 2011 ― Typhoon Ma-on impacted Japan, leading to 5 deaths and US$50 million in damages.
- September 2, 2011 ― Tropical Storm Talas moved through Japan, killing 59 people and causing US$600 million in damages.
- September 21, 2011 ― Typhoon Roke struck Honshu, causing 13 fatalities and US$1.7 billion in losses.
- June 19, 2012 ― Typhoon Guchol made landfall in Honshu as a tropical storm, killing 1 person and causing US$100 million in damages.
- September 30, 2012 ― Typhoon Jelawat hit Honshu as a tropical storm, killing 2 people and inflicting US$115 million in losses.
- September 15, 2013 ― Typhoon Man-yi killed 6 people and caused damages of US$1.62 billion after making landfall in Honshu as a tropical storm.
- October 15, 2013 ― Typhoon Wipha, despite staying offshore, would cause 41 fatalities and US$404.8 million in damages throughout Japan.
- July 9, 2014 ― Typhoon Neoguri moved through Japan as a tropical storm, killing 3 people and causing damages totaling US$632 million.
- August 1, 2014 ― Tropical Storm Nakri killed 6 people and caused US$117,000 damages as it affected the Ryukyu Islands.
- August 9, 2014 ― Typhoon Halong would kill 10 people and result in US$36.5 million worth of damage in Japan.
- October 5, 2014 ― Typhoon Phanfone struck Honshu as a minimal typhoon, resulting in 11 fatalities and US$100 million in damages.
- October 12, 2014 ― Typhoon Vongfong affected Japan as a tropical storm, killing 3 people and causing US$118 million in damages.
- July 16, 2015 ― Typhoon Nangka moved across central Japan, killing 2 people and inflicting US$209 million in total damage.
- August 24, 2015 ― Typhoon Goni struck Kyushu as a major typhoon, leading to 1 death and US$801.3 million in losses.
- September 9, 2015 ― Tropical Storm Etau made landfall in Honshu, killing 8 people and causing US$2.44 billion in damages.
- August 22, 2016 ― Typhoon Mindulle killed 3 people and caused US$448 million in damages after hitting Honshu.
- August 30, 2016 ― Typhoon Lionrock caused significant flooding, leading to 22 deaths and US$2.74 billion in damages.
- September 19, 2016 ― Typhoon Malakas struck Kyushu, causing US$300 million in damages.
- August 7, 2017 ― Typhoon Noru moved through Japan, killing 2 people and inflicting >US$100 million in total damage.
- September 17, 2017 ― Typhoon Talim impacted Japan as a tropical storm, leading to 5 deaths and US$750 million worth of damage.
- October 23, 2017 ― Typhoon Lan struck Honshu, with 17 deaths and US$2 billion in damages being attributed to the storm.
- July 2, 2018 ― Typhoon Prapiroon affected Japan, resulting in 3 deaths and US$10.1 million in damages.
- July 28, 2018 ― Typhoon Jongdari hit Honshu, inflicting US$1.4 billion in losses.
- August 23, 2018 ― Typhoon Cimaron moved through central Japan, leading to 3 fatalities and US$30.6 million in damages.
- September 4, 2018 ― Typhoon Jebi struck central Japan as a major typhoon in which it would kill 14 people and cause US$13 billion in total damage.
- September 30, 2018 ― Typhoon Trami caused 4 deaths and US$2.69 billion in losses as it impacted central Japan.
- August 7, 2019 ― Typhoon Francisco hit Kyushu, killing at least 1 person.
- August 13, 2019 ― Typhoon Krosa moved through Western Japan as a tropical storm, killing 3 people and causing US$20.5 million in damages.
- September 8, 2019 ― Typhoon Faxai, known in Japan as the Reiwa 1 Bōsō Peninsula Typhoon, struck the Kanto region, resulting in 3 deaths and US$10 billion in damages.
- September 22, 2019 ― Staying offshore, Typhoon Tapah killed 3 people and caused US$5.42 million in losses.
- October 12, 2019 ― Typhoon Hagibis, known in Japan as the Reiwa 1 East Japan Typhoon, would devastate the Tokyo region, becoming the costliest storm to affect Japan on record, as well as the costliest Pacific typhoon at the time. The storm would kill 118 people directly and 29 indirectly in total with 3 missing. With a total damage of ¥1.88 trillion (US$17.3 billion), Hagibis became the costliest typhoons in the country in nominal terms.

=== 2020s ===
- September 6, 2020 ― Typhoon Haishen skirted the coast of Kyushu, resulting in 2 fatalities and damages of US$140 million across Japan.
- September 18, 2022 ― Typhoon Nanmadol struck Kyushu, killing 5 people and causing damages of US$2 billion.
- September 22, 2022 ― Tropical Storm Talas killed 3 people offshore Honshu.
- August 14, 2023 ― Typhoon Lan made landfall in Central Japan, causing 1 death and total damages of US$500 million.
- September 8, 2023 ― The remnants of Tropical Storm Yun-yeung killed 3 people and caused at least US$10 million in damages.
- August 29, 2024 ― Typhoon Shanshan hit Kyushu, resulting in 8 fatalities and damages of at least US$6 billion.
- August 11, 2026 – Tropical Storm Chan-hom made landfall in Ibaraki Prefecture as a tropical storm.

== Special names of typhoons by JMA ==
The Japan Meteorological Agency assigns special names to typhoons that have caused significant damage in Japan.

Significant typhoons with special names (from the Japan Meteorological Agency)
Name	Number	Japanese name
Ida	T4518	Makurazaki Typhoon (枕崎台風)
Louise	T4523	Akune Typhoon (阿久根台風)
Marie	T5415	Tōya Maru Typhoon (洞爺丸台風)
Ida	T5822	Kanogawa Typhoon (狩野川台風)
Sarah	T5914	Miyakojima Typhoon (宮古島台風)
Vera	T5915	Isewan Typhoon (伊勢湾台風)
Nancy	T6118	2nd Muroto Typhoon (第2室戸台風)
Cora	T6618	2nd Miyakojima Typhoon (第2宮古島台風)
Della	T6816	3rd Miyakojima Typhoon (第3宮古島台風)
Babe	T7709	Okinoerabu Typhoon (沖永良部台風)
Faxai	T1915	Reiwa 1 Bōsō Peninsula Typhoon (令和元年房総半島台風)
Hagibis	T1919	Reiwa 1 East Japan Typhoon (令和元年東日本台風)
