= List of storms named Kent =

The name Kent has been used for two tropical cyclones in the northwest Pacific Ocean.

- Typhoon Kent (1992) (T9211, 11W) – struck Japan.
- Typhoon Kent (1995) (T9508, 12W, Gening) – made landfall on China, near Hong Kong.
