= List of storms named Doksuri =

The name Doksuri (Korean: 독수리, [to̞ks͈uɾi]) has been used for three tropical cyclones in the northwestern Pacific Ocean. The name was contributed by South Korea and means eagle or the Eurasian black vulture (Aegypius monachus) in Korean. It replaced the name Nabi (Korean: 나비, [na̠bi]), which means butterfly in Korean, after it was retired following the 2005 Pacific typhoon season.

- Tropical Storm Doksuri (2012) (T1206, 07W, Dindo) – made landfall over Nanshui, Zhuhai, Guangdong, China
- Typhoon Doksuri (2017) (T1719, 21W, Maring) – traversed the Northern Philippines and made landfall in Central Vietnam
- Typhoon Doksuri (2023) (T2305, 05W, Egay) – a super typhoon that ravaged across Northern Philippines, Taiwan and Southern China, becoming the costliest typhoon to hit China and the Western Pacific.

The name Doksuri was retired following the 2023 Pacific typhoon season and was replaced with Bori (Korean: 보리, [po̞ɾi]), meaning barley in Korean.
