= Typhoon Kent (1992) =

Pacific typhoon in 1992

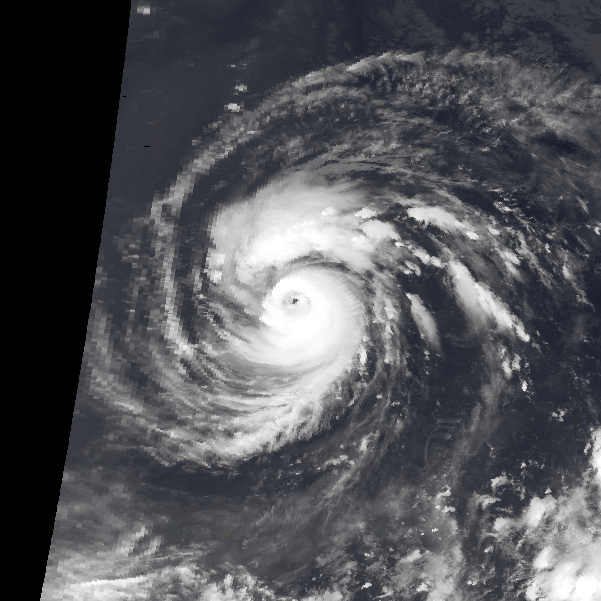
- Typhoon Kent at peak intensity on August 11

Meteorological history
- Formed: August 6, 1992
- Dissipated: August 19, 1992

Very strong typhoon
- 10-minute sustained (JMA)
- Highest winds: 175 km/h (110 mph)
- Lowest pressure: 930 hPa (mbar); 27.46 inHg

Category 4-equivalent super typhoon
- 1-minute sustained (SSHWS/JTWC)
- Highest winds: 240 km/h (150 mph)
- Lowest pressure: 910 hPa (mbar); 26.87 inHg

Overall effects
- Fatalities: 8 total
- Injuries: 2
- Damage: $15 million (1992 USD)
- Areas affected: Japan
- IBTrACS
- Part of the 1992 Pacific typhoon season

Typhoon Kent was a strong mid-season typhoon that struck southern Japan during August 1992. An area of convection developed east of the International Date Line. Tracking west-northwestward, a tropical depression developed on August 5, and the next day, intensified into a tropical storm. On August 8, increased vertical wind shear caused convection to decrease, although Kent strengthened into a typhoon on the next day. An eye then appeared as conditions aloft became more conducive, and on August 11, Kent attained its peak intensity. Under the influence of a subtropical ridge located to its north, the typhoon initially continued to move west-northwestward before turning towards Kyushu. The storm steadily weakened prior to making landfall on August 18 just below typhoon intensity. The mountainous terrain of Japan accelerated the weakening trend, and on August 20, Kent dissipated.

The cyclone was the third to hit Japan during August 1992, the second highest number of storms to hit Japan in a month. The typhoon dropped heavy rainfall across western portions of the Japanese archipelago, peaking at 1,286 mm (50.6 in) in Hidegadake. Nationwide, eight fatalities were reported and two others sustained injuries. Rough seas in Tokushima Prefecture swept away five of six family members, with the sixth severely wounded. Another individual drowned in Kyoto Prefecture and a swimmer was injured offshore Tottori Prefecture. A total of 1,561 houses were destroyed while 379 others were flooded. Furthermore, two vessels were damaged. Many ferries linking Honshu and Kyushu were cancelled. Monetary damage totaled ¥1.9 billion (US$15 million). (Note: All currencies are converted from Japanese yen to United States Dollars using this with an exchange rate of the year 1992.) (Note: All damage totals are in 1992 values of their respective currencies.)

== Meteorological history ==
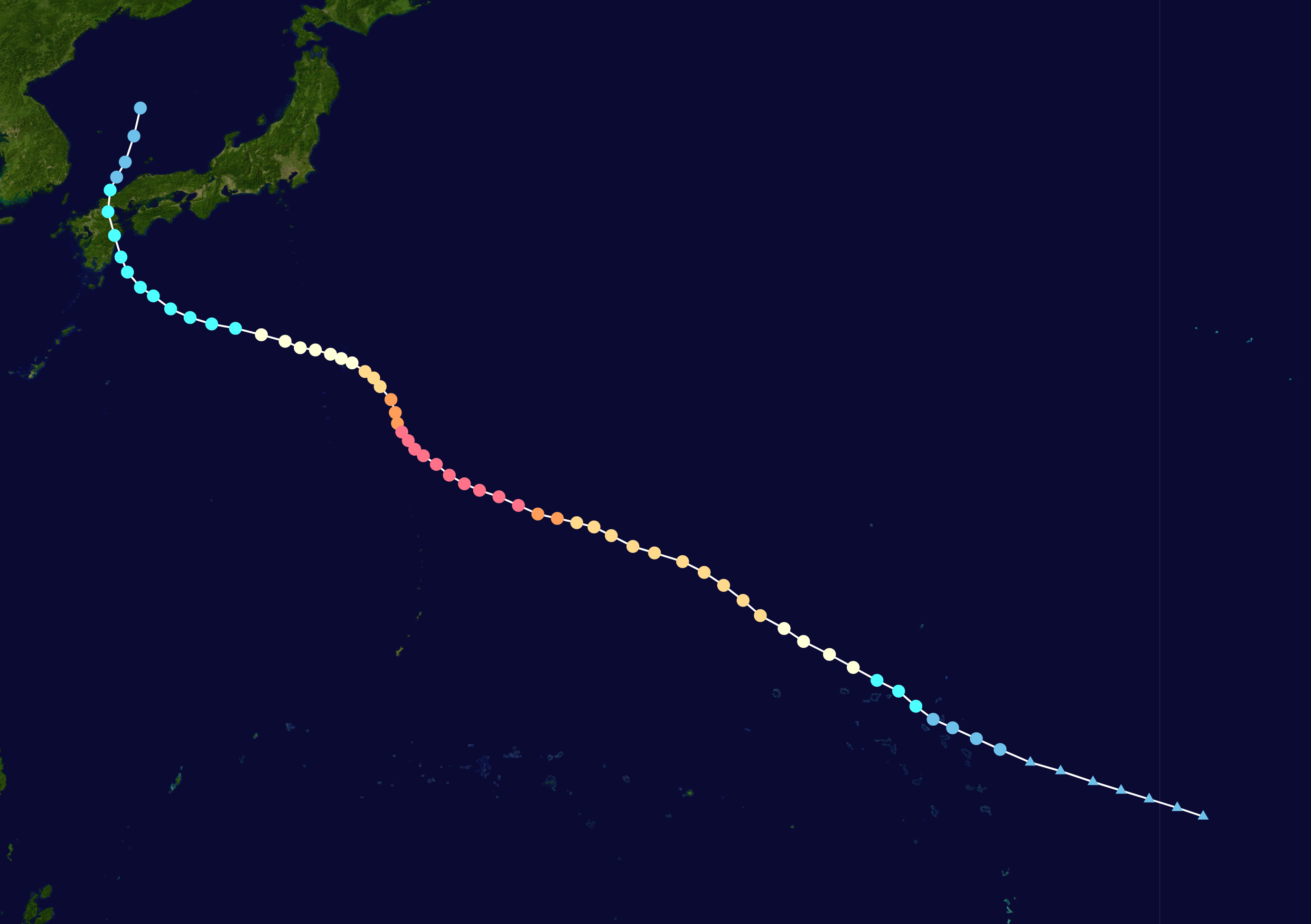
Map plotting the storm's track and intensity, according to the Saffir–Simpson scale Map key Saffir–Simpson scale Tropical depression (≤38 mph, ≤62 km/h) Tropical storm (39–73 mph, 63–118 km/h) Category 1 (74–95 mph, 119–153 km/h) Category 2 (96–110 mph, 154–177 km/h) Category 3 (111–129 mph, 178–208 km/h) Category 4 (130–156 mph, 209–251 km/h) Category 5 (≥157 mph, ≥252 km/h) Unknown Storm type Tropical cyclone Subtropical cyclone Extratropical cyclone, remnant low, tropical disturbance, or monsoon depression

As Typhoon Janis, the previous storm, intensified south of Guam, the tropical disturbance that later became Typhoon Kent developed east of the International Date Line. Its persistent convection prompted the Joint Typhoon Warning Center (JTWC) to start following the system at 06:00 UTC on August 3. Forty-eight hours later, the Japan Meteorological Agency (JMA) classified the system as a tropical depression. (Note: The Japan Meteorological Agency is the official Regional Specialized Meteorological Center for the western Pacific Ocean.) (Note: Wind estimates from the JMA and most other basins throughout the world are sustained over 10 minutes, while estimates from the United States-based Joint Typhoon Warning Center are sustained over 1 minute. 10-minute winds are about 1.14 times the amount of 1-minute winds.) An increase in the amount and organization of the disturbance's deep convection prompted the JTWC to issue a Tropical Cyclone Formation Alert at 15:00 UTC on August 5. The system began to a mature at a faster clip as it tracked west-northwest. The JTWC started issuing warnings three hours later, and at 00:00 UTC on August 6, the JTWC upgraded the depression into a tropical storm, with the JMA doing the same at 06:00 UTC. Eighteen hours later, the JTWC upgraded Kent to a typhoon, with the JMA declaring it a severe tropical storm.

After becoming a severe tropical storm, the rate of intensification slowed. On August 8, increased vertical wind shear associated with the passage of a mid-level trough to the north resulted in a reduction in the thickness of Kent's central dense overcast. Even though intensification was arrested (the JTWC and JMA estimated that the storm maintained winds of 160 km/h (100 mph) and 120 km/h (75 mph) for 30 and 42 hours respectively), a small core of persistent central convection remained. As the trough passed by, the re-appearance of an eye indicated that steady intensification had resumed. At noon on August 11, Kent was upgraded into a super typhoon by the JTWC. At the same time, the JTWC and JMA estimated that the typhoon attained its peak intensity of 240 km/h (150 mph) and 175 km/h (110 mph), with a minimum barometric pressure of 930 mbar (27 inHg).

Under the influence of a subtropical ridge located to its north, the typhoon maintained its intensity as it continued to move west-northwestward until a shortwave trough moved across Honshu on August 13. Kent subsequently slowed down and turned towards the north in response to the weakness in the subtropical ridge. Then, the trough passed by and the typhoon, which was by this time weakening due to increased wind shear, veered towards Honshu. On August 16, Kent began to interact with Tropical Storm Lois, which had formed two days earlier. As a consequence, Kent turned towards Kyushu. Later on August 16, the JMA and JTWC estimated that Kent lost typhoon intensity. At 00:00 UTC on August 18, Kent moved ashore over Kyushu, with the JTWC and JMA reporting winds of 115 km/h (70 mph) and 105 km/h (65 mph). Shortly thereafter the interaction between the tropical cyclones had ceased, and Kent was approaching recurvature. After landfall, interaction with the mountainous terrain of Kyushu, along with increased wind shear aloft, quickly weakened Kent. At midday on August 19, Kent was downgraded to a tropical depression by the JTWC after the center had become exposed from the deep convection. Both the JTWC and JMA ceased tracking Kent on August 20.

== Impact ==
Wettest tropical cyclones and their remnants in Japan Highest-known totals
Precipitation			Storm	Location	Ref.
Rank	mm	in	Storm	Location	Ref.
1	2781.0	109.50	Fran 1976	Hiso	
2	>2000.0	>78.74	Namtheun 2004	Kisawa	
3	1805.5	71.08	Talas 2011	Kamikitayama	
4	1518.9	59.80	Olive 1971	Ebino	
5	1322.0	52.04	Nabi 2005	Mikado	
6	1286.0	50.62	Kent 1992	Hidegadake	
7	1167.0	45.94	Judy 1989	Hidegadake	
8	1138.0	44.80	Abby 1983	Amagisan	
9	1124.0	44.25	Flo 1990	Yanase	
10	~1092.0	~43.00	Trix 1971	Yangitake	

Typhoon Kent was the third tropical cyclone to hit Japan during August 1992, following Tropical Storm Irving and Typhoon Janis. This was the second highest number of storms to hit Japan in a month. The typhoon dropped heavy rainfall across western portions of the Japanese archipelago. A peak rainfall total of 1,286 mm (50.6 in) occurred at Hidegadake. A peak hourly rainfall total of 64 mm (2.5 in) was observed in Mount Amagi. Meanwhile, a peak daily precipitation total of 633 mm (24.9 in) fell in Hidegdake. A wind gust of 94 km/h (58 mph) was recorded in the city of Tosashimizu. Nationwide, eight fatalities were reported and two others sustained injuries. A total of 1,561 houses were destroyed while 379 others were flooded. Moreover, two vessels were damaged. Many ferries linking Honshu and Kyushu were cancelled. Monetary damage totaled ¥1.9 billion (US$15 million).

Rough seas in Tokushima Prefecture swept away a family of six from the seaside with five dead and one seriously wounded, while in a separate incident, one person perished. Thirty-six houses were damaged in the prefecture and damage was estimated at ¥810 million. In Miyazaki Prefecture, all flights and trains were canceled. Around 300 homes lost power. A total of 143 homes were damaged and 168 homes were destroyed, which resulted in 931 people homeless in Kōchi Prefecture. Roads were damaged in 118 locations in Ehime Prefecture. Some flights were called off at Kagoshima Airport, where damage was estimated at ¥245 million. Over 400 m (1,310 ft) of beaches there were eroded. A swimmer was in critical condition in Tottori Prefecture due to high waves. Thirty-three ferries were canceled in Wakayama Prefecture. Thirty homes were damaged in Hyōgo Prefecture. Damage in Okayama Prefecture amounted to ¥297 million. Power lines were damaged in 606 locations in Hiroshima Prefecture and damage was at ¥358 million. Another person drowned in Kyoto Prefecture. Twelve flights were cancelled in Shimane Prefecture.

== See also ==
- Other tropical cyclones named Kent
- Typhoon Kinna (1991) - similar mid-season Japan-hitting Japan
