= List of storms named Gene =

The name Gene has been used two times in the Western Pacific:

- Typhoon Gene (1990) (T9021, 22W, Oyang) - hit Japan
- Tropical Storm Gene (1993) (T9323, 30W, Gundang) - did not affect land

The name Gene has been used two times in the South Pacific:

- Cyclone Gene (1992) - no threat to land
- Cyclone Gene (2008) - caused extensive practice to Fiji and Vanuatu
