= Typhoon Abby (1983) =

Pacific typhoon in 1983

Typhoon Abby (Diding)
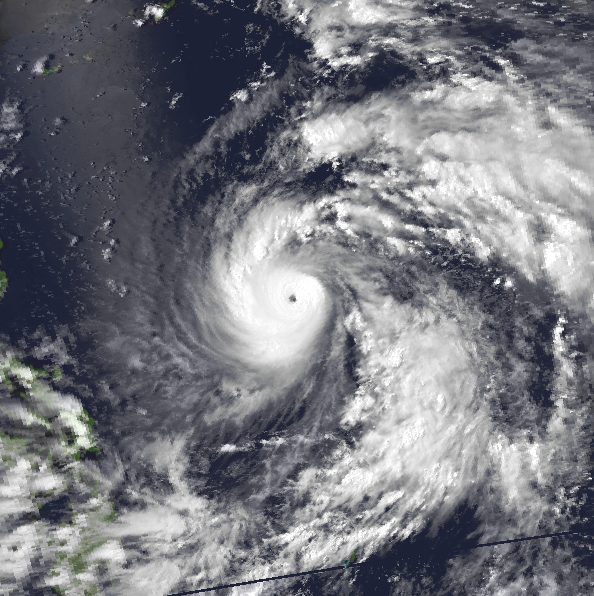
- Typhoon Abby on August 8

Meteorological history
- Formed: August 4, 1983
- Extratropical: August 18, 1983
- Dissipated: August 24, 1983

Violent typhoon
- 10-minute sustained (JMA)
- Highest winds: 220 km/h (140 mph)
- Lowest pressure: 895 hPa (mbar); 26.43 inHg

Category 5-equivalent super typhoon
- 1-minute sustained (SSHWS/JTWC)
- Highest winds: 270 km/h (165 mph)
- Lowest pressure: 888 hPa (mbar); 26.22 inHg

Overall effects
- Fatalities: 7 total (2 direct, 5 indirect)
- Injuries: 27
- Missing: 1
- Damage: Minimal
- Areas affected: Japan, Philippines
- IBTrACS
- Part of the 1983 Pacific typhoon season

Typhoon Abby, known in the Philippines as Typhoon Diding, was an extremely powerful tropical cyclone which was the second typhoon to strike Japan within a span of a few days in August 1983. First noted southeast of Guam on July 31, development of this system was initially slow to occur; it was first classified on August 5, and was upgraded into a tropical storm the next day. Intensification was rapid as Abby slowly recurved northward on August 7 and 8. After reaching peak intensity with winds of 140 mph (225 km/h) early on August 9, Abby slowly weakened, though the storm briefly re-intensified on August 11. By August 14, winds had diminished to 100 mph (160 km/h). Abby finally weakened back into a tropical storm on August 17 not long after making landfall in Japan. The following day, Abby completed the transition to an extratropical cyclone after moving through central Japan. However, meteorologists continued monitoring the storm for six more days.

In the Philippines, heavy rainfall resulted in a landslide that crushed a house in Manila, killing three people. Two others drowned due to rough seas. Typhoon Abby also brought several consecutive days of rain to southern and central Japan, resulting in widespread damage. Commercial traffic by land, sea, and air was also paralyzed by the cyclone, stranding 25,900. Moreover, over 10,000 fishing boats took refuge in harbors. Around 3,400 homes were flooded and 24 homes were either damaged or destroyed. Additionally, 89 roads were also damaged. About a dozen people were injured during a flash flood that destroyed three houses. Three more dwellings were washed away when a river overflowed its banks. Nationwide, 27 people were hurt and two persons were killed. One person was listed as missing.

== Meteorological history ==
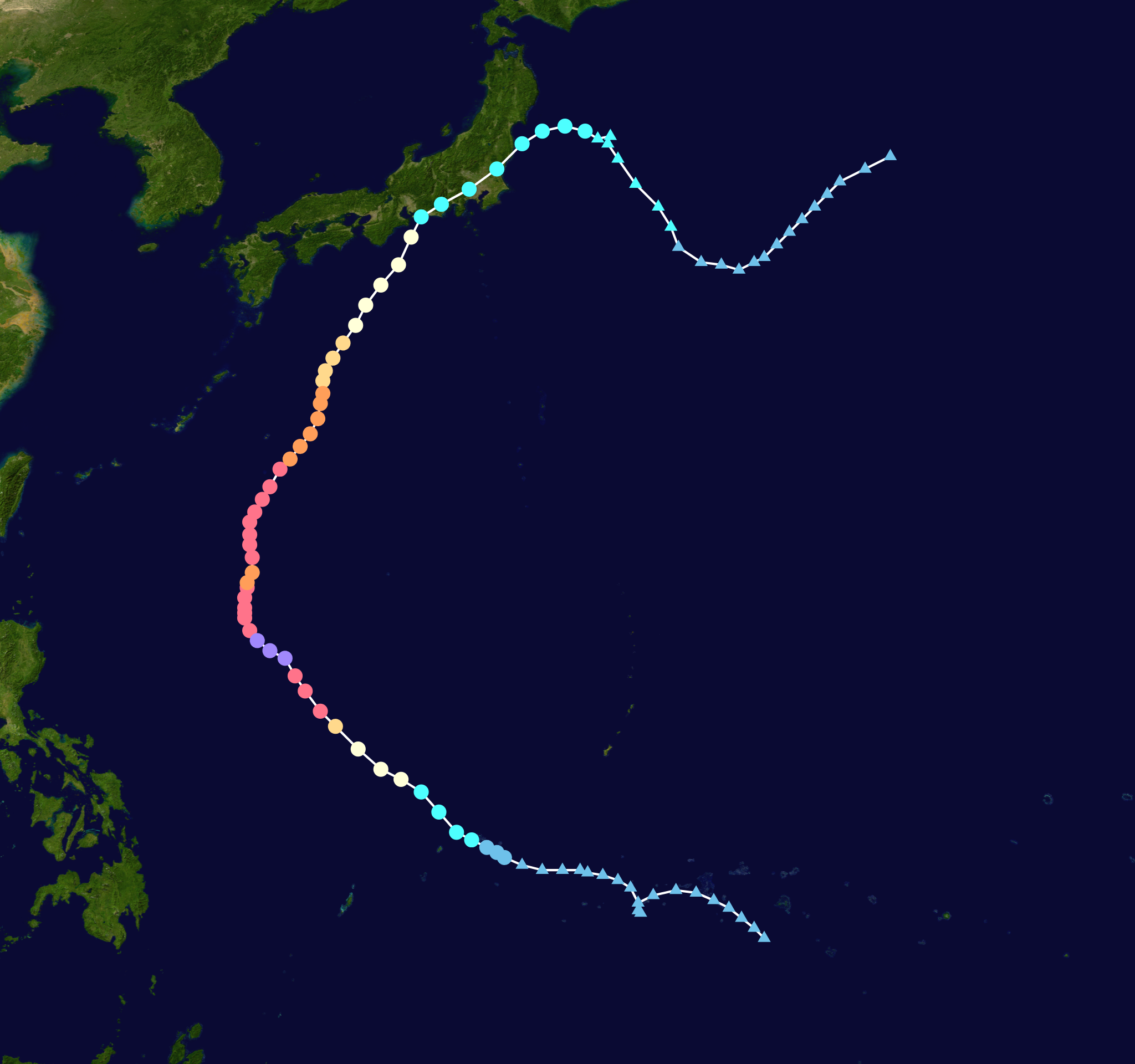
Map plotting the storm's track and intensity, according to the Saffir–Simpson scale Map key Saffir–Simpson scale Tropical depression (≤38 mph, ≤62 km/h) Tropical storm (39–73 mph, 63–118 km/h) Category 1 (74–95 mph, 119–153 km/h) Category 2 (96–110 mph, 154–177 km/h) Category 3 (111–129 mph, 178–208 km/h) Category 4 (130–156 mph, 209–251 km/h) Category 5 (≥157 mph, ≥252 km/h) Unknown Storm type Tropical cyclone Subtropical cyclone Extratropical cyclone, remnant low, tropical disturbance, or monsoon depression

Typhoon Abby originated from an area of enhanced convective activity southeast of Guam on July 31. While moving south of Guam, the area failed to organized significantly until August 3, when thunderstorm activity increased in coverage. Based on this, a Tropical Cyclone Formation Alert was issued at 2300 UTC. Initially, the system struggled to develop a closed atmospheric circulation. However, a Hurricane Hunter aircraft investigated the system early on August 5 and was able to locate a closed surface circulation. Based on this, both the Joint Typhoon Warning Center (JTWC) and the Japan Meteorological Agency (JMA) upgraded the system into a tropical depression. (Note: The Japan Meteorological Agency is the official Regional Specialized Meteorological Center for the western Pacific Ocean.) Following an increase in organization, both agencies upgraded the system into a tropical storm.

Although forecast by the JTWC to move west, Abby instead veered west-northwest while slowly deepening. At 1800 UTC on August 6, both the JMA and the JTWC upgraded Abby to typhoon status when an eye began to form within the central dense overcast, a large mass of deep convection. On August 7, the storm began to intensify at a much faster rate than expected by the JTWC. Later that day, the JMA estimated 10-minute sustained winds of 185 km/h (115 mph). After briefly leveling off in intensity, the JTWC reported winds of 230 km/h (145 mph). Twelve hours later, the JTWC estimated maximum winds of 245 km/h (150 mph), making Abby a super typhoon. Even though a Hurricane Hunter aircraft measured a pressure of 888 mbar (26.2 inHg), the JMA estimated peak winds of 230 km/h (145 mph) and a minimum pressure of 895 mbar (26.4 inHg) early on August 9.

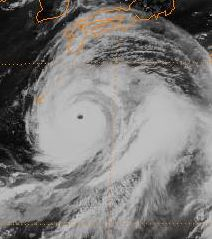
Typhoon Abby on August 13

After maintaining peak intensity for several hours, Abby began to weaken as its forward speed slowed. Meanwhile, the JTWC forecast the storm to a turn to the northwest around a subtropical ridge. On August 11, JMA reduced the intensity of the storm to 180 km/h (110 mph), but several hours later, the storm suddenly restrengthened, attaining winds of 200 km/h (125 mph). However, this trend was short lived and Abby steadily weakened as it made the long anticipated turn to the northeast in the general direction of Japan. On August 12, two tropical cyclones developed in the South China Sea, but due to the massive size of Abby, this had little effect on the typhoon. On August 14, however, the eye of Abby began to become less defined. Based on this, the JTWC decreased the intensity of the storm to 185 km/h (115 mph) while the JMA reported winds of 160 km/h (100 mph). According to the JMA, the storm maintained its intensity for a day, but on the following day, the storm weakened slightly. By August 16, wind estimates from both agencies were equivalent to Category 1 intensity. Continuing to trek north-northwest, the JTWC downgraded into a tropical storm at 0000 UTC on August 17,. Shortly thereafter, Abby moved ashore Hamamatsu and began to turn northeast, encountering rugged terrain near Tokyo. At noon, the JMA downgraded Abby into a severe tropical storm; simultaneously, the JTWC classified Abby as an extratropical cyclone. However, the JMA did not follow suit until 1800 UTC on August 18. Despite being extratropical, the JMA kept monitoring the system until August 24.

== Preparations and impact ==
Wettest tropical cyclones and their remnants in Japan Highest-known totals
Precipitation			Storm	Location	Ref.
Rank	mm	in	Storm	Location	Ref.
1	2781.0	109.50	Fran 1976	Hiso	
2	>2000.0	>78.74	Namtheun 2004	Kisawa	
3	1805.5	71.08	Talas 2011	Kamikitayama	
4	1518.9	59.80	Olive 1971	Ebino	
5	1322.0	52.04	Nabi 2005	Mikado	
6	1286.0	50.62	Kent 1992	Hidegadake	
7	1167.0	45.94	Judy 1989	Hidegadake	
8	1138.0	44.80	Abby 1983	Amagisan	
9	1124.0	44.25	Flo 1990	Yanase	
10	~1092.0	~43.00	Trix 1971	Yangitake	

Prior to affecting Japan, rains partially related to the system affected the Philippines. In Manila, a landslide crushed a house. Three teenagers were killed and two others were injured. Furthermore, two women also drowned due to rough seas. On August 12, although far offshore Japan at that time, high waves were reported along the Pacific coast of Okinawa. Two days later, heavy rains began to drench the nation and continued through August 17. Throughout the storm, three weather stations recorded more than 1,000 mm (39 in) of rain, Amagisan measured a peak total of 1,138 mm (44.8 in), Hakone saw 1,103 mm (43.4 in), and 1,035 mm (40.7 in) fell in Lake Yamanaka. Moreover, Amagisan also saw observed 24-hours and hourly totals of 627 mm (24.7 in) and 73 mm (2.9 in) respectively.

Typhoon Abby brought widespread damage to Japan, becoming the second storm to strike the country in a week. Ferry services were interrupted to the outer islands of the nation, which stranded 3,900 persons in Yoron. Some local air services were also suspended, stranding 4,000 tourists. Typhoon alerts were necessitated for Shikoku, Kyushu, and Honshu. At least 10,300 fishing boats took refuge in harbors. A swimmer drowned in the lake on the western tip of Honshu; a fisherman was swept away by high waves off Kamogawa. A dozen people were injured during a flash flood that destroyed three houses just west of Tokyo. Three houses were washed away and two people injured when a river 100 mi (160 km) west of Tokyo overflowed its banks. Major railway lines halted operations throughout central Japan while many other trains arrived late, leaving 18,000 individuals stranded. Throughout the nation, 24 homes were damaged or destroyed while 3,400 others were flooded, displacing 2,700 persons in eight provinces. In all, 19 bridges and two breakwaters were washed away, which resulted in 83 landslides. Eighty-nine roads were damaged, of which 50 were closed, trapping thousands of travelers. Nationwide, 29 people were hurt. However, only two deaths were attributed from the storm, though one person was missing.

== See also ==
- Pacific typhoon
