= Typhoon Gene =

Pacific typhoon in 1990

Typhoon Gene (Oyang)
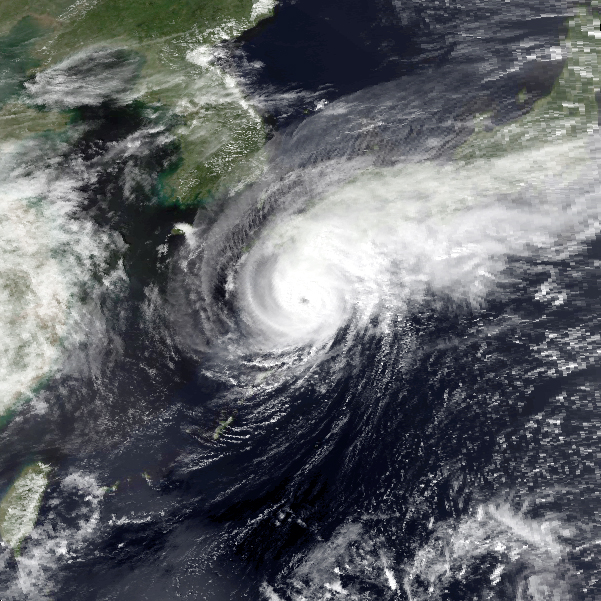
- Typhoon Gene on September 29, 1990

Meteorological history
- Formed: September 22, 1990
- Extratropical: September 30, 1990
- Dissipated: October 1, 1990

Typhoon
- 10-minute sustained (JMA)
- Highest winds: 150 km/h (90 mph)
- Lowest pressure: 950 hPa (mbar); 28.05 inHg

Category 1-equivalent typhoon
- 1-minute sustained (SSHWS/JTWC)
- Highest winds: 150 km/h (90 mph)
- Lowest pressure: 963 hPa (mbar); 28.44 inHg

Overall effects
- Fatalities: 6 direct
- Damage: $158 million (1990 USD)
- Areas affected: Japan
- IBTrACS
- Part of the 1990 Pacific typhoon season

Typhoon Gene, known in the Philippines as Typhoon Oyang, struck Japan during late September 1990. An area of disturbed weather formed several hundred kilometers south-southeast of Okinawa on September 18. Gradual development occurred as it tracked generally westward, and on September 22, the disturbance developed into a tropical depression. The depression intensified into a tropical storm the next day. Continuing to steadily intensify, Gene turned northwest and became a severe tropical storm on September 25. In the evening, Gene was declared a typhoon, and on September 26, attained its maximum intensity. Gene leveled off in intensity while recurving towards Japan. After brushing Kyushu and Shikoku on September 29 and Honshu on September 20, Gene weakened back to a tropical storm. On September 30, Gene transitioned into an extratropical cyclone, which was last noted on October 1.

The typhoon hit the Japanese archipelago ten days after Typhoon Flo, which killed 40 people. The southwestern portion of the country suffered the worst damage from the typhoon. Nationwide, six fatalities were reported and twenty others sustained injuries. In Miyazaki Prefecture, three people were killed and ten others were wounded. Throughout the prefecture, 4,688 houses were damaged and ninety-two others were destroyed, which led to 18,449 homeless. A total 210 houses were destroyed while 13,318 others were flooded. Elsewhere, 229 houses were damaged in Kagoshima Prefecture and seventy more were destroyed; consequently, 194 people lost their homes. There, almost 30,000 homes lost power. Overall, there were 340 landslides and roads were damaged at 182 locations. All Nippon Airways cancelled ninety domestic flights and Japan Airlines cancelled ten flights. Over 200,000 people were affected by cancellation of flights and train services. Thirty-one ships and 10,560 acres (4,270 hectares) of farmland were damaged. Monetary damage estimates reached ¥22.9 billion yen or $158 million USD in 1990 values.

== Meteorological history ==
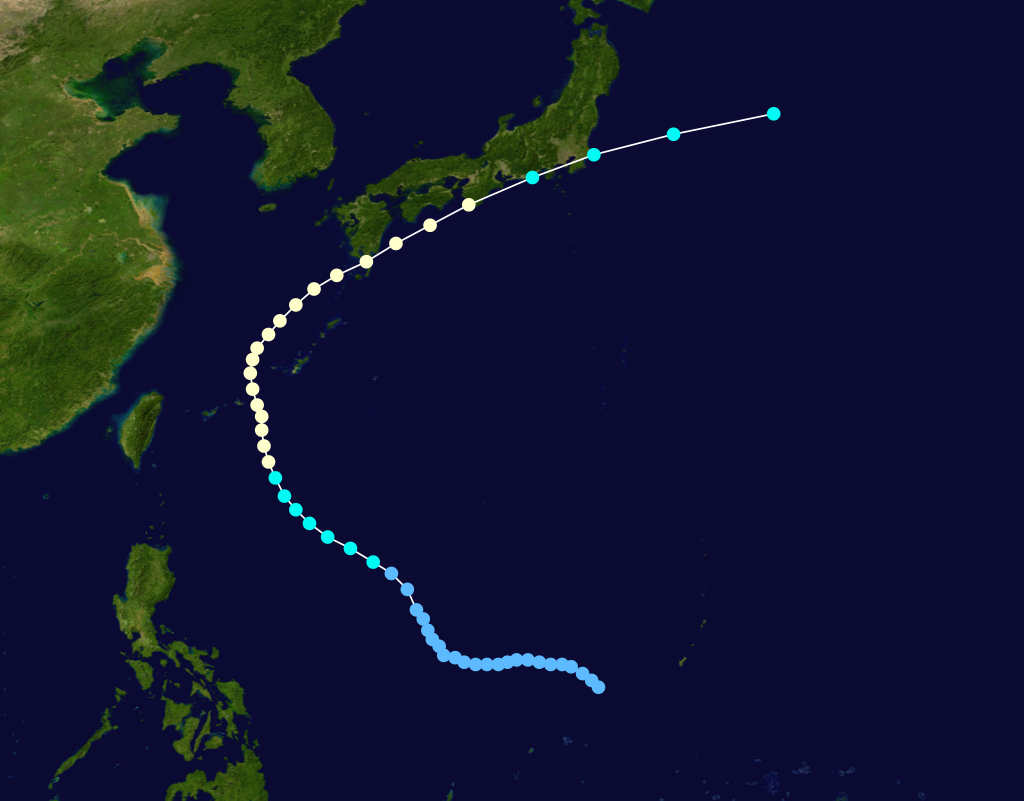
Map plotting the storm's track and intensity, according to the Saffir–Simpson scale Map key Saffir–Simpson scale Tropical depression (≤38 mph, ≤62 km/h) Tropical storm (39–73 mph, 63–118 km/h) Category 1 (74–95 mph, 119–153 km/h) Category 2 (96–110 mph, 154–177 km/h) Category 3 (111–129 mph, 178–208 km/h) Category 4 (130–156 mph, 209–251 km/h) Category 5 (≥157 mph, ≥252 km/h) Unknown Storm type Tropical cyclone Subtropical cyclone Extratropical cyclone, remnant low, tropical disturbance, or monsoon depression

The origins of Typhoon Gene, the fifth tropical cyclone of September 1990, can be traced back to an area of disturbed weather with a surface pressure of 1008 mbar (29.8 inHg) first noted by the Joint Typhoon Warning Center (JTWC) at 06:00 UTC early on September 18. Little development occurred over the next five days, although the Japan Meteorological Agency (JMA) classified the disturbance as a tropical depression on the morning of September 22. (Note: The Japan Meteorological Agency is the official Regional Specialized Meteorological Center for the western Pacific Ocean.) A Tropical Cyclone Formation Alert (TCFA) was issued at 06:00 UTC on September 23, followed by an increase in the disturbance's organization. Around that time, the system was located roughly 1,170 km (725 mi) south-southeast of Okinawa. Further development was aided by a tropical upper tropospheric trough to its west and the warm ocean waters of the Kuroshio Current. Initially, the disturbance tracked generally westward, south of a subtropical ridge. Shower activity steadily increased and a Dvorak estimate of T2.0/55 km/h (35 mph) prompted the JTWC to designate it a tropical depression midday on September 23. Twelve hours later, the JMA reported that the depression had strengthened into a tropical storm, (Note: Wind estimates from the JMA and most other basins throughout the world are sustained over 10 minutes, while estimates from the United States-based Joint Typhoon Warning Center are sustained over 1 minute. 10-minute winds are about 1.14 times the amount of 1-minute winds.) and after the system improved in organization and its outflow expanded, the JTWC followed suit. At this time, Tropical Storm Gene was situated 980 km (610 mi) south-southeast of Okinawa.

Tropical Storm Gene intensified at the climatological rate of one T number per day as it tracked westward on a course initially resembling a straight runner. At 00:00 UTC on September 25, the JMA classified Gene as a severe tropical storm. The storm then turned northwest as it approached a break in the subtropical ridge. Although restricted upper-level outflow prevented rapid intensification, a Dvorak intensity estimate of T4.0/120 km/h (75 mph) lead to both agencies to declare Gene a typhoon on the evening of September 25. Around the time of the upgrade, Gene was located 380 km (235 mi) south-southwest of Okinawa. At 00:00 UTC on September 26, the JMA raised its intensity to 130 km/h (80 mph) for its maximum sustained winds, while the agency also estimated a minimum pressure of 965 mbar (28.5 inHg). However, the JTWC suggested that Gene was still slowly strengthening, and did not attain its maximum intensity of 90 mph (145 km/h) until 18:00 UTC that day.

Gene recurved to the northeast on September 27 in response to a shortwave trough while passing through the Ryukyu Islands. According to the JTWC, Gene maintained its peak intensity until 06:00 UTC on September 29, although the JMA estimated that a weakening trend had begun six hours earlier. The typhoon continued to recurve and skirted Kyushu and Shikoku on September 29 before tracking just south of Honshu the following day. Based on surface observations, the JTWC downgraded Gene into a tropical storm at 06:00 UTC that day, with the JMA doing the same at around the same time. The JMA classified Gene as an extratropical cyclone at noon, even though the JTWC did not follow suit until six hours later. Finally, the JMA stopped tracking the extratropical remnants of Gene on October 1.

== Impact ==
The typhoon dropped heavy rainfall across much of the Japanese archipelago. A peak rainfall total occurred of 619 mm (24.4 in) in the city of Miyazaki, 563 mm (22.2 in) of which fell in a 24-hour time span. A peak hourly rainfall total of 91 mm (3.6 in) was observed at Shimizu. Moreover, a maximum wind gust of 159 km/h (99 mph) was recorded on Muroto. In Tokushima Prefecture, a minimum central pressure of 970 mbar (28.6 inHg) was observed.

In Okinawa Prefecture, one person was hurt and damage accumulated to ¥77.2 million yen. On Shikoku Island, little damage was reported. A total of 214 homes were damaged in Kōchi Prefecture and ten others were leveled. There were also eleven landslides. Damage in the prefecture totaled ¥1.2 billion yen. Two people were killed in Miyazaki Prefecture because of landslides and another drowned into a river, and an additional ten were wounded. Throughout the prefecture, 4,688 houses suffered damage, while an additional ninety-two dwellings were destroyed, which led to 18,449 homeless. Furthermore, 2,700 households lost power in the city Miyazaki while 8,339 households lost power in Nichinan. Prefecture-wide, damage totaled ¥10.8 billion yen, primarily from the western portion of the prefecture. In Kagoshima Prefecture, five people suffered injuries, including two in a landslide. A total of 229 houses were damaged and seventy more were destroyed; consequently, 194 people lost their homes. In the town of Takayama, located in Kagoshima Prefecture, over 100,000 fish died. According to authorities, nearly 30,000 residencies were left without power. Across the prefecture, damage amounted to ¥15.3 billion yen. Throughout the entire island of Kyushu, 150 national flights were cancelled.

In Wakayama Prefecture, sixty-seven homes were damaged and damage was estimated at ¥187 million yen. Four buildings were destroyed in Shingu City, resulting in twenty homeless. Three flights were cancelled and three others were delayed at the Okayama Airport. Elsewhere, in Kanagawa Prefecture, heavy rains triggered fifty-nine landslides. A total of 1,713 homes were damaged and 915 others were destroyed, which resulted in 2,956 homeless individuals. Ninety bullet trains were cancelled between Tokyo and Osaka. In nearby Oshima Subprefecture, heavy rains forced the closure of nine roads. Throughout Tokyo, eight structures were damaged and twelve flights were delayed. A 49-year-old man was killed in a landslide in Shizuoka. Across Shizuoka prefecture, heavy rains caused 143 landslides. There, 1,697 homes were damaged, with 144 others destroyed. Roads were damaged in 162 locations. Nearly 900 ha (2,225 acres) of arable land was inundated. In Mie Prefecture, two people were presumed dead after they drowned in a river and three others were hurt. A total of 1,079 homes were damaged and thirty-nine others were demolished, which resulted in 130 people homeless. Damage there was assessed at ¥2.62 billion yen. At the Narita International Airport, sixty-eight flights were delayed. In Chiba Prefecture, there was one minor injury. A total of 213 houses were destroyed and eighteen others were damaged. Embankments were damaged at eighty-five sites across the prefecture. Seventy-five individuals lost their homes in Yamanashi Prefecture, where damage totaled to ¥716 million yen. Elsewhere, 304 dwellings were damaged and twenty-eight were demolished along coastal areas of Saitama Prefecture. Damage in Gunma prefecture totaled ¥53.8 million yen.

The typhoon hit the Japanese archipelago ten days after Typhoon Flo, which claimed forty lives and caused over $4 billion in damage. The storm also forced the cancellation of the final round of the Top Cup Tokai Classic. Much of the southwestern portion of the country suffered the worst damage from the typhoon. Nationwide, six fatalities were reported and twenty others sustained injuries. A total 210 houses were destroyed while 13,318 others were flooded. Landslides triggered by heavy rain were reported at 340 places and roads were damaged at 182 locations. All Nippon Airways cancelled ninety domestic flights and Japan Airlines cancelled ten flights. More than 200,000 people were affected by cancellation of flights and train services. Thirty-one ships and 10,560 acres (4,273 ha) of farmland were damaged. Monetary damage totaled ¥22.9 billion yen or US$158 million. (Note: All currencies are converted from Japanese yen to United States Dollars using this with an exchange rate of the year 1990.) (Note: All damage totals are in 1990 values of their respective currencies.)

== See also ==
- Other typhoons named Gene
- Typhoon Hal (1985)
