= Typhoon Flo (1990) =

Pacific typhoon in 1990

Typhoon Flo (Norming)
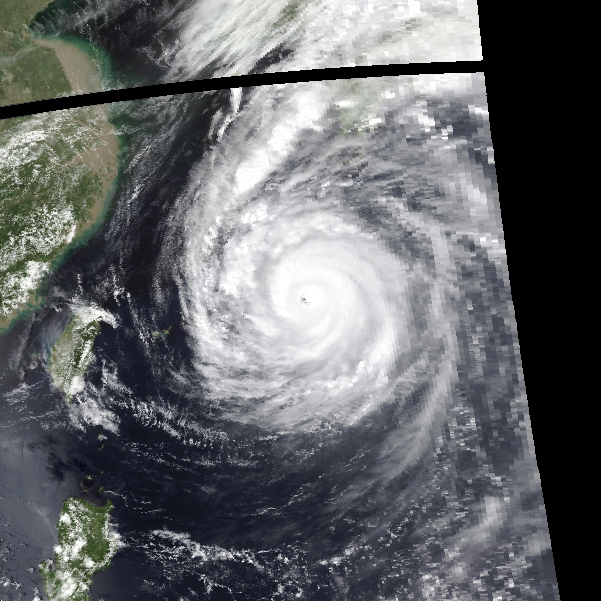
- Flo after peak intensity on September 17

Meteorological history
- Formed: September 8, 1990
- Extratropical: September 20, 1990
- Dissipated: September 22, 1990

Violent typhoon
- 10-minute sustained (JMA)
- Highest winds: 220 km/h (140 mph)
- Lowest pressure: 890 hPa (mbar); 26.28 inHg

Category 5-equivalent super typhoon
- 1-minute sustained (SSHWS/JTWC)
- Highest winds: 270 km/h (165 mph)
- Lowest pressure: 891 hPa (mbar); 26.31 inHg

Overall effects
- Fatalities: 40 total
- Damage: $918 million (1990 USD)
- Areas affected: Japan
- Part of the 1990 Pacific typhoon season

Typhoon Flo, known in the Philippines as Super Typhoon Norming, was a long-lived typhoon that brought destruction to much of Japan during September 1990. Flo originated from an area of convection that first formed to the southeast of the Marshall Islands on September 7. Five days later, the disturbance obtained tropical depression status, and on September 13, intensified into a tropical storm. Tracking west-northwest as it rounded a subtropical ridge, Flo slowly deepened, and on September 15, became a typhoon. After developing an eye, Flo began to rapidly intensify, and on September 17, Flo attained peak intensity. Shortly thereafter, the typhoon began to recurve to the northeast towards Honshu in response to deepening troughs to the northwest and north of the system, which resulted in a weakening trend due to increased vertical wind shear despite remaining over warm water. On September 19, Flo made landfall on southern Honshu, becoming the first typhoon to hit the Kii Peninsula in 11 years, and thereafter started to transition into an extratropical cyclone. The extratropical remnants of Flo were last noted on the morning of September 22.

Typhoon Flo was the strongest system to affect Japan since 1959. For a period of three days, the typhoon dropped heavy rainfall across much of the Japanese archipelago, which inflicted damage in 44 of 47 prefectures. The typhoon also passed just east of Okinawa, coming close enough to drop heavy rainfall. There, four people were killed, four were hurt, and five vessels sunk. On the northeastern side of Shikoku Island, in Kagawa Prefecture, two people were killed, 1,748 homes were damaged, and another 116 homes were destroyed. Across the Amami Islands, 13 people were killed, 29 others were hurt, 917 homes were damaged, and an additional 446 houses were destroyed, resulting in 2,327 homeless individuals. In Okayama Prefecture on the main Japanese island of Honshu, ten people perished and nine others were injured. There, 2,810 homes were demolished, 4,675 others were damaged, and Flo was the worst typhoon to strike the prefecture since 1964. While damage in Tokyo was slight, 260,000 passengers were stranded after 117 trains along the Tōkaidō Shinkansen line were disrupted. Due to a prolonged period of heavy rain, partially caused by Flo, rainfall was 300% of normal in some locations on the island as of mid-September 1990 while sunshine time was a mere 64% of average in Hokkaido Prefecture. Overall, 40 fatalities were reported and 131 others sustained injuries. A total 16,541 houses were destroyed while 18,183 others were flooded. Additionally, 413 ships sunk and 10,365 acres (4,195 ha) of farmland were damaged. The typhoon flooded or cut roads at 418 locations and railroads at 31 spots while there were also greater than 450 landslides. A total of 337 flights were canceled by Japan's four major airlines (Japan Airlines, All Nippon Airways, Japan Air System, and Air Nippon) affecting around 33,000 passengers. Moreover, 245 trains were halted, leaving almost 300,000 stranded. Monetary damage amounted to ¥132 billion or US$918 million across the country. (Note: All damage totals are in 1990 values of their respective currencies.)

== Meteorological history ==
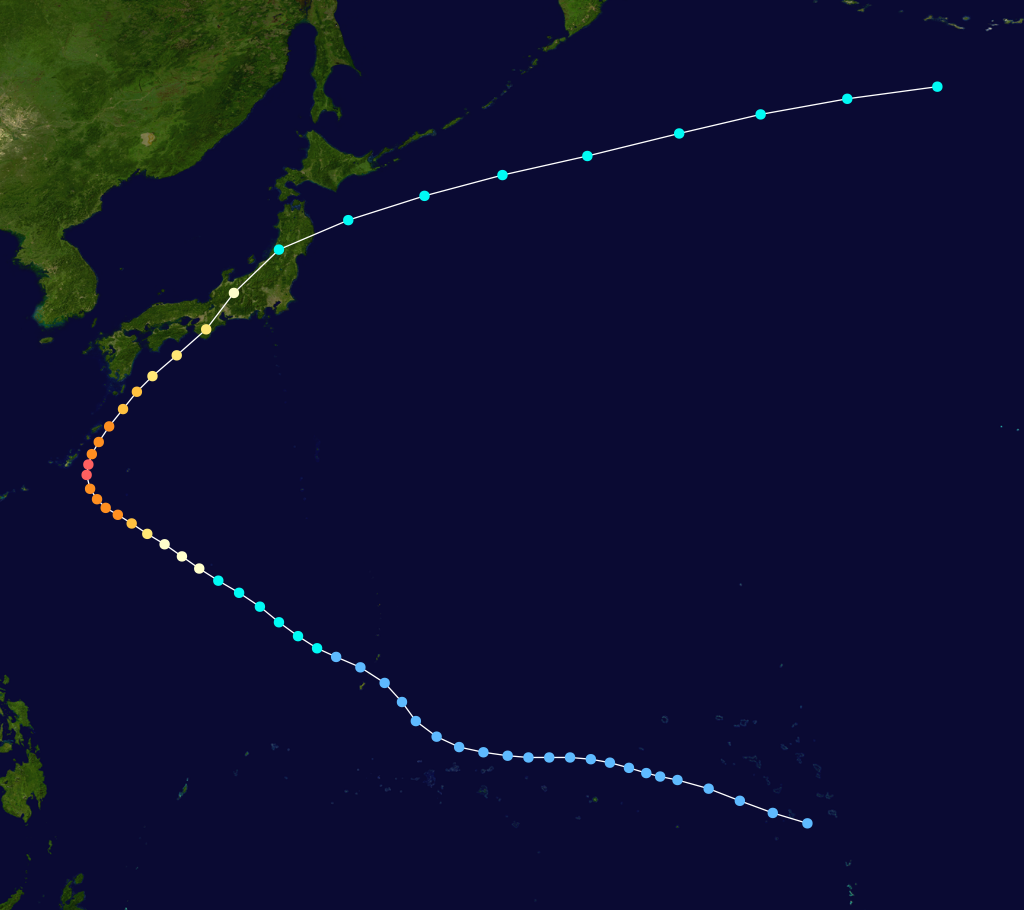
Map plotting the storm's track and intensity, according to the Saffir–Simpson scale Map key Saffir–Simpson scale Tropical depression (≤38 mph, ≤62 km/h) Tropical storm (39–73 mph, 63–118 km/h) Category 1 (74–95 mph, 119–153 km/h) Category 2 (96–110 mph, 154–177 km/h) Category 3 (111–129 mph, 178–208 km/h) Category 4 (130–156 mph, 209–251 km/h) Category 5 (≥157 mph, ≥252 km/h) Unknown Storm type Tropical cyclone Subtropical cyclone Extratropical cyclone, remnant low, tropical disturbance, or monsoon depression

The origins of Typhoon Flo can be traced to an area of convection that first formed to the southeast of the Marshall Islands on September 7. At 06:00 UTC the next day, the Joint Typhoon Warning Center (JTWC) started tracking the system while it was located about 430 km (270 mi) east-southeast of Guam. Initially, the disturbance tracked generally west-northwest as it remained weak. Over the next four days, the storm's convective structure slowly improved caused by an expansion of its equatorial outflow channel while also turning westward - on a course typical of a straight runner. On September 12, the Japan Meteorological Agency (JMA) classified the system as a tropical depression. (Note: The Japan Meteorological Agency is the official Regional Specialized Meteorological Center for the western Pacific Ocean.) Following the disturbance's development of a well-defined upper-level center and an additional increase in organization, aided by the subtropical jet the JTWC issued a Tropical Cyclone Formation Alert at 05:30 UTC that day. At 18:00 UTC on September 12, the JTWC declared the system a tropical depression. Six hours later, the JMA upgraded the depression into a tropical storm, with the JTWC followed suit based on Dvorak classifications of T2.5/65 km/h (40 mph).

Around this time, Flo began to track west-northwest at a pace of 23 km/h (14 mph) under the influence of a subtropical ridge to the north. Flo initially intensified at the climatological rate of one T number per day, and at 06:00 UTC on September 14, the JMA upgraded Flo to a severe tropical storm. Early the following day, both agencies classified Flo as a typhoon, (Note: Wind estimates from the JMA and most other basins throughout the world are sustained over 10 minutes, while estimates from the United States-based Joint Typhoon Warning Center are sustained over 1 minute. 10-minute winds are about 1.14 times the amount of 1-minute winds.) although operationally the JTWC did not upgrade Flo into a typhoon until 06:00 UTC, when the storm developed a small but circular eye. After becoming a typhoon, Flo began to rapidly intensify. Over the ensuing 36 hours, the JTWC estimated that Flo deepened by 130 km/h (80 mph). Midday on September 16, the JTWC upgraded Flo into a super typhoon, which is defined by the JTWC as a tropical cyclone with winds of at least 240 km/h (150 mph), although satellite intensity estimates suggested that Flo was even stronger. At 06:00 UTC on September 17, the JTWC raised the intensity of the typhoon to 265 km/h (165 mph), equal to Category 5 status on the United States-based Saffir-Simpson Hurricane Wind Scale (SSHWS); the basis for this was flight level observations from a Hurricane Hunter aircraft. Shortly thereafter, a dropsonde from the aircraft measured a barometric pressure of 891 mbar (26.3 inHg). Around this time, the JMA estimated the typhoon peaked in intensity, with winds of 225 km/h (140 mph) and a pressure of 890 mbar (26 inHg).

Around the time Flo peaked in intensity, the typhoon began to recurve to the northeast in response to a deepening mid-latitude shortwave trough to the northwest, which induced a break in the subtropical ridge. At 00:00 UTC on September 18, the JTWC estimated that the typhoon weakened back to a tropical storm. Weakening continued due to increased vertical wind shear, although the warm waters of the Kuroshio Current helped Flo maintain some of its intensity. Typhoon Flo accelerated northeastward towards Honshu in response to a trough passing north of the system. Around 06:00 UTC on September 19, the storm made landfall on southern Honshu, with the JTWC and JMA reporting winds of 170 km/h (105 mph) and 160 km/h (100 mph) respectively at the time of landfall. After passing over Japan, Flo began to transition into an extratropical cyclone. At 00:00 UTC on September 20, the JMA declared Flo extratropical, while the JTWC downgraded it to a tropical storm. Six hours later, the JTWC issued their last warning on the system because it had completed its extratropical transition. The extratropical remnants of Flo were last noted on the morning of September 22.

== Preparations ==
Wettest tropical cyclones and their remnants in Japan Highest-known totals
Precipitation			Storm	Location	Ref.
Rank	mm	in	Storm	Location	Ref.
1	2781.0	109.50	Fran 1976	Hiso	
2	>2000.0	>78.74	Namtheun 2004	Kisawa	
3	1805.5	71.08	Talas 2011	Kamikitayama	
4	1518.9	59.80	Olive 1971	Ebino	
5	1322.0	52.04	Nabi 2005	Mikado	
6	1286.0	50.62	Kent 1992	Hidegadake	
7	1167.0	45.94	Judy 1989	Hidegadake	
8	1138.0	44.80	Abby 1983	Amagisan	
9	1124.0	44.25	Flo 1990	Yanase	
10	~1092.0	~43.00	Trix 1971	Yangitake	

On September 17, 57 fights from Japan Airlines, Japan Air System, and All Nippon Airways to and from Naha were called off, stranding 57,000 passengers. Ferry service to and from Okinawa was halted and 403 schools were closed there that day. While preparing for the storm, two injures occurred in Tagajō. Flood warnings were issued on September 19 for Tokyo, Yokohama, and Chiba. Storm surge warnings were issued for the coastal areas of Yamanashi Prefecture.

== Impact ==
Typhoon Flo was the strongest system to affect Japan since 1959 and was the first typhoon to hit the Kii Peninsula in 11 years. For a period of three days, the typhoon dropped heavy rainfall across much of the Japanese archipelago, which caused damage in 44 of 47 prefectures. A peak rainfall total occurred of 1,124 mm (44.3 in) at Yanase Station. A peak hourly rainfall total of 1,124 mm (44.3 in) was observed in Setouchi. Meanwhile, a peak daily precipitation total of 543 mm (21.4 in) fell in Hidegadake. A wind gust of 151 km/h (94 mph) was recorded on Muroto. A minimum barometric pressure of 971.3 mbar (28.68 inHg) was recorded at Gifu, the fourth lowest pressure observed since observations at the station began in 1883.

Across Okinawa, the outer rainbands of the system was responsible for heavy rains. Four people were killed, including a 78-year-old women, and three others were rendered missing in the Okinawa island group. Four people were hurt. Offshore, six vessels were damaged, five of which sunk. In Naha, the capital of Okinawa, strong winds destroyed neon signs, tore away store-front shutters, and tossed bicycles across streets. On the northeastern side of Shikoku Island, in Kagawa Prefecture, two people were killed, one at sea and one elementary school student in Tonoshō that was crushed by a falling building, and two were wounded, 1,748 homes were damaged, and another 116 homes were destroyed. Damage there was estimated at ¥18.9 billion. Damage in Kōchi Prefecture amounted to ¥4.82 billion. On the eastern portion of Shikoku Island, in Tokushima Prefecture, one person fell and died, another was wounded, 852 homes were damaged, and 60 others were destroyed.

Typhoon Flo brought strong waves and high winds to Kyushu Island. In Nagasaki Prefecture, one person was injured. All flights to and from Nagasaki Airport on September 18 and September 19 were cancelled. A total of 1,500 ha (3,700 acres) of crops was destroyed in Oita Prefecture. To the southwest, 13 people were killed 12 due to landslides, while 29 others were wounded in the Amami Islands. A total of 917 homes were damaged and an additional 446 homes were destroyed, resulting in 2,327 homeless. Over 50,000 homes lost power. Damage in the prefecture totaled roughly ¥8 billion. In the city of Gokase, two people perished and another was hurt. A total of 40 flights, or 77% of all flights in Miyazaki Prefecture, were cancelled. Throughout Miyazaki Prefecture, 153 homes were damaged and 25 were destroyed, which resulted in 203 homeless. Nearly 19,000 residencies lost power. Four people died in Ehime Prefecture and damage amounted to ¥6.72 billion.

Along the southwestern portion of the island, in Tottori Prefecture, one person perished due to the typhoon. A total of 551 homes were damaged and 213 others were demolished. Nearly 3,000 ha (7,415 acres) of farmland were damaged. Total damage was estimated at ¥4.9 billion. The inner core of the typhoon passed over Kyoto Prefecture and lashed the region with high winds for several hours. A total of 52 homes were destroyed while 544 homes were damaged. Offshore, 20 ships were damaged. Prefecturewide, there were 120 landslides and four individuals were injured. Damage was assessed at ¥7.24 billion. Elsewhere, one person was killed and another was wounded in Shiga Prefecture. There, 927 homes were damaged and 118 were destroyed. Communication was downed at 870 locations and there were 82 landslides. Damage across the prefecture amounted to ¥5.5 billion. A total of 12,800 customers lost power and damage amounted to ¥1.06 billion in Hiroshima Prefecture. Starting on September 17, the typhoon deluged Okayama Prefecture with heavy rains that caused 72 landslides. Thirty-three roads and twelve bridges were damaged. Ten people died in the prefecture, including eight from landslides, one drowned in a river, and another died due to strong winds, while nine others suffered injuries. A total of 2,810 homes were leveled, and 4,675 homes were damaged. Roughly 25,000 homes were flooded. Prefecturewide, damage totaled ¥15.9 billion; Flo was the worst tropical cyclone to affect the area since Typhoon Kathy in 1964. In Hyogo Prefecture, two fatalities, as well as one injury, were reported. In addition, 9,069 homes were damaged while 1,644 other homes were flattened, leaving 2,585 homeless. On the southern tip of Honshu, in Wakayama prefecture, four people were hurt while the destruction of 124 dwellings left 451 individuals homeless and 124 other dwellings sustained damage. In Shingū, 16 homes were destroyed. In Nara Prefecture, 105 homes were damaged and 46 houses were destroyed while 4,300 residencies lost power.

Along the west coast of central Japan, in Toyama Prefecture, heavy rains caused 107 landslides while rough seas damaged nine ships. There, 49 homes were damaged and two others were destroyed. Four bridges were damaged and one was destroyed. Two people were killed and damage totaled ¥575 million. Almost 40% of all crops in the prefecture were destroyed. In Otani, 44 people were evacuated after a hotel collapsed. Across Nagano Prefecture, six homes were damaged. The typhoon spawned a tornado near Utsunomiya, which destroyed 30 houses, and damaged 182 other buildings. Damage from the tornado was assessed at ¥1.5 billion. Most of Tochigi Prefecture received heavy rains, which caused damage to 30 homes, 70 embankments, and two bridges. Roads were damaged in 52 spots. Moreover, 24 people were hurt and 1,311 people were homeless. Damage across the prefecture was estimated at ¥2.53 billion. Offshore Fukui Prefecture, 69 ships sunk. Onshore, six houses were damaged and there were thirteen landslides. Damage in the prefecture totaled ¥460 million. Strong winds damaged 17 structures in Gunma Prefecture and crop damage there amounted to ¥968 million. Additionally, 20 homes were flooded and 3,000 households lost power along coastal areas of Saitama Prefecture. Two people were wounded in Ibaraki Prefecture. In Gifu Prefecture, one person died and another was injured. A total of 343 homes were destroyed and 1,690 others were damaged, which led to 1,237 homeless. There were 247 landslides, seventeen bridges were damaged, and roads were damaged in 430 places. In Aichi Prefecture, 17 people were injured. Three hundred ninety-two homes were damaged and two others were destroyed. A total of 3,000 trees and 7,000 streets signs were downed. Damage throughout the prefecture totaled ¥1.04 billion. In Yamanashi Prefecture, one person was hurt and one hundred ten homes were damaged or destroyed, which resulted in 419 people homeless. Thirty-one trains were suspend. Damage there amounted to ¥1.95 billion. Two people were injured in Chiba Prefecture, where 648 ha (1,600 acres) of crops were damaged. Across Mie Prefecture, a combination of high winds and torrential rains damaged 392 homes and destroyed 66 others, which resulted in 760 people displaced from their home. Eight bridges were damaged and there were 166 landslides. Offshore, 16 vessels were damaged. Fifteen people were hurt and damage totaled ¥22.8 billion. Three people were wounded and a hundred one homes were damaged in Shizuoka Prefecture. Damage in Ōshima Subprefecture totaled ¥46.3 billion. On the Yamanashi Prefecture, damage totaled ¥1.87 billion. However, damage in the surrounding Tokyo area was minimal, and one person was injured. though 260,000 passengers were stranded after 117 trains along the Tōkaidō Shinkansen line were disrupted. In Kanagawa Prefecture, one person was wounded and fifteen houses were damaged.

Throughout Aomori Prefecture, 631 dwellings sustained flooding, including 25 homes in Aomori city, while 21 roads and 483 embankments were damaged. A total of 954 ha (2,360 acres) of apples were damaged and 191 households lost power in Hirosaki City. Damage in the prefecture was estimated at ¥8.26 billion , including ¥485 million from property. Further south, in Akita Prefecture, 206 homes were flooded, with 204 others damaged. There were also 54 landslides, 2 injuries, and 34 homeless. A total of 1,488 ha (3,680 acres) of crops were damaged, including 800 ha (1,975 acres) in Akita City. Late on September 19, the typhoon passed directly over Iwate Prefecture, where there were reports of 32 landslides, 1 fatality, and 275 flooded houses. Twenty-one bridges were destroyed and roads were damaged in 390 locations. Prefecturewide, damage exceeded ¥15.1 billion, including ¥11.7 billion in infrastructure damage, ¥2.15 billion in damage to agricultural facilities, and ¥670 million in crop damage. In Yusa Town, the roof of the town hall was destroyed. Four structures in Sakata City lost their roof. In Tsuruoka City, eight houses lost their roofs, which resulted in thirty-six homeless. A 72-year old drowned in the sewers of nearby Shiogama. Thirteen flights in and out of Sendai on September 20 were cancelled. A total of 40% of schools were closed due to lightning in the city. One hundred ten phone lines were also downed that would not be fixed until October 22. Throughout Miyagi prefecture, one person perished, two others were wounded, roads were damaged in 102 places, 1,139 homes were destroyed, and over 3,000 houses were damaged. Monetary damage in the prefecture totaled ¥150 billion. Elsewhere, in Fukushima Prefecture, 1,300 people lost power due to strong winds, and damage to crops totaled ¥143 million. Damage in Niigata Prefecture amounted to ¥643 million and 29 flights were cancelled to and from the prefecture. Seven homes were damaged in Ishikawa Prefecture. Along the northernmost island of the Japanese archipelago, in Hokkaido Prefecture, damage amounted to ¥6.8 billion. Due to a prolonged period of heavy rain caused by Flo, in conjunction with several other tropical cyclones, rainfall was 300% of normal in some locations on the island as of mid-September 1990 while sunshine time was a mere 64% of average. A landslide in Urakawa damaged one homes and injured two people, one seriously.

Nationwide, 40 fatalities were reported and 131 others sustained injuries. A total 16,541 houses were destroyed while 18,183 others were flooded. Additionally, 413 ships sunk and 10,365 acres (4,195 ha) of farmland were damaged. There were reports of over 450 landslides. The typhoon flooded or cut roads at 418 locations and railroads at 31 spots. A total of 337 flights were canceled by Japan's four major airlines - Japan Airlines, All Nippon Airways, Japan Air System and Air Nippon - affecting roughly 33,000 passengers. Moreover, 245 trains were halted, leaving almost 300,000 stranded. Monetary damage totaled ¥132 billion (US$918 million). (Note: All currencies are converted from Japanese yen to United States Dollars using this with an exchange rate of the year 1990.) (Note: All damage totals are in 1990 values of their respective currencies.)

== See also ==
- Typhoon Phanfone (2014)
- Typhoon Vera
