= Typhoon Judy (1989) =

Pacific typhoon in 1989

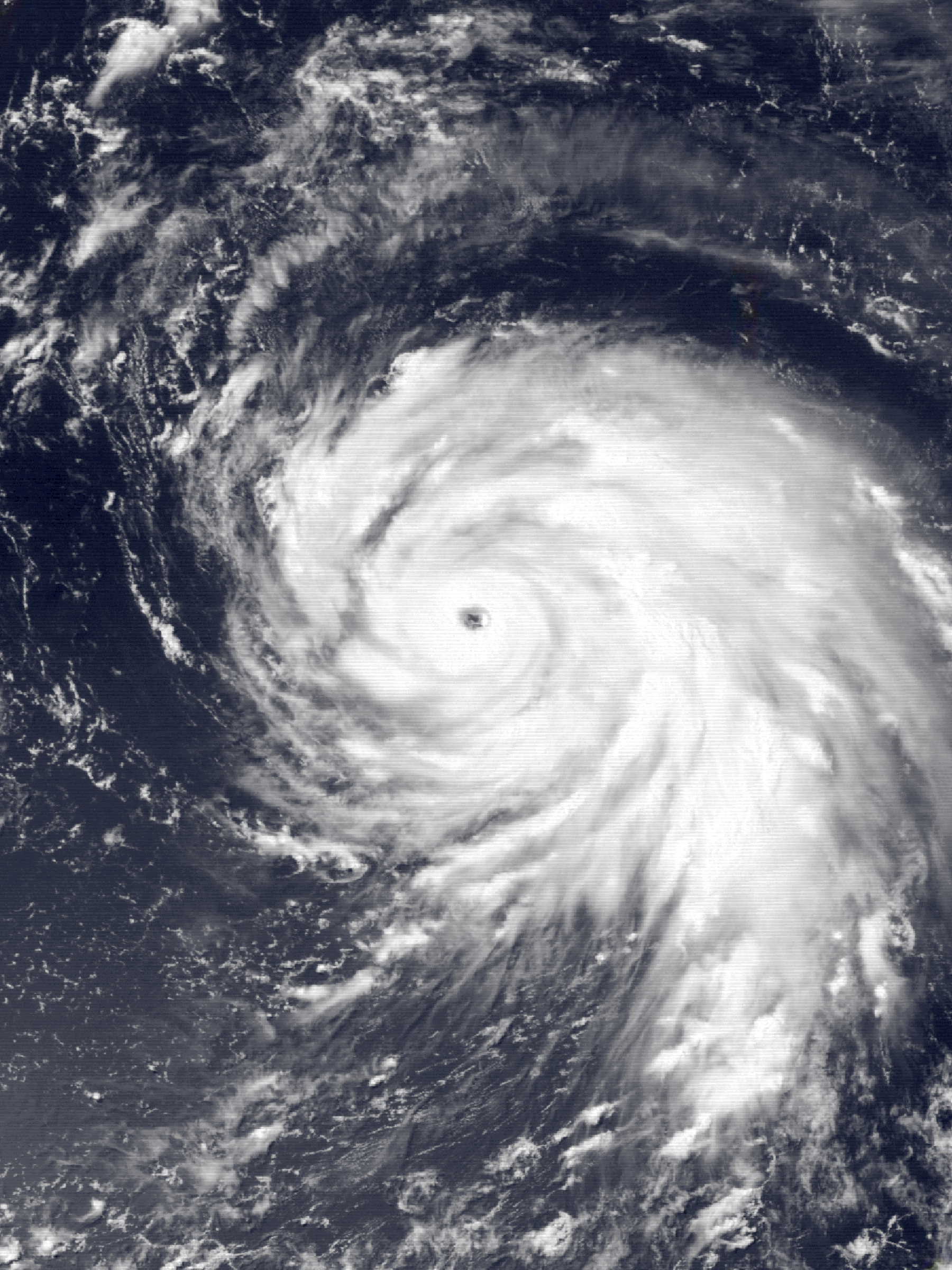
- Typhoon Judy near peak intensity on July 25

Meteorological history
- Formed: July 21, 1989
- Extratropical: July 29, 1989
- Dissipated: August 4, 1989

Very strong typhoon
- 10-minute sustained (JMA)
- Highest winds: 155 km/h (100 mph)
- Lowest pressure: 940 hPa (mbar); 27.76 inHg

Category 2-equivalent typhoon
- 1-minute sustained (SSHWS/JTWC)
- Highest winds: 175 km/h (110 mph)
- Lowest pressure: 949 hPa (mbar); 28.02 inHg

Overall effects
- Fatalities: 46 total
- Damage: $30.7 million (1989 USD)
- Areas affected: Japan, South Korea and Soviet Far East
- IBTrACS
- Part of the 1989 Pacific typhoon season

Typhoon Judy of July 1989 was a strong tropical cyclone that caused extensive damage and loss of life in Japan, South Korea and the eastern Soviet Union. Originating from a monsoon trough on July 21, Judy began as a tropical depression west of the Northern Mariana Islands. Tracking west-northwest, the system gradually intensified into a tropical storm and was given the name Judy on July 23. By this time, the storm had turned due north. Two days later, Judy attained typhoon status as it began a gradual turn to the west-northwest. Late on July 25, the storm peaked with winds of 165 km/h (105 mph). Striking Kyushu on July 27, interaction with the island's mountainous terrain caused Judy to quickly weaken as it neared South Korea. The weakened storm struck the country west of Pusan the following day before losing its identity near the border with North Korea. The remnants of Judy were last noted over the Sea of Japan.

In Japan, damaging winds from the typhoon left approximately 4 million people without power. Significant flooding in the country resulted in 11 deaths and $28.9 million in damage. In South Korea, heavy rains from the storm exacerbated ongoing floods, leading to at least 20 fatalities. Flooding from the remnants of Judy affected the Soviet Far East, temporarily severing the Trans-Siberian Railway and killing 15 people.

== Meteorological history ==
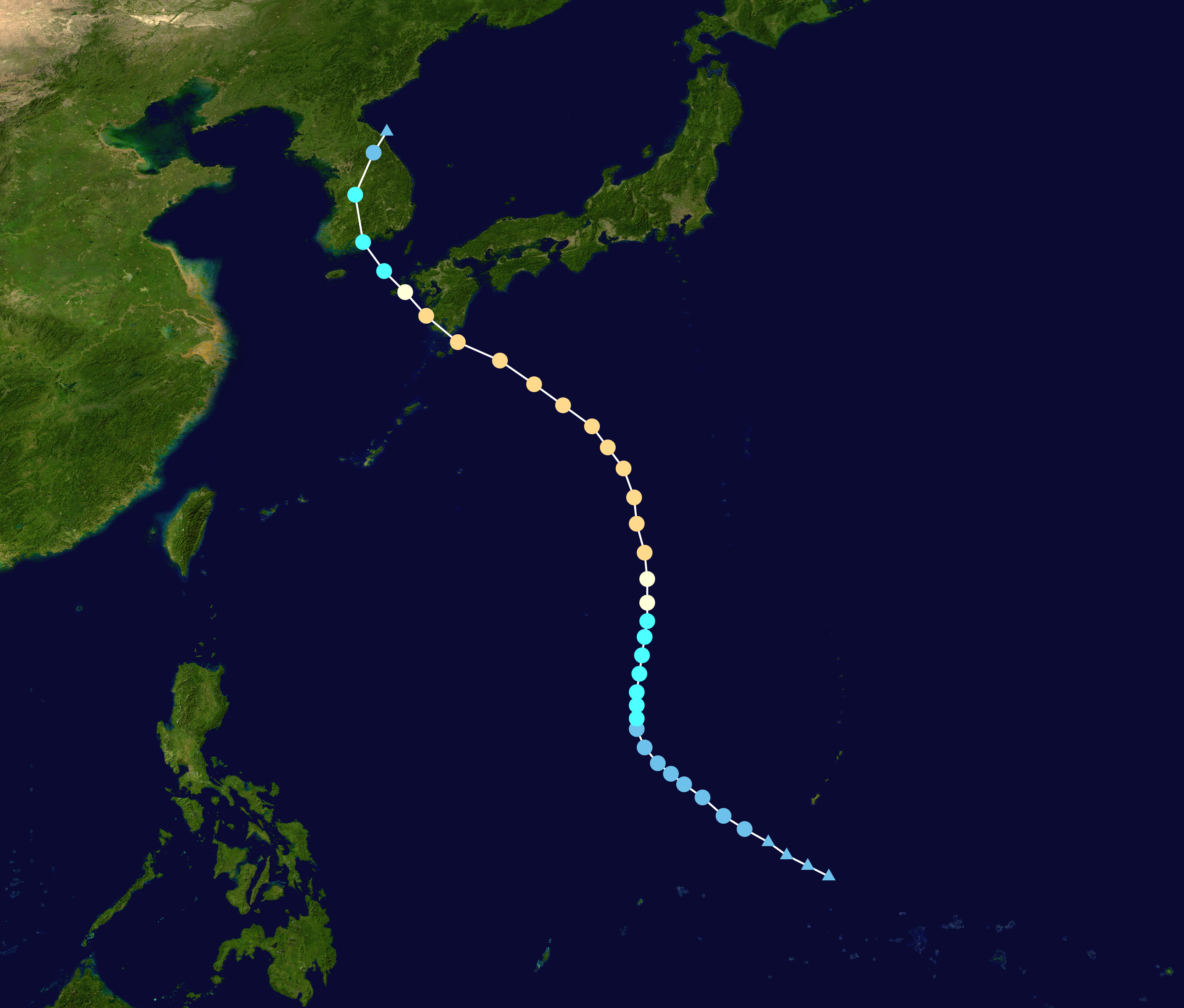
Map plotting the storm's track and intensity, according to the Saffir–Simpson scale Map key Saffir–Simpson scale Tropical depression (≤38 mph, ≤62 km/h) Tropical storm (39–73 mph, 63–118 km/h) Category 1 (74–95 mph, 119–153 km/h) Category 2 (96–110 mph, 154–177 km/h) Category 3 (111–129 mph, 178–208 km/h) Category 4 (130–156 mph, 209–251 km/h) Category 5 (≥157 mph, ≥252 km/h) Unknown Storm type Tropical cyclone Subtropical cyclone Extratropical cyclone, remnant low, tropical disturbance, or monsoon depression

In mid-July, a monsoon trough located west of the Northern Mariana Islands produced two tropical disturbances. The first of these tracked due west and later became Tropical Storm Irving. The second of these disturbances remained poorly organized and development into a tropical cyclone was expected to be slow. By July 21, an area of low pressure formed within the system and convection associated with it increased. Situated underneath an anticyclone, upper-level outflow also improved. Following further organization of the system, the Joint Typhoon Warning Center (JTWC) issued their first advisory on Tropical Depression 11W on July 21; (Note: The Joint Typhoon Warning Center is a joint United States Navy – United States Air Force task force that issues tropical cyclone warnings for the western Pacific Ocean and other regions.) at this time, the depression was located about 555 km (345 mi) west of Guam. Further aided by a tropical upper tropospheric trough to the northwest, the depression intensified into a tropical storm on July 23 and was assigned the name Judy by the JTWC.

On July 23, a subtropical ridge to the northeast of Judy caused the system to turn northward. This turn was not well anticipated by tropical cyclone forecast models. By July 25, satellite imagery indicated that Judy had intensified into a typhoon. Within hours of reaching this strength, the a weather buoy near the storm recorded a barometric pressure of 974 mb (hPa; 28.76 inHg) and winds of 105 km/h (65 mph). Strengthening continued throughout the day and Judy soon attained its peak intensity as a Category 2 equivalent typhoon on the Saffir–Simpson hurricane scale, with maximum sustained winds estimated at 175 km/h (110 mph). Around this time, the Japan Meteorological Agency assessed the typhoon to have attained ten-minute sustained winds of 155 km/h (95 mph) and a pressure of 940 mbar (hPa; 27.76 inHg). (Note: The Japan Meteorological Agency is the official Regional Specialized Meteorological Center for the western Pacific Ocean.)

On July 26, the typhoon turned towards the northwest and weakened somewhat. Late the next day, Judy struck the southern coast of Kyushu before moving over the Korea Strait. Interaction with the mountainous terrain of the island caused the storm to degenerate. Less than a day after moving over Kyushu, the system weakened to a tropical storm and soon made landfall in South Korea, roughly 205 km (127 mi) west of Pusan. Once onshore, rapid weakening took place with Judy being downgraded to a tropical depression within 12 hours. The remnants of Judy were last noted on July 29 over the Sea of Japan.

== Impact ==
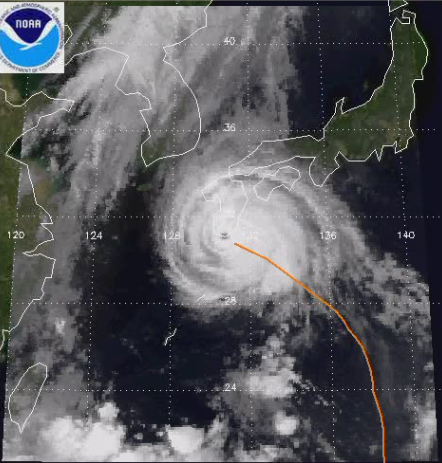
Typhoon Judy approaching Japan on July 27

On July 26, the Japan Meteorological Agency began warning residents of the typhoon's imminent arrival, stating that Judy would approach western parts of the country in two days. The following day, heavy rain and strong wind warnings were issued for much of Kyushu. Heavy rains from the storm affected much of southern Japan. Across Kyushu, rainfall rates exceeded 40 mm (1.6 in) per hour at times and many areas measured total rainfall over 500 mm (20 in). Significant flooding and landslides from the storm destroyed 25 homes and damaged many more. In Nichinan, Miyazaki, roughly 1,800 people evacuated as a river rose and threatened to flood parts of the city. Damaging winds from the storm, measured up to 180 km/h (110 mph) in Kagoshima, left roughly 4 million households without power. Train service throughout Kyushu was significantly disrupted, with 110,000 passengers stranded. Damage throughout the island was placed at $3.8 million. Agricultural losses from the storm reached 3.5 billion yen ($25.1 million). In all, Typhoon Judy killed 11 people in Japan, destroyed 76 homes and damaged 10,664 others.

On July 28, typhoon and heavy rain warnings were issued for all of South Korea. Numerous people in low-lying areas were evacuated. Thousands of vessels were also called to port to ride out the storm. Winds up to 125 km/h (80 mph) battered coastal areas of South Korea, uprooting many trees and leaving thousands without power. In Yeosu, hundreds of windows were blown out by the winds. Heavy rains, amounting to at least 335 mm (13.2 in) along the Yeongsan River, from the storm exacerbated ongoing floods in the country. In Pusan, 15 people were killed by the storm, 9 by landslides and 6 by structural collapse or flooding. Approximately 2,000 homes were damaged or destroyed in the city. In some areas, flood waters were "knee-deep." Throughout the country, 20 people were confirmed to have been killed by the storm; however, media reports indicated that 24 people perished. According to Korean officials, roughly 47,000 people were left homeless and losses reached 1.2 billion won (US$1.8 million). In the wake of Typhoon Judy, the South Korean Red Cross set up soup kitchens.

The remnants of Judy produced heavy rains in the Soviet Far East in early August, resulting in significant flooding. In Primorsky Krai, at least 15 people were killed by the floods which virtually cut off part of the Trans-Siberian Railway and washed out 267 bridges. A total of 109 settlements were also inundated. Approximately 120,000 hectares (300,000 acres) of land was underwater at the height of the floods. In addition to the loss of human life, 75,000 cattle drowned.

== See also ==
- 1989 Pacific typhoon season
- Typhoon Maemi
- Typhoon Rusa
