= List of named storms (J) =

Storms are named for historical reasons to avoid confusion when communicating with the public, as more than one storm can exist at a time. Names are drawn in order from predetermined lists. For tropical cyclones, names are assigned when a system has one-, three-, or ten-minute winds of more than 65 km/h (40 mph). Standards, however, vary from basin to basin. For example, some tropical depressions are named in the Western Pacific, while within the Australian and Southern Pacific regions, the naming of tropical cyclones are delayed until they have gale-force winds occurring more than halfway around the storm center.

This list covers the letter J.

== Storms ==
Note: † indicates the name was retired after that usage in the respective basin

- Jacinto (2025) – a tropical storm that affected Philippines and that made landfall in Vietnam.
- Jack

- 1977 – crossed over from the Australian basin but never impacted land.
- 1989 – a late-season category 4 typhoon that affected Guam.
- 1993 – analyzed it as a tropical depression, not as a tropical storm.
- 2014 – remained over open waters.

- Jackie

- 1948 – a Category 1 typhoon that made landfall in Taiwan and Eastern China.
- 1967 – a tropical cyclone that remained over open waters.

- Jacob

- 1985 – a powerful Category 4 tropical cyclone that had only minor impact on Australia.
- 1996 – the Kimberley and Pilbara coastal areas received heavy rains as the cyclone passed offshore.
- 1999 – analyzed it as a tropical depression, not as a tropical storm.
- 2007 – made landfall east of Port Hedland, Western Australia.

- Jaguar (2019) – a rare South Atlantic subtropical storm.
- Jal (2010) – a severe cyclonic storm that killed 118 people.
- Jamala (2013) – stayed out at sea
- Jana (2003) – stayed out at sea
- Jane

- 1950† – a catastrophic and deadly tropical cyclone that left significant effects to Japan during the 1950.
- 1970 – a powerful category 4 tropical cyclone affected Madagascar.
- 1979 – stayed out at sea.
- 1983† – a powerful category 4 tropical cyclone made landfall Western Australia.
- 1992 – remained over open waters

- Janet

- 1955† – Category 5 hurricane that became one of the strongest Atlantic hurricanes on record; caused at least 1,000 deaths and $65.8 million (USD) in damages
- 1970 – a strong tropical cyclone, never threatened land.

- Jangmi

- 2008 – made landfall in Nan'ao, Yilan, Taiwan.
- 2014 – a weak but destructive tropical cyclone that impacted the Philippines.
- 2020 – affected South Korea.
- 2026 – a strong severe tropical storm that affected in the Japan.

- Janice

- 1958 – affected Cuba and the Bahamas as a tropical storm.
- 1971 – did not affect land.

- Janis

- 1992 – an early-season typhoon that struck Japan.
- 1995 – a weak tropical storm that made landfall Eastern China and Korea Peninsula.

- Jasmine

- 2012† – a powerful and long-lived Category 4 tropical cyclone that moved into and peaked within the South Pacific basin in February it affected several countries, especially Vanuatu and Tonga.
- 2022 – a strong tropical storm that impacted Mozambique and Madagascar.

- Jason (1987)† – a Category 3 severe tropical cyclone that made landfall Queensland and Northern Territory.
- Jasper

- 2009 – a Category 2 tropical cyclone that had little impact on New Caledonia.
- 2023† – a long-lived and powerful Category 5 severe tropical cyclone which impacted the Solomon Islands and Far North Queensland with torrential rain.

- Javier

- 1980 – stayed in the open ocean.
- 1986 – produced high waves in southern California.
- 1992 – dissipated south of Hawaii.
- 1997 – made landfall on south-western Mexico, dissipated shortly after moving ashore.
- 2004 – made landfall on Baja California; later produced rainfall across the southwest United States.
- 2016 – struck Baja California, degenerated into a remnant low shortly after passing offshore.
- 2022 – formed near Baja California but did not make landfall, dissipated shortly after.

- Jawad (2021) – a weak cyclonic storm that made landfalls in Odisha, West Bengal and Andhra Pradesh.
- Jaya (2007) – made landfall in Madagascar as a tropical cyclone.
- Jean

- 1945 – a strong typhoon affected Taiwan and Eastern China.
- 1947 – a strong typhoon made landfall Philippines.
- 1956 – a powerful category 4 typhoon made landfall Northern Philippines.
- 1960 – did not make landfall.
- 1962 – a category 2 typhoon made landfall Philippines.
- 1965 – a Category 5 typhoon brought heavy winds to Southern Japan.
- 1968 – remained over open waters.
- 1971 – a strong typhoon affected Philippines, South China and Vietnam.
- 1973 – remained over open waters.
- 1974 – a weak tropical storm affected Eastern China.
- 1977 – remained over open waters.

- Jeana

- 1990 – a weak tropical depression that made landfall Philippines and Vietnam.
- 1993 – remained over open waters.

- Jeanne

- 1952 – affected Japan while paralleling the coast.
- 1980 – one of only four hurricanes to not make landfall in the Gulf of Mexico.
- 1998 – brushed through Cape Verde as a hurricane and made landfall in Spain.
- 2004† – a Category 3 hurricane that affected Haiti, Puerto Rico and Florida; caused over 3,000 deaths and $7.94 billion in damages.

- Jebi

- 2013 – struck the Philippines, mainland China and Vietnam.
- 2018 – a strong Category 5 typhoon that made landfall in west Japan, becoming the third costliest typhoon in nominal terms.
- 2024† – a minimal typhoon passed off the coast of Japan.

- Jeff

- 1981 – a weak tropical storm, that never affected land.
- 1985 – a Category 1 typhoon, that made landfall Eastern China.
- 1988 – remained over open waters.

- Jelawat

- 2000 – made landfall at southern Shanghai and rapidly weakened.
- 2006 – impact China.
- 2012 – the most intense tropical cyclone of the 2012 Pacific typhoon season in terms of ten-minute maximum sustained winds, tied with Typhoon Sanba.
- 2018 – a powerful typhoon that affected the Caroline Islands.
- 2023 – a weak tropical storm that traversed through Mindanao.

- Jenna (2026) – a Category 3 severe tropical cyclone that stayed out to sea.
- Jennifer

- 1963 – a weak tropical storm that hit Southern California.
- 1969 – a Category 1 Pacific hurricane that struck the state of Mazatlán in October 1969.
- 1973 – a weak tropical storm that hit Mexico and did not cause significant damage.

- Jenny

- 1961 – did not affect land.
- 1962 – struck Reunion; killed 36.
- 1969 – weak tropical storm that affected Western Cuba and Florida.
- 1974 – a Category 2 tropical cyclone that struck northern Western Australia.
- 2015 – a powerful typhoon which struck the Ryukyu Islands, Taiwan, and Fujian.
- 2019 – made landfall in the Philippines and later in Vietnam.
- 2023 – a Category 4 typhoon that made landfall on the southern tip of Taiwan and affected Hong Kong.

- Jerry

- 1989 – crossed over the Yucatán Peninsula and also struck Texas, killing three and causing $70 million in damages.
- 1995 – formed between Florida and the Bahamas, caused six deaths and $26.5 million in damages in the southeast United States.
- 2001 – passed south of Barbados and dissipated in the Caribbean Sea.
- 2007 – formed in the northern central Atlantic and stayed far from land.
- 2013 – formed and remained far from land.
- 2019 – a Category 2 hurricane that stayed out to sea.
- 2025 – passed near the Lesser Antilles that affected Guadeloupe with heavy rainfall.

- Jeruto (2020) – weak tropical storm that mostly stayed out at sea.
- Jewel

- 1967 – a Category 1 hurricane mostly stayed at sea.
- 1971 – tropical storm formed off the coast of Mexico after gradually moving away from it.
- 1975 – mostly stayed at sea.

- Jig

- 1950 – a major hurricane that did not affect land.
- 1951 – did not affect land.

- Jim

- 1984 – a Category 3 severe tropical cyclone a cross the Cape York Peninsula that made landfall Northern Territory.
- 2006 – a Category 3 severe tropical cyclone that affected New Caledonia and Vanuatu.

- Jimena

- 1979 – formed at a very low latitude, remained at sea.
- 1985 — remained at sea.
- 1991 — remained at sea.
- 1997 — formed fairly far east, out in the Pacific Ocean.
- 2003 — remained at sea for its entire lifetime. Entered the Central Pacific days after forming, crossed the International Dateline and dissipated there.
- 2009 — tied for strongest hurricane to strike the Baja California Peninsula, also a strong Category 4 hurricane.
- 2015 — a long-lasting, strong Category 4 hurricane.
- 2021 – formed in the open ocean.

- Joalane (2015) – stayed out at sea.
- Joan

- 1951 – typhoon that did not affect land.
- 1955 – did not affect land.
- 1959 – Category 5 typhoon that struck Taiwan, becoming one of the strongest to affect Taiwan.
- 1962 – affected South Korea as a tropical storm.
- 1964 – hit Vietnam as a typhoon, killed 7,000 people.
- 1965 – made landfall in Western Australia.
- 1967 – long-lived storm that did not affect land.
- 1970 – Category 5 typhoon that made landfall in southeastern Luzon as a Category 1 and eastern Hainan Island as a Category 5.
- 1973 – approached Taiwan then struck China.
- 1975† – a Category 5 severe tropical cyclone that made landfall in Western Australia.
- 1976 – typhoon that did not affect land
- 1988† – passed over the Guajira Peninsula in northern Colombia and northwestern Venezuela made landfall in Nicaragua; after crossing Central America into the Pacific, the cyclone was renamed Tropical Storm Miriam.
- 1997 – Category 5 typhoon that co-existed with Typhoon Ivan with both being Category 5 typhoons simultaneously.

- Joaninha (2019) – affected the island Rodrigues.
- Joanne

- 1961 – mostly stayed at sea.
- 1968 – mostly stayed at sea.
- 1972 – one of four tropical cyclones to bring gale-force winds to the Southwestern United States in the 20th century.
- 1976 – mostly stayed at sea.

- Joaquin (2015)† – Category 4 hurricane that devastated several districts in The Bahamas; affected Turks and Caicos Islands, Bermuda, and parts of the Greater Antilles.
- Jobo (2021) – a tropical cyclone that made an exit on the coast of Tanzania where 22 people died
- Joe

- 1980 – a Category 3 typhoon that affected the Philippines, China, and Vietnam.
- 1983 – a strong tropical storm that affected Philippines and South China.
- 1986 – a Category 3 typhoon that minimal affected Philippines.

- Joel

- 1991 – a weak tropical storm that affected southern China.
- 1994 – a weak tropical storm that made landfall Northern Vietnam.
- 2010 – passed close to the southern coast of Madagascar.

- John

- 1978 – did not affect land.
- 1982 – did not affect land.
- 1988 – affected the southern tip of Baja California.
- 1994 – second longest-lasting tropical cyclone on record; crossed the International Date Line (180°) to the Western Pacific.
- 1999† – severe tropical cyclone made landfall in Western Australia.
- 2000 – did not affect land.
- 2006 – a Category 4 hurricane that made landfall in Baja California.
- 2012 – a short-lived storm that did not affect land.
- 2018 – affected Baja California without making landfall.
- 2024† – a Category 3 hurricane that impacted Guerrero and Oaxaca, re-formed off the Pacific coast of Mexico as a Category 1 hurricane

- Jokwe (2008) – first tropical cyclone to make landfall in Mozambique since Cyclone Favio; caused 16 deaths and $8 million (2008 USD) in damages.
- Jolina

- 2001 – a tropical depression that was only recognized by PAGASA.
- 2005 – a powerful typhoon that struck southwestern Japan in September 2005.
- 2009 – tropical storm that brought heavy rainfall to South China.
- 2013 – a tropical cyclone that caused loss of life and moderate damage across Vietnam and South China in July 2013.
- 2017 – a strong tropical storm that impacted South China during late August 2017.
- 2021† – a strong tropical cyclone that impacted the central Philippines and Vietnam.
- 2026 – a European windstorm which became a Mediterranean tropical-like cyclone while affecting Spain and Libya; also known as Storm Samuel.

- Jongdari

- 2018 – strong long-lived and erratic tropical cyclone that impacted Japan and East China.
- 2024 – a weak tropical storm that affected Ryukyu Islands and the Korean peninsula.

- Joni

- 1992† – a damaging tropical cyclone that impacted the island nations of Tuvalu and Fiji.
- 2009 – a small and compact system only minimal impact was reported in the Southern Cook Islands while some heavy rainfall was reported in Mangaia.
- 2012 – remained over the open ocean.

- Jose

- 1964 – a weak tropical storm that had minor effects on land.
- 1981 – short-lived and weak storm that did not impact land.
- 1999 – affected the Leeward Islands; killed three and caused light damage.
- 2005 – made landfall in Mexico as a weak storm.
- 2011 – tropical storm that formed south-southwest of Bermuda; did not impact land.
- 2014† – a Category 5 super typhoon that enhanced monsoonal rains in the Philippines but remained off-shore and later made landfall on Shikoku, Japan, as a minimal typhoon.
- 2017 – long-lived Category 4 hurricane that affected the Leeward Islands, which was devastated two days earlier by Hurricane Irma; also affected the Mid-Atlantic and New England as a tropical storm.
- 2023 – strong but small tropical storm that was later absorbed by Hurricane Franklin.

- Josephine

- 1970 – a Category 5 tropical cyclone that made landfall in Madagascar and was initially named Jane.
- 1984 – largely stayed out at sea, but affected the Mid-Atlantic.
- 1990 – stayed out at sea causing no impacts to land.
- 1996 – tropical storm that made landfall in Florida, causing $130 million in damages.
- 2002 – remained at sea as a short-lived storm.
- 2008 – remained at sea.
- 2020 – earliest tenth named storm on record, dissipated north of the Lesser Antilles without affecting land.
- 2026 – a strong short-lived subtropical storm that remained at sea.

- Joshua (2021) – mostly stayed out at sea.
- Josie

- 1997 – a strong tropical cyclone affected Madagascar.
- 2018 (March)† – moved near Tonga and claimed the lives of 4 people, with another person remaining missing.
- 2018 (July) – short-lived tropical depression which brought significant flooding to parts of the Philippines.
- 2022 – an intense typhoon recently became the strongest tropical cyclone of 2022, currently threatening Japan.
- 2026 – a short lived tropical storm that is unrecognized by the Joint Typhoon Warning Center.

- Jova

- 1981 – a Category 1 Pacific hurricane that affected Hawaii.
- 1987 – did not affect land.
- 1993 – a powerful Category 4 hurricane that caused heavy rainfall in western Mexico.
- 2005 – passed near Hawaii but did not affect land.
- 2011 – a Category 3 hurricane, made landfall in Mexico as a Category 2 hurricane
- 2017 – did not affect land.
- 2023 – a Category 5 hurricane that stayed in the open ocean, one of the fastest-intensifying Pacific hurricanes on record.

- Joy

- 1966 – a strong tropical cyclone.
- 1990† – struck Australia in late 1990, causing the third highest floods on record in Rockhampton, Queensland.
- 1996 – a strong tropical storm that did not affect land areas.

- Joyce

- 1966 – stayed at sea.
- 1970 – did not affect land.
- 1974 – a Category 1 hurricane that did not affect land areas.
- 2000 – a Category 1 hurricane that approached the Windward Islands.
- 2012 – remained over the open.
- 2017 – a Category 2 tropical cyclone that caused heavy rainfall over much of Western Australia.
- 2018 – did not affect land.
- 2024 – a weak tropical storm that did not affect land.

- Juan

- 1985 – struck the Gulf Coast of the United States, killing 12 and causing $3.2 billion (2005USD) in damages.
- 2002 – monitored by the JMA; killed 14 people.
- 2003† – Category 2 hurricane that affected the Canadian provinces of Nova Scotia and Prince Edward Island; caused 8 deaths and $200 million in damages.
- 2006 – strong Category 5-equivalent typhoon that made landfall in Taiwan and the People's Republic of China, killing 441 and causing $1.5 billion in damages.
- 2010 † – powerful Category 5 typhoon that struck Luzon; causing ₱15 billion in damages.
- 2024 – affected the portions of Portugal and Spain.

- Juaning

- 2003 – brought significant rainfall to Taiwan before alleviating drought conditions in mainland China in August 2003.
- 2007 – a short-lived tropical storm that had minor effects on land.
- 2011† – a strong tropical storm which made a total of four landfalls in Southeast Asia, killing more than 100 people and causing damage estimated at US$126 million.

- Juba (2004) – one of three May cyclones to exist in the South-west Indian Ocean, along with Cyclones Kesiny (2002) and Manou (2003).
- Jude (2025) – a Category 1 tropical cyclone that made landfall in Madagascar and Mozambique.
- Judith

- 1949 – brushed Okinawa and struck western Kyushu.
- 1959 – affected the western Caribbean and made landfall in Florida as a tropical storm.
- 1966 – remained over the open southern Indian Ocean.
- 1966 – affected the Windward Islands as a depression.

- Judy

- 1953 – skirted the Philippines and Taiwan, then struck Kyushu, Japan.
- 1957 – Category 4 super typhoon, passed eastern Japan, well offshore.
- 1960 – did not affect land.
- 1963 – Category 5-equivalent super typhoon, did not affect land.
- 1965 (January) – a tropical cyclone that affected Queensland.
- 1965 (February) – east of Madagascar.
- 1966 – affected primarily Taiwan.
- 1968 – did not affect land.
- 1970 – remained over the open.
- 1971 – meandered off the coast of East Malaysia.
- 1974 – formed in the South China Sea.
- 1978 – did not affect land.
- 1979 – Category 4 super typhoon, struck China and South Korea.
- 1982 – hit southeastern Japan.
- 1986 – drifted east of the Philippines, never made landfall.
- 1989 – made landfall on Kyushu, Japan, and in South Korea.
- 2004 – remained over the open South Pacific.
- 2023† – a Category 4 severe tropical cyclone that made landfall in the Vanuatu.

- Julia

- 2010 – easternmost Category 4 hurricane on record; caused no impacts to land areas.
- 2012 – brought heavy flooding and hurricane conditions to parts of Europe, the Mediterranean region and North Africa
- 2016 – caused minor damage to the East Coast of the United States.
- 2022 – Category 1 hurricane that made landfall in Nicaragua, crossed over intact into the eastern Pacific Ocean.

- Julian

- 2004 – a weak tropical storm has minor impact on Philippines and South China.
- 2008 – a storm which made landfall on south China
- 2012 – a powerful storm that struck the Korean Peninsula.
- 2016 – a long-lived tropical cyclone that struck Central Vietnam.
- 2020 – a deadly, damaging and powerful tropical cyclone that struck the Ryukyu Islands and the Korean Peninsula.
- 2021 – short-lived tropical storm that formed in the central subtropical Atlantic and stayed at sea.
- 2024† – a powerful tropical cyclone that struck the Philippines and the made landfall in Taiwan.

- Julie (1963) – passed east of Rodrigues.
- Juliet

- 1978 – affected the Greater Antilles.
- 2005 – crossed over 90°E as Adeline, stayed out at sea.

- Juliette

- 1973 – a Category 2 tropical cyclone that made landfall Fiji as tropical depression.
- 1983 – stayed out at sea.
- 1989 – stayed out at sea.
- 1995 – affected Baja California but never made landfall.
- 2001 – made landfall in Baja California as a tropical storm.
- 2007 – never affected landmass.
- 2013 – paralleled the Baja California peninsula.
- 2019 – stayed out at sea.
- 2025 – a strong tropical storm that stayed out to sea

- Julio

- 1984 – did not impact land.
- 1990 – stayed out at sea.
- 2002 – made landfall along the southwestern coast of Mexico.
- 2008 – made landfall in the southern tip of Baja California Sur.
- 2014 – stayed out at sea.
- 2020 – a small and weak storm that formed from the remnants of Hurricane Nana remained at sea.
- 2026 – short-lived and weak storm that stayed at sea.

- Julita (1994) – a short-lived tropical depression near Madagascar.
- Juluka (2026) – a subtropical storm, that never affected land.
- June

- 1954 – a large, strong and devastating typhoon that severely impacted the west and central areas of mainland Japan, causing scores of deaths and heavy devastation.
- 1958 – crossed into the Central Pacific basin briefly.
- 1961 –a Category 2 typhoon that hit southeastern Taiwan.
- 1964 – a weak tropical storm that hit the northern part of the Philippines and southern China.
- 1966 – a category 2 typhoon that remained at sea.
- 1969 – a category 3 typhoon that remained at sea.
- 1972 – formed in the Central Pacific.
- 1975 – a powerful Category 5 typhoon that never made landfall but passed 230 miles west of Guam, causing severe flooding.
- 1977 – a Category 3 severe tropical cyclone that impact Vanuatu and New Caledonia.
- 1981 – a Category 1 typhoon that hit Taiwan passed off the coast of China and South Korea and hit Japan as a depression.
- 1984 – the first of two tropical cyclones to affect the Philippines in a one-week time span in August 1984.
- 1986 – stayed out at sea.
- 1987 – a weak tropical storm that remained at sea.
- 1997 – a Category 2 tropical cyclone caused severe flooding produced by the in Fiji left roughly $500,000 in damages.
- 2014 – a weak tropical cyclone caused at least one fatality in New Caledonia.

- Justin (1997)† – an erratic and deadly tropical cyclone which severely affected Australia and Papua New Guinea in March 1997.
- Justine (1982) – the last of the four tropical cyclones to affect Madagascar in the 1981–82 season.

== See also ==
- Tropical cyclone
- Tropical cyclone naming
- European windstorm names
- Atlantic hurricane season
- List of Pacific hurricane seasons
- South Atlantic tropical cyclone
