= 1950 in Japan =

- Decades: 1930s; 1940s; 1950s; 1960s; 1970s
- See also: Other events of 1950; History of Japan • Timeline • Years

== Incumbents ==
- Emperor: Hirohito
- Prime Minister: Shigeru Yoshida
- Chief Cabinet Secretary: Kaneshichi Masuda until May 6, Katsuo Okazaki
- Chief Justice of the Supreme Court: Tadahiko Mibuchi until March 2, Kōtarō Tanaka from March 3
- President of the House of Representatives: Kijūrō Shidehara
- President of the House of Councillors: Naotake Satō

=== Governors ===
- Aichi Prefecture: Hideo Aoyagi
- Akita Prefecture: Kosaku Hasuike
- Aomori Prefecture: Bunji Tsushima
- Chiba Prefecture: Tamenosuke Kawaguchi (until 25 October); Hitoshi Shibata (starting 15 December)
- Ehime Prefecture: Juushin Aoki
- Fukui Prefecture: Harukazu Obata
- Fukuoka Prefecture: Katsuji Sugimoto
- Fukushima Prefecture: Sakuma Ootake (starting 28 January)
- Gifu Prefecture: Kamon Muto
- Gunma Prefecture: Yoshio Iyoku
- Hiroshima Prefecture:
  - until 29 November: Tsunei Kusunose
  - 29 November-25 December: Tetsuo Wakuda
  - starting 25 December: vacant
- Hokkaido Prefecture: Toshifumi Tanaka
- Hyogo Prefecture: Yukio Kishida
- Ibaraki Prefecture: Yoji Tomosue
- Ishikawa Prefecture: Wakio Shibano
- Iwate Prefecture: Kenkichi Kokubun
- Kagawa Prefecture: Keikichi Masuhara (until 25 July); Masanori Kaneko (starting 11 September)
- Kagoshima Prefecture: Kaku Shigenari
- Kanagawa Prefecture: Iwataro Uchiyama
- Kochi Prefecture: Wakaji Kawamura
- Kumamoto Prefecture: Saburō Sakurai
- Kyoto Prefecture: Atsushi Kimura (until 2 April); Torazō Ninagawa (starting 20 April)
- Mie Prefecture: Masaru Aoki
- Miyagi Prefecture: Kazuji Sasaki
- Miyazaki Prefecture: Tadao Annaka
- Nagano Prefecture: Torao Hayashi
- Nagasaki Prefecture: Sōjirō Sugiyama
- Nara Prefecture: Mansaku Nomura
- Niigata Prefecture: Shohei Okada
- Oita Prefecture: Tokuju Hosoda
- Okayama Prefecture: Hirokichi Nishioka
- Osaka Prefecture: Bunzō Akama
- Saga Prefecture: Gen'ichi Okimori
- Saitama Prefecture: Yuuichi Oosawa
- Shiga Prefecture: Iwakichi Hattori
- Shiname Prefecture: Fujiro Hara
- Shizuoka Prefecture: Takeji Kobayashi
- Tochigi Prefecture: Juukichi Kodaira
- Tokushima Prefecture: Goro Abe
- Tokyo Prefecture: Seiichirō Yasui
- Tottori Prefecture: Aiji Nishio
- Toyama Prefecture: Kunitake Takatsuji
- Wakayama Prefecture: Shinji Ono
- Yamagata Prefecture: Michio Murayama
- Yamaguchi Prefecture: Tatsuo Tanaka
- Yamanashi Prefecture: Katsuyasu Yoshie

== Events ==
- January 1: The old practice of advancing one's age every New Year's Day (regardless of one's date of birth) is replaced by the western style of advancing one's age on each anniversary of one's date of birth. Under the old system, someone born on November 1, for example, would turn one on January 1, two months later.
- February 11: According to Japan National Police Agency official confirmed report, a regular route bus plunge into ravine in Hōtaku District, Kumamoto Prefecture, (now Kumamoto City), Kyushu Island, 22 persons lost their lives, 31 persons were hurt.
- July 5: Bandaiya, later Bandai Namco Holdings founded in Asakusa, Tokyo.
- July 7: Kinkaku-ji in Kyoto is burned to the ground by a 22-year-old novice monk.
- September 4: Typhoon Jane, tidal wave and flash flood hit around Osaka Bay, official death toll was 539 persons, with 26,062 persons were wounded, according to Japanese government official confirmed report.
- September 14: Typhoon Kezia, tidal wave hit around Island Sea of Seto, with lost Kintai Bridge and Miyajima Torii gate. According to Japan Fire and Disaster Management Agency official confirmed report, 49 persons were fatalities, 35 persons were hurt.
- November 7: According to JNPA official confirmed report, a regular route bus plunge into Monobe River, Mirabu, (now Kami, Kochi), Shikoku Island, 34 persons were human fatalities and 29 persons were wounded.
- December 12: Hayato Ikeda, future Prime Minister of Japan, remarks in the National Diet that "the poor should eat barley".
- December 20: A dormitory of Okayama Prfectural Deaf School fire, according to JFDMA official announced, 16 persons lost their lives in Okayama City.
- Undated:
  - Tenshi Junior College is founded in Sapporo.

== Births ==
- January 16 – Damo Suzuki, musician (d. 2024)
- February 20 – Ken Shimura, television performer and actor (d. 2020)
- March 31 – Yoshifumi Kondō, animator (d. 1998)
- April 5 – Toshiko Fujita, voice actress (d. 2018)
- April 21 – Tatsumi Kimishima, businessman
- April 26 – Junko Ohashi, singer (d. 2023)
- August 2 – Ken Kutaragi, businessman
- August 10 – Tetsuo Gotō, voice actor (d. 2018)
- August 29 – Aki Yashiro, singer (d. 2023)
- September 8 – Naoki Tatsuta, voice actor
- September 14 – Masami Kuwashima, race car driver
- September 27 – Cary-Hiroyuki Tagawa, actor
- October 2 – Tetsuo Gotō, politician (d. 2018)
- October 12 – Kaga Takeshi, actor
- October 16 – Yasunori Oshima, former professional baseball player and coach (d. 2021)
- November 12 – Hideyuki Tanaka, voice actor and narrator
- December 6 – Joe Hisaishi, composer and pianist

== Deaths ==
- January 17 – Seiichi Hatano, philosopher
- July 23 – Shigenori Tōgō
- November 3 – Kuniaki Koiso, Prime minister

== See also ==
- List of Japanese films of 1950
