= Rocball =

Team sport

Rocball or roccball is a non-contact team net game derivative of volleyball and basketball with inspiration from the Mesoamerican ballgame. Rocball has existed since 1979 and was founded by James Feger, a Physical Education teacher at Marianas High School located in the Commonwealth of the Northern Mariana Islands.

== Rules of the sport ==
Rocball is played on a rectangular court bisected by an overhead net with goals located behind each end of the court. (Note: Any volleyball court can be converted into a Rocball arena by simply placing two goalposts at two sides.)

The offensive team has the scoring advantage because of service and court points. However, either team has the opportunity to score from one to three points during any one play; under certain conditions, the defensive team can score one point plays, the server can score different types of two point plays, the goalies of either team can score two points, any player from either team can score a three-point goal, and there are different ways to win a set of play.

It is the first team net sport to implement offensive and defensive scoring, multiple point plays, plays in which a team can lose a point, and the first team net sport to include the combination of kicking and hitting play action.

== Rocball jargon ==
- Court Point - the offensive team scores a point.
- Bogey Point - The offensive team loses a point.
- Jam - the defensive team scores a point.
- Face - the offensive or defensive team scores one point.
- Xunk - the defensive team loses two points.
- Ace - the offensive team scores two points.
- Kee - the offensive or defensive team scores two points
- Goal - a three-point play in which a team can add points to their own score or reduce their opponent's score.
- Juice-Out - the manner in which a team can win a game in four sets.
- O-Kon - Rocball overtime if neither team can Juice-Out in four sets.
- Blow-Out/Skunk/Scratch/Match - terms used to describe how teams win the different types of sets in Rocball

== Rocball in the Pacific ==
Rocball is popular on the island of Saipan, in the Northern Mariana Islands. It is also played in Asian countries such as Pakistan, India, Sri Lanka, and Nepal.
