= Marianas High School =

High school in Saipan, Northern Mariana Islands, United States

Location
- Beach Road, Susupe, Saipan, Northern Mariana Islands; 15°9′39″N 145°42′29″E

Information
- Type: Public Secondary
- Motto: Team Effort Towards Excellence
- Established: 1969; 57 years ago
- Principal: Melanie Sablan Rdiall
- Faculty: 60
- Grades: 9 - 12
- Enrollment: 1,500
- Colors: Royal blue and gold
- Mascot: Dolphin
- Website: marianashighschool.com

Marianas High School (MHS) is a public four-year high school located in Susupe, Saipan in the Commonwealth of the Northern Mariana Islands (CNMI). It is one of six high schools operated by the CNMI Public School System and the largest of the three public high schools serving the island of Saipan.

== History ==
Marianas High School opened in the fall of 1969, making it the second oldest of the five high schools on Saipan, behind Mount Caramel School. MHS replaced the high school program at Hopwood Junior High School, which closed in 1968 when Typhoon Jean occurred.

In June 2011, Marianas High School announced it achieved above-average scores on 5 of the 8 Stanford Achievement Test Series (SAT 10). The overall average score placed MHS in the 51st percentile, the first time a high school in the CNMI outperformed the national average.

In 2013, five MHS students were named AP Scholars, and two were named Scholars with Honors by the CollegeBoard. In addition, three MHS students were named Gates Scholars for their outstanding academic performance. In the same year, the MHS STEM team won a National Championship for its unmanned search and rescue plane, the first national championship ever won by a U.S. territory.

In late 2015, the MHS STEM team won another National Championship led by their instructor, John D. Raulerson.

== Controversies ==
In 2008, a security guard was murdered on campus by teens stealing laptops.

== Notable alumni ==
- Miguel S. Demapan, late Chief Justice of the Northern Mariana Islands Supreme Court
- Gregorio Sablan, Delegate to the United States House of Representatives (2009–present)
- Luis John Castro, Member of the Northern Mariana Islands House of Representatives (2019–present)
