= List of storms named Judy =

The name Judy has been used for 17 tropical cyclones worldwide. Thirteen were in the West Pacific Ocean, three in the South Pacific Ocean, and one in the South-West Indian Ocean.

In the West Pacific:

- Typhoon Judy (1953) – skirted the Philippines and Taiwan, then struck Kyushu, Japan
- Typhoon Judy (1957) – passed eastern Japan, well offshore
- Typhoon Judy (1960) – churned in the open ocean
- Typhoon Judy (1963) – remained out at sea
- Typhoon Judy (1966) (Deling) – affected primarily Taiwan
- Typhoon Judy (1968) (Paring) – remained over the open ocean
- Tropical Storm Judy (1971) – meandered off the coast of East Malaysia
- Tropical Storm Judy (1974) (Kading) – formed in the South China Sea
- Typhoon Judy (1978) – did not impact land
- Typhoon Judy (1979) (Neneng) – struck China and South Korea
- Typhoon Judy (1982) (Susang) – hit southeastern Japan
- Typhoon Judy (1986) (T8601, 01W, Akang) – drifted east of the Philippines, never made landfall
- Typhoon Judy (1989) – made landfall on Kyushu, Japan, and in South Korea

In the South Pacific:

- Cyclone Judy (1989) – stayed at sea
- Cyclone Judy (2004) – remained over the open ocean
- Cyclone Judy (2023) – made landfall in Vanuatu

In the South-West Indian:

- Tropical Storm Judy (1965) – existed east of Madagascar

== See also ==
- Cyclone Jude (2025) – a South-West Indian Ocean tropical cyclone with a similar name
