= Typhoon Ken (1982) =

Pacific typhoon in 1982

Typhoon Ken (Tering)
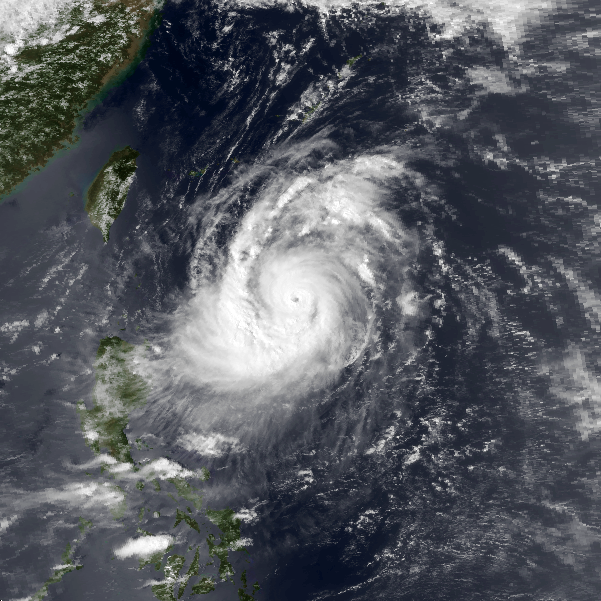
- Ken shortly before reaching peak intensity on September 18

Meteorological history
- Formed: September 16, 1982
- Dissipated: September 25, 1982

Very strong typhoon
- 10-minute sustained (JMA)
- Highest winds: 175 km/h (110 mph)
- Lowest pressure: 940 hPa (mbar); 27.76 inHg

Category 3-equivalent typhoon
- 1-minute sustained (SSHWS/JTWC)
- Highest winds: 205 km/h (125 mph)
- Lowest pressure: 936 hPa (mbar); 27.64 inHg

Overall effects
- Fatalities: 5 total
- Injuries: 18
- Damage: $154,000 (1982 USD)
- Areas affected: Japan
- IBTrACS
- Part of the 1982 Pacific typhoon season

Typhoon Ken, known in the Philippines as Typhoon Tering, was the fourth typhoon to strike Japan during the 1982 Pacific typhoon season. Forming along the western end of the monsoon trough in the Philippine Sea, the system had organized into a tropical depression on September 16, and by that night a tropical storm. As a compact system, rapid intensification continued, with Ken becoming a typhoon on the evening of September 17 and a major typhoon on September 18. The cyclone up to this point had a history of progressing slowly west-northwest, but Ken eventually stalled on September 20 and became a larger cyclone. As a mid-latitude trough to its north deepened, Ken took off to the northeast towards Okinawa. Ken made landfall upon Shikoku early on September 25, and moved onward into the Sea of Japan where it evolved into an extratropical cyclone. Five people were killed while 18 others were hurt. A total of 114 mudslides were reported, resulted in over 2,000 homes flooded. Additionally, 12 homes were damaged or destroyed. Seventy-four flights were cancelled as well.

== Meteorological history ==
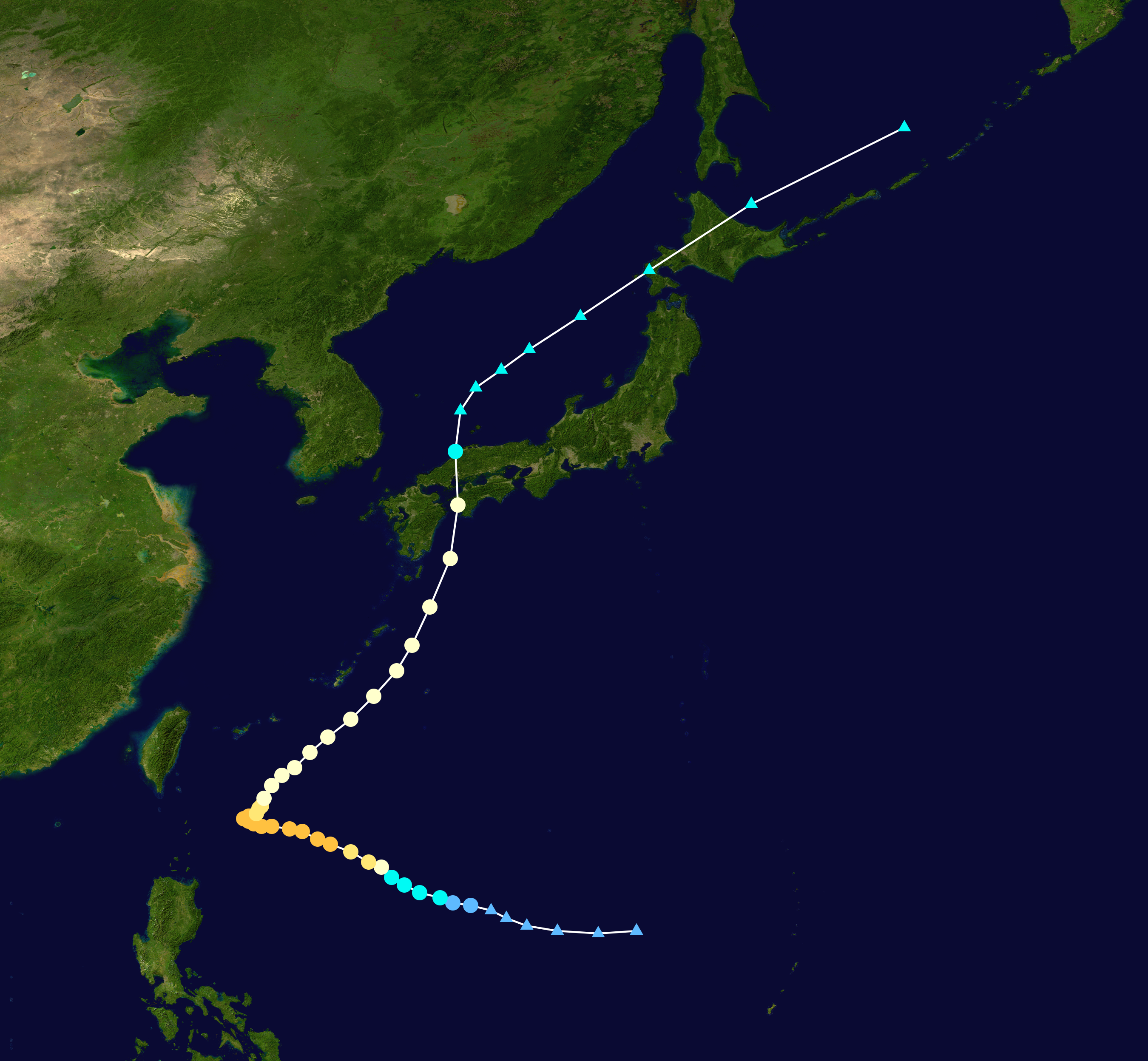
Map plotting the storm's track and intensity, according to the Saffir–Simpson scale Map key Saffir–Simpson scale Tropical depression (≤38 mph, ≤62 km/h) Tropical storm (39–73 mph, 63–118 km/h) Category 1 (74–95 mph, 119–153 km/h) Category 2 (96–110 mph, 154–177 km/h) Category 3 (111–129 mph, 178–208 km/h) Category 4 (130–156 mph, 209–251 km/h) Category 5 (≥157 mph, ≥252 km/h) Unknown Storm type Tropical cyclone Subtropical cyclone Extratropical cyclone, remnant low, tropical disturbance, or monsoon depression

During mid-September, a monsoon trough was present in the Philippine Sea. On September 14, a persistent area disturbance weather was first visible on satellite imagery. On September 15, the Japan Meteorological Agency (JMA) started to monitor the system. (Note: The Japan Meteorological Agency is the official Regional Specialized Meteorological Center for the western Pacific Ocean.) The next day, a Hurricane Hunter aircraft reported a closed atmospheric circulation. Based on this, the Joint Typhoon Warning Center (JTWC) upgraded the storm into a tropical depression, without issuing a Tropical Cyclone Formation Alert (TCFA). Six hours later, the storm was upgraded into a tropical storm. Around this time, the JMA followed suit and upgraded the system into a tropical storm. Initially, Ken was expected by the JTWC to move west and pass near Luzon, but this did not occur. At 0600 UTC on September 17, Ken was upgraded into a severe tropical storm by the JTWC and the JMA. That evening, Ken was upgraded to typhoon status by both the JTWC and the JMA when the hunters recorded a pressure of 976 mbar (28.8 inHg). Ken continued to gain strength; at 1800 UTC on September 18, the Hurricane Hunter aircraft reported winds of 185 km/h (115 mph). This wind speed is equivalent to a low-end Category 3 typhoon on the Saffir–Simpson hurricane wind scale (SSHWS). Several hours later, the JTWC reported that Ken attained peak intensity of 200 km/h (125 mph) while centered about 800 km (495 mi) east-southeast of Taiwan.

The typhoon moved west-northwest at a slower rate than expected, but on September 19, Typhoon Ken, a subtropical ridge moved west-southwest, moving into south China and the South China Sea. As such, many tropical cyclone forecast models showed Ken turning north-northeast, but Ken began to stall on September 20 instead. Around this time, the JMA estimated peak wind speeds of 110 mph (175 km/h) and a peak pressure of 940 mbar (28 inHg). Initially, Ken was small, but around this time the storm began to grow in size. The cause of the structural change is unknown, but it is possible that some dry air got introduced into the storm's circulation, which also caused the eye to collapse and the storm to weaken.

By September 21, Ken began to move erratically due to a deepening trough that was centered north of Typhoon Ken before taking off in the general direction of Japan. Weakening ensued thereafter due to increased wind shear. By September 23, the JWC reported that winds had diminished below Category 2-equaivlent strength on the SSHWS while the JMA reported winds of 130 km/h (80 mph). At this time, Ken was located around 650 km (405 mi) south of Tokyo. By the next day, however, this weakening trend had leveled off; data from the JMA suggests that the storm did not weaken further until September 25. After according to the JTWC, maintain winds of 135 km/h (85 mph) during September 24, the typhoon weakened slightly. Ken made landfall near Shikoku early on September 25 with winds of 130 km/h (80 mph), and after weakening a little according to the JTWC, Ken passed over Honshu. That day, the system moved into the Sea of Japan, where it transitioned into an extratropical cyclone while producing winds just below typhoon-force. Despite this, the JMA kept an eye on the system for two more days.

== Impact and aftermath ==
Because Ken posed a threat to shipping lanes, a tropical cyclone warning was issued for shipping lanes for a span of 66 hours, lasting from 0900 UTC September 19 until 0300 UTC September 22. Upon making landfall in Japan, Ken became the fourth storm to strike the nation during the season. Ken was responsible for strong winds, including a 90 km/h (56 mph) wind speed on Honshu. Additionally, wind gusts of 221 km/h (137 mph) were measured on Shikoku. Torrential rains were also recorded; a peak rainfall total was measured at 500 mm (20 in) in Funato, which also sustained the highest hourly rainfall total of 79.0 mm (3.11 in). In Uwajima on the island Shikoku (the smallest of the four main Japanese islands), a peak six-hour total of 220 mm (8.7 in) was recorded. Additionally, a daily rainfall peak of 280 mm (11 in) was measured at Kadena. Somewhere in Shikoku, 470 mm (19 in) of rain was recorded in a two-day time span.

Heavy rains resulted in 114 mudslides, which destroyed eight homes. According to Japan's police service, a total of 2,440 dwellings were flooded including over 450 in Uwajimi. Four homes were also damaged in Shikoku. Two minor bridges were washed away due to flooding rivers. Airlines cancelled 74 flights and the Japan National Railways halted 17 trains on the southernmost main island of Kyushu. Total damages for the storm are ¥38.37 million (US$154,000). A total of five people were killed by the storm, including three on Shikoku. An elderly couple was killed in their bed while a 30-year-old man drowned in his car. In addition to these fatalities, 18 persons were hurt; five of these injuries occurred on Shikoku. Overall, the storm directly affected 21 districts of Japan.

== See also ==
- Typhoon Judy (1982)
