= List of storms named Jack =

The name Jack has been used for four tropical cyclones worldwide, two in the Western Pacific ocean, one in the South-West Indian ocean, and one in the Australian Region.

In the Western Pacific:

- Typhoon Jack (1989) (T8932, 36W) – a late-season category 4 typhoon that affected Guam
- Tropical Depression Jack (1993) (T9303, 06W) – weak system that stayed at sea

In the South-West Indian Ocean:

- Cyclone Jack (1977) – crossed over from the Australian basin but never impacted land

In the Australian Region:

- Cyclone Jack (2014) – never impacted land
