= List of storms named Jane =

The name Jane has been used for five tropical cyclones worldwide: one in the Western Pacific Ocean, three in the Australian region and one in the South-West Indian Ocean.

In the Western Pacific:

- Typhoon Jane (1950) – a Category 3-equivalent typhoon that caused 398 fatalities in Japan.

In the Australian region:

- Cyclone Jane (1979) – remained over open waters.
- Cyclone Jane (1983) – a Category 4 severe tropical cyclone that made landfall in Western Australia.
- Cyclone Jane (1992) – remained over open waters and was renamed Irna upon crossing into the South-West Indian Ocean.

In the South-West Indian Ocean:

- Cyclone Jane (1970) – a very intense tropical cyclone that affected Madagascar and was initially named Josephine.

== See also ==
- List of storms named Janet – a similar name that has been used in two tropical cyclone basins
- List of storms named June – a similar name that has been used in two tropical cyclone basins
