= List of storms named Janis =

The name Janis was used for two tropical cyclones in the Northwestern Pacific Ocean:

- Typhoon Janis (1992) – an early-season typhoon that struck Japan.
- Tropical Storm Janis (1995) – a weak tropical storm that made landfall Eastern China and Korea Peninsula.
