= Miguel S. Demapan =

American judge

Miguel Demapan

Chief Justice of the Supreme Court of the Commonwealth of the Northern Mariana Islands
- In office 1999–2011
- Appointed by: Pedro Tenorio
- Preceded by: Marty Taylor
- Succeeded by: Alexandro Castro

Associate Justice of the Northern Mariana Islands Supreme Court
- In office 1998–1999
- Appointed by: Pedro Tenorio
- Preceded by: Pedro Atalig
- Succeeded by: John Mangloña

Personal details
- Born: Miguel Sablan Demapan c. 1953 Saipan, Trust Territory of the Pacific Islands (now Northern Mariana Islands)
- Died: June 30, 2012 (aged 58–59) Saipan, Northern Mariana Islands
- Education: Seattle University (BA); Golden Gate University (MBA); Santa Clara University (JD)

Miguel Sablan Demapan (c. 1953 – June 30, 2012) was Chief Justice of the Supreme Court of the Commonwealth of the Northern Mariana Islands from 1999 to 2011.

Born on Saipan, Demapan attended Marianas High School, obtained a Bachelor of Science from the Seattle University in 1975, an MBA at Golden Gate University in 1983, and a JD from Santa Clara University in 1985.

Demapan returned to the Mariana Islands to practice business law. He was called to the judiciary in 1992 as an Associate Judge of the Commonwealth Superior Court, and in 1998 as an associate justice of the Supreme Court. He became Chief Justice in 1999 after being appointed by Governor Pedro Tenorio.

Demapan died of colon cancer on June 30, 2012, in Saipan. He was 59.

Legal offices
Preceded by Pedro Atalig	Associate Justice of the Northern Mariana Islands Supreme Court; 1998–1999	Succeeded by John Mangloña
Preceded by Marty Taylor	Chief Justice of the Northern Mariana Islands Supreme Court; 1999–2011	Succeeded by Alexandro Castro
