= List of storms named Janice =

The name Janice has been used for two tropical cyclones in the Atlantic Ocean:

- Hurricane Janice (1958) – affected Cuba and the Bahamas as a tropical storm.
- Tropical Storm Janice (1971) – did not affect land.
