= List of storms named Joe =

The name Joe has been used for three tropical cyclones in the West Pacific Ocean:

- Typhoon Joe (1980; T8008, 09W, Nitang) – a Category 3 typhoon that affected the Philippines, China, and Vietnam.
- Severe Tropical Storm Joe (1983) (T8314, 15W, Pepang) – a strong tropical storm that affected Philippines and South China.
- Typhoon Joe (1986) (T8625, 22W, Weling) – a Category 3 typhoon that minimal affected Philippines.

== See also ==
- Storm Joseph (2026) – a European windstorm with a similar name.
