= List of storms named Jig =

The name Jig has been used for two tropical cyclones in the Atlantic Ocean:

- Hurricane Jig (1950) – a major hurricane that did not affect land.
- Hurricane Jig (1951) – did not affect land.
