= List of storms named Jacob =

The name Jacob was used to name four tropical cyclones worldwide: one in the Western Pacific and three in the Australian Region.

In the Western Pacific Ocean:

- Tropical Depression Jacob (1999) (03W, Karing) – a system that was considered by Japan Meteorological Agency (JMA) as a tropical depression, despite being analyzed by the Joint Typhoon Warning Center (JTWC) as a tropical storm.

In the Australian Region:

- Cyclone Jacob (1985) – a Category 3 cyclone that paralleled the coast of Western Australia.
- Cyclone Jacob (1996) – the Kimberley and Pilbara coastal areas received heavy rains as the cyclone passed offshore.
- Cyclone Jacob (2007) – made landfall east of Port Hedland, Western Australia.
