= Tenshi Junior College =

- 天使女子短期大学
- Motto: Per Caritatem ad veritatem
- Type: Private
- Active: 1950–2002
- Academic staff: nursing food dietetics
- Location: Sapporo, Japan

Tenshi Junior College (天使女子短期大学, Tenshi Joshi Tanki Daigaku) was a junior college in Sapporo, Japan.

The institute was founded in 1950, while the predecessor of the school, a training school for nursing, was founded in 1947. Another predecessor of the school, a training school for dietitian, was founded in 1949.
