= List of storms named Jewel =

The name Jewel has been used for three tropical cyclones in the Eastern Pacific Ocean:

- Hurricane Jewel (1967)
- Tropical Storm Jewel (1971)
- Hurricane Jewel (1975)
