= List of storms named Joanne =

The name Joanne has been used for four tropical cyclones Eastern Pacific.

- Tropical Storm Joanne (1961) – a tropical storm that did not affect land
- Hurricane Joanne (1968) – a Category 1 hurricane that did not affect land
- Hurricane Joanne (1972) – a Category 2 hurricane that brought gale-force winds to the Southwestern United States
- Tropical Storm Joanne (1976) – a tropical storm that did not affect land
