= List of storms named Joel =

The names Joel and Joël have been used for three tropical cyclones worldwide: two in the West Pacific Ocean and one in the South-West Indian Ocean.

In the West Pacific:

- Tropical Storm Joel (1991) – A weak tropical storm that affected southern China.
- Tropical Storm Joel (1994) – A weak tropical storm that made landfall in Northern Vietnam.

In the South-West Indian:

- Subtropical Depression Joël (2010) – Passed close to the southern coast of Madagascar.
