= List of storms named June =

The name June has been used for one tropical cyclone in the Central Pacific Ocean and seven tropical cyclones in the Western Pacific Ocean.

In the Central Pacific:

- Tropical Storm June (1972) – brought gusty breezes and some rain to Johnston Atoll

In the Western Pacific:

- Typhoon June (1954) (T5412) – hit Japan (ja)
- Typhoon June (1958) (T5823) – briefly crossed into the Central Pacific
- Tropical Storm June (1964) (T6413, 17W, Toyang)
- Typhoon June (1969) (T6917, 20W, Pining)
- Typhoon June (1975) (T7523, 23W, Rosing) – strongest tropical cyclone on record prior to Typhoon Tip
- Typhoon June (1981) (T8105, 06W, Kuring)
- Typhoon June (1984) (T8412, 14W, Maring)

== See also ==
- List of storms named Jane – a similar name that has been used in three tropical cyclone basins
