= List of storms named Jasmine =

The name Jasmine has been used to name two tropical cyclones worldwide.

In the South-West Indian Ocean:

- Tropical Storm Jasmine (2022) – affected Mozambique and Madagascar in April, killing ten.

In the Australian region:

- Cyclone Jasmine (2012) – powerful and long-lived cyclone that moved into and peaked within the South Pacific basin in February. It affected several countries, especially Vanuatu and Tonga.

The name Jasmine was retired in the Australian region after the 2011–12 season.
