= List of storms named Jeana =

The name Jeana was used for two tropical cyclones in the West Pacific Ocean:

- Tropical Depression Jeana (1990) – made landfall in the Philippines and Vietnam.
- Tropical Storm Jeana (1993) – remained over open waters.

== See also ==
- Cyclone Jenna (2026) – an Australian region tropical cyclone with a similar name.
