= List of storms named Joy =

The name Joy, has been used for three tropical cyclones worldwide: one in the Western Pacific Ocean and two in the Australian region.

In the Western Pacific:

- Tropical Storm Joy (1996) (T9611, 12W) – a strong tropical storm that did not affect land areas.

In the Australian region:

- Cyclone Joy (1966) – a strong tropical cyclone.
- Cyclone Joy (1990) – struck Australia in late 1990, causing the third highest floods on record in Rockhampton, Queensland.

Following the 1990-91 season, the World Metetorigical Organization retired the name Joy from rotating lists due to extensive damage.
