= List of storms named Jasper =

The name Jasper has been used for two tropical cyclones in the Australian region of the Southern Hemisphere:

- Cyclone Jasper (2009) – a Category 2 tropical cyclone which had minimal impacts in New Caledonia.
- Cyclone Jasper (2023) – a long-lived and powerful Category 5 severe tropical cyclone which impacted the Solomon Islands and Far North Queensland with torrential rain.

In the wake of the 2023–24 season, the name Jasper was retired from the rotating lists of storm names in the Australian region. It was replaced with Julian for future seasons.
