= List of storms named Jeff =

The name Jeff has been used for three tropical cyclones in the Northwestern Pacific Ocean.

- Tropical Storm Jeff (1981) (T8127, 27W, Binang) – a weak tropical storm, that never affected land.
- Typhoon Jeff (1985) (T8507, 07W, Goring) – a Category 1 typhoon, that made landfall Eastern China.
- Tropical Storm Jeff (1988) (T8820, 16W, Lusing) – remained over open waters.
