= List of storms named Jackie =

The name Jackie has been used for two tropical cyclones worldwide, one in the Western Pacific Ocean and one in the South-West Indian Ocean.

In the Western Pacific Ocean:

- Typhoon Jackie (1948) – a Category 1 typhoon that made landfall in Taiwan and Eastern China.

In the South-West Indian:

- Cyclone Jackie (1967) – a cyclone that remained over open waters.
