= List of storms named Jim =

The name Jim has been used for two tropical cyclones in the Australian region of the Southern Hemisphere.

- Cyclone Jim (1984) – a Category 3 severe tropical cyclone a cross the Cape York Peninsula that made landfall Northern Territory.
- Cyclone Jim (2006) – a Category 3 severe tropical cyclone that affected New Caledonia and Vanuatu.

== See also ==
- Tropical Storm Jimmy (1997) – name only used once in the Western Pacific.
