= List of storms named Janet =

The name Janet has been used for two tropical cyclones worldwide: one in the Atlantic Ocean and one in the Australian region.

In the Atlantic:

- Hurricane Janet (1955) – a Category 5 hurricane that became one of the strongest Atlantic hurricanes on record; caused at least 1,023 deaths and $65.8 million (1955USD) in damages.

The U.S. Weather Bureau retired the name Janet from future use in the Atlantic basin after the 1955 season. After a policy change in 1969, Janet was later permanently retired. No name was selected to replace Janet.

In the Australian region:

- Cyclone Janet (1970) – a Category 2 tropical cyclone that never threatened land.

== See also ==
- List of storms named Jane – a similar name that has been used in three tropical cyclone basins
- Cyclone Jeanett (2002) – a European windstorm that affected Western Europe
