= Northern Mariana Islands Supreme Court =

Highest court in the Commonwealth of the Northern Mariana Islands

Supreme Court of the Commonwealth of the Northern Mariana Islands
- Interactive map of Supreme Court of the Commonwealth of the Northern Mariana Islands
- 15.159536°N 145.706413°E
- Established: May 2, 1989
- Jurisdiction: Commonwealth of the Northern Mariana Islands
- Location: Susupe, Saipan, Northern Mariana Islands
- Coordinates: 15.159536°N 145.706413°E
- Composition method: Appointment by governor with Senate confirmation
- Authorised by: Commonwealth Judicial Reorganization Act of 1989 (P.L. No. 6-25)
- Appeals to: Supreme Court of the United States
- Appeals from: Superior Court of the Commonwealth of the Northern Mariana Islands
- Number of positions: 3
- Website: Official website

Chief Justice
- Currently: Alexandro Castro
- Since: September 30, 2011 (acting); October 11, 2012 (sworn in)

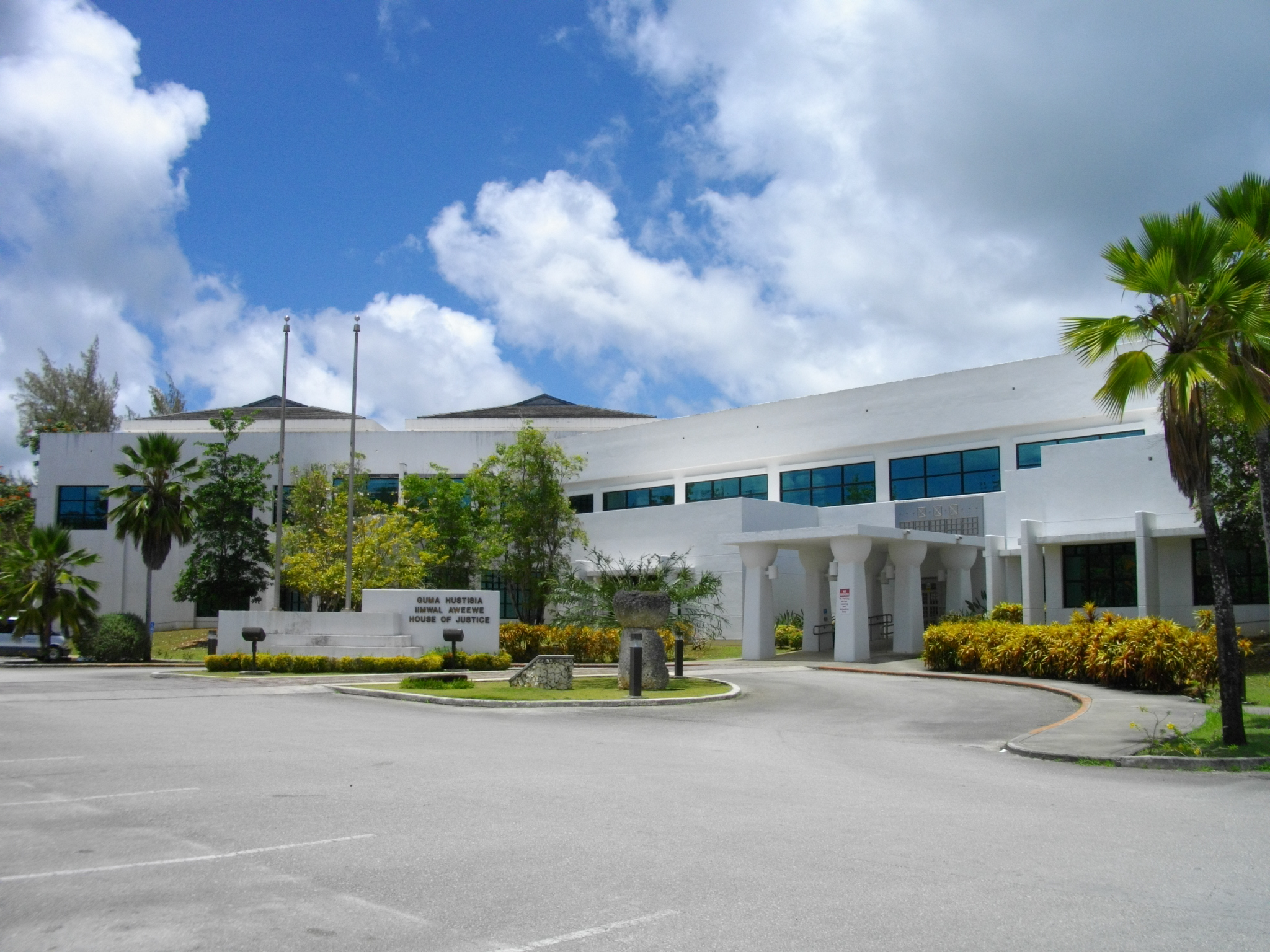
Guma’ Hustisia / Iimwal Aweewe / House of Justice

The Supreme Court of the Commonwealth of the Northern Mariana Islands, 1 CMC § 3101, is the highest court of the United States Commonwealth of the Northern Mariana Islands (CNMI). The court exercises civil and criminal appellate jurisdiction over commonwealth law matters. It should not be confused with the District Court for the Northern Mariana Islands, which exercises jurisdiction over federal law.

The Supreme Court sits in the capital, Saipan, and consists of a Chief Justice and two Associate Justices. The CNMI has no intermediate appellate commonwealth law court, which means that the CNMI Supreme Court hears appeals directly from the trial-level Superior Court. The current Chief Justice is Alexandro Castro.

== History ==
The Supreme Court was created by commonwealth law on May 1, 1989. This was allowed under the terms of the Covenant to Establish a Commonwealth of the Northern Mariana Islands in Political Union with the United States of America, § 402(c), Act of Mar. 24, 1976, Pub. L. 94-241, 90 Stat. 263, codified as amended at 48 U.S.C. § 1801 note. The Covenant granted self-government to the CNMI, with the U.S. administering the islands under the former United Nations Trust Territory of the Pacific Islands system.

Prior to the creation of the Supreme Court, the Covenant provided that the District Court for the NMI would exercise original jurisdiction over federal law matters and appellate jurisdiction over commonwealth law matters. Covenant § 402(a) & (c). With the creation of the Supreme Court, the District Court's appellate jurisdiction was effectively eliminated. However, the Covenant provided that for 15 years following the creation of a commonwealth appellate court, appeals of that court's decisions would go to the United States Court of Appeals for the Ninth Circuit, just as if the decision was rendered by the District Court. Covenant § 403(a). As of May 1, 2004, CNMI Supreme Court appeals can be taken directly to the United States Supreme Court, thus giving the CNMI court relative parity with the highest courts of the 50 U.S. states.

The court typically hears cases at the House of Justice (Chamorro: Guma’ Hustisia; Carolinian: Iimwal Aweewe) in Susupe; however, some cases are also heard at the Kotten Tinian in San Jose and the Rota Centron Hustisia in Sinapalo. The CNMI's Supreme Court, like other territorial courts, are not listed at the U.S. Supreme Court's map of the judicial system.

== Current justices ==
Name	Start	Term ends	Appointer	Law School
Alexandro Castro, Chief Justice	October 11, 2012 (Note: Castro was originally appointed as an associate justice from July 1998 by Gov. Pedro P. Tenorio and served as acting chief justice from September 30, 2011 until his permanent appointment as chief justice.)	2034	Benigno Fitial (R)	UPNG
John Mangloña	May 2000	2030	Pedro P. Tenorio (R)	Creighton; Pacific (LLM)
Roberto Naraja	April 26, 2026	2028	Dave Apatang (I)	Gonzaga

== List of chief justices ==
Denotes acting

Name	Start	End
Jose Dela Cruz	1989	1995
Marty Taylor	1995	1998
Miguel Demapan	1998	2011
Alexandro Castro	2011	2012
Alexandro Castro	2012	present

== List of associate justices ==
=== Seat 1 ===
Name	Start	End
Jesus Borja	1989	1993
Pedro Atalig	1993	1997
Miguel Demapan	1998	1999
John Mangloña	2000	present

=== Seat 2 ===
Name	Start	End
Ramon Villagomez	1989	1997
Alexandro Castro	1998	2012
Perry Inos	2013	2026
Roberto Naraja	2026	present

== See also ==
- Politics of the Northern Mariana Islands
