= Typhoon Judy (1982) =

Pacific typhoon in 1982

Typhoon Judy (Susang)
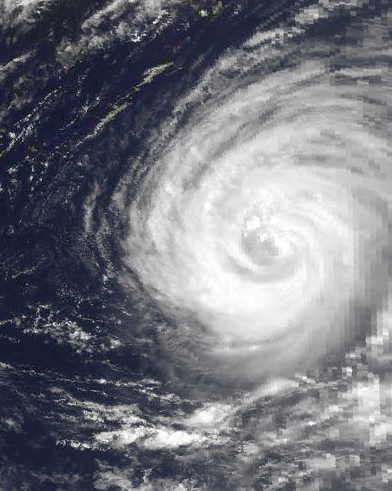
- Typhoon Judy at peak intensity on September 9

Meteorological history
- Formed: September 4, 1982
- Extratropical: September 12, 1982
- Dissipated: September 15, 1982

Typhoon
- 10-minute sustained (JMA)
- Highest winds: 150 km/h (90 mph)
- Lowest pressure: 955 hPa (mbar); 28.20 inHg

Category 2-equivalent typhoon
- 1-minute sustained (SSHWS/JTWC)
- Highest winds: 165 km/h (105 mph)
- Lowest pressure: 955 hPa (mbar); 28.20 inHg

Overall effects
- Fatalities: 26
- Missing: 8
- Damage: $505 million (2023 USD)
- Areas affected: Japan
- IBTrACS
- Part of the 1982 Pacific typhoon season

Typhoon Judy, known in the Philippines as Typhoon Susang, was the third tropical cyclone to affect Japan during the 1982 Pacific typhoon season. Forming east of the Philippines in tandem with another system on September 4, the disturbance continued to intensify, and was upgraded into a tropical storm early on September 6 and a typhoon on September 8 while tracking northwestward. On September 9, Judy attained its peak intensity, with winds of 150 km/h (90 mph). Thereafter, increased wind shear took a toll on the typhoon, as it turned northward on September 11 in the general direction of Japan under the influence of a mid-latitude cyclone. Judy passed over southeastern Japan on September 12; by this time, the typhoon had weakened considerably. Judy became an extratropical cyclone almost immediately thereafter.

Across Japan, a total of 26 people were killed, eight others were rendered as missing, and 86 were injured. A total of 61,000 homes were flooded. Three boats sank and highways were cut in 956 locations. It is estimated that 1,100 landslides occurred during the passage of the cyclone. Downtown Tokyo sustained the worst of the damage, where 8,000 homes were flooded. Approximately 200,000 travelers were stuck after 25 train lines were flooded, including 17,000 individuals who were stranded on 40 stalled trains.

== Meteorological history ==
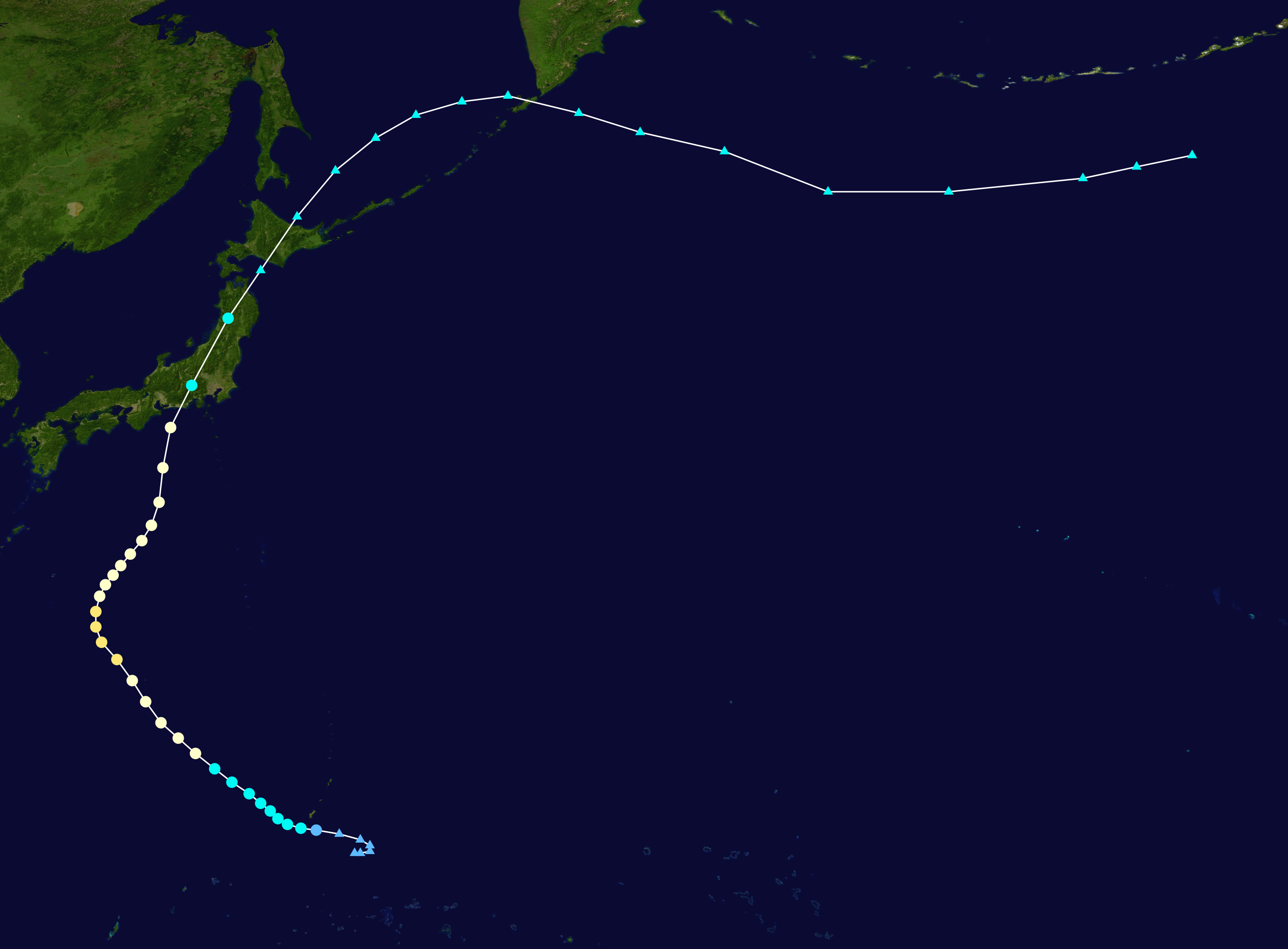
Map plotting the storm's track and intensity, according to the Saffir–Simpson scale Map key Saffir–Simpson scale Tropical depression (≤38 mph, ≤62 km/h) Tropical storm (39–73 mph, 63–118 km/h) Category 1 (74–95 mph, 119–153 km/h) Category 2 (96–110 mph, 154–177 km/h) Category 3 (111–129 mph, 178–208 km/h) Category 4 (130–156 mph, 209–251 km/h) Category 5 (≥157 mph, ≥252 km/h) Unknown Storm type Tropical cyclone Subtropical cyclone Extratropical cyclone, remnant low, tropical disturbance, or monsoon depression

The origins of Typhoon Judy can be traced back from a highly active monsoon trough along the low-latitudes of the Western Pacific basin in the first week of September. Two tropical disturbances soon developed, the first of which later spawned Typhoon Irving. By September 4, the systems developed a surface circulation. Later that day, the Joint Typhoon Warning Center (JTWC) issued a Tropical Cyclone Formation Alert (TCFA) on the second system. (Note: Wind estimates from the JMA and most other basins throughout the world are sustained over 10 minutes, while estimates from the United States-based Joint Typhoon Warning Center are sustained over 1 minute. 10 minute winds are about 1.14 times the amount of 1 minute winds.) This system rapidly became better organized, and on September 5, the Japan Meteorological Agency (JMA) starting watching the second system. (Note: The Japan Meteorological Agency is the official Regional Specialized Meteorological Center for the western Pacific Ocean.) Following an increase in organized thunderstorm activity near the center, the JTWC started issuing warnings on Tropical Depression 19 at 1600 UTC that day. At 2200 UTC on September 6, Hurricane Hunters reported winds of 80 km/h (50 mph) and a pressure of 994 mbar (30 inHg). Based on this, both the JTWC and the JMA upgraded the depression into Tropical Storm Judy early the next day.

Tropical Storm Judy was initially expected by the JTWC to move west-northwest because a subtropical ridge was expected to build north of the system. However, the ridge did not build, which enabled Judy to track northeastward under the influence of a tropical upper-tropospheric trough (TUTT) located to north of the cyclone. Meanwhile, the storm held its intensity of about 36 hours, but on September 7, the JMA upgraded the low into a severe tropical storm. Due to the lack of wind shear, Judy continued to intensify. Meanwhile, the Philippine Atmospheric, Geophysical and Astronomical Services Administration also briefly monitored the storm and assigned it with the local name Susang. At 0600 UTC on September 8, the JMA upgraded the system to typhoon status. The storm intensified slightly thereafter, and early the next day, the JMA estimated that Judy attained peak intensity of 150 km/h (90 mph) and a pressure of 950 mbar (28 inHg). Later on September 9, the JTWC reported that Judy reached peak intensity of 165 km/h (105 mph), equivalent to a mid-level Category 2 hurricane on the United States-based Saffir-Simpson Hurricane Wind Scale.

Shortly after its peak, cool air began to take a toll on the system as it ingested the remnants of the TUTT. By late on September 9, virtually all deep convection associated with Judy was removed from the center. Based on this, the JMA lowered the intensity of the system to 130 km/h (80 mph). Moving slower than expected due to the strong northwesterly flow over the Sea of Japan, the system became better organized due to a brief decrease in wind shear. However, Typhoon Judy failed to intensify further. On September 11, Judy began to accelerate in the general direction of Japan as interaction with the TUTT ceased. The next day, wind shear once again increased significantly; consequently, thunderstorm activity decreased along the southwest portion of Judy. Despite this, no change in intensity occurred. At 0800 UTC on September 12, Judy moved onshore at Omezaki Point on Honshu, while still producing hurricane-force winds. Four hours later, however, the JMA demoted Judy to a severe tropical storm. Midday on September 12, the JTWC downgraded Judy to a tropical storm. Several hours later, the agency noted that Judy had transitioned into an extratropical cyclone, with the JMA following suit the next day. On September 15, the JMA ceased monitoring the system.

== Impact ==
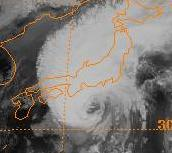
Typhoon Judy approaching landfall at Japan on September 12

Upon making landfall in Japan, 730 mm (29 in) of rain fell in Oshima, including 713 mm (28.1 in) of precipitation within 24 hours. Additionally, Kikugawamakinohara sustained a peak total of 91 mm (3.6 in) in an hour. Furthermore, a wind gust of 115 km/h (71 mph) was measured in Tsukubasan. A total of 34 people were killed and 86 were hurt. A total of 61,000 homes were flooded. Three boats sank. Downtown Tokyo sustained the worst of the damage. Nearby, the Kanda River overflowed their banks, flooding 8,000 dwellings, including 2,000 in the Shinjuku entertainment district. Throughout Tokyo, 590,100 homes lost power; however, power service was quickly restored to all but 20,000. In Shizuoka and Kanagawa, eight people perished because of mudslides. Offshore, one person died due to 3 to 4 m (9.8 to 13.1 ft) waves. One person died and three others were lost when a boat with 10 anglers was capsized due to rough seas off the coast of Kobe. Throughout Tokyo, 12 people perished and three were reportedly missing. Elsewhere, in Iiyama, a river overflowed their banks, flooding 631 residencies. Approximately 300 km (185 mi) north of Tokyo, in Sendai, a three-story apart complex was turned upside-down. All the residents living in the complex were rescued.

About 50,000 police men and soldiers were mobilized to help with rescue work. A total of 105 homes were destroyed. In addition, 1,100 landslides were reported while river banks broke in 20 places. According to officials, highways were cut in 956 spots and bridges were damaged in 43 locations. Around 200,000 passengers were stranded after railroad lines near Tokyo were inundated in 25 places. Moreover, around 17,000 persons on 40 stalled trains were stranded for the night. Air travel in Tokyo and Handa were halted due to strong winds. Damage nationwide were about ¥125.8 billion (US$505 million).

Typhoon Judy was the second storm to affect Japan within a month, as well as the third to system affect the nation during the 1982 Pacific typhoon season. From all three systems combined, the death toll exceeded 100. A few weeks later, Typhoon Ken became the fourth storm of the year to rake the islands of Japan.

== See also ==
- Typhoon Halong (2014)
- Typhoon Bess (1982)
- Typhoon Ken (1982)
- Typhoon Abby (1983)
- Typhoon Forrest (1983)
