= Typhoon Jack (1989) =

Pacific typhoon in 1989

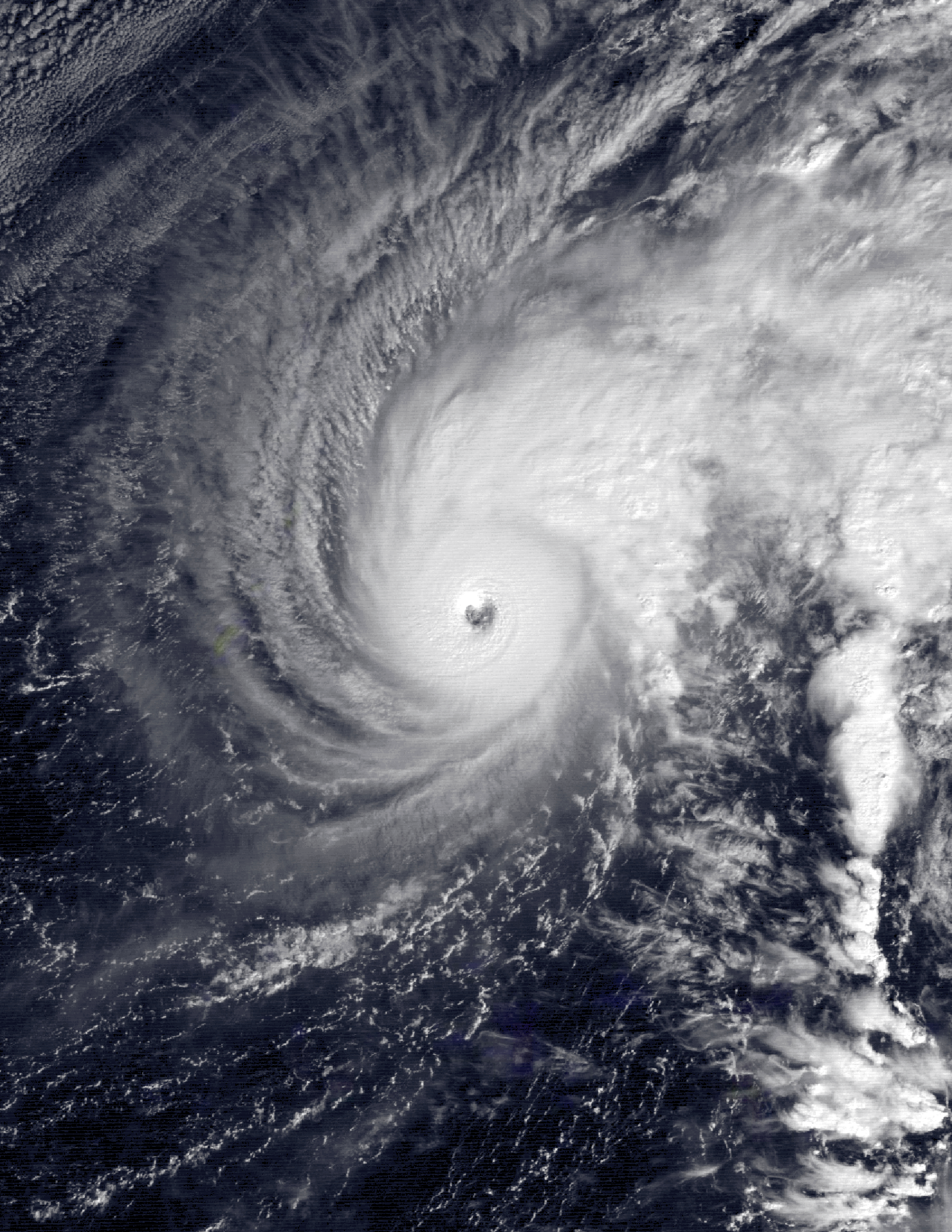
- Jack near peak intensity on December 26

Meteorological history
- Formed: December 22, 1989
- Dissipated: December 28, 1989

Very strong typhoon
- 10-minute sustained (JMA)
- Highest winds: 175 km/h (110 mph)
- Lowest pressure: 925 hPa (mbar); 27.32 inHg

Category 4-equivalent typhoon
- 1-minute sustained (SSHWS/JTWC)
- Highest winds: 230 km/h (145 mph)

Overall effects
- Fatalities: None reported
- Damage: None reported
- Areas affected: Guam, Northern Mariana Islands
- Part of the 1989 Pacific typhoon season

Typhoon Jack was a powerful and unusually slow-moving late-season tropical cyclone that threatened Guam and the Northern Mariana Islands in December 1989. The final tropical cyclone of the year in the western North Pacific, Jack was designated 36W by the Joint Typhoon Warning Center (JTWC) and 8932 by the Japan Meteorological Agency (JMA). The system developed near Truk on December 21–22 and strengthened rapidly while moving toward the Mariana Islands. The JMA estimated that Jack attained maximum 10-minute sustained winds of 95 kn (176 km/h; 109 mph) and a minimum pressure of 925 hPa (27.32 inHg). The JTWC assessed maximum one-minute sustained winds of 125 kn (232 km/h; 144 mph), equivalent to a Category 4 hurricane on the Saffir–Simpson scale.

After approaching to within about 185 nmi (343 km; 213 mi) of Guam, Jack became nearly stationary in weak steering currents. Its compact eye remained close enough to Guam for prolonged observation by weather radar at Andersen Air Force Base. Jack maintained its peak JTWC intensity from late December 25 through December 26, but then weakened with exceptional speed as the stationary cyclone upwelled cooler water beneath itself. In 24 hours, the JTWC reduced its estimate from 105 kn (194 km/h; 121 mph) to a 30 kn (56 km/h; 35 mph) exposed low-level circulation. Jack dissipated without making landfall. Contemporary preparations included advising residents to obtain emergency supplies, relocating B-52 bombers from Guam to Okinawa, and sending large United States Navy ships to sea.

== Meteorological history ==
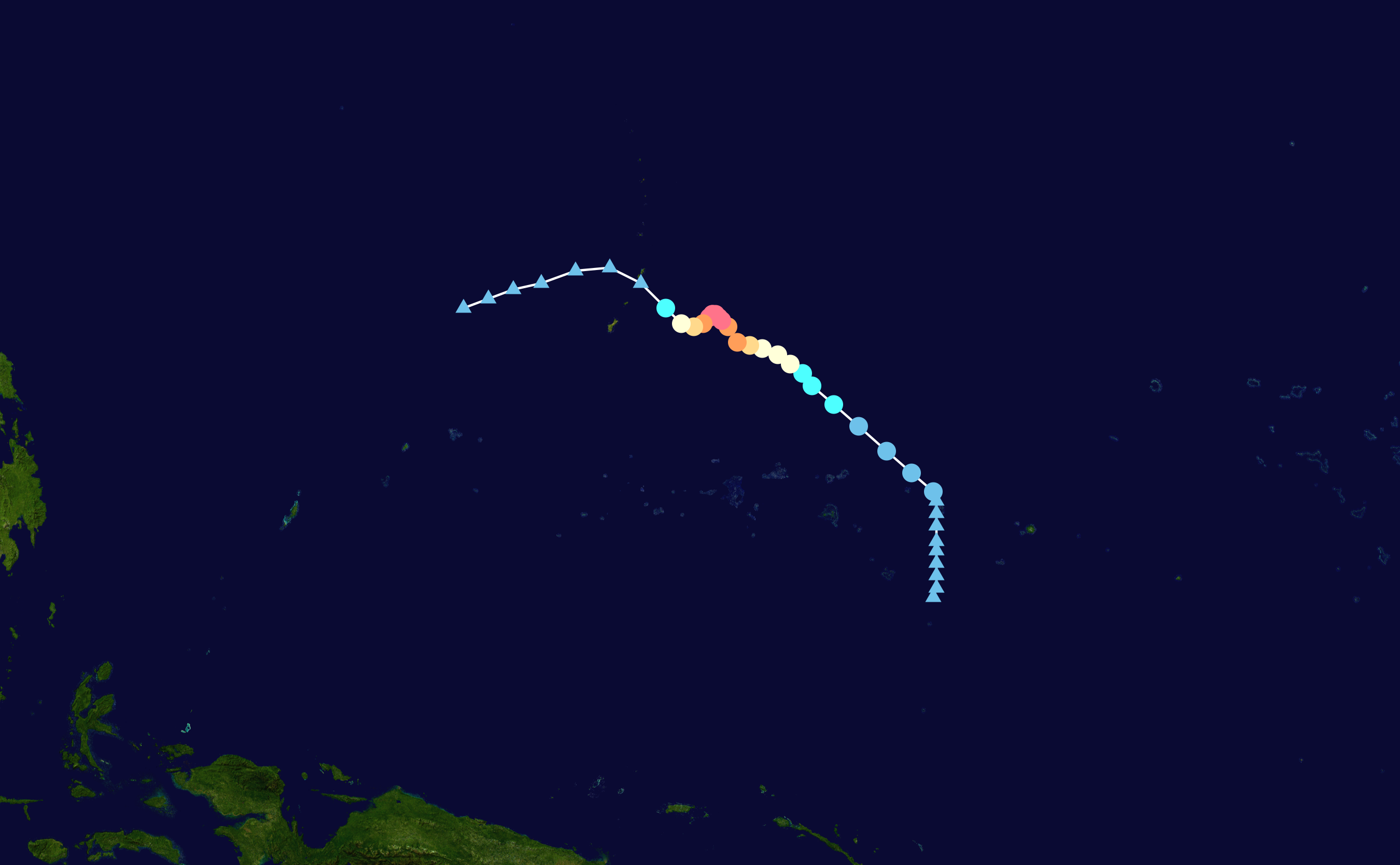
Map plotting the storm's track and intensity, according to the Saffir–Simpson scale Map key Saffir–Simpson scale Tropical depression (≤38 mph, ≤62 km/h) Tropical storm (39–73 mph, 63–118 km/h) Category 1 (74–95 mph, 119–153 km/h) Category 2 (96–110 mph, 154–177 km/h) Category 3 (111–129 mph, 178–208 km/h) Category 4 (130–156 mph, 209–251 km/h) Category 5 (≥157 mph, ≥252 km/h) Unknown Storm type Tropical cyclone Subtropical cyclone Extratropical cyclone, remnant low, tropical disturbance, or monsoon depression

The disturbance that became Jack was first identified by the JTWC on December 21 at 06:00 UTC as a broad, poorly organized area of convection about 240 nmi (444 km; 276 mi) southeast of Truk. Organization increased gradually, and the JTWC issued a Tropical Cyclone Formation Alert at 19:00 UTC on December 22. At that time, the disturbance was about 150 nmi (278 km; 173 mi) northeast of Truk, moving west-northwestward at 8 kn (15 km/h; 9 mph), with estimated surface winds of 20 to 30 kn (37 to 56 km/h; 23 to 35 mph). The Royal Observatory in Hong Kong analyzed the system as a tropical depression on December 22, about 1,400 km (870 mi) east-southeast of Guam.

At 00:00 UTC on December 23, the JTWC issued its first warning on Tropical Depression 36W, then situated about 400 nmi (741 km; 460 mi) southeast of Guam. The agency upgraded the depression to Tropical Storm Jack six hours later as its low-level circulation improved. The JMA separately classified Jack as a tropical storm at 00:00 UTC, beginning its five-day period as a named tropical cyclone. Forecasts initially called for Jack to continue northwestward toward a weakness in the subtropical ridge near Guam and then recurve in response to an approaching short-wave trough. Instead, the broad ridge prevented the trough from drawing the cyclone northward, leaving Jack in an extensive area of weak mid-level steering currents.

Jack became a typhoon on December 24 while about 590 km (367 mi) east of Guam. It briefly turned west before resuming a northwesterly motion on December 25. During this period, Jack underwent rapid intensification. According to the JTWC, its winds increased from 30 kn (56 km/h; 35 mph) late on December 22 to 115 kn (213 km/h; 132 mph) early on December 25, a rate approaching two Dvorak T-numbers per day. The cyclone reached its JTWC peak of 125 kn (232 km/h; 144 mph), with a Dvorak rating of T6.5, at 18:00 UTC on December 25 and maintained that intensity through 12:00 UTC on December 26. The JMA's best track placed Jack's peak at 95 kn (176 km/h; 109 mph) with a pressure of 925 hPa (27.32 inHg) early on December 26. Using 10-minute sustained winds, the Royal Observatory estimated a slightly lower peak of 54 m/s (194 km/h; 121 mph; 105 kn) and 935 hPa (27.61 inHg).

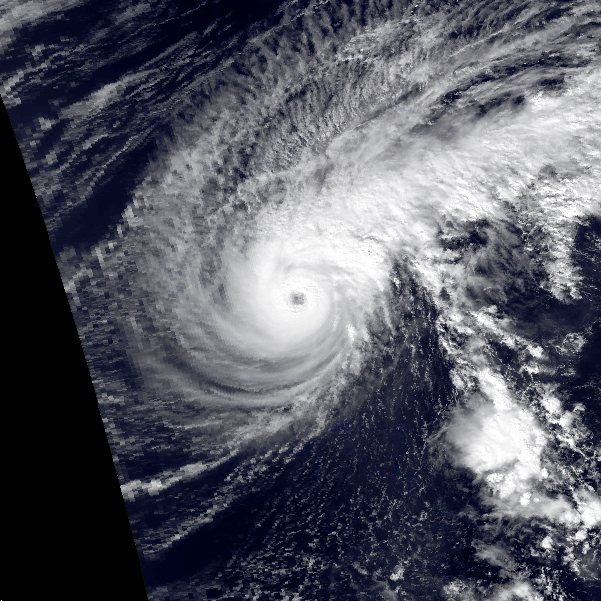
Jack intensifying east of Guam on December 25

Jack slowed dramatically as it neared the western edge of its track, coming within 185 nmi (343 km; 213 mi) of Guam. Its eye, about 20 to 30 nmi (37 to 56 km; 23 to 35 mi) wide, was observed for an extended period by radar at Andersen Air Force Base. The radar data indicated that the typhoon moved only about 60 nmi (111 km; 69 mi) between the morning of December 25 and early December 27, including less than 20 nmi (37 km; 23 mi) during one 24-hour period. Jack consequently remained almost stationary in a low-shear environment for nearly 48 hours. Its rapid strengthening was considered unusual because satellite imagery showed only one well-defined upper-level outflow channel, to the northeast, rather than the two efficient channels often associated with the most rapidly intensifying western Pacific typhoons.

By December 26, JTWC forecasters anticipated that prolonged wind stress beneath the stationary cyclone would cause upwelling and cool the ocean surface enough to weaken Jack. Although weakening began that day, the speed of the collapse exceeded forecasts. At 00:00 UTC on December 27, Jack still had JTWC-estimated winds of 105 kn (194 km/h; 121 mph). Twenty-four hours later, only a 30 kn (56 km/h; 35 mph) exposed low-level circulation remained about 120 nmi (222 km; 138 mi) northeast of Guam; the main mass of deep convection was displaced roughly 300 nmi (556 km; 345 mi) to its south. The JTWC stated that the rate of weakening exceeded 15 kn (28 km/h; 17 mph) during each six-hour forecast period. A later tropical-meteorology guide used Jack as an example of a stationary cyclone weakening over its own cooled ocean wake, noting a reduction from 120 kn (222 km/h; 138 mph) to 30 kn (56 km/h; 35 mph) in about 36 hours.

Post-storm analyses differed over which circulation to follow after Jack's convection separated from its original center. The Royal Observatory tracked the cyclone south-southwestward after a loop on December 26 and declared it a low-pressure area about 310 km (193 mi) east-southeast of Guam by the evening of December 27. The JMA carried Jack northward to 15.0°N, 146.0°E before ending its best track at 00:00 UTC on December 28. The JTWC also followed the exposed original center northwestward, placing it about 120 nmi (222 km; 138 mi) northeast of Guam on December 28. A secondary low-level center formed within the displaced convection and passed south of Guam on December 28. Satellite observations on December 29 also detected a cold cyclonic ocean eddy where Jack had stalled.

== Preparations and impact ==
As Jack intensified east of the Mariana Islands, operational forecasts suggested that it could pass between Guam and Saipan. On December 26, residents of Guam were advised to stock emergency supplies while the typhoon remained stalled about 200 mi (322 km) east of the island. Contemporary reports cited sustained winds of 135 mph (217 km/h; 117 kn) with gusts to 165 mph (266 km/h; 143 kn) based on the JTWC's operational estimates. The United States Air Force relocated B-52 bombers from Guam to Okinawa, while the United States Navy ordered large ships to sea to ride out the storm.

Jack remained offshore and did not make landfall. Its abrupt weakening on December 27 ended the immediate threat to Guam and Saipan. The JTWC and Royal Observatory annual summaries did not attribute deaths or significant property damage to the typhoon.

== See also ==
- Weather of 1989
- 1989 Pacific typhoon season
- Typhoon Paka (1997) – another December typhoon that threatened and later struck Guam
