= Typhoon Janis =

Pacific typhoon in 1992

Typhoon Janis (Gloring)
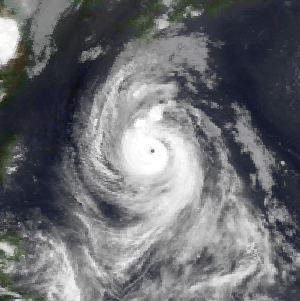
- Typhoon Janis at peak intensity on August 6

Meteorological history
- Formed: August 3, 1992
- Dissipated: August 9, 1992

Very strong typhoon
- 10-minute sustained (JMA)
- Highest winds: 175 km/h (110 mph)
- Lowest pressure: 935 hPa (mbar); 27.61 inHg

Category 4-equivalent typhoon
- 1-minute sustained (SSHWS/JTWC)
- Highest winds: 215 km/h (130 mph)
- Lowest pressure: 927 hPa (mbar); 27.37 inHg

Overall effects
- Fatalities: 13 confirmed
- Missing: 7
- Damage: $584 million (1992 USD)
- Areas affected: Guam; Taiwan; Japan
- IBTrACS
- Part of the 1992 Pacific typhoon season

Typhoon Janis, known in the Philippines as Typhoon Gloring, was an early-season typhoon that struck Japan during August 1992. An area of disturbed weather formed near Pohnpei in late-July 1992, and after an increase in thunderstorm activity, a tropical depression developed on August 3. After passing near Guam, Janis tracked generally westward, and on August 5, the storm was believed to have attained typhoon intensity. After intensifying at a brisk pace, Janis attained peak intensity on August 6 near Okinawa. Thereafter, the typhoon began to weaken and accelerate as it recurved towards Kyushu, where it made landfall on the next day. Land interaction took its toll on the typhoon as it tracked northeast, paralleling the western coast of Honshu. On August 9, Janis transitioned into an extratropical low over Hokkaido.

Five fishing boats sank offshore Taiwan, where one fisherman was killed, and six others were listed missing. Typhoon Janis was the second of two consecutive systems to move over the Japanese archipelago, with Tropical Storm Irving preceding it. Nationwide, twelve fatalities were reported and another was initially reported as missing. Sixty-seven others sustained injuries. A total 1,561 houses were destroyed while 1,508 others were flooded. In addition, 47 ships and 4,802 ha (11,870 acres) were damaged. Strong winds and torrential rains resulted in 350,000 customers losing power. An eight-hour suspension of high speed rail to Kyushu stranded over 20,000 people at Hiroshima Station. Greater than 80 domestic flights in Kyushu were cancelled, leaving an estimated 45,000 travelers stranded. Damage was estimated at ¥74 billion ($584 million USD). (Note: All currencies are converted from Japanese yen to United States Dollars using this with an exchange rate of the year 1992.) (Note: All damage totals are in 1992 values of their respective currencies.)

== Meteorological history ==
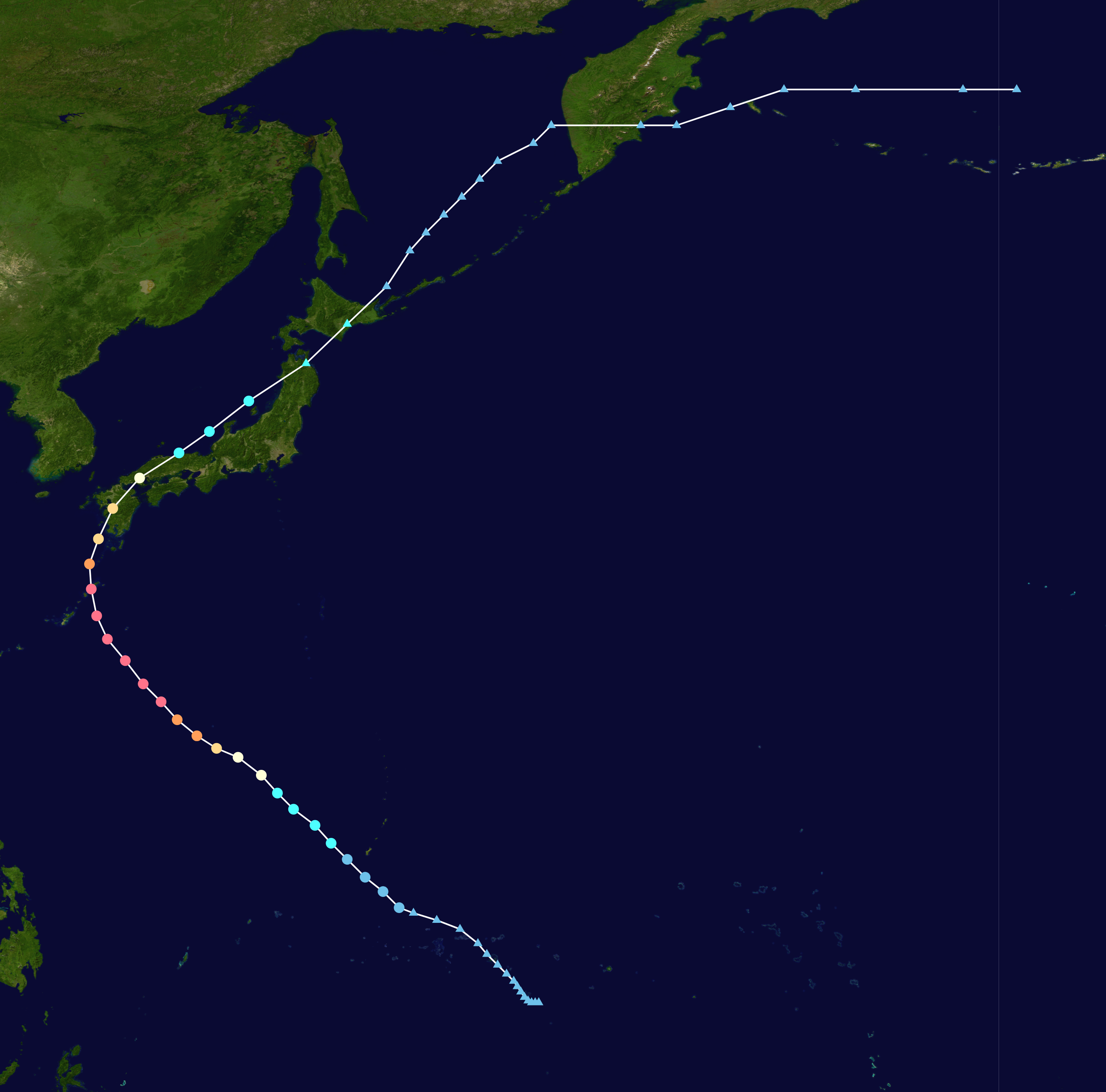
Map plotting the storm's track and intensity, according to the Saffir–Simpson scale Map key Saffir–Simpson scale Tropical depression (≤38 mph, ≤62 km/h) Tropical storm (39–73 mph, 63–118 km/h) Category 1 (74–95 mph, 119–153 km/h) Category 2 (96–110 mph, 154–177 km/h) Category 3 (111–129 mph, 178–208 km/h) Category 4 (130–156 mph, 209–251 km/h) Category 5 (≥157 mph, ≥252 km/h) Unknown Storm type Tropical cyclone Subtropical cyclone Extratropical cyclone, remnant low, tropical disturbance, or monsoon depression

The tropical disturbance that would later mature into Typhoon Janis formed near Pohnpei in the eastern Caroline Islands towards the end of July 1992. At 06:00 UTC on July 30, the Joint Typhoon Warning Center (JTWC) started tracking the system. Increased convective development led to the issuance of a Tropical Cyclone Formation Alert at 13:00 UTC on August 2. Intensification continued through the morning hours, and at 00:00 UTC, the JTWC issued the first warning on Tropical Depression 10W, with the Japan Meteorological Agency (JMA) following suit at the same time. (Note: The Japan Meteorological Agency is the official Regional Specialized Meteorological Center for the western Pacific Ocean.) (Note: Wind estimates from the JMA and most other basins throughout the world are sustained over 10 minutes, while estimates from the United States-based Joint Typhoon Warning Center are sustained over 1 minute. 10-minute winds are about 1.14 times the amount of 1-minute winds.) At 14:39 UTC, a Hurricane hunter aircraft was able to identify a well-defined center as well as winds of 55 km/h (35 mph). Passing near Guam and moving into the Philippine Sea, the depression organized further and was upgraded to a tropical storm at 18:00 UTC on August 3 by both the JTWC and JMA. At around this time, the Philippine Atmospheric, Geophysical and Astronomical Services Administration (PAGASA) also monitored the storm and assigned it with the local name Gloring. Midday on August 4, the JMA classified Janis as a severe tropical storm. Six hours later, Janis was declared a typhoon by the JTWC, with the JMA doing the same at 00:00 UTC on August 5. According to the JTWC, Janis entered a period of rapid deepening, intensifying 65 km/h (40 mph) during the day of August 5. At 00:00 UTC on August 6, the JTWC increased the intensity of the storm to 215 km/h (130 mph), equivalent to a low-end Category 4 hurricane on the United States–based Saffir-Simpson Hurricane Wind Scale. Operationally, the storm was believed to have attained winds 230 km/h (145 mph), based on Dvorak estimates from polar orbiting satellite imagery. However, in post-storm analysis, the JTWC determined that due to the high resolution of the satellite, the eye temperature of the storm was overestimated, prompting the agency to revise its Dvorak methods to better match intensity estimates derived from geostationary satellites.

After tracking towards the west-northwest during its early stages, Typhoon Janis turned towards the north-northeast and passed 165 km (105 mi) east of Okinawa. The JTWC estimated that Janis leveled off in intensity. However, the JMA estimates that Janis was still strengthening, and did not attain its highest intensity until 18:00 UTC on August 6, when the agency reported winds of 175 km/h (110 mph) and a barometric pressure of 935 mbar (27.61 inHg). After its peak intensity, the typhoon began to weaken and accelerate as it recurved towards Kyushu; this turn was correctly predicted by the JTWC. At the time of landfall on Kyushu late on August 7, the JTWC and JMA estimated winds of 175 km/h (110 mph) and 135 km/h (85 mph) respectively. Over Kyushu, land interaction took its toll on the typhoon, and the JTWC and JMA downgraded Janis to tropical storm intensity on August 8. The tropical storm moved to the northeast, paralleling the western coast of Honshu. At noon on August 9, Janis transitioned into an extratropical low over Hokkaido. It was lasted noted by the JMA around noon on August 13 near the International Date Line.

== Impact ==
=== Guam and Taiwan ===
During its formative stages, Jannis brought winds gusting to 55 km/h (35 mph) and 64 mm (2.25 in) of rain in 24 hours to the island of Guam, but caused no major damage. As Janis passed to the east of Taiwan, one fisherman was killed, and six individuals were missing when 8 m (26 ft) waves sank five fishing boats.

=== Japan ===
The typhoon dropped heavy rainfall across much of the Japanese archipelago, across western and northern portions of Japan. A peak rainfall total of 468 mm (18.4 in) was observed at Nagaoka District. A peak hourly rainfall total of 66 mm (2.6 in) was observed in Ube. Meanwhile, a peak daily precipitation total of 435 mm (17.1 in) fell in Kuraoka. A wind gust of 57 km/h (35 mph) was recorded in the city of Makurazaki. An airport at Amami Oshima measured winds of 127 km/h (79 mph) and gusts of 197 km/h (122 mph). Kadena Air Base reported maximum winds of 55 km/h (35 mph), gusting to 95 kilometres per hour (60 mph). The Marine Corps Air Station Futenma observed peak winds of 67 km/h (42 mph) and wind gusts of gust of 99 km/h (62 mph).

All transportation was cancelled on Okinawa and the storm resulted in ¥27.4 million in damage. A total of 8,293 households lost power in Tokushima Prefecture, and 25 roads were damaged in 156 location. Nearly 6,000 ha (14,825 acres) of crops were damaged. Prefecturewide, damage was estimated at ¥1.87 billion. A 54-year-old farmer near Susaki was killed when he was struck by a falling rock. Across Kōchi Prefecture, two people were wounded. Roads were damaged in 145 spots and 3,282 ha (8,110 acres) of crops were damaged. A total of 19,855 houses in 17 municipalities, including Susaki, suffered a blackout after falling trees downed power lines. Damage in the prefecture exceeded ¥2.86 billion. Twenty-four flights were cancelled to and from Takamatsu Airport. A total of 964 homes lost power while 220 others were destroyed. Five people were hurt in Ehime Prefecture. Nearly 45,000 households lost power and almost 7,000 ha (17,295 acres) of crops were damaged, amounting to ¥1.85 billion. An 83-year-old woman from Kagoshima Prefecture was killed in the storm when a taxi was overturned by high winds. Twenty-four people were injured and sixty homes were damaged. Flooding and landslides forced 500 people to evacuate from the slopes of Mount Unzen. Five people were wounded and sixteen individuals lost their homes in Oita Prefecture. Damage estimates were placed at ¥15.1 billion. Elsewhere, damage in Saga Prefecture totaled to ¥2.15 billion. Strong winds injured eight people in Fukuoka Prefecture, including three by falling glass. Twenty-eight homes were damaged and ten were destroyed. Damage was estimated at ¥20.6 billion.

On Honshu, 830 ha (2,050 acres) of crops were damaged in Wakayama prefecture, which was estimated at ¥461 million. Three people sustained injuries and twenty-five homes were damaged in Hyōgo Prefecture. A total of 120 dwellings were damaged or destroyed and roads were damaged in 189 spots. Across five cities, nearly 13,000 lost power. Damage was estimated at ¥710 million. A total of 917 power lines were downed in Hiroshima Prefecture. Forty flights were cancelled at the Hiroshima Airport while roads were damaged at more than locations. Across the southern portion of the prefecture, 19 landslides happened. Additionally, 428 homes were damaged and 25 other houses were destroyed. Damage estimates reached ¥2.11 billion. Heavy rain caused rivers alongside the Japan National Route 315 to overflow its banks, which resulted in street flooding. A total of 165 homes were damaged in Yamaguchi Prefecture. Damaged was estimated at ¥1.08 billion. Five people were killed in Kyoto Prefecture, including two swimmers that drowned offshore. Twenty-two trains were cancelled on the afternoon on August 9 in Tottori prefecture. Further north, lightning strikes led to 5,500 units losing power in Wakabayashi-ku, 1,300 others on Ōshima Island, and 1,300 others on Yamamoto. Six dwellings were damaged in Aomori Prefecture. There, 12 roads were damaged and 2,556 power units were knocked out. Seventy trains were cancelled in Hokkaido Prefecture. A total of 101 homes were damaged and 53 were destroyed, which resulted 437 homeless individuals. Sixty households were ordered to evacuate by officials. Damage there was roughly ¥7.2 billion.

Typhoon Janis was the final of two successive systems to move over the Japanese archipelago, with Tropical Storm Irving preceding it. Nationwide, twelve fatalities were reported and another was initially reported as missing. Sixty-seven others sustained injuries. A total 1,561 houses were destroyed while 1,508 others were flooded. Moreover, 47 ships and 4,802 ha (11,870 acres) were damaged. High winds and torrential rains caused the temporary loss of electricity to 350,000 homes across the southernmost of Japan's four main islands. An eight-hour suspension of high speed rail to Kyushu stranded over 20,000 people at Hiroshima Station. Over 80 domestic flights in Kyushu were cancelled, which left an estimated 45,000 travelers stranded. Monetary damage totaled ¥74 billion (US$584 million).

== See also ==
- Tropical Storm Harry (1991) - similar early-season Japan-hitting typhoon
- Tropical Storm Nathan (1993) - similar early-season Japan-hitting typhoon
