= Cyclone Jude =

South-West Indian Ocean tropical cyclone in 2025

Tropical Cyclone Jude
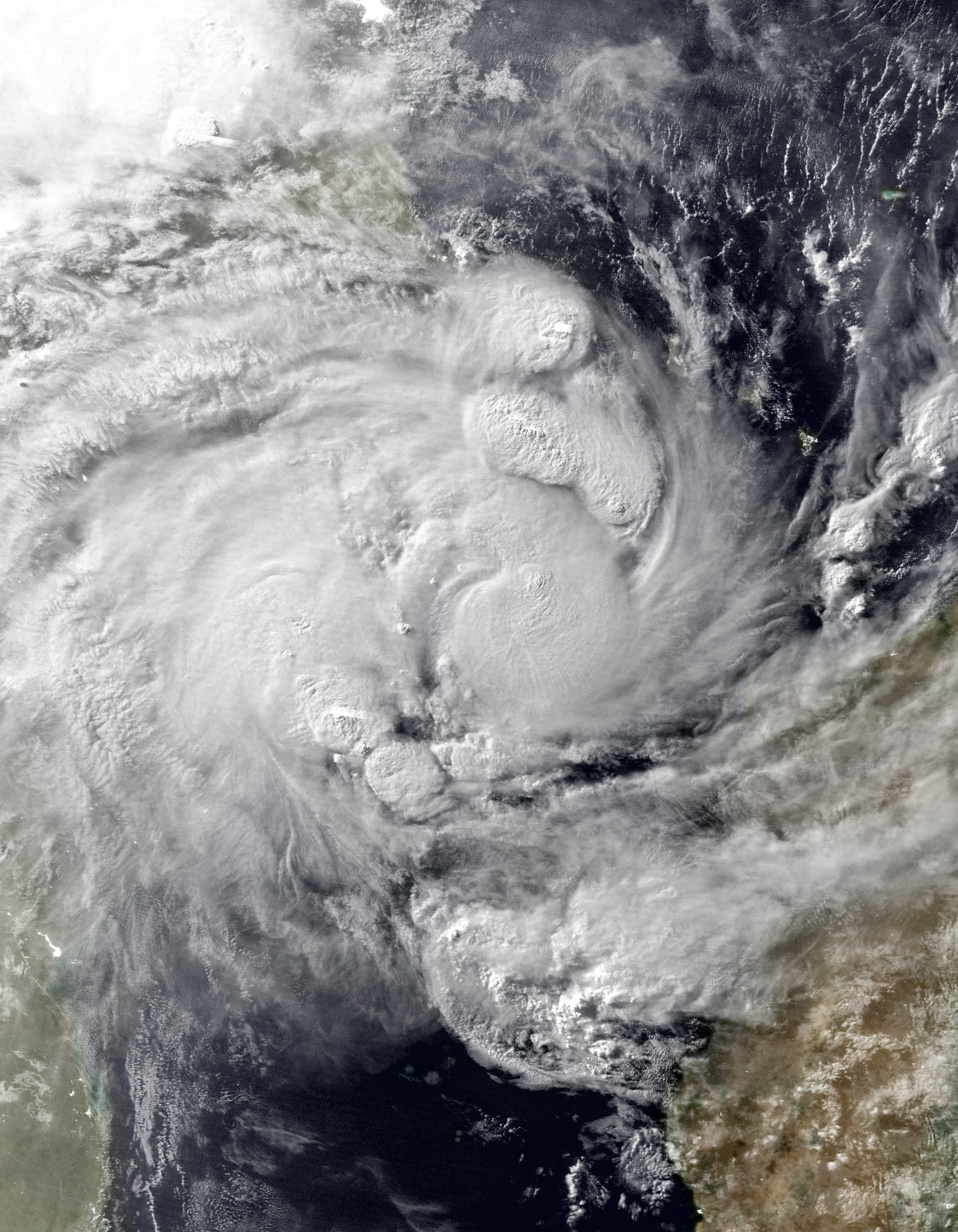
- Jude at peak intensity on 9 March

Meteorological history
- Formed: 6 March 2025
- Extratropical: 16 March 2025
- Dissipated: 18 March 2025

Tropical cyclone
- 10-minute sustained (MFR)
- Highest winds: 140 km/h (85 mph)
- Lowest pressure: 970 hPa (mbar); 28.64 inHg

Category 1-equivalent tropical cyclone
- 1-minute sustained (SSHWS/JTWC)
- Highest winds: 150 km/h (90 mph)
- Lowest pressure: 975 hPa (mbar); 28.79 inHg

Overall effects
- Fatalities: 21
- Injuries: 130+
- Missing: 4
- Damage: $110 million (2025 USD)
- Areas affected: Chagos Islands, Madagascar, Mayotte, Comoros, Mozambique, southern Malawi
- Part of the 2024–25 South-West Indian Ocean cyclone season

Tropical Cyclone Jude was a deadly tropical cyclone that impacted Mozambique and Madagascar. The eleventh storm and eighth tropical cyclone of the 2024–25 South-West Indian Ocean cyclone season, Jude originated from a disturbance south of the Chagos Islands on 6 March. Total losses are estimated at US$110 million.

== Meteorological history ==
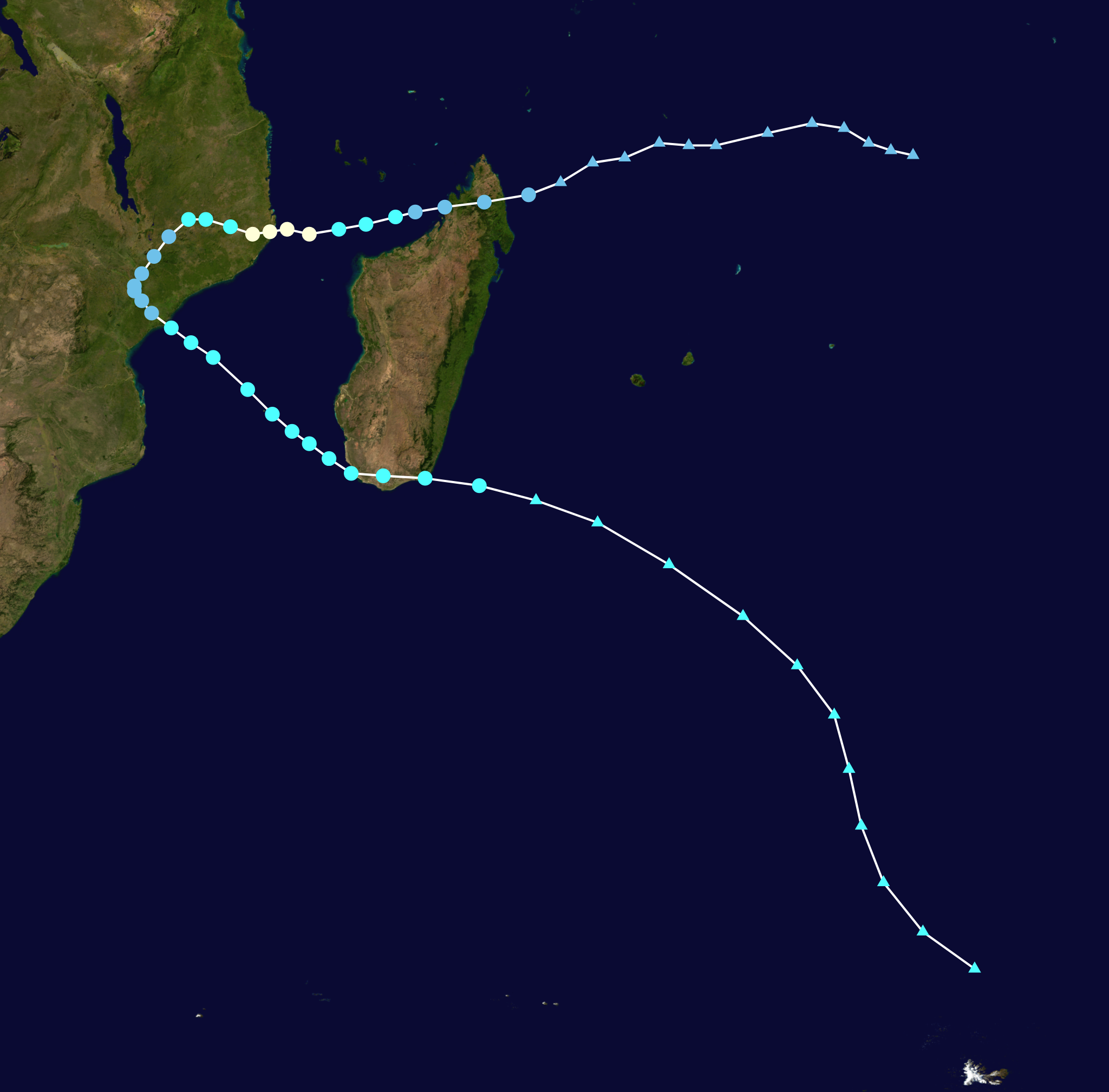
Map plotting the storm's track and intensity, according to the Saffir–Simpson scale Map key Saffir–Simpson scale Tropical depression (≤38 mph, ≤62 km/h) Tropical storm (39–73 mph, 63–118 km/h) Category 1 (74–95 mph, 119–153 km/h) Category 2 (96–110 mph, 154–177 km/h) Category 3 (111–129 mph, 178–208 km/h) Category 4 (130–156 mph, 209–251 km/h) Category 5 (≥157 mph, ≥252 km/h) Unknown Storm type Tropical cyclone Subtropical cyclone Extratropical cyclone, remnant low, tropical disturbance, or monsoon depression

A disturbance south of the Chagos Islands was spotted by Météo-France on 6 March. Initially categorized as a zone of disturbed weather, it was upgraded to a depression the following day. It was further upgraded to a moderate tropical storm on 8 March, where it got the name Jude. The system then crossed the northern part of Madagascar and lost some organization, before quickly reorganizing in the Mozambique Channel. By 9 March, Jude was upgraded to a severe tropical storm as it neared Mozambique, and eventually attained tropical cyclone status shortly before making landfall on 10 March.

The center of the tropical storm passed near Nampula on March 10 and Blantyre, Malawi the next day, weakening to a tropical depression.

On 12 March, Jude's path turned southeastward and followed the Zambezi River Valley towards the coast, re-emerging at its mouth in the Chinde District around 22:30 UTC. Météo Madagascar placed the south of the island under green warning (pre-alert). On 13 March, the system weakened back to a moderate tropical storm over the southern Mozambique Channel, forecasted to pass north of Europa Island, and the alert was upgraded to yellow in Madagascar.

14 March, Jude was upgraded to a severe tropical storm as it approached the southernmost tip of Madagascar, and the cyclone alert was raised to red for Toliara Province. Just after 00:00 UTC on 15 March, Jude made landfall near Itampolo. Experiencing friction over mountainous terrain and increasing wind shear aloft, Jude became asymmetrical and weakened. It exited the Indian Ocean east-northeast of Ambovombe, Taolagnaro District. At 00:00 UTC on 16 March, Jude's wind pattern became elongated, and it was downgraded to a post-tropical storm moving rapidly east-southeastward in the latest RSMC Réunion bulletin. The latter became extratropical the next day and the Joint Typhoon Warning Center (JTWC) stopped tracking it.

== Preparations and impact ==
=== Madagascar ===
On 6 March, a weather system began forming south-west of Diego Garcia Island in the Indian Ocean, moving westward. Following its passage in Madagascar on 8 March, at least 4,100 people were affected in 8 districts across 5 regions, including one person killed, one injured, and 3,617 displaced, mainly in Maroantsetra District, in the north. The displaced are hosted across nine temporary sites. Also, more than 1,300 houses were flooded, including 37 damaged, and 37 classrooms were submerged and 3 others destroyed. After a week, at least 15,000 people were affected after Tropical Storm Jude made its second landfall on 15 March, primarily in Atsimo Andrefana Region in the south. The storm resulted in one death and displaced 10,587 people across 24 temporary sites. Jude made landfall about 70 km north of Itampolo Municipality in Ampanihy District, then crossed several isolated districts in the Grand Sud (Ampanihy, Beloha, Tsihombe, Bekily), followed by Ambovombe and Amboasary, before exiting the island through Tolagnaro District on 16 March.

Much of the damage was caused by strong winds, as most towns and cities in Grand Sud are structurally fragile and highly vulnerable to cyclones. This was also the first time a strong weather system crossed the entire southern region. The storm led to severe destruction, with 1,172 houses flooded, 1,640 partially damaged, and 1,160 destroyed. The Education Sector was heavily impacted, leaving 48,000 students out of school, as 89 classrooms were destroyed and 182 partially damaged. Successive severe weather systems since February—including Tropical Storm Elvis, the inter-tropical convergence zone, Tropical Cyclone Honde and Tropical Storm Jude—have brought heavy rains, further complicating accessibility across Grand Sud. Four districts—Ampanihy, Bekily, Beloha and Tsihombe—remain inaccessible by road or UN Humanitarian Air Service (UNHAS), hindering the delivery of assistance. Additionally, the UN Department of Safety and Security (UNDSS) has restricted road movement on National Road 10, which connects Toliara, Betioky, Ampanihy, Beloha, Tsihombe, and Ambovombe due to poor accessibility conditions. The storm had first made landfall in northern Madagascar on 8 March before moving toward Mozambique. The initial impact left one person dead, one injured, and 4,100 people affected, including 3,617 displaced across nine temporary sites, primarily in Maroantsetra District in the north.

=== Mozambique ===
Cyclone Jude made landfall in Mozambique’s Nampula province on 10 March 2025, bringing heavy rainfall and strong winds. As of 13 March, the National Institute for Disaster Management (INGD) has recorded 375,214 people affected and 81,149 houses either damaged or destroyed. Severe flooding and extensive infrastructure damage have been reported in Nampula and Zambezia provinces, further exacerbating vulnerabilities in communities already struggling with food insecurity, displacement, and limited access to essential services. This cyclone season has been particularly severe, with Nampula and Zambezia previously hit by Tropical Cyclones Chido (December 2024) and Dikeledi (January 2025), which collectively affected approximately 684,000 people. As Jude moved inland, it weakened to a severe storm over Manica, Niassa, Sofala and Tete, adding to the cumulative impact of consecutive cyclones and increasing humanitarian needs.

In addition to displacement concerns, health risks are rising. According to the latest cholera bulletin, 56 cholera cases have been reported in severely affected Nampula province as of 14 March 2025. While no new cases have emerged in the past 24 hours, concerns persist over potential outbreaks due to contaminated water sources and overcrowded temporary accommodation facilities.

=== Malawi ===
Nearly 20,650 people were affected by Cyclone Jude, with three missing and 4,883 displaced when Cyclone Jude hit the country between 10 and 12 March, according to the Department of Disaster Management Affairs (DoDMA). The tropical storm impacted nine councils in the south, including Nsanje, Neno, Blantyre District, Mwanza, Phalombe, Zomba City, Mangochi District, Thyolo, and Mulanje. Phalombe District recorded the highest number of affected people (9,968), followed by Nsanje (2,637). Districts in the Southern Region experienced heavy rainfall in 24 hours, with Chiladzulu recording the highest amount at 98.3 mm between 12 and 13 March.

=== Overall ===
Cyclone Jude had caused 21 deaths, 130 more people injured and 4 people missing.

== See also ==
- Tropical cyclones in 2025
- Weather of 2025
