= List of storms named Jean =

The name Jean has been used for eleven tropical cyclones worldwide: ten in the Western Pacific Ocean and one in the Australian region.

In the Western Pacific:

- Typhoon Jean (1945) (T4521) – a strong typhoon that affected Taiwan and Eastern China.
- Typhoon Jean (1947) (T4727) – a strong typhoon that made landfall in the Philippines.
- Typhoon Jean (1956) (T5617, 17W) – a powerful Category 4-equivalent typhoon that made landfall in the northern Philippines.
- Tropical Depression Jean (1960) (02W) – did not make landfall.
- Typhoon Jean (1962) (T6227, 77W) – a Category 2-equivalent typhoon that made landfall in the Philippines.
- Typhoon Jean (1965) (T6515, 19W, Rubing) – a Category 5-equivalent typhoon that brought heavy winds to Southern Japan.
- Typhoon Jean (1968) (T6802, 03W) – a Category 3 typhoon that directly struck Saipan.
- Typhoon Jean (1971) (T7115, 15W, Pepang) – a strong typhoon that affected the Philippines, South China and Vietnam.
- Tropical Storm Jean (1974) (T7411, 13W, Heling) – affected Eastern China.
- Typhoon Jean (1977) (T7718, 18W) – remained over open waters.

In the Australian Region:

- Cyclone Jean (1973) – a Category 3 severe tropical cyclone that remained over open waters.

== See also ==
- Cyclone Jeanett (2002) – a European windstorm that affected Western Europe
