= Typhoon Jane =

Pacific typhoon in 1950

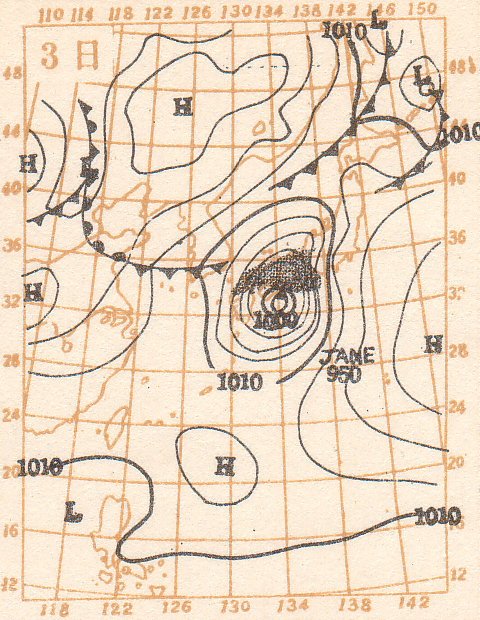
- Weather map on September 3 showing Typhoon Jane's landfall in Japan

Meteorological history
- Formed: August 29, 1950
- Extratropical: September 3, 1950
- Dissipated: September 7, 1950

Unknown-strength storm
- 10-minute sustained (JMA)
- Lowest pressure: 940 hPa (mbar); 27.76 inHg

Category 3-equivalent typhoon
- 1-minute sustained (SSHWS/JTWC)
- Highest winds: 185 km/h (115 mph)

Overall effects
- Fatalities: 398 confirmed
- Missing: 141
- Damage: Unknown
- Areas affected: Japan
- IBTrACS
- Part of the 1950 Pacific typhoon season

Typhoon Jane was a catastrophic and deadly tropical cyclone that left significant effects to Japan during the 1950 Pacific typhoon season. It caused over 398 reported deaths and 141 to be missing, mainly due to the landslides and flooding. It also destroyed some battle and cargo ships. The sixth reported typhoon of the season, Jane was first mentioned in weather maps as a tropical depression to the east of the Philippines. It quickly strengthened to a tropical storm as it moved to the northwest. It then curved to the northeast, reaching its peak intensity of 185 km/h (115 mph) before weakening and striking Minami in Tokushima Prefecture on September 3 as a Category 2 typhoon. It quickly weakened, passing through the Awaji Island and Kobe before becoming extratropical in the Sea of Japan on the same day. The extratropical remnants of the system persisted until it was no longer tracked on September 7.

== Meteorological history ==
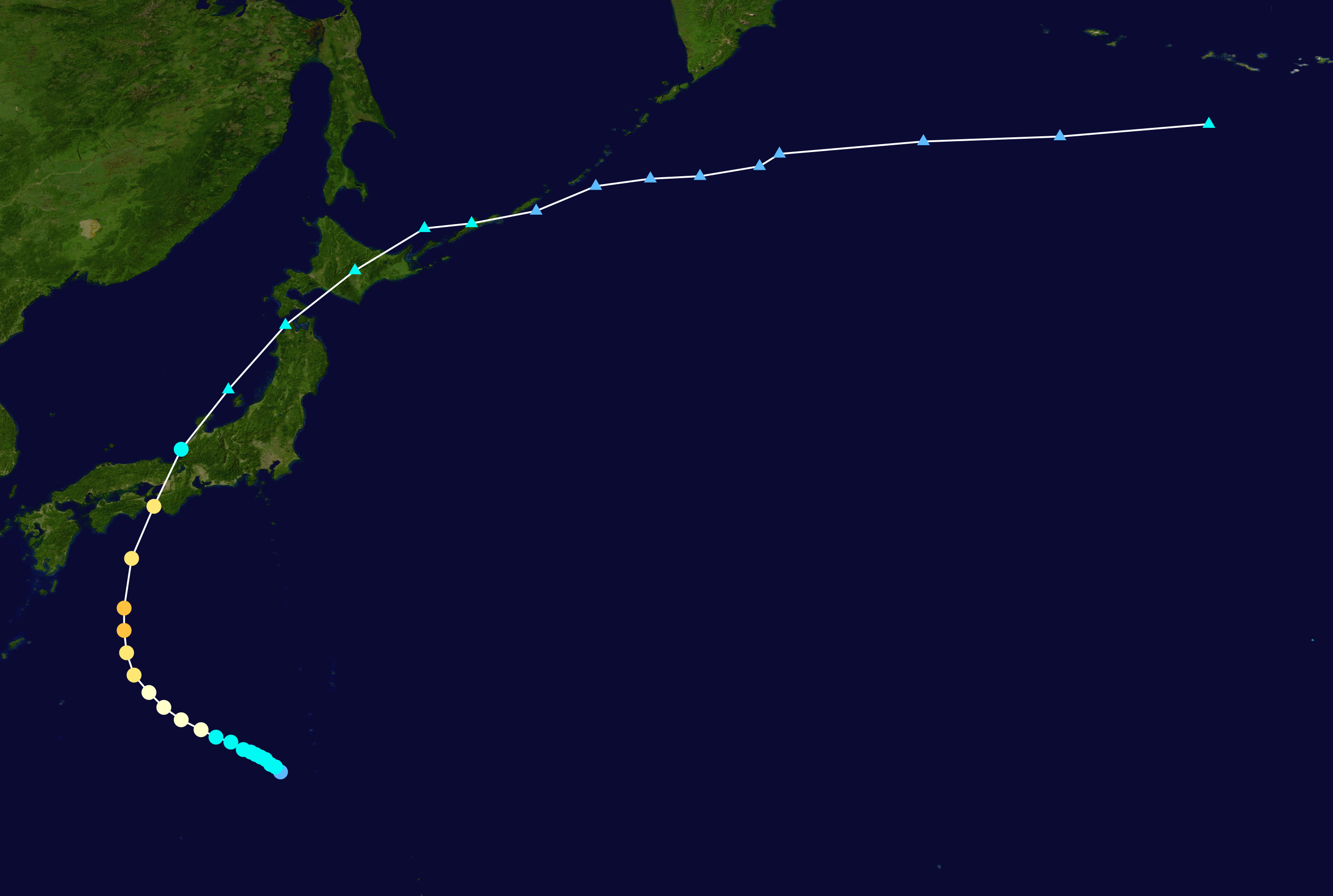
Map plotting the storm's track and intensity, according to the Saffir–Simpson scale Map key Saffir–Simpson scale Tropical depression (≤38 mph, ≤62 km/h) Tropical storm (39–73 mph, 63–118 km/h) Category 1 (74–95 mph, 119–153 km/h) Category 2 (96–110 mph, 154–177 km/h) Category 3 (111–129 mph, 178–208 km/h) Category 4 (130–156 mph, 209–251 km/h) Category 5 (≥157 mph, ≥252 km/h) Unknown Storm type Tropical cyclone Subtropical cyclone Extratropical cyclone, remnant low, tropical disturbance, or monsoon depression

Jane was first seen in weather maps as a tropical depression to the west of Hagatna, Guam on 06:00 UTC of August 29 by the China Meteorological Agency (CMA). Roughly six hours later, the agency upgraded the system to a tropical storm; however, the Fleet Weather Center didn't followed suit until 00:00 UTC of the next day. It slowly organized while moving to the northwest and on 18:00 UTC of August 31, the system intensified to a minimal typhoon. As it turned to the north, it strengthened to a Category 2 typhoon, roughly south of Japan. On 21:00 UTC of the next day, the CMA reported that Jane further intensified to a Category 3 typhoon as it started to curved to the north-northeast, following by the Fleet Center that upgraded the system on 06:00 UTC on September 2. It soon reached its peak intensity of about 185 km/h (115 mph) and a minimum barometric pressure of 940 mbar. On the same day, Jane started to weaken due to unfavorable conditions and on 00:00 UTC of September 3, it made landfall near Muroto in Kōchi Prefecture as a Category 2 typhoon. It quickly weakened, passing through the town of Hiwasa and near Kobe before becoming extratropical in the Sea of Japan on 09:00 UTC of September 4. It then moved near Maizuru in Kyoto Prefecture before hitting Oshima Peninsula, both experiencing gale-force winds before moving ashore in the Sea of Okhotsk on the same day. It then weakened as it passed to the south of Magadan Oblast, before being absorbed by another system near the Aleutian Islands on September 6.

== Preparations ==
The winds and large waves from Jane forced over 283,000 individuals over Miyazaki, Miyakonojō and Nobeoka in Japan to evacuate. Some houses were prepared for strong winds, sandbags were placed on river embankments and many schools in western portion of the country were ordered to close. Refugee and disaster places were ordered for the evacuees. Coast guards also warned marine ships and fish boats to dock to ports and all police stations in Tokyo were advised to ready for possible rescue operations.

== Impact ==
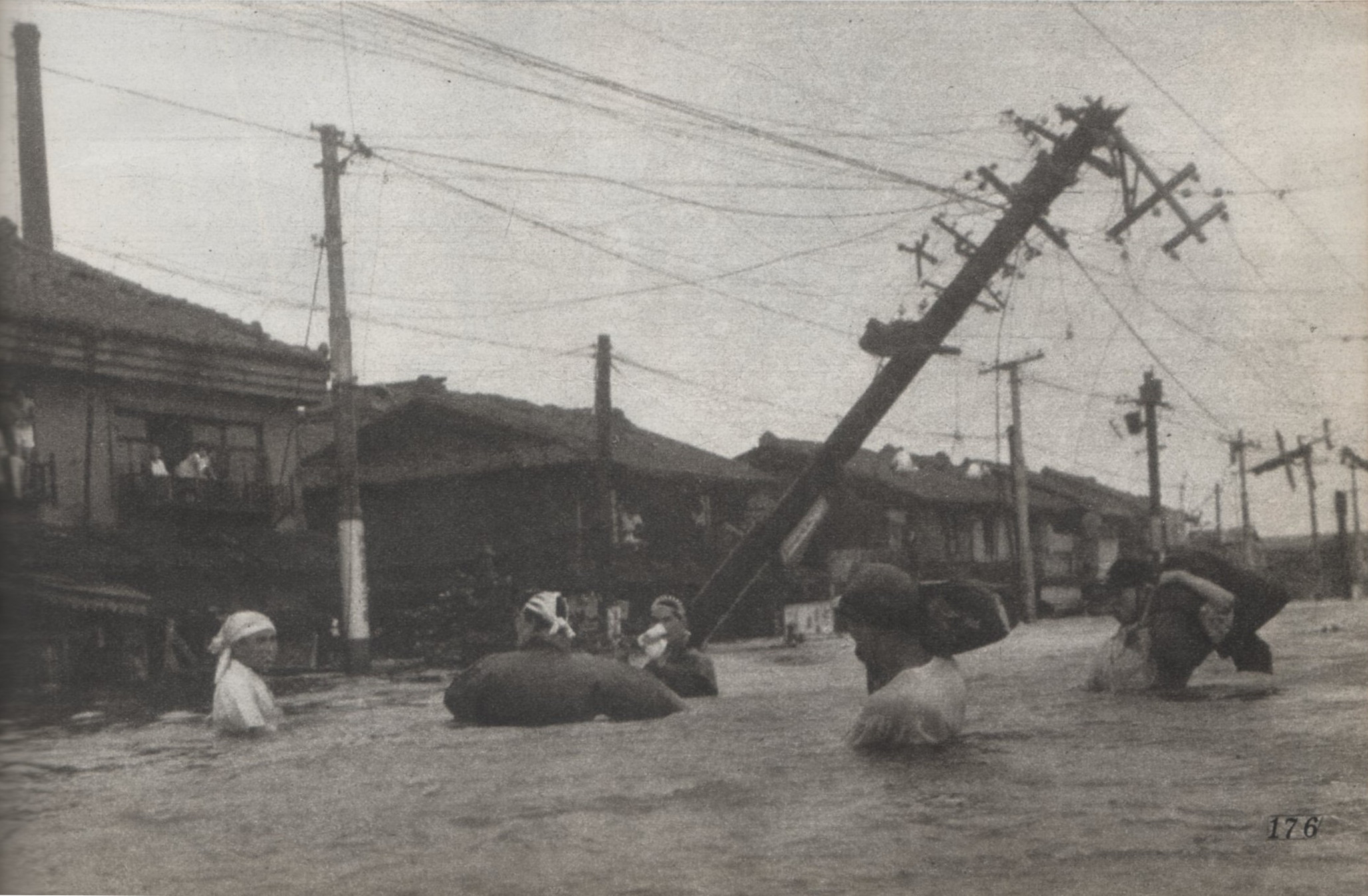
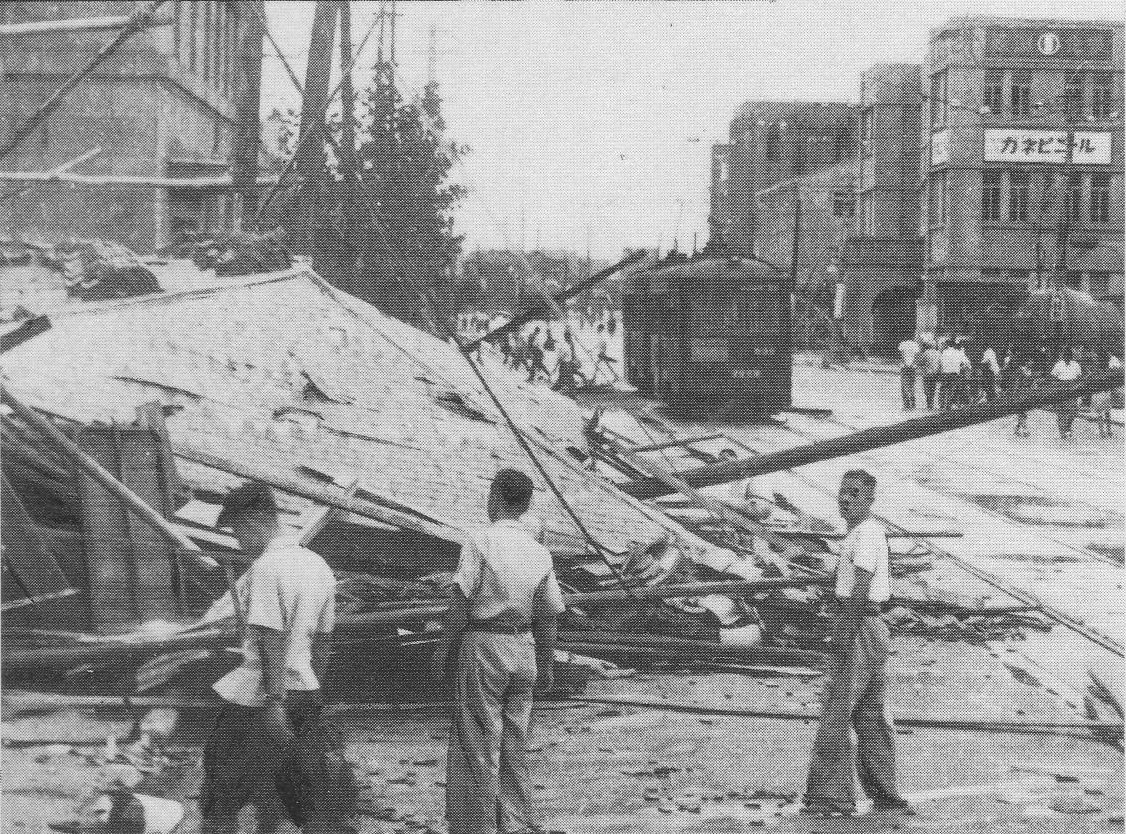
Effects of Jane in Osaka Prefecture

The effects of Jane were greater due to strong winds and its generated precipitation. It was also regarded as the worst typhoon to affect Japan in sixteen years.

The Shikoku and Kii Peninsula were blew by a 35 mph wind speed, while the maximum instantaneous wind speed recorded by the Kobe Marine Meteorological Observatory were 40 mph but due to damaged measuring instruments, the wind speeds may be higher. Strong winds also downed power lines throughout the western part of the country. In Osaka Bay, strong typhoons caused storm surges, causing over 700 ships damaged and many houses flooded. Over 12,000 houses were completely destroyed and many were flooded. Jane also destroyed the 700-year old Tahuto Pagoda in Wakayama.

In total, over 398 people were killed, mainly due to unexpected floods and enormous landslides, while another 131 individuals were reported to be missing, all due to the storm. Over 26,000 individuals were injured, in the other hand. The largest loss in marine ships was the damages attained by the Tatsuharu Maru, which was scheduled to leave the country to its destination to the United States, when it was destroyed by the storm surges and strong winds from the typhoon.

== Aftermath and retirement ==
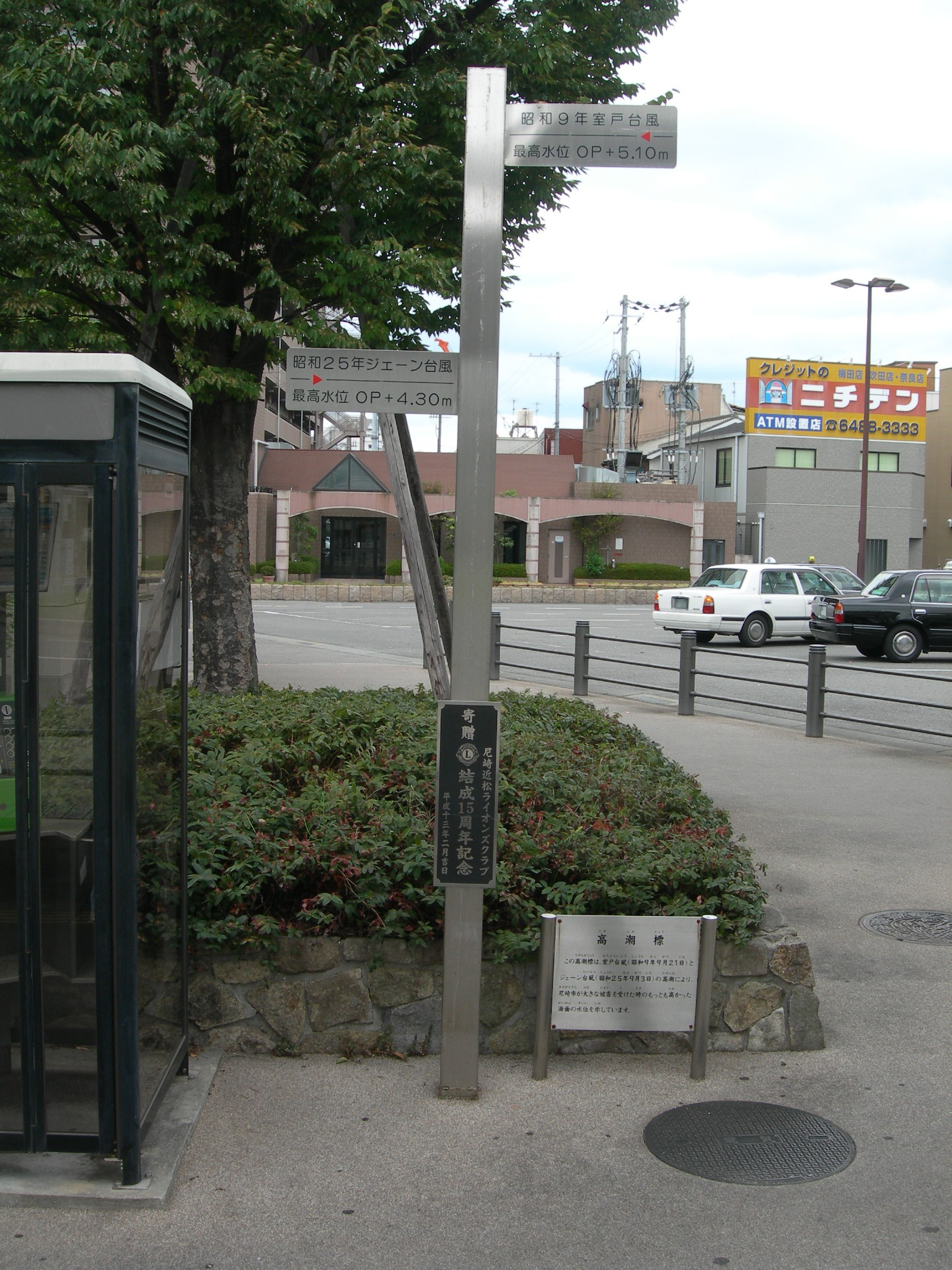
A post showing the high water level of Muroto Typhoon (top) and Jane (bottom)

On September 6, the Government of Japan dispatched its cabinet ministers to assess damages from Jane. At a conference, these ministers agreed to release ¥65,600,000 for the typhoon-stricken areas, like Kyushu. An agency donated kids and adult clothes, being enough for 92,500 persons.

After the season, the name Jane was decommissioned by the World Meteorological Organization due to its destructive effects to the country. It was replaced with the name June for subsequent seasons.

== See also ==
- Typhoon Hagibis (2019) – a violent typhoon that caused widespread destruction in Japan
