= List of Category 3 South Pacific severe tropical cyclones =

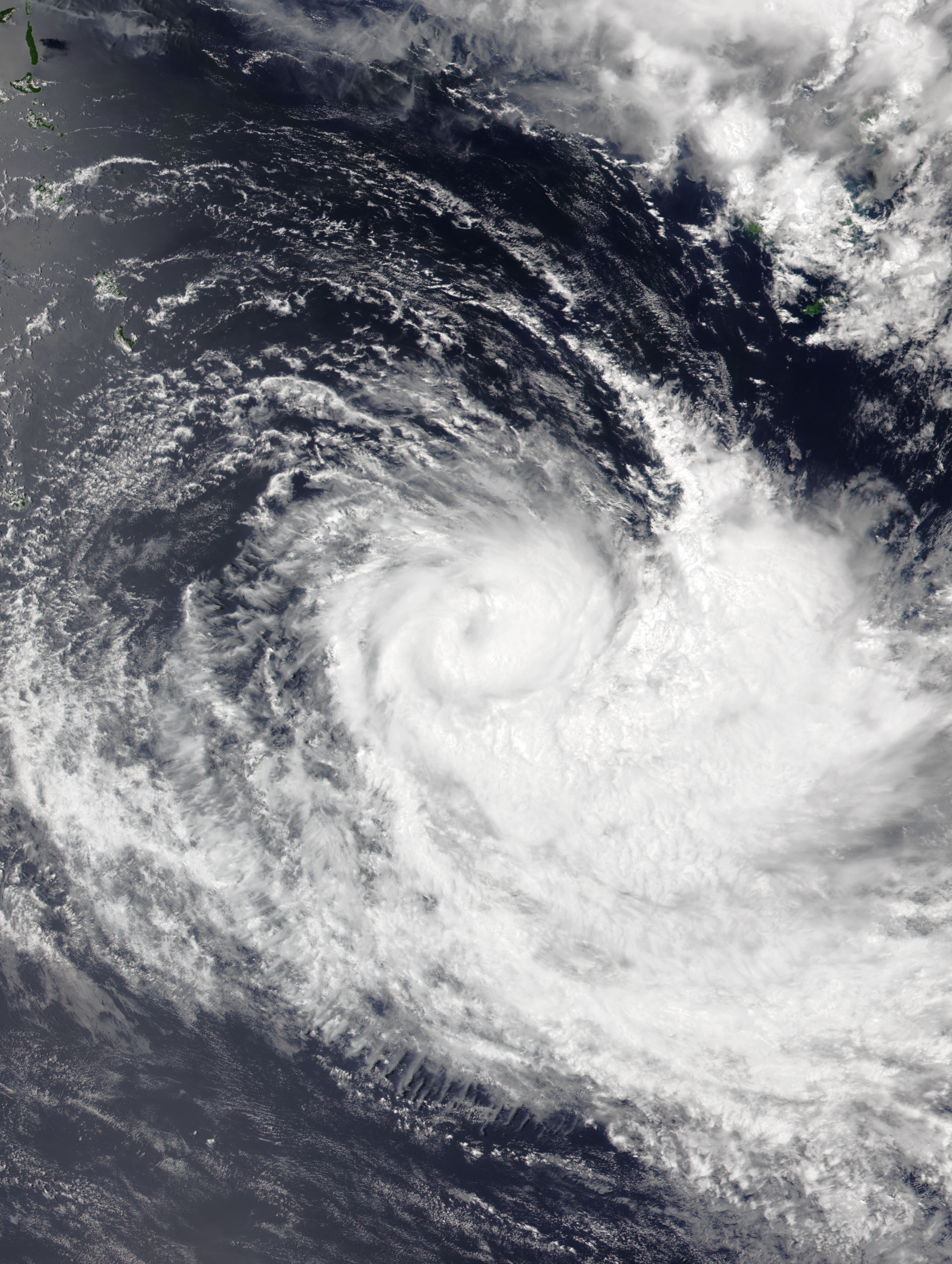
Cyclone Cody

Category 3 the third-highest classification on the Australian tropical cyclone intensity scale is used to classify tropical cyclones, that have 10-minute sustained winds of 64–85 knots (119–157 km/h; 74–98 mph). As of 2019 79 tropical cyclones have peaked as Category 3 severe tropical cyclones in the South Pacific tropical cyclone basin, which is denoted as the part of the Pacific Ocean to the south of the equator and to the east of 160°E. The earliest tropical cyclone to be classified as a Category 3 severe tropical cyclone was Dolly which was classified as a Category 3 severe tropical cyclone. The latest was Ana as it moved south-eastwards away from the Fijian Islands. This list does include any tropical cyclones that went on to peak as a Category 4 or 5 severe tropical cyclone, while in the Southern Pacific tropical cyclone basin.

== Background ==
The South Pacific tropical cyclone basin is located to the south of the Equator between 160°E and 120°W. The basin is officially monitored by the Fiji Meteorological Service and the New Zealand MetService, while other meteorological services such as the Australian Bureau of Meteorology, Météo-France as well as the United States Joint Typhoon Warning Center also monitor the basin. Within the basin a Category 3 severe tropical cyclone is a tropical cyclone that has 10-minute mean maximum sustained wind speeds of 64–85 knots (119–157 km/h; 74–98 mph) on the Australian tropical cyclone intensity scale. A named storm could also be classified as a Category 3 tropical cyclone if it is estimated, to have 1-minute mean maximum sustained wind speeds of between 96–112 knots (178–207 km/h; 110–129 mph) on the Saffir–Simpson hurricane wind scale. This scale is only officially used in American Samoa, however, various agencies including NASA also use it to compare tropical cyclones. A Category 3 tropical cyclone is expected to cause catastrophic devastation, if it significantly impacts land at or near its peak intensity.

== Systems ==
Name	Duration	Peak intensity		Areas affected	Damage (USD)	Deaths	Refs
Name	Duration	Wind speed	Pressure	Areas affected	Damage (USD)	Deaths	Refs
Dolly	February 22–23, 1970	130 km/h (80 mph)	965 hPa (28.50 inHg)				
Emma	March 2–4, 1970	130 km/h (80 mph)	965 hPa (28.50 inHg)				
Ursula	December 2–16, 1971	130 km/h (80 mph)	965 hPa (28.50 inHg)				
Carlotta	January 14–21, 1972	155 km/h (100 mph)	940 hPa (27.76 inHg)	Solomon Islands, Vanuatu, New Caledonia		4	
Wendy	February 1–7, 1972	155 km/h (100 mph)	945 hPa (27.91 inHg)	Vanuatu, New Caledonia		4	
Yolande	March 20–21, 1972	120 km/h (75 mph)	965 hPa (28.50 inHg)	Vanuatu, New Caledonia			
Agatha	March 27–29, 1972	120 km/h (75 mph)	980 hPa (28.94 inHg)	Cook Islands			
Gail	April 15, 1972	120 km/h (75 mph)	960 hPa (28.35 inHg)				
Ida	June 3, 1972	130 km/h (80 mph)	965 hPa (28.50 inHg)	Solomon Islands, New Caledonia			
Bebe	October 21–24, 1972	155 km/h (100 mph)	945 hPa (27.91 inHg)	Fiji, Tuvalu	$20 million	24	
Lottie – Natalie	December 9–10, 1973	130 km/h (80 mph)	965 hPa (28.50 inHg)	Fiji, Tonga	Moderate	80	
Alison	March 5–9, 1975	155 km/h (100 mph)	945 hPa (27.91 inHg)	Vanuatu, New Caledonia, New Zealand	$1 million		
Robert	April 20–21, 1977	130 km/h (80 mph)	980 hPa (28.94 inHg)	French Polynesia			
Bob	February 4–6, 1978	155 km/h (100 mph)	945 hPa (27.91 inHg)	Vanuatu, New Caledonia, New Zealand	Moderate	1	
Charles	February 18–20, 1978	155 km/h (100 mph)	945 hPa (27.91 inHg)	Samoan Islands			
Gordon	January 6–7, 1979	130 km/h (80 mph)	965 hPa (28.50 inHg)	Australia, Vanuatu, New Caledonia	Severe		
Meli	March 26–29, 1979	155 km/h (100 mph)	945 hPa (27.91 inHg)	Fiji	Severe	53	
Peni	January 3, 1980	120 km/h (75 mph)	970 hPa (28.64 inHg)	Fiji			
Sina	March 13, 1980	120 km/h (75 mph)	970 hPa (28.64 inHg)	New Caledonia, New Zealand			
Arthur	January 13–15, 1981	130 km/h (80 mph)	965 hPa (28.50 inHg)				
Cliff	February 11–13, 1981	120 km/h (75 mph)	970 hPa (28.64 inHg)				
Freda	March 4–7, 1981	150 km/h (90 mph)	955 hPa (28.20 inHg)				
Tahmar	March 11–12, 1981	120 km/h (75 mph)	970 hPa (28.64 inHg)	French Polynesia			
Hettie	January 28–30, 1982	130 km/h (80 mph)	965 hPa (28.50 inHg)				
Mark	January 25–27, 1983	150 km/h (90 mph)	955 hPa (28.20 inHg)	Fiji			
Nano	January 25–26, 1983	120 km/h (75 mph)	970 hPa (28.64 inHg)	French Polynesia			
William	April 19–22, 1983	150 km/h (90 mph)	955 hPa (28.20 inHg)	French Polynesia		1	
Beti	February 3, 1984	120 km/h (75 mph)	970 hPa (28.64 inHg)	New Caledonia			
Eric	January 16–18, 1985	150 km/h (90 mph)	955 hPa (28.20 inHg)	Vanuatu, Fiji			
Nigel	January 17–19, 1985	150 km/h (90 mph)	955 hPa (28.20 inHg)	Vanuatu, Fiji			
Freda	January 27–29, 1985	150 km/h (90 mph)	955 hPa (28.20 inHg)				
Martin	April 12, 1986	120 km/h (75 mph)	970 hPa (28.64 inHg)				
Namu	May 16–22, 1986	150 km/h (90 mph)	955 hPa (28.20 inHg)	Solomon Islands	$10 million	111	
Raja	December 27–31, 1986	150 km/h (90 mph)	955 hPa (28.20 inHg)	Wallis and Futuna, Fiji	$14 million	2	
Sally	December 28, 1986 – January 3, 1987	150 km/h (90 mph)	955 hPa (28.20 inHg)	Cook Islands, French Polynesia	$24.6 million		
Tusi	January 17–21, 1987	150 km/h (90 mph)	955 hPa (28.20 inHg)	American Samoa	$24 million		
Wini	March 3–6, 1987	120 km/h (75 mph)	965 hPa (28.50 inHg)	Samoan Islands	Extensive	None	
Yali	March 9, 1987	120 km/h (75 mph)	970 hPa (28.64 inHg)	Solomon Islands, Vanuatu, New Caledonia			
Cilla	March 1, 1987	120 km/h (75 mph)	970 hPa (28.64 inHg)				
Hinano	February 24–26, 1989	150 km/h (90 mph)	970 hPa (28.64 inHg)	French Polynesia			
Ivy	February 26–28, 1989	155 km/h (100 mph)	960 hPa (28.35 inHg)	New Caledonia, Vanuatu			
Judy	February 26, 1989	150 km/h (90 mph)	965 hPa (28.50 inHg)				
Lili	April 8–10, 1989	150 km/h (90 mph)	955 hPa (28.20 inHg)	New Caledonia			
Peni	February 15–17, 1990	120 km/h (75 mph)	970 hPa (28.64 inHg)	Cook Islands			
Sina	November 26–28, 1990	140 km/h (85 mph)	960 hPa (28.35 inHg)	Fiji, Tonga	$18.5 million		
Tia	November 13–21, 1991	140 km/h (85 mph)	960 hPa (28.35 inHg)	Solomon Islands, Vanuatu	Unknown	None	
Daman	February 11–19, 1992	130 km/h (80 mph)	965 hPa (28.50 inHg)	Tokelau, Fiji; Vanuatu, New Zealand			
Kina	December 29, 1992 – January 4, 1993	150 km/h (90 mph)	955 hPa (28.20 inHg)	Fiji, Tonga	$110 million	26	
Lin	February 1–3, 1993	120 km/h (75 mph)	970 hPa (28.64 inHg)				
Polly	February 27 – March 9, 1993	155 km/h (100 mph)	945 hPa (27.91 inHg)	Solomon Islands, New Caledonia; New Zealand			
Rewa	January 4–5, 1994	150 km/h (90 mph)	950 hPa (28.05 inHg)				
Tomas	March 24–26, 1994	155 km/h (100 mph)	955 hPa (28.20 inHg)				
Fergus	March 24–26, 1994	150 km/h (90 mph)	955 hPa (28.20 inHg)				
Evan	March 24–26, 1994	130 km/h (80 mph)	965 hPa (28.50 inHg)				
Hina	March 17–18, 1997	120 km/h (75 mph)	975 hPa (28.79 inHg)	Fiji, Tonga, Tuvalu; Wallis and Futuna	$15.2 million		
Keli	June 11–13, 1997	150 km/h (90 mph)	955 hPa (28.20 inHg)	Tuvulu, Tonga, Wallis and Futuna	$10,000		
Martin	November 1–4, 1997	155 km/h (100 mph)	945 hPa (27.91 inHg)	Cook Islands, French Polynesia	$17.6 million	28	
Osea	November 24–28, 1997	150 km/h (90 mph)	955 hPa (28.20 inHg)	Cook Islands, French Polynesia			
Katrina	January 8–11, 1998	150 km/h (90 mph)	955 hPa (28.20 inHg)	Solomon Islands, Vanuatu, Queensland			
Yali	March 21–25, 1998	130 km/h (80 mph)	965 hPa (28.50 inHg)				
Zuman	March 31 – April 3, 1998	150 km/h (90 mph)	955 hPa (28.20 inHg)				
Cora	December 25–28, 1998	140 km/h (85 mph)	960 hPa (28.35 inHg)	Tonga	$12 million		
Frank	February 18–21, 1999	150 km/h (90 mph)	955 hPa (28.20 inHg)				
Hali	March 16, 1999	120 km/h (75 mph)	970 hPa (28.64 inHg)				
Iris	January 26, 2000	150 km/h (90 mph)	964 hPa (28.47 inHg)				
Jo	January 26, 2000	120 km/h (75 mph)	972 hPa (28.70 inHg)				
Mona	March 9–11, 2000	120 km/h (75 mph)	965 hPa (28.50 inHg)				
Claudia	February 12, 2002	120 km/h (75 mph)	965 hPa (28.50 inHg)				
Ami	January 9–15, 2003	150 km/h (90 mph)	950 hPa (28.05 inHg)	Fiji, Tonga, Tuvalu	$65 million	14	
Gina	June 4–9, 2003	150 km/h (90 mph)	950 hPa (28.05 inHg)	Solomon Islands			
Kerry	January 8, 2005	120 km/h (75 mph)	970 hPa (28.64 inHg)				
Jim	January 29–31, 2006	155 km/h (100 mph)	950 hPa (28.05 inHg)				
Vaianu	February 13–22, 2006	130 km/h (80 mph)	965 hPa (28.50 inHg)				
Wati	November 23–25, 2006	155 km/h (100 mph)	950 hPa (28.05 inHg)				
Yani	November 23–24, 2006	140 km/h (85 mph)	960 hPa (28.35 inHg)				
Gene	January 30 – February 2, 2008	155 km/h (100 mph)	945 hPa (27.91 inHg)	Fiji	$35 million	8	
Pat	February 6–11, 2010	140 km/h (85 mph)	960 hPa (28.35 inHg)	Cook Islands	$13.7 million		
Rene	February 9–17, 2010	155 km/h (100 mph)	945 hPa (27.91 inHg)	Samoan islands, Tonga	$18 million	None	
Yasi	January 31, 2011	150 km/h (90 mph)	963 hPa (28.44 inHg)	Tuvalu, Fiji, Solomon Islands; Vanuatu, Queensland	Minor	1	
Bune	March 22–29, 2011	130 km/h (80 mph)	967 hPa (28.56 inHg)	Fiji	None	None	
Garry	January 24–26, 2013	150 km/h (90 mph)	965 hPa (28.50 inHg)	Tokelau, Wallis and Futuna; Samoan Islands, Cook Islands	Minor	None	
Lusi	March 12–13, 2014	150 km/h (90 mph)	960 hPa (28.35 inHg)	Fiji, New Caledonia; New Zealand, Vanuatu	$3 million	10	
Ola	February 1, 2015	150 km/h (90 mph)	955 hPa (28.20 inHg)	New Caledonia	None	None	
Victor	January 14–22, 2016	150 km/h (90 mph)	958 hPa (28.29 inHg)	Northern Cook Islands, Niue, Tonga	None	None	
Zena	April 5–7, 2016	130 km/h (80 mph)	975 hPa (28.79 inHg)	Solomon Islands, Vanuatu; Fiji, Tonga	Minimal	2	
Amos	April 22–23, 2016	150 km/h (90 mph)	965 hPa (28.50 inHg)	Fiji, Wallis and Futuna, Samoan Islands	Minimal	None	
Cook	April 9–10, 2017	155 km/h (100 mph)	961 hPa (28.38 inHg)	Vanuatu, New Caledonia, New Zealand	Moderate	1	
Keni	April 9–11, 2018	155 km/h (100 mph)	960 hPa (28.35 inHg)	Vanuatu, Fiji, Tonga	$5 million	None	
Oma	February 11 – 22, 2019	130 km/h (80 mph)	974 hPa (28.76 inHg)	Solomon Islands, Vanuatu, New Caledonia	$50 million	0	

== 2020's ==
Name	Duration	Peak intensity		Areas affected	Damage (USD)	Deaths	Refs
Name	Duration	Wind speed	Pressure	Areas affected	Damage (USD)	Deaths	Refs
Tino	January 17 – 18, 2020	120 km/h (75 mph)	970 hPa (28.64 inHg)	Fiji, Niue, Solomon Islands, Samoa, Tonga, Tuvalu, Vanuatu	Unknown	Unknown	
Uesi	February 4 – 13, 2020	130 km/h (80 mph)	975 hPa (28.79 inHg)	Solomon Islands, Vanuatu, New Caledonia, New Zealand	Unknown	Unknown	
Ana	January 26 – February 3, 2021	120 km/h (75 mph)	970 hPa (28.64 inHg)	Vanuatu, Fiji	Unknown	Unknown	
Cody	January 5 – 13, 2022	130 km/h (80 mph)	971 hPa (28.67 inHg)	Fiji	Unknown	1	
Gabrielle	5 – 11 February 2023	150 km/h (90 mph)	959 hPa (28.32 inHg)	Solomon Islands, Norfolk Island, New Zealand			
Mal	10 – 15 November 2023	130 km/h (80 mph)	965 hPa (28.50 inHg)	Fiji	Unknown	None	

== Other systems ==
In addition to the systems listed above, Severe Tropical Cyclone's Bebe, Gyan, Abigail, Nisha-Orama, Oscar, Tomasi, Veena, Uma, Bola, Wasa-Arthur, Joni, Sarah, Beti, Kim, Paula, Waka, Eseta, Ivy, Daman, Funa, Freda and Hola were all considered to have 1-minute sustained wind speeds equivalent to a Category 3 hurricane on the SSHWS by the JTWC.

Operationally, the BoM considered Severe Tropical Cyclone Dovi to have peaked with 10-minute sustained wind-speeds of 155 km/h (100 mph) which made it a Category 3 severe tropical cyclone. However, New Zealand's MetService estimated that Dovi had peaked with 10-minute sustained windspeeds of 175 km/h (110 mph) which made it a Category 4 severe tropical cyclone.

== See also ==
- List of Category 3 Atlantic hurricanes
- List of Category 3 Pacific hurricanes
