= 2019–20 Southern Hemisphere tropical cyclone season =

The 2019–20 Southern Hemisphere tropical cyclone season may refer to one of three different basins and respective seasons:

- 2019–20 South-West Indian Ocean cyclone season, west of 90°E
- 2019–20 Australian region cyclone season, between 90°E and 160°E
- 2019–20 South Pacific cyclone season, east of 160°E

Subtropical Storm Kurumí also formed within this time period.
