= List of storms named Wati =

The name Wati has been used for two tropical cyclones, both in the South Pacific Ocean:

- Cyclone Wati (2006) – approached and moved southeastward away from the east coast of Australia.
- Cyclone Wati (2026) – a Category 2 tropical cyclone that remained in the open ocean.
