= List of storms named Mona =

The name Mona has been used for three tropical cyclones: one in the East Pacific Ocean and two in the South Pacific Ocean.

In the East Pacific:

- Hurricane Mona (1963) – a Category 1 hurricane.

In the South Pacific:

- Cyclone Mona (2000) – a Category 3 severe tropical cyclone that affected Tonga.
- Cyclone Mona (2019) – a Category 2 tropical cyclone.

== See also ==
Storms with similar names

- Typhoon Monang (1993) – a Category 3-equivalent West Pacific typhoon internationally known as Typhoon Lola.
- Cyclone Montha (2025) – a North Indian Ocean severe cyclonic storm that indirectly caused the 2025 Nepal snowstorm disaster.
- Cyclone Mora (2017) – a North Indian Ocean severe cyclonic storm that worsened the 2017 Sri Lanka floods.
