= 2019–20 South Pacific cyclone season =

Tropical cyclone season

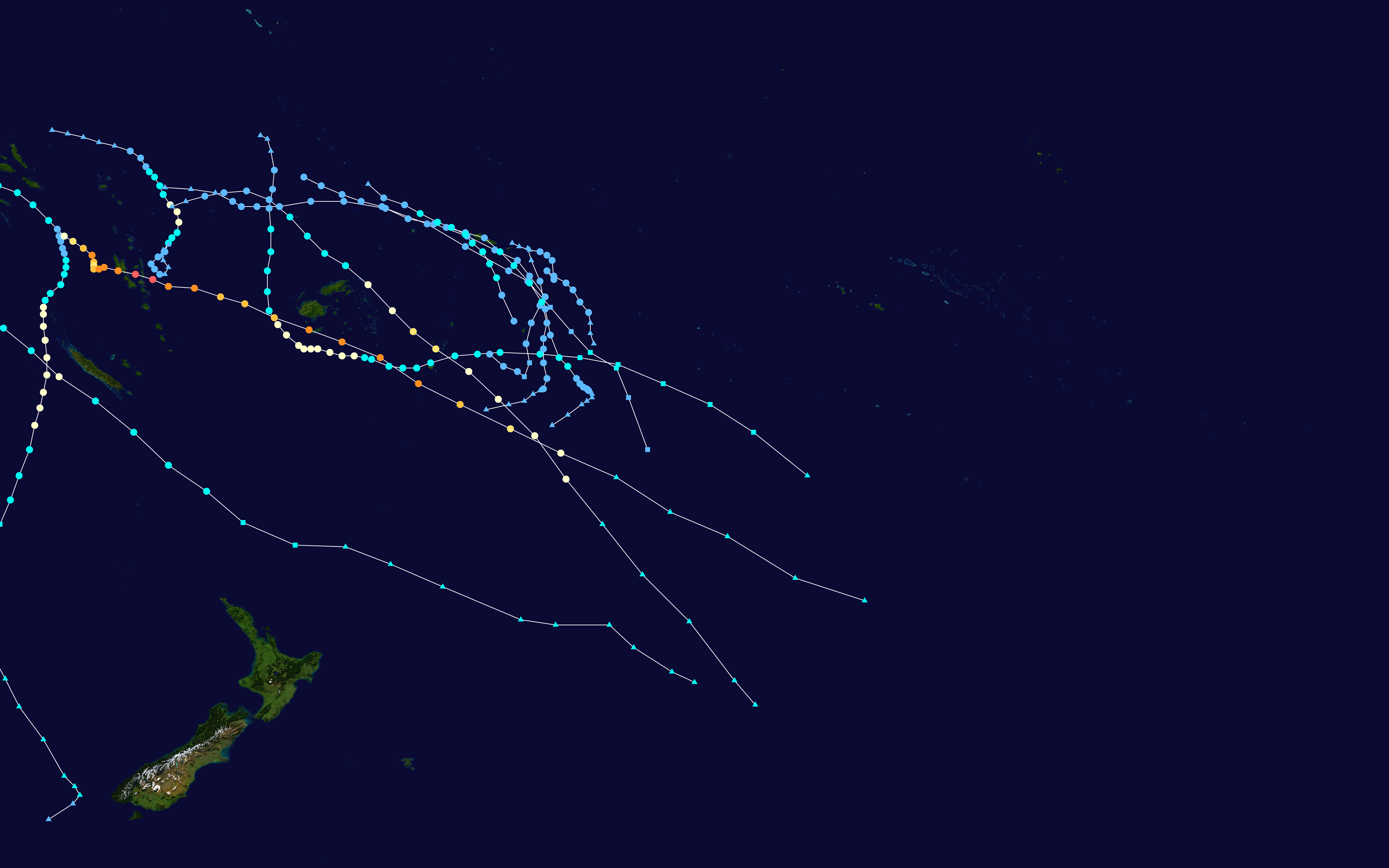
- Season summary map

Seasonal boundaries
- First system formed: November 22, 2019
- Last system dissipated: April 10, 2020

Strongest storm
- Name: Harold
  - Maximum winds: 230 km/h (145 mph) (10-minute sustained)
  - Lowest pressure: 920 hPa (mbar)

Seasonal statistics
- Total disturbances: 12
- Total depressions: 8
- Tropical cyclones: 8
- Severe tropical cyclones: 3
- Total fatalities: 5 total
- Total damage: > $131.63 million (2019 USD)

Related articles
- 2019–20 Australian region cyclone season; 2019–20 South-West Indian Ocean cyclone season

The 2019–20 South Pacific cyclone season was a slightly above-average season in which tropical cyclones formed within the South Pacific Ocean to the east of 160°E. The season officially ran from November 1, 2019, to April 30, 2020, however a tropical cyclone could form at any time between July 1, 2019, and June 30, 2020, and would count towards the season total. The season began on November 22 with the formation of Tropical Cyclone Rita, which would later become a severe tropical cyclone. The season has been near-average in terms of activity, with 8 tropical cyclones and 4 severe tropical cyclones forming during the season. The season featured Cyclone Harold, the first Category 5 severe tropical cyclone in the basin since Cyclone Gita, and one of the strongest since Cyclone Winston. During the season, tropical cyclones are officially monitored by the Fiji Meteorological Service (FMS), Australian Bureau of Meteorology (BOM) and New Zealand's MetService. The United States Armed Forces through the Joint Typhoon Warning Center (JTWC) also monitors the basin and issue unofficial warnings for American interests. The FMS attaches a number and an F suffix to tropical disturbances that form in or move into the basin while the JTWC designates significant tropical cyclones with a number and a P suffix. The FMS, BoM and MetService all use the Australian Tropical Cyclone Intensity Scale and estimate wind speeds over a period of ten minutes, while the JTWC estimated sustained winds over a 1-minute period, which are subsequently compared to the Saffir–Simpson hurricane wind scale (SSHWS).

== Seasonal forecasts ==
Source/Record	Tropical Cyclone	Severe Tropical Cyclone	Ref
Record high:	1997–98: 16	1982–83: 10	
Record low:	1990–91: 2	2008–09: 0	
Average (1969–70 – 2018–19):	7.1	—	
NIWA October	9–12	4	
Fiji Meteorological Service	5–8	2–4	

Ahead of the season officially starting on November 1, the Fiji Meteorological Service (FMS) and New Zealand's National Institute of Water and Atmospheric Research (NIWA), both issued a tropical cyclone outlook that discussed the upcoming season. These outlooks took into account a variety of factors such as what had happened in previous seasons. The Southwest Pacific tropical cyclone outlook issued by New Zealand's National Institute of Water and Atmospheric Research (NIWA) in conjunction with MetService and various other Pacific meteorological services, predicted that nine to twelve tropical cyclones would occur over the South Pacific Ocean between 135°E and 120°W. The outlook also predicted that at least four of these tropical cyclones would intensify further and become either a Category three, four or five severe tropical cyclone on the Australian tropical cyclone intensity scale. In addition to contributing towards the Southwest Pacific tropical cyclone outlook, the FMS predicted that between five and eight tropical cyclones would occur within the basin, while two to four of these tropical cyclones were expected to intensify further and become either a category three, four or five severe tropical cyclone on the Australian scale.

== Seasonal summary ==
The season began with the arrival of Tropical Depression 01F on November 22, near the Solomon Islands, which would later become Tropical Cyclone Rita. Rita would then peak as a Category 3 on the Australian scale. Tropical Disturbance 02F was designated sometime later, but didn't last long after that. Sarai formed on December 23, lasting into the new year before finally ceasing to exist on January 2. Not too long after that, Tino formed and affected eastern Fiji and the surrounding area before dissipating. On January 24, a depression formed and dissipated the next day without been named. In early February, another low originally in the Australian region crossed the 160th meridian east and emerged in the South Pacific. It strengthened into severe tropical cyclone Uesi and affected New Caledonia and New Zealand. In mid-February four disturbances formed, 07F, 08F, 09F and 10F. 07F & 08F dissipated before becoming tropical depressions but the other 2 strengthened into tropical cyclones Vicky and Wasi. In mid March, Gretel entered the basin. It dissipated shortly afterwards. In early April, Harold also entered the basin from the Australian region. It rapidly intensified into a Category 5 Severe tropical cyclone as it impacted Vanuatu.

== Systems ==
=== Tropical Cyclone Rita ===
- Category 2 tropical cyclone (Australian scale)
- Category 1 tropical cyclone (SSHWS)
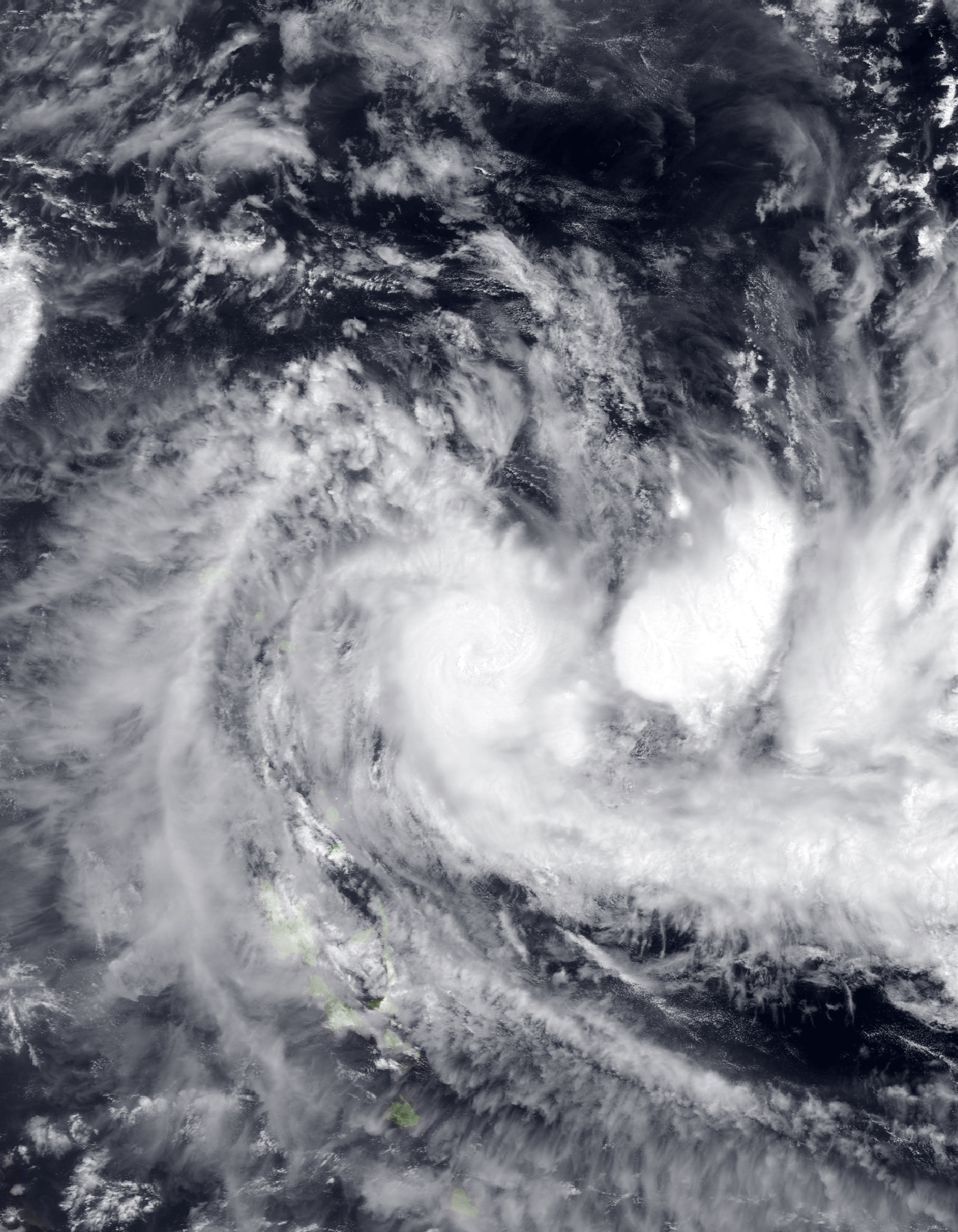
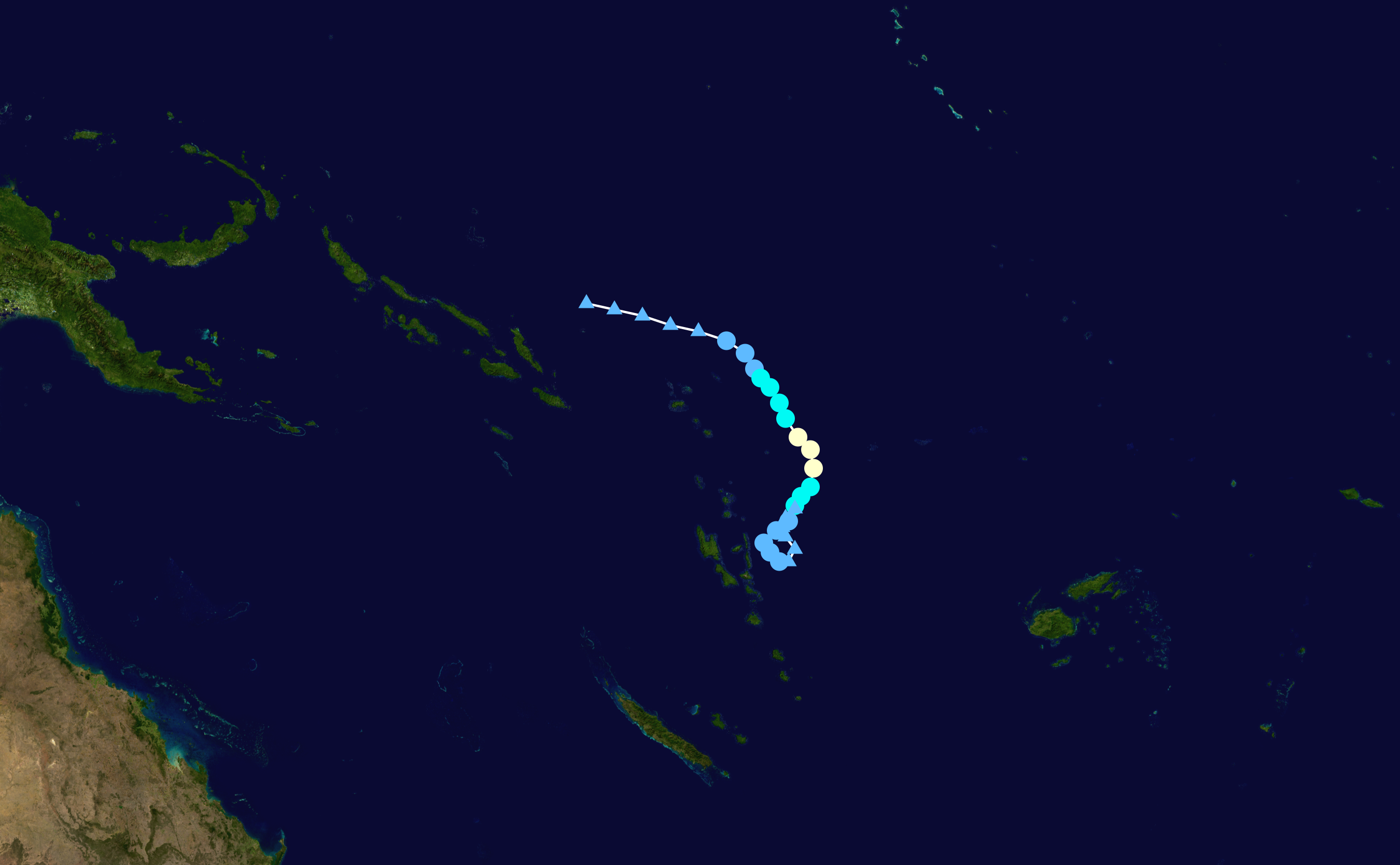
- Duration: November 22 – November 26
- Peak intensity: 110 km/h (70 mph) (10-min); 977 hPa (mbar)

Beginning November 21, the Fiji Meteorological Service (FMS) began highlighting the likelihood of a tropical cyclone forming between Vanuatu and Fiji. Showers and thunderstorms began to aggregate in the region atop sea surface temperatures above 29 °C (84 °F) in low-wind shear conditions. Imagery from microwave satellite data showed emergent rainbands wrapping towards an organising center of low pressure. Late on November 22, the FMS designated the system, now east of the Solomon Islands, as Tropical Disturbance 01F. The slow-moving disturbance tracked towards the south and southeast, steered by a broad area of high pressure. On November 23, 01F attained tropical depression status. Supported by the stout outflow of air at the upper-levels of the troposphere, shower activity became more concentrated around the center of circulation. The depression reached tropical cyclone intensity by 06:00 UTC on November 24 near the Santa Cruz Islands, earning the name Rita. A well-defined and formative eye soon developed beneath the central cloud cover. Continuing to intensify in favorable atmospheric conditions, Rita reached Category 2 cyclone strength by November 25, and later will peak with 70 mph per FMS. The developing eye briefly emerged on infrared and visible satellite imagery as a ragged feature at the cyclone's center, surrounded by well-defined rainbands.

Over the course of November 25, convective activity and organization slightly diminished due to an increase in wind shear, and Rita ultimately peaked as a Category 3 tropical cyclone with 10-minute maximum sustained winds of 120 km/h (75 mph) as well as 1-minute sustained winds up to the same intensity. Additionally, Rita reached a minimum barometric pressure of 977 mbar (hPa; 28.85 inHg). This made Rita one of the strongest first storms to form in the South Pacific since the formation of Mick in 2009, as many others were merely depressions or disturbances. It then began to track into an area unfavorable for intensification due to the presence of wind shear and cool dry air, resulting in a rapid decay of the storm's convection and a decrease of the storm's maximum winds. The FMS issued their last advisory on Rita on November 26 after the storm was downgraded to a remnant area of low pressure; at the time these remnants were slowly moving west-southwest towards northern Vanuatu.

In anticipation of heavy rainfall and strong winds from Rita, the National Disaster Management Office in Port Vila, Vanuatu, issued a Red Alert for Torba Province and a Yellow Alert for Penama Province and Sanma Province. Warnings for strong winds were also issued for Shefa and Tafea provinces.

=== Tropical Disturbance 02F ===
- Tropical disturbance (Australian scale)
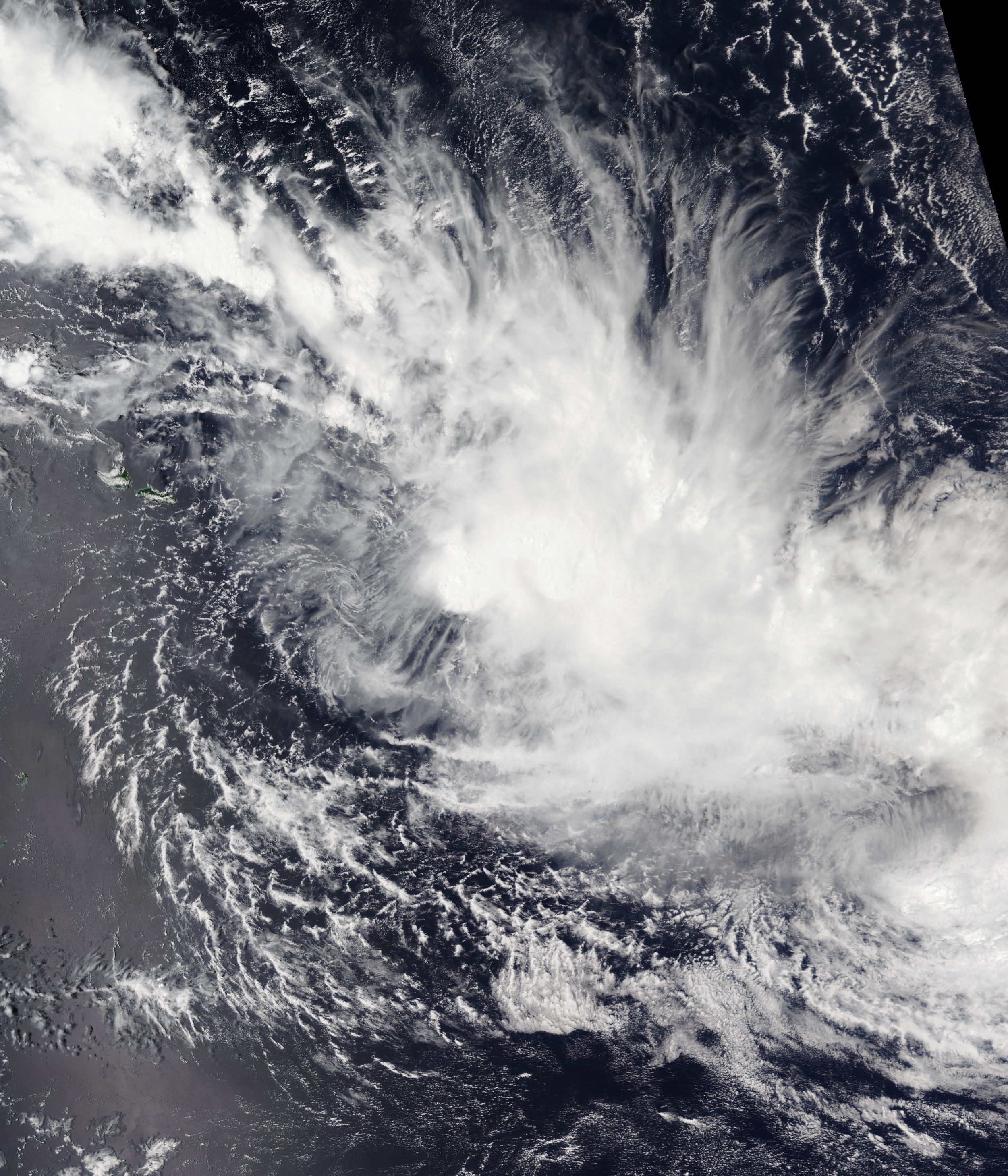
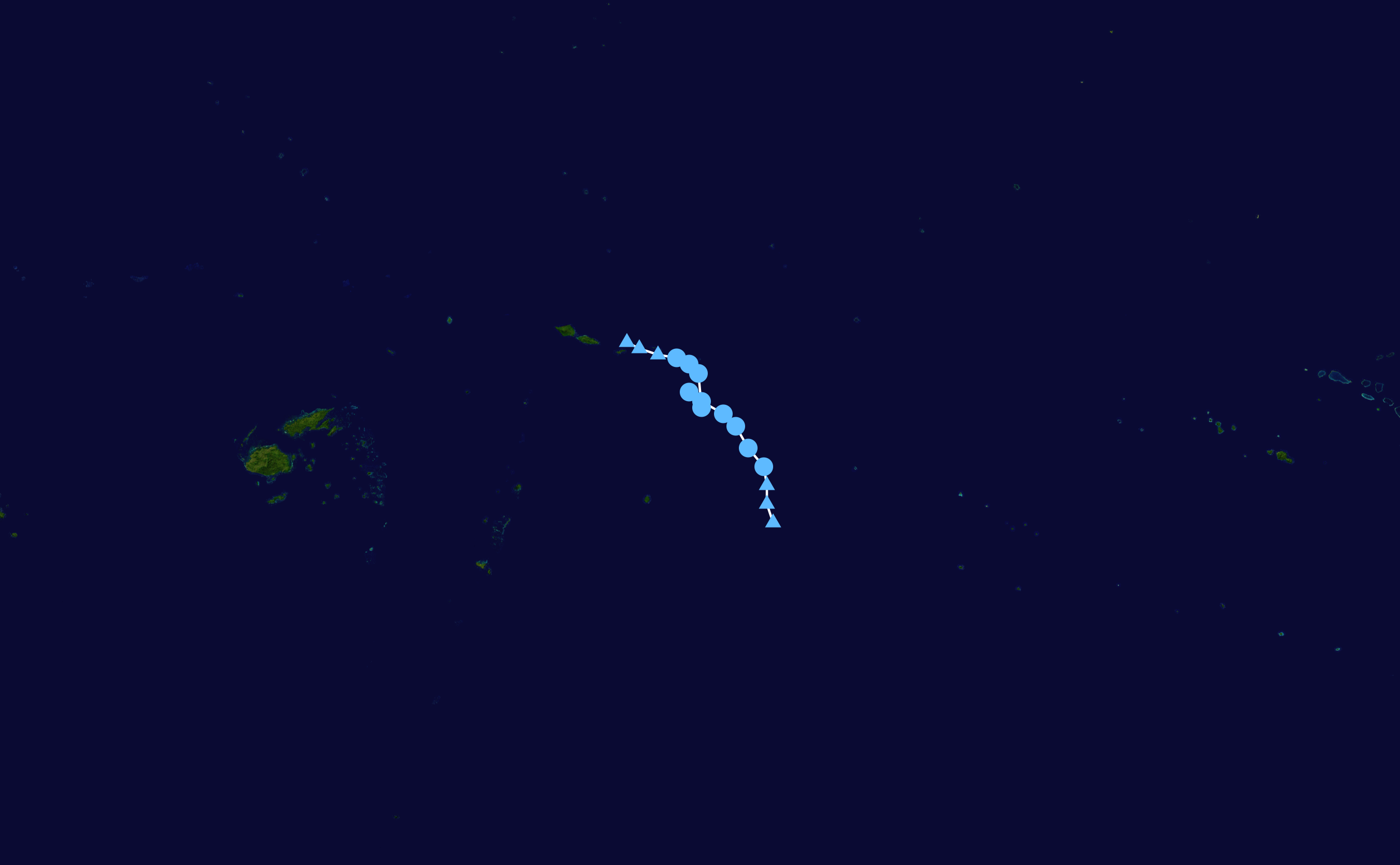
- Duration: December 19 – December 23
- Peak intensity: Winds not specified; 999 hPa (mbar)

During December 19, the FMS reported that Tropical Disturbance 02F had developed about 55 km (35 mi) to the northeast of Tau in American Samoa's Manu‘a Group. At this time, the system was poorly organised with atmospheric convection located to the east of the storms low level circulation center. Over the next few days, the system moved south-westwards within an area that was marginally favourable for further development, with good poleward outflow and warm sea surface temperatures offset by low to moderate vertical wind shear. However, it failed to develop any further and was last noted by the FMS during December 23, after it had lost its tropical characteristics and became extratropical.

=== Tropical Cyclone Sarai ===
- Category 2 tropical cyclone (Australian scale)
- Category 1 tropical cyclone (SSHWS)
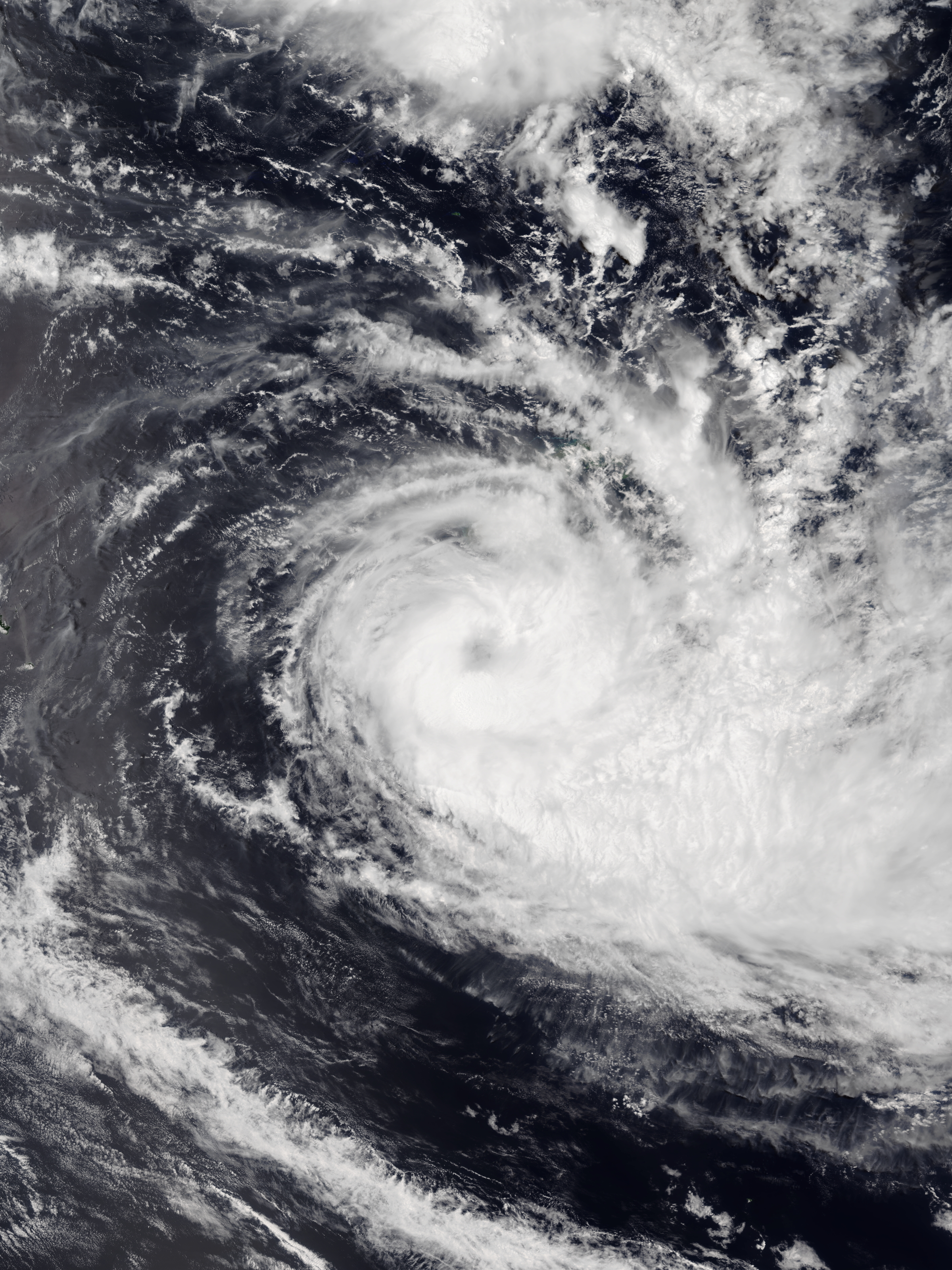
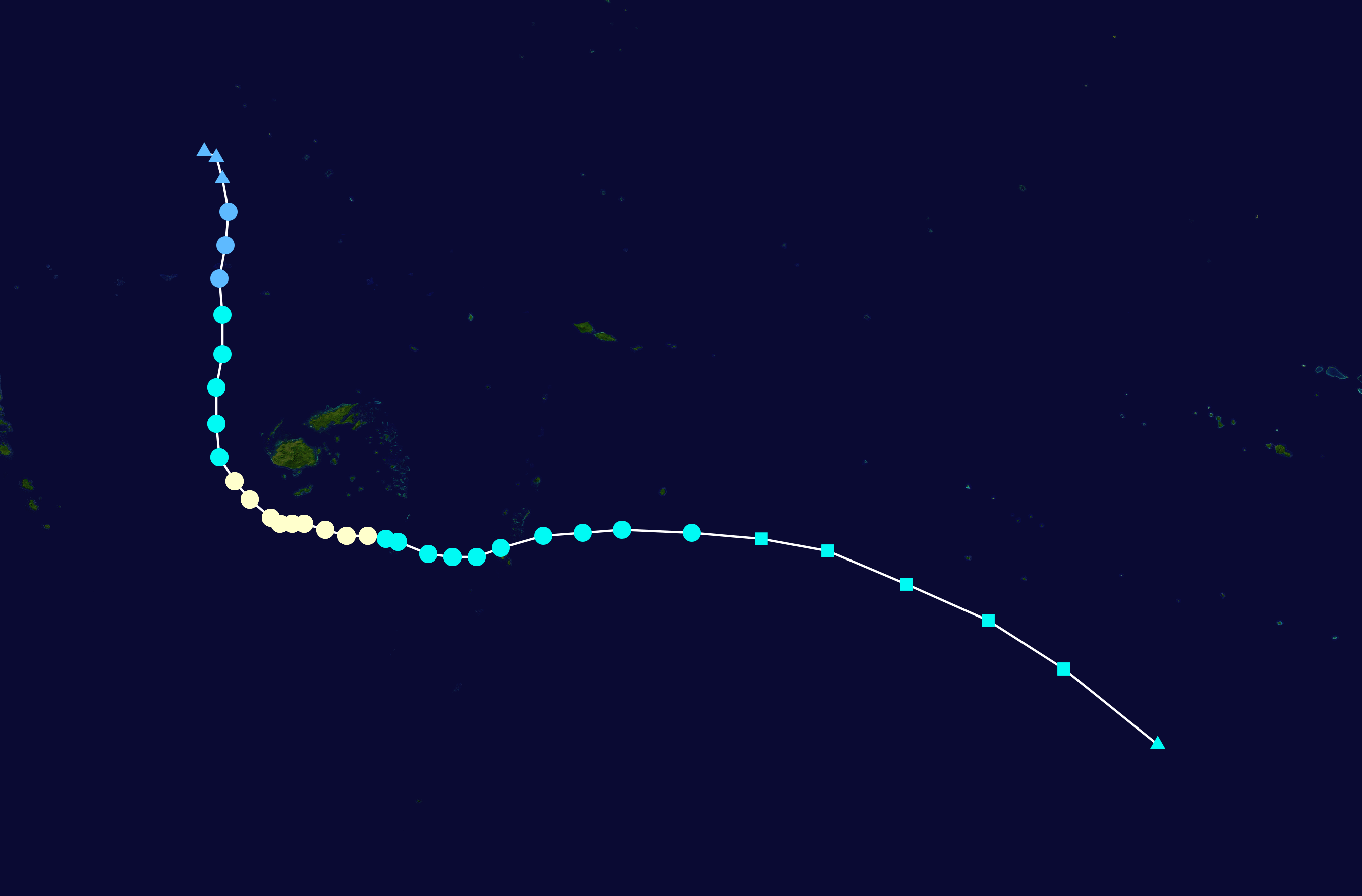
- Duration: December 23 – January 2
- Peak intensity: 110 km/h (70 mph) (10-min); 972 hPa (mbar)

During December 23, the FMS reported that Tropical Disturbance 03F had developed about 630 km (390 mi) to the west of Tuvalu. At this time the system was poorly organised with deep atmospheric convection, displaced to the north and east of its broad and elongated low-level circulation. The disturbance was also located underneath an upper ridge of high pressure within a favourable environment for further development, with low to moderate vertical windshear and warm sea surface temperatures of 29–30 °C (84–86 °F). Over the next couple of days, the system moved southwards and gradually developed further with its overall organisation improving, before it was classified as a tropical depression by the FMS during December 25. After being classified as a tropical depression, the system continued to develop, with its outflow improving and deep convection wrapping on to the systems low level circulation center. During December 26, the JTWC initiated advisories on the depression and designated it as Tropical Cyclone 04P, before the FMS reported that the system had become a Category 1 tropical cyclone and named it Sarai. At this time, Sarai was being steered southwards to the west of Fiji, along the edge of a near-equatorial ridge of high pressure and the jetstream. Over the next couple of days, the system gradually intensified further and was classified as a Category 2 tropical cyclone during December 27, while it was located around 220 km (135 mi) to the west of Nadi, Fiji. During December 28, as Sarai passed about 100 km (60 mi) to the south of Fiji's Kadavu Island, the FMS estimated that the system had peaked as a Category 2 tropical cyclone with 10-minute sustained winds of 110 km/h (68 mph).

Due to an area of high pressure to its east, Sarai took a southerly course during its early stages as a named system. The high pressure region would later shift its orientation, causing Sarai to gradually curve towards the east. On December 27, the cyclone's winds increased further past Category 2 cyclone thresholds, with one-minute sustained winds to hurricane-force. The following day, the FMS assessed a peak intensity with ten-minute sustained winds of 110 km/h (68 mph). At the time, a large eye was evident on microwave satellite data while the storm tracked towards the southeast along the periphery of the jet stream, and remained present throughout the day. Sarai reached its lowest barometric pressure on December 29 before weakening due to increasing wind shear of 55–65 km/h (34–40 mph), resulting in a loss of organisation. Sarai's center of circulation became displaced from the storm's convection on December 30, and the storm weakened to Category 1 strength. Its center tracked near Nukuʻalofa on December 31 while the storm's structure rapidly deteriorated, with the JTWC issuing their final advisory that day. The FMS continued monitoring the system as an ex-cyclone as the storm accelerated eastward, highlighting a low possibility for regeneration; the agency ultimately issued their final bulletin on the system on January 2.

As the cyclone passed very close to the main Fijian island of Viti Levu on December 27 and brought very heavy rainfall, the FMS warned of the probability of damaging gale-force and storm-force winds and very heavy rainfall at times, with over 2,000 people being evacuated to higher grounds in case of flooding, while commercial flights and cruises in and out of the country were delayed or cancelled as a result of these conditions. Additionally, as of December 29, 2019, 2 deaths have been confirmed related to the cyclone due to drowning in floodwaters. Damage to road infrastructure reached FJ$5 million (US$2.3 million).

=== Severe Tropical Cyclone Tino ===
- Category 3 severe tropical cyclone (Australian scale)
- Category 2 tropical cyclone (SSHWS)
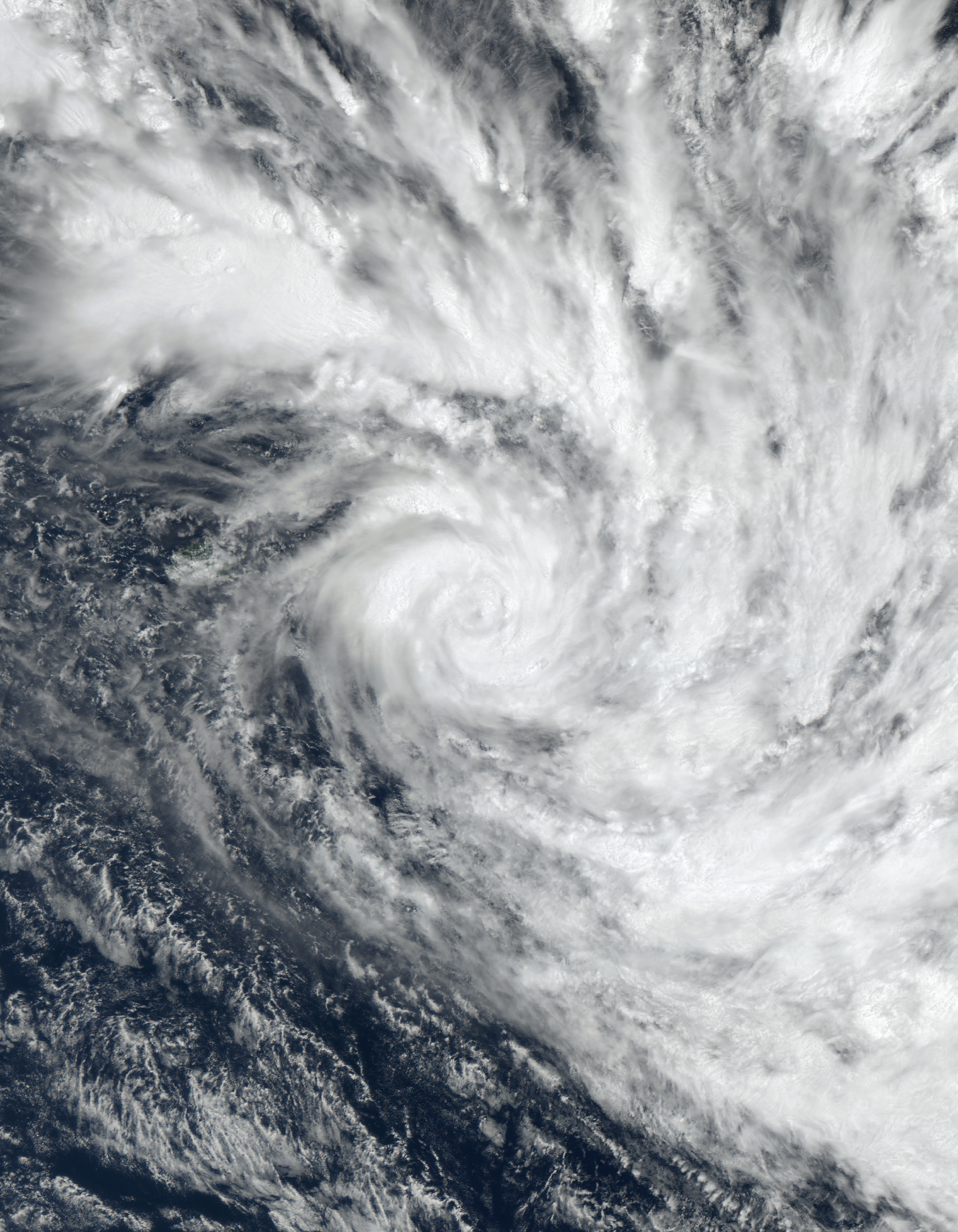
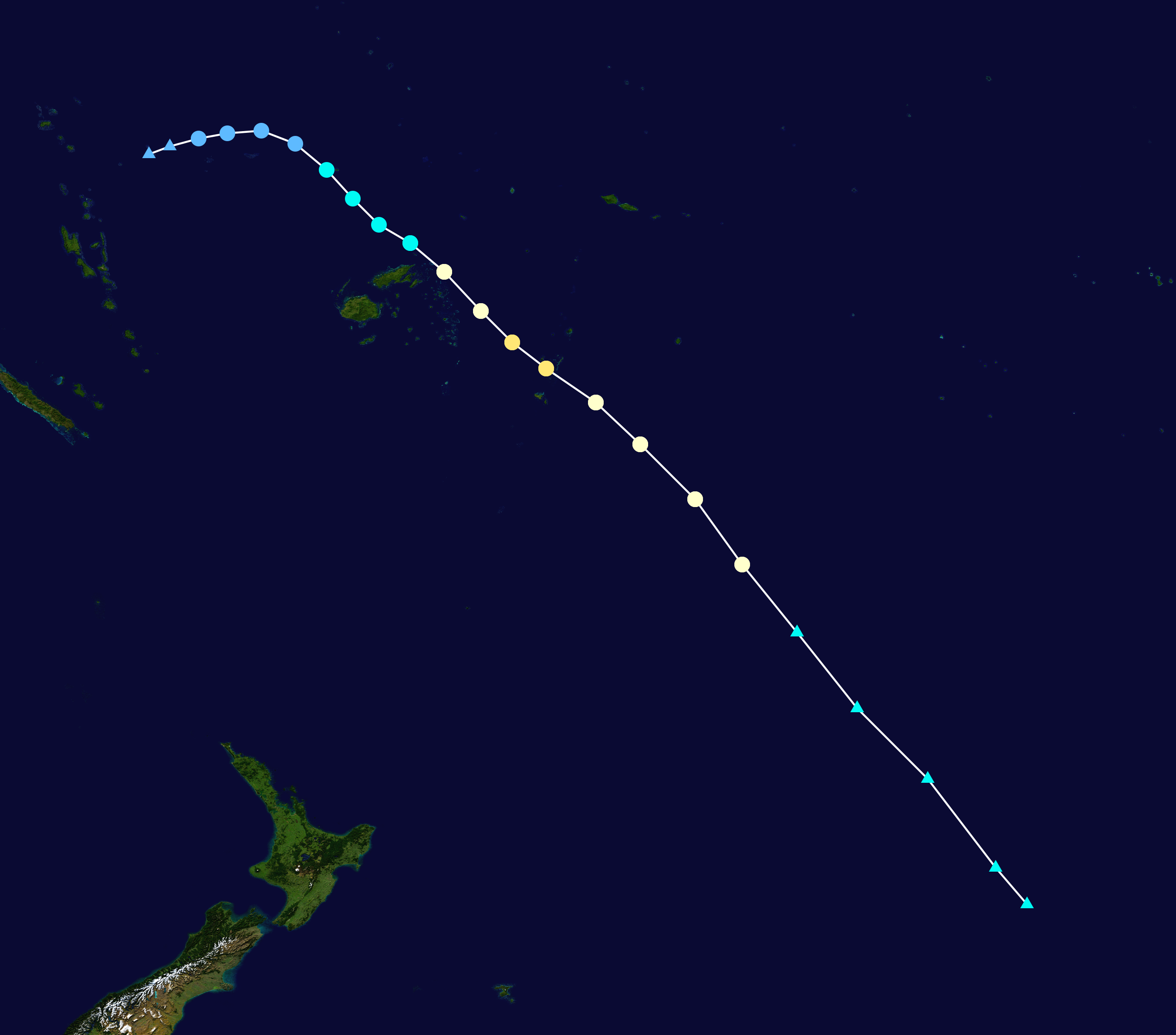
- Duration: January 11 – January 19
- Peak intensity: 120 km/h (75 mph) (10-min); 970 hPa (mbar)

On January 10, an area of low pressure formed just east of the Solomon Islands and was forecast by the FMS to track towards the southeast, exhibiting some potential to develop further into a tropical cyclone. The FMS designated the slow-moving complex of deep convection as Tropical Disturbance 04F on January 11; at the time, the disturbance was located within a moderate wind shear environment near Makira atop 31 °C (88 °F) ocean waters. Deep convection continued to accompany the developing wind circulation over the following days as conditions grew more favourable, though the wind field remained broad and disorganised. The FMS began issuing advisories on 04F on January 14 following improvements in the disturbance's organisation. A subtropical ridge to the northeast caused 04F to track towards the east and southeast. Throughout the early part of the storm's development, a strong band of convection persisted north of the centre of circulation. Following a decrease in wind shear, the FMS upgraded 04F to a tropical depression on January 15 as it began to organize. Further intensification occurred as additional convection wrapped around the storm's centre on January 16, prompting the FMS to upgrade the system to a Category 1 tropical cyclone, giving the storm the name Tino. The next day, the storm passed near Vanua Levu and strengthened further into a Category 2 cyclone as an emerged; Category 3 intensity was reached later that day with 10-minute sustained winds estimated at 120 km/h (75 mph). However, Tino soon began to entrain dry air, resulting in a gradual decay of its convection and subsequent weakening on January 18 as the center tracked across Ha'apai. Interaction with a baroclinic zone the next day signaled the onset of extratropical transition; Tino fully completed this processes later on January 19.

Warnings for heavy rain were issued for all of the Solomon Islands and four Vanuatuan provinces by their respective National Meteorological and Hydrological Services. Similarly, a Heavy Rain Alert was issued by the FMS on January 14 for western parts of Fiji, upgraded to the whole of Fiji by 17 January. A Tropical Cyclone Warning was subsequently issued for Rotuma on January 15, and a Tropical Cyclone Alert for the rest of the Fijian islands. Fijians were advised by the Water Authority of Fiji to boil and store drinking water in anticipation of the approaching tropical cyclone. Cruises in the area began to be cancelled on January 14. Evacuation centres were opened on January 16 in Fiji's Northern Division, as well as the division's Emergency Operations Centre. Villagers in the Udu Point region of Vanua Levu were urged to move inland due to rough forecast seas. The Labasa campus of the Fiji National University closed on January 17.

As Tino passed close to Vanua Levu, the second cyclone to pass near the nation within three weeks following Sarai, Fijian government officials called for urgent action on the 'climate crisis' in the South Pacific region. Additionally, a father and daughter were left missing after being swept away from floodwaters due to heavy rainfall generated by the system in Eastern Fiji.

=== Tropical Disturbance 05F ===
- Tropical disturbance (Australian scale)
- Tropical storm (SSHWS)
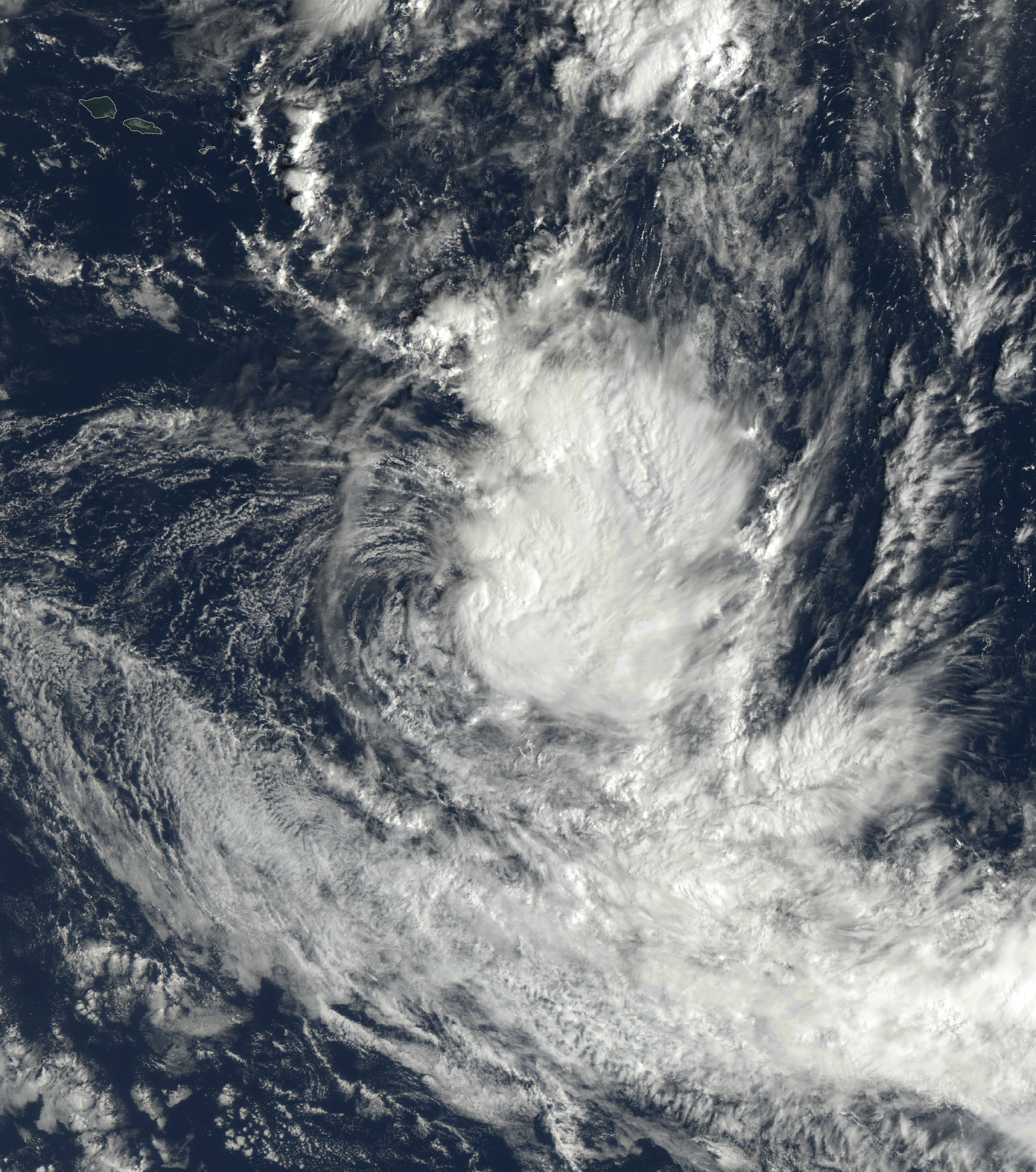
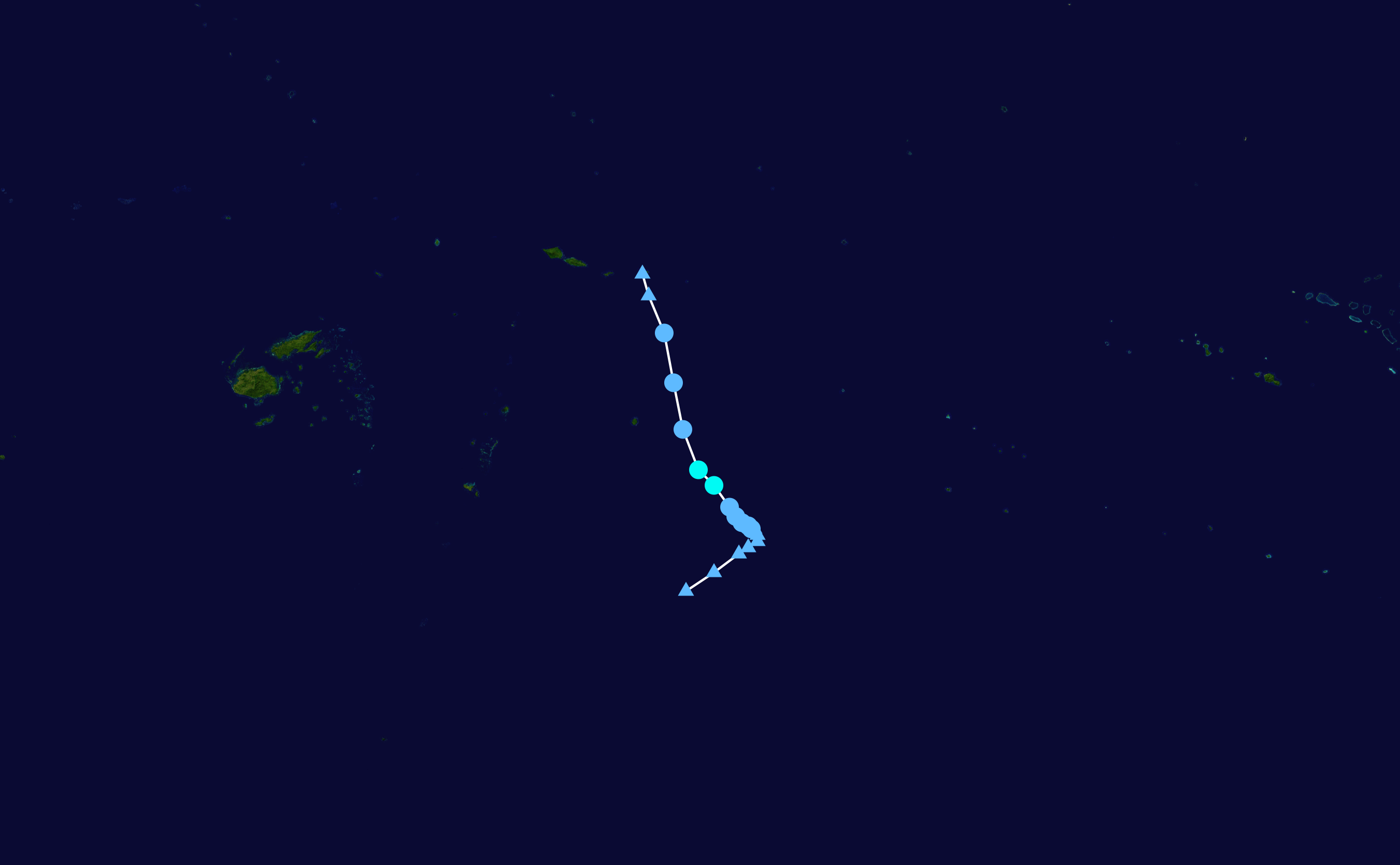
- Duration: January 24 – January 26
- Peak intensity: 65 km/h (40 mph) (1-min); 1003 hPa (mbar)

During January 24, the FMS reported that Tropical Disturbance 05F had developed about 75 km (45 mi) to the northwest of Pago-Pago in American Samoa. At this time, the disturbance was poorly organised with atmospheric convection located to the north of its low-level circulation center. During that day, the disturbance moved south-eastwards within an environment favourable for further development, with low vertical windshear, warm sea surface temperatures, while its outflow was enhanced by strong westerlies. As a result, atmospheric convection started to wrap into the system's consolidating low-level circulation center, which prompted the JTWC to issue a tropical cyclone formation alert on the disturbance. During the next day, the JTWC initiated advisories on the disturbance and designated it as Tropical Cyclone 12P, as the system peaked with 1-minute sustained windspeeds of 65 km/h (40 mph). The system subsequently moved south-eastwards into an area of moderate vertical wind shear, while atmospheric convection became sheared and located to the northeast of the disturbance's exposed low-level circulation centre. As a result, the FMS issued their final warning on the disturbance, as it was expected to move further south into an area of high vertical wind shear. During January 26, the JTWC subsequently issued their final warning on the system after it had dissipated.

=== Severe Tropical Cyclone Uesi ===
- Category 3 severe tropical cyclone (Australian scale)
- Category 1 tropical cyclone (SSHWS)
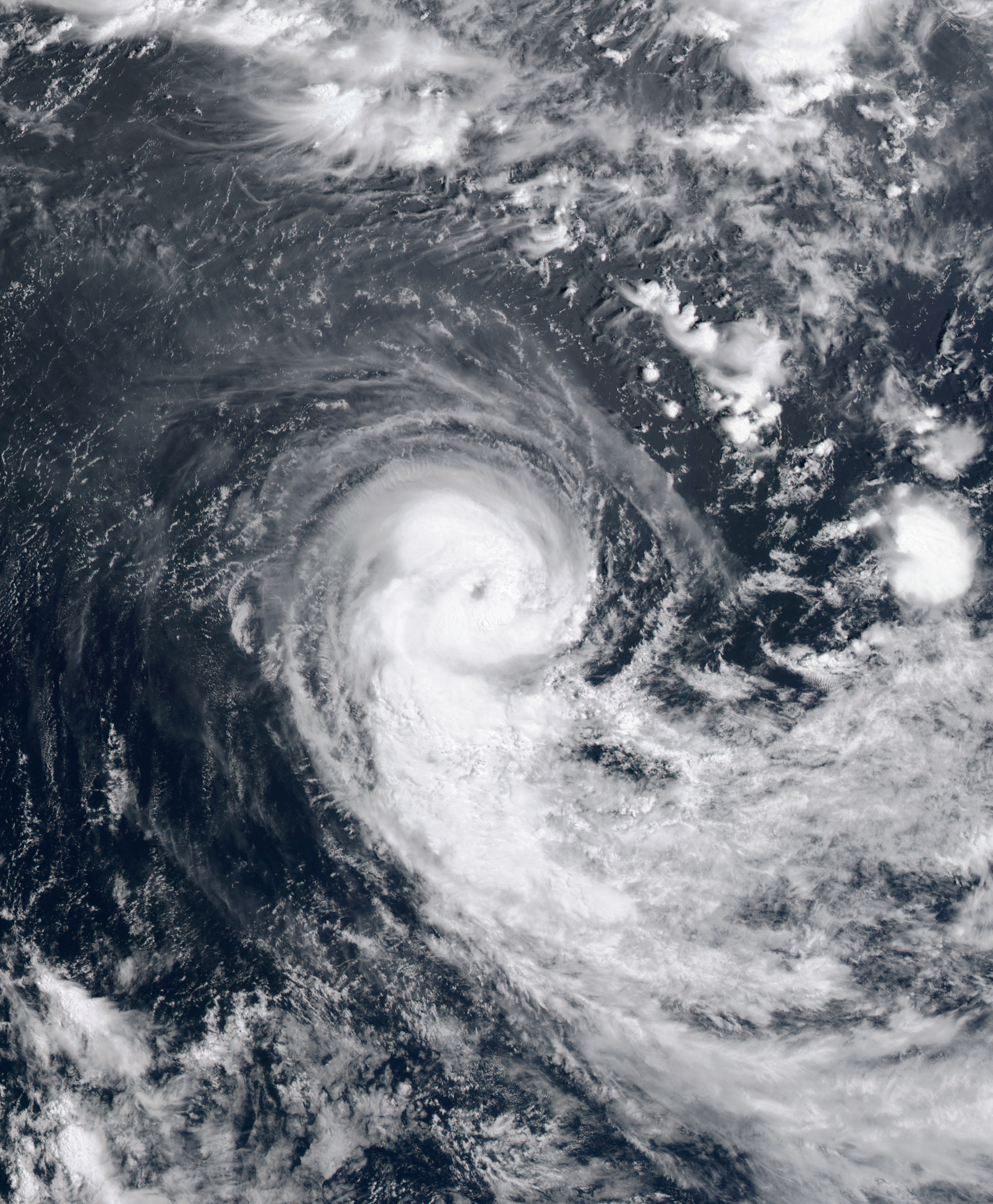
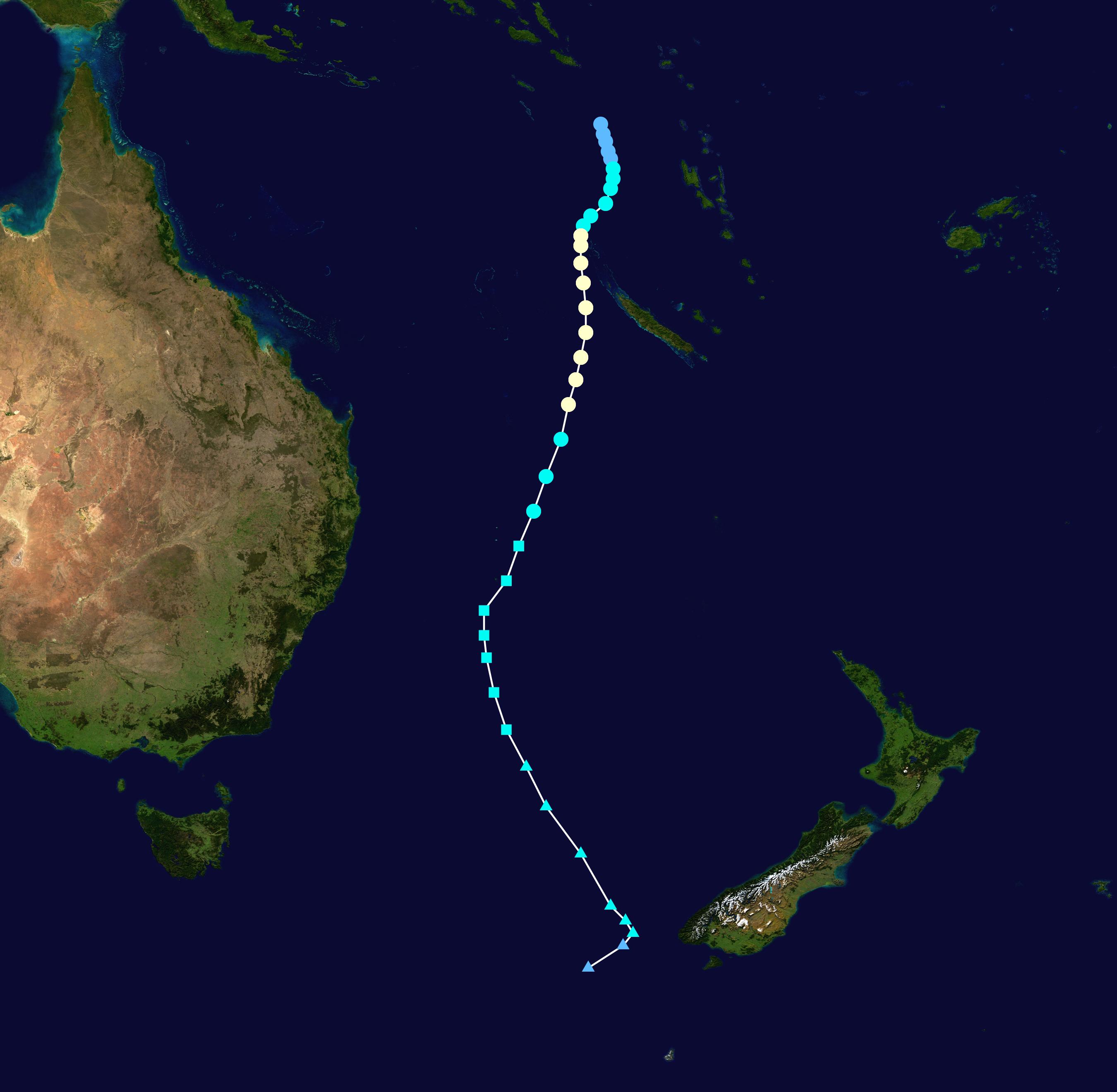
- Duration: February 5 – February 13 (Exited basin)
- Peak intensity: 130 km/h (80 mph) (10-min); 975 hPa (mbar)

During February 5, the FMS reported that Tropical Disturbance 06F had developed, about 775 km (480 mi) to the northwest of Port Vila in Vanuatu. At this time the system was poorly organised with deep atmospheric convection displaced to the northeast of the system's weak and ill-defined low level circulation center. The disturbance was also located to the north of a subtropical ridge of high pressure, within a favourable environment for further development, with a low to moderate amount of vertical wind shear and warm sea surface temperatures of 29–30 °C (84–86 °F). A tropical cyclone formation alert was subsequently issued by the JTWC early on February 8, as convection improved near the centre of the storm; at the time, 06F was centered 653 km (406 mi) northwest of Port Vila, Vanuatu. Routine advisories were initiated by the FMS the same day while 06F drifted towards the south-southwest. Convection continued to evolve at the disturbance's centre into organised banding. During February 9, the JTWC upgraded the system to a tropical storm, designating it Tropical Cyclone 15P. Later that day, the FMS named the storm Uesi, and upgraded it to a category 2 tropical cyclone.

Based on significant improvements to the storm's structure, the JTWC determined Uesi was undergoing rapid intensification. Associated showers and thunderstorms continued to coalesce within favourable atmospheric and oceanic conditions. However, the presence of dry air slowed Uesi's intensification. Uesi strengthened further into a Category 3 tropical cyclone at 18:00 UTC that day but continued to be affected by the entrainment of dry air. The cyclone developed a ragged eye 19 km (12 mi) early on February 11. Guided southward by the nearby influence of a subtropical ridge to its east, Uesi moved southward, passing west of New Caledonia. An increase in vertical wind shear from the northwest on February 12 caused the convective structure of the cyclone to weaken, resulting in the low-level circulation centre becoming exposed from the central dense overcast. After passing near to New Caledonia on February 11, Uesi adopted a steady south-southwestwards track towards the Australian cyclone region. At 12:00 UTC on February 12, the FMS passed primary responsibility for Uesi over to the Australian Bureau of Meteorology's (BOM) warning centre in Brisbane, who indicated that the system had weakened to a high-end Category 2 tropical cyclone. The extratropical remnants of Uesi reentered the South Pacific basin on a southeasterly heading towards South Island on February 15.

Vanuatu and the French territory of New Caledonia were threatened by Uesi along its southward trek through the South Pacific basin. Warnings were issued by the Vanuatu Meteorology and Geohazards Department for Uesi, noting the possibility of stream and coastal flooding. Météo France (MFR) issued thunderstorm and rain warnings for four municipalities in New Caledonia on February 9, and later raised warnings to an orange alert for six the following day. Ferry and bus services in several New Caledonian communes were suspended. Flights serviced by Air Calédonie were also delayed. The first accommodation centers in the French territory were opened on February 10. One person was injured while securing their roof in preparation for the storm. Uesi passed between 100–150 km (62–93 mi) west of Belep, New Caledonia, on February 11, bringing heavy rains and strong winds. MFR stations recorded up to 300 mm (12 in) of rainfall in Poum over a 48-hour period; this was roughly equal to two months of average rainfall. Flooding from Uesi's rainfall blocked travel between Poum and Koumac, as well as other bridges throughout the territory. Several routes to Dumbéa were blocked by floodwaters. Gusts of up to 120 km/h (75 mph) impacted New Caledonia's central mountain range. Power outages afflicted at least 3,900 households serviced by EEC and Enercal and over 5,000 overall. At least 565 homes lost power in Hienghène and Ponérihouen. All warnings for New Caledonia were lifted by the morning of February 12. Rough surf generated by Uesi forced the closure of beaches in Gold Coast, Queensland beginning that day. The large extratropical stage of Uesi produced 6–8 m (20–26 ft) waves off the northwestern shores of South Island.

=== Tropical Disturbance 07F ===
- Tropical disturbance (Australian scale)
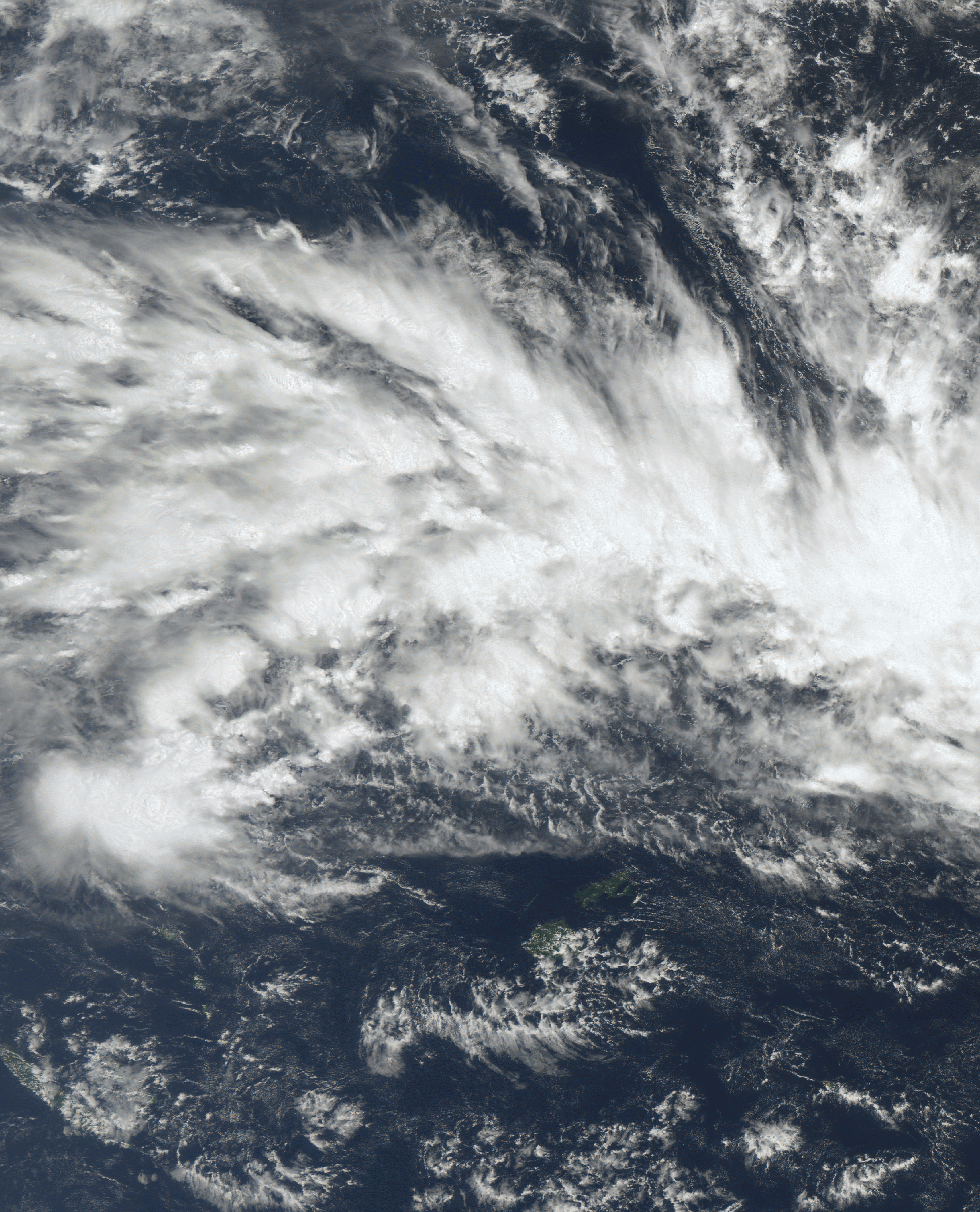
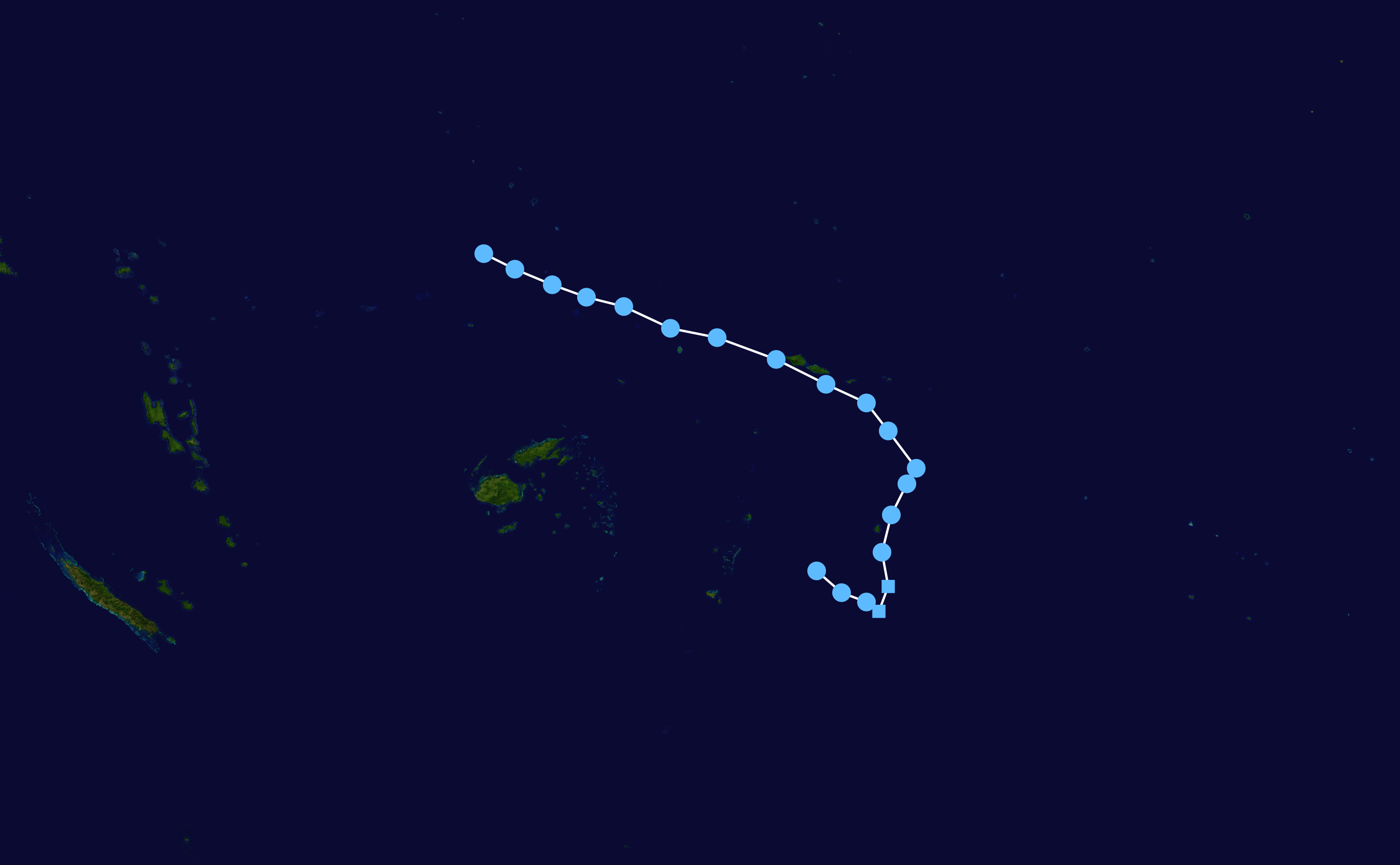
- Duration: February 14 – February 21
- Peak intensity: Winds not specified; 998 hPa (mbar)

During February 14, the FMS reported that Tropical Disturbance 07F had developed, about 490 km (305 mi) to the northeast of Funafuti in Tuvalu. The disturbance developed within a broad trough formed by a complex interaction between an amplified South Pacific convergence zone, a monsoon trough and a westerly wind burst in the region. Despite lacking a clear wind circulation within a chaotic environment—the JTWC initially considered the disturbance to be a hybrid system rather than a tropical cyclone—the region's warm sea surface temperatures and low wind shear were supportive of further organisation. However, development was slow and convection remained displaced from the center of circulation three days later. After an extended period of slow movement, 07F accelerated south of Samoa on February 19. Over the following days, the system tracked towards the east-southeast with little development. 07F turned towards the southwest by February 20, where strong wind shear began to degrade the convective structure of the system. The FMS issued the final advisory on the system on February 21 while it was passing to the south of Niue.

The U.S. Federal Emergency Management Agency sent seven representatives to American Samoa in advance of the disturbance. Before 07F's arrival, a moisture-laden convergence zone had already been affecting Samoa with heavy rainfall and high winds. Warnings from the Samoa Meteorology Service for rain, wind, and flooding were in effect for Savai'i and Upolu, resulting in cancellations of ferry services. While the threat of both 07F and nearby 08F lessened on February 18, warnings remained posted due to the persistence of the active convergence zone. The Ministry of Education Sports and Culture closed schools between February 18–19 in response to the inclement conditions. Roads in three villages in Apia were flooded by rains associated with 07F. Power outages affected Tutuila in American Samoa, where airports closed as the storm passed. Further southeast, in the Cook Islands, a civil defense emergency was declared. All schools were closed in Rarotonga. Large waves along the island's coast forced the closure of the seawall road.

=== Tropical Disturbance 08F ===
- Tropical disturbance (Australian scale)
- Subtropical storm (SSHWS)
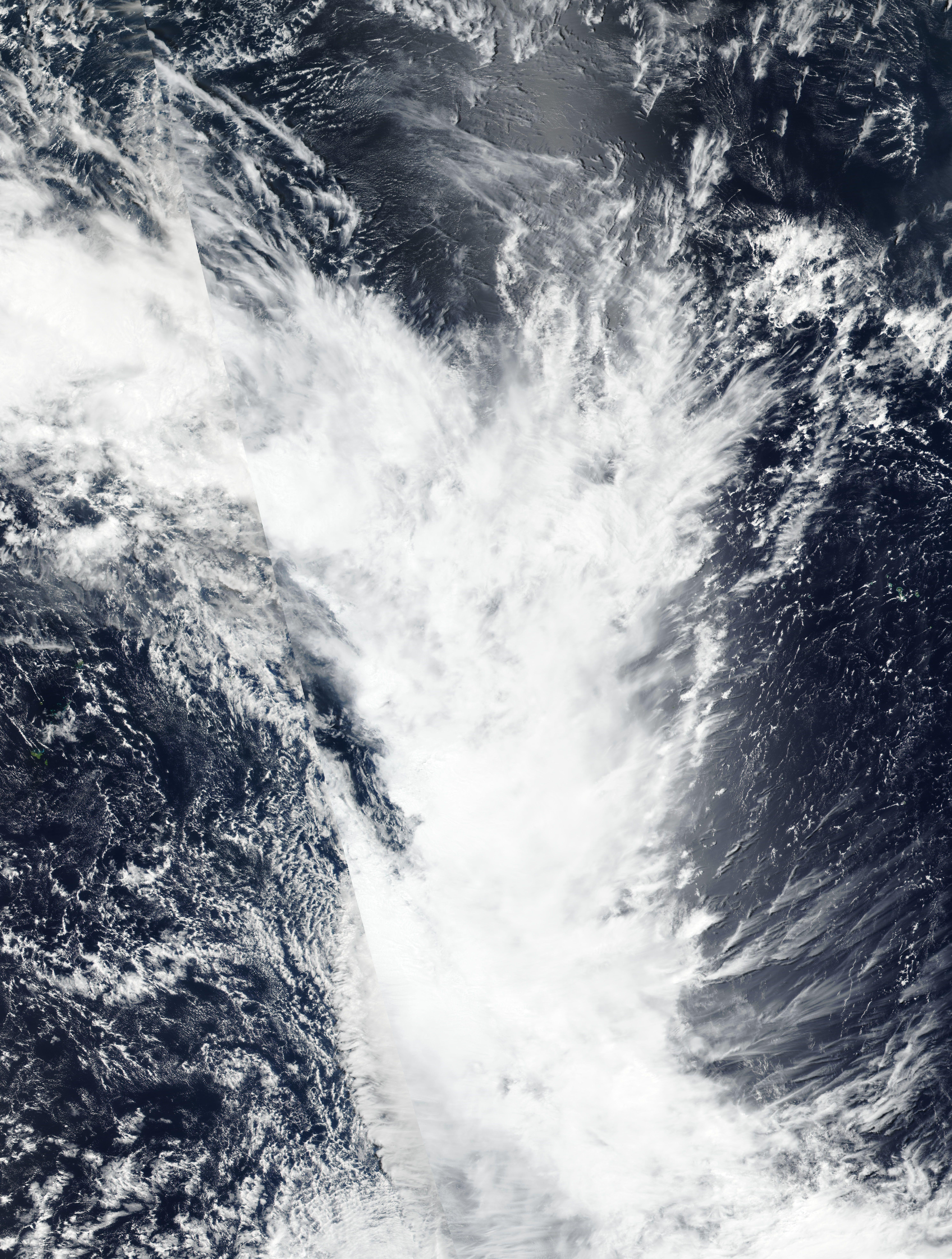
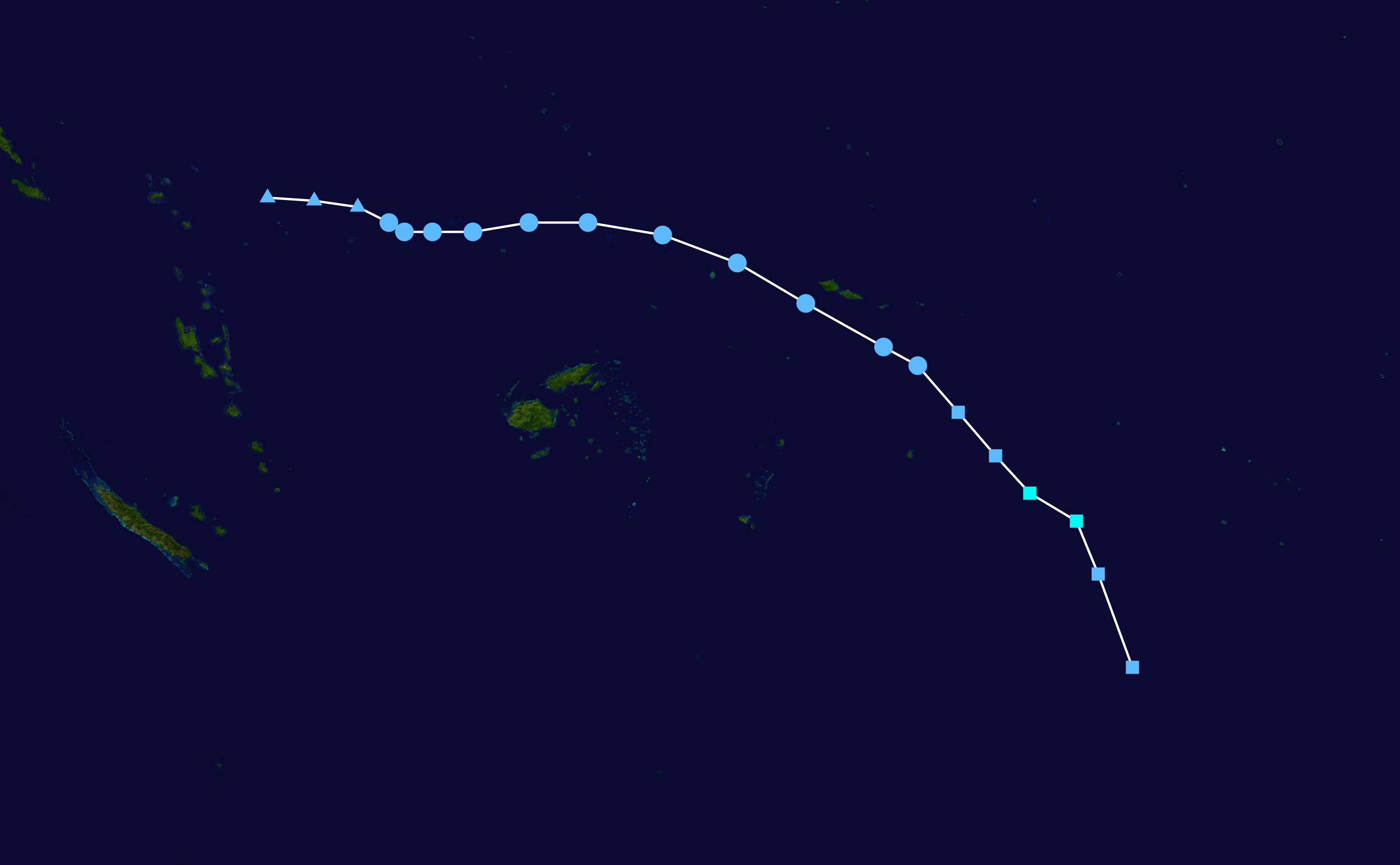
- Duration: February 16 – February 18
- Peak intensity: 65 km/h (40 mph) (1-min); 994 hPa (mbar)

On February 17, the FMS noted the formation of Tropical Disturbance 08F between American Samoa and Niue. The system was poorly organised, with a high wind shear environment displacing convection to the northeast of the low-level center of circulation as the disturbance moved southeast to east-southeast. The JTWC considered the disheveled cyclone as subtropical in nature, remaining in an environment hostile to increased organisation. By February 18, the JTWC declared the disturbance to have dissipated. Later that day, the center of 08F continued past the 25th parallel south, leading the FMS to issue their final tropical disturbance summary on the highly sheared system.

=== Tropical Cyclone Vicky ===
- Category 1 tropical cyclone (Australian scale)
- Tropical storm (SSHWS)
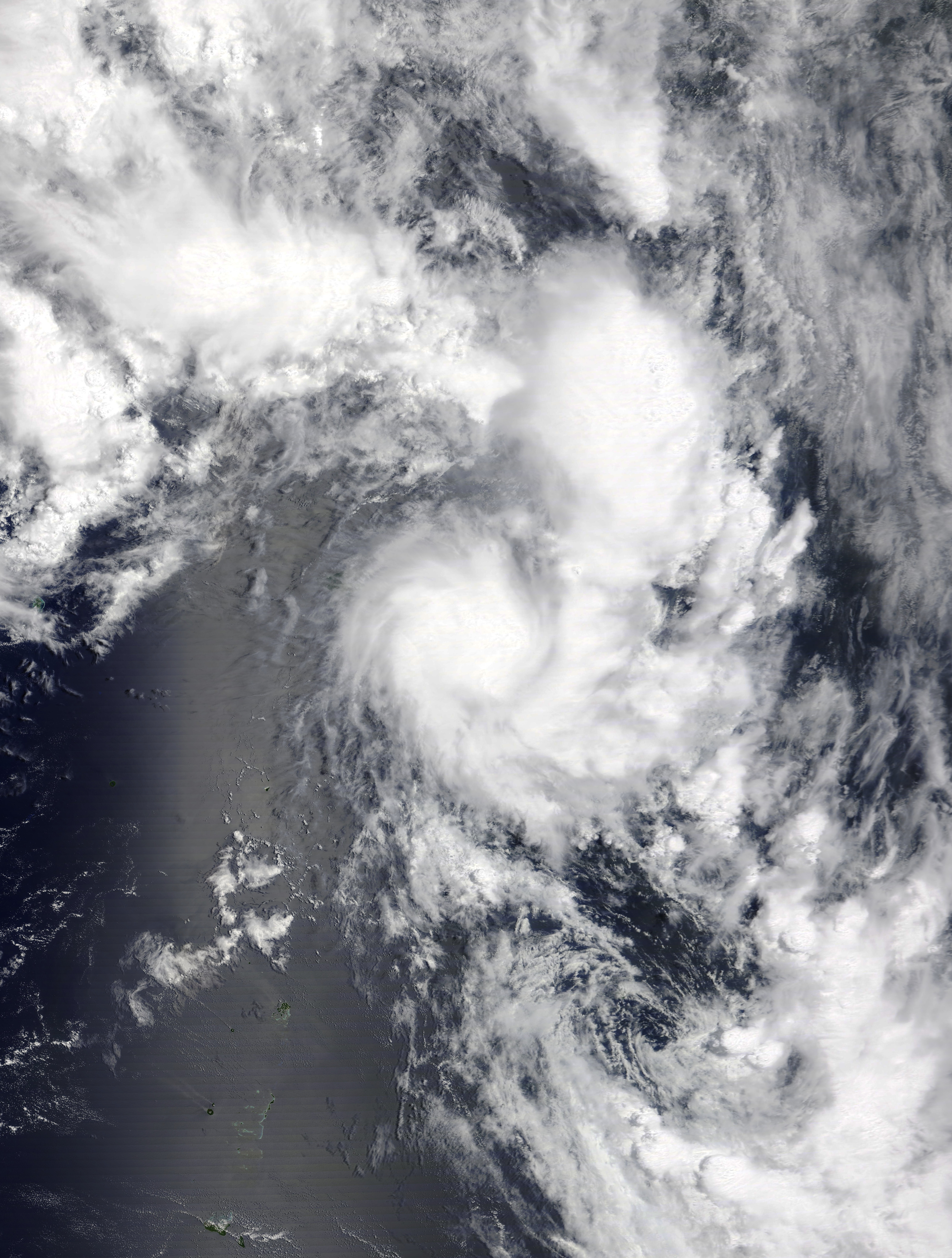
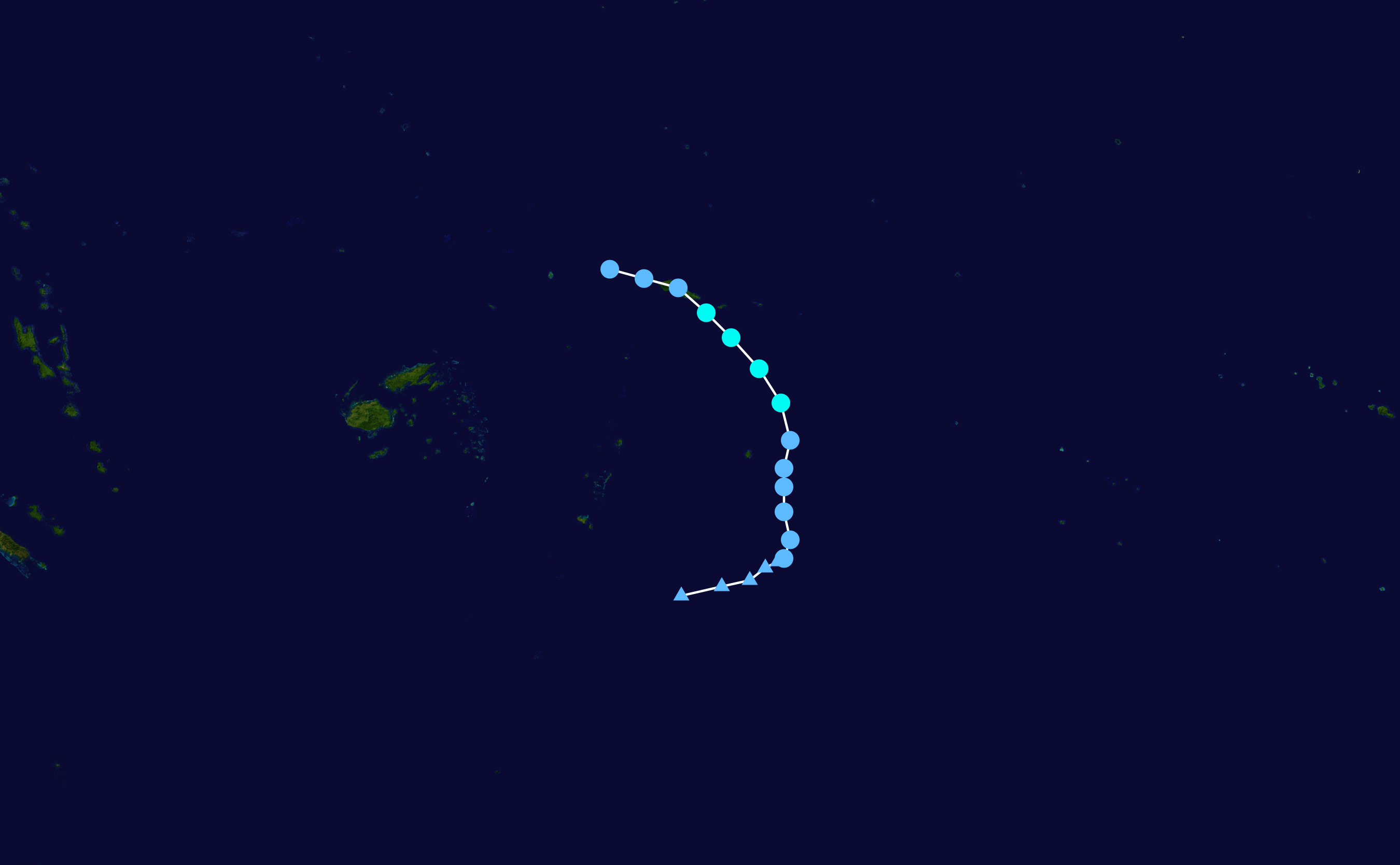
- Duration: February 19 – February 21
- Peak intensity: 75 km/h (45 mph) (10-min); 990 hPa (mbar)

The FMS analysed the formation of Tropical Disturbance 09F on February 19 near Wallis and Futuna, positioned within an area of low wind shear and divergent flow aloft. The east-southeastward-moving storm was upgraded to a tropical depression the next day, prompting routine advisories from the FMS. Developing rainbands quickly organised atop the newly formed and compact low-level circulation center. 09F tracked near Samoa on February 20 with maximum sustained winds of 55 km/h (34 mph), with the center later passing just south of Tutuila in American Samoa. Continuing to track towards the east-southeast, the depression strengthened into a Category 1 tropical cyclone later that day, receiving the name Vicky. Though the cyclone's rainbands expanded further, the storm's convection remained disorganised. Despite warm ocean waters and a conducive environment aloft for outflow, strong wind shear led to a deterioration of Vicky's shower activity. On February 21, the FMS issued their final advisory on Vicky once it transitioned into an ex-tropical system.

Flights to Pago Pago were cancelled indefinitely by Samoa Airways, with delays impacting Faleolo International Airport. Non-essential government employees in American Samoa were released from work on February 20 as Vicky passed to the south, suspending United States Postal Service and United States Department of Veterans Affairs operations. Vicky produced damaging winds and heavy rain in the Samoan islands as an intensifying system. Brief power outages affected parts of Samoa early on February 21. The combination of Vicky and two other tropical disturbances resulted in a peak rainfall of 203.2 mm (8.00 in) in Le'auva'a between February 17–20. A 120 km/h (75 mph) gust was measured in Pago Pago International Airport in American Samoa and sustained winds of 85 km/h (53 mph) were observed in Tutuila. One buoy off Aunu'u measured 3.7–4.3 m (12–14 ft) seas due to Vicky.

=== Tropical Cyclone Wasi ===
- Category 2 tropical cyclone (Australian scale)
- Tropical storm (SSHWS)
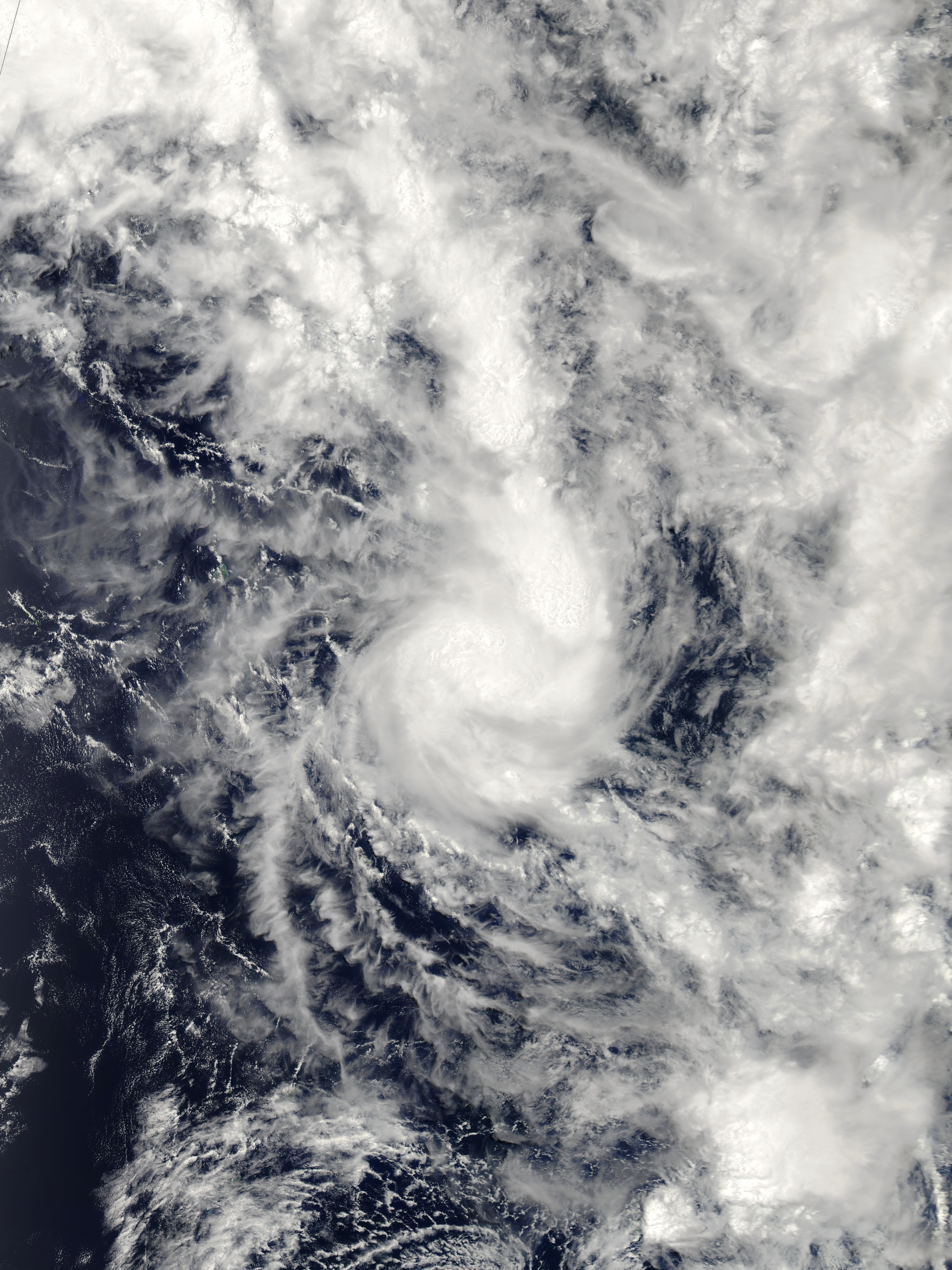
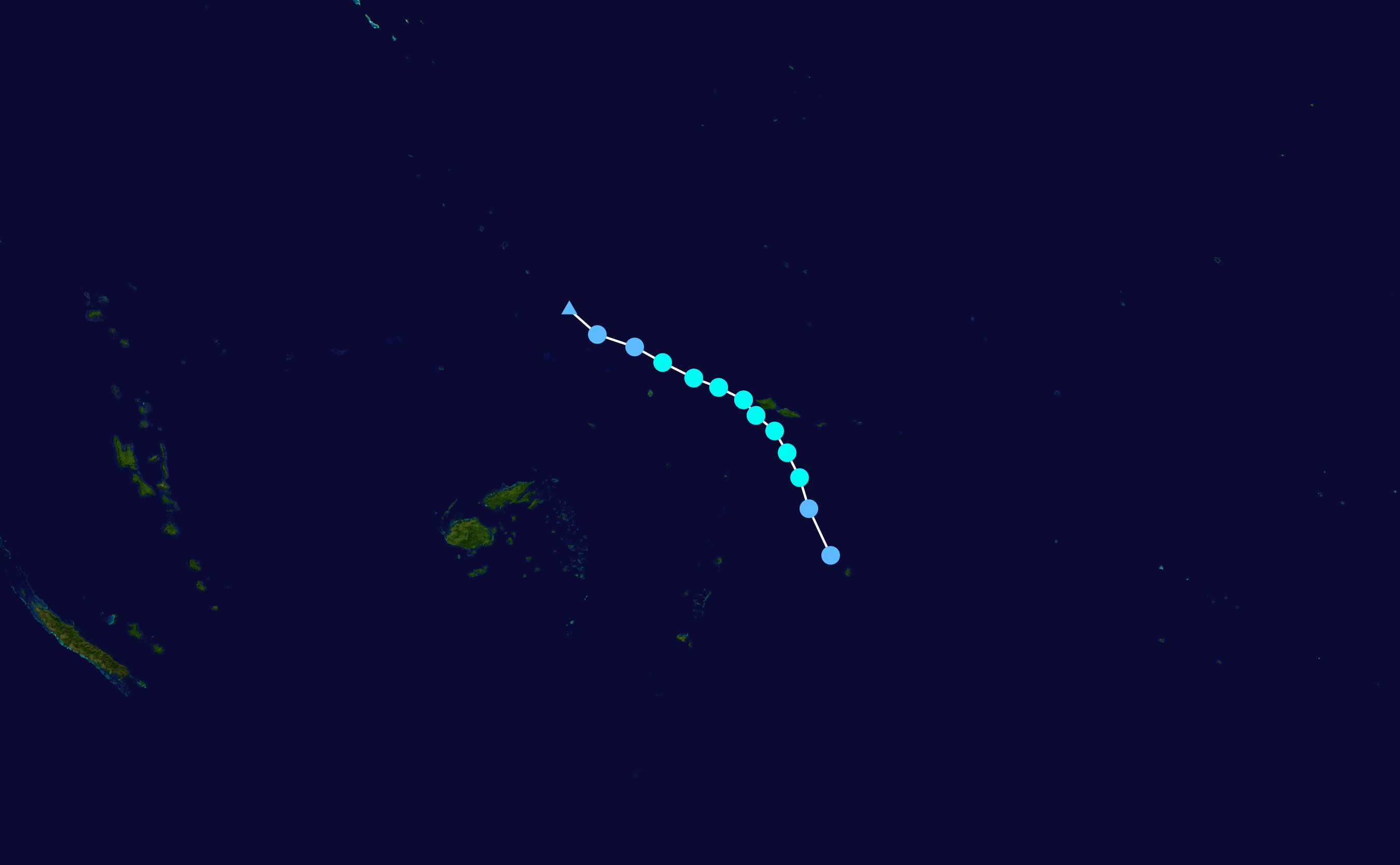
- Duration: February 21 – February 23
- Peak intensity: 110 km/h (70 mph) (10-min); 975 hPa (mbar)

During February 21, the FMS reported that Tropical Disturbance 10F had developed, about 145 km (90 mi) to the north of Mata Utu on the island of Wallis. The disturbance was located within an area of low vertical windshear while atmospheric convection persisted over and had started to wrap into the systems low-level circulation centre. 10F was upgraded to a tropical depression 12 hours after its initial designation. Continuing to organise throughout the day, the system was upgraded to Tropical Cyclone Wasi by February 22 while centred west of Samoa. A transient eye-like feature emerged on satellite imagery early on February 22, suggesting a cyclone stronger than its organisation suggested. While the cyclone was initially highly compact and within favourable conditions, interaction with the nearby insular landmasses suppressed Wasi's convection. Continued interaction ultimately caused Wasi to weaken and become increasingly disorganised after passing south of Samoa. Accelerating towards the south-southeast, convective activity associated with Wasi became limited to the cyclone's eastern half, eventually exposing the low-level centre of circulation on February 23. This circulation quickly slackened during the day.

The Samoa Meteorology Division issued a Category 1 Tropical Cyclone Warning for Samoa on 22 February, prompting the activation of the country's National Emergency Operations Centre. Heavy rain and flood warnings were also in effect for Samoa. Wasi was the second tropical cyclone to affect the Samoan islands in two days. Downpours from Wasi spread over the islands of Upolu and Savai'i. Two rivers in Savai'i flooded their banks and inundated adjacent roads. River and small stream flooding was also documented in Upolu. In American Samoa, 50 mm (2.0 in) of rain fell over a 12-hour span. Gusts to 69 km/h (43 mph) were reported at Pago Pago International Airport, which had suspended operations during Wasi's passage. Two homes were destroyed and six sustained major damage from the combined effects of Cyclones Wasi and Cyclone Vicky in American Samoa, which had struck the territory in the same week. Minor damage was inflicted to another 58 homes. A gale warning was issued by the FMS for Niue that was later cancelled upon Wasi's dissipation.

=== Tropical Cyclone Gretel ===
- Category 2 tropical cyclone (Australian scale)
- Category 1 tropical cyclone (SSHWS)
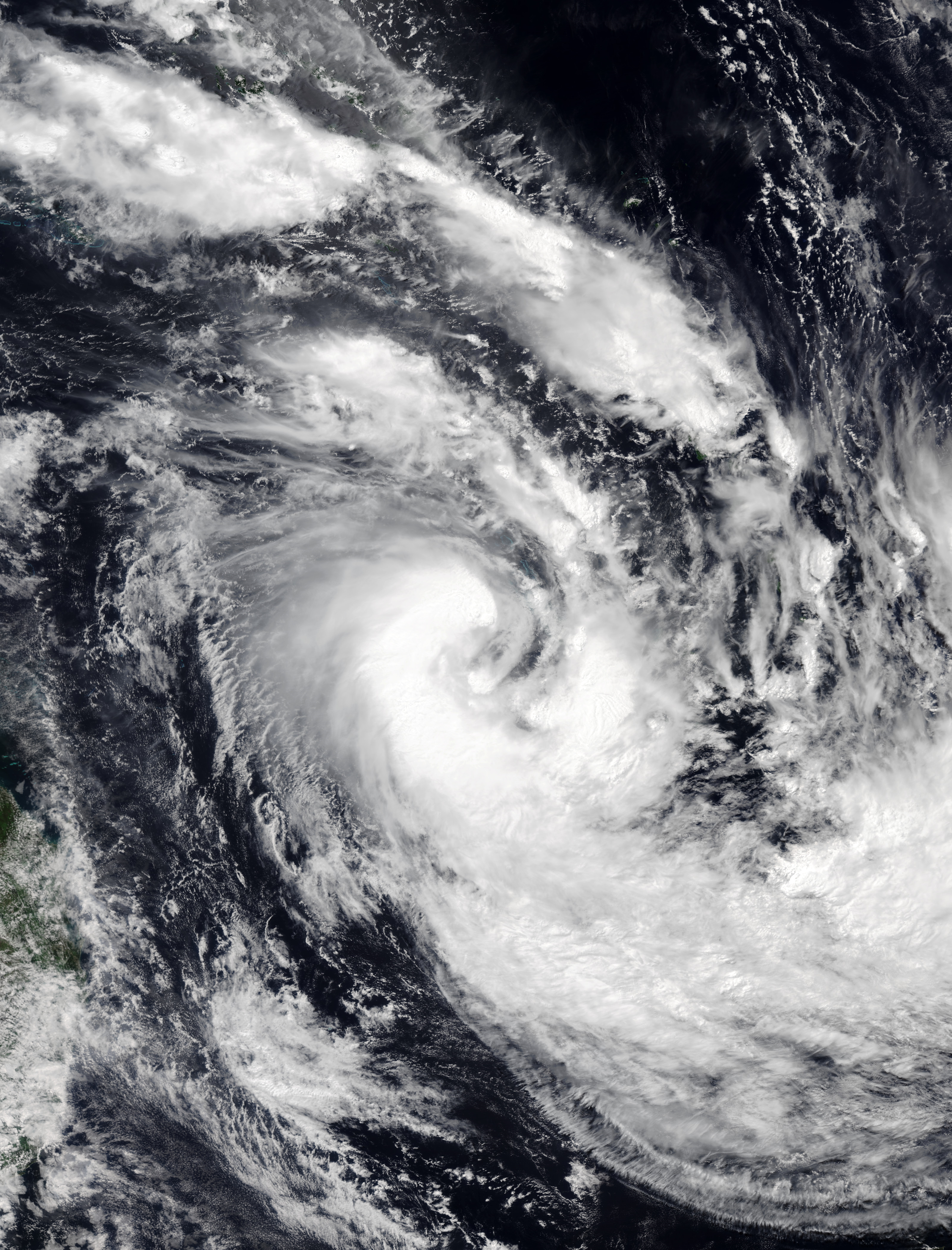
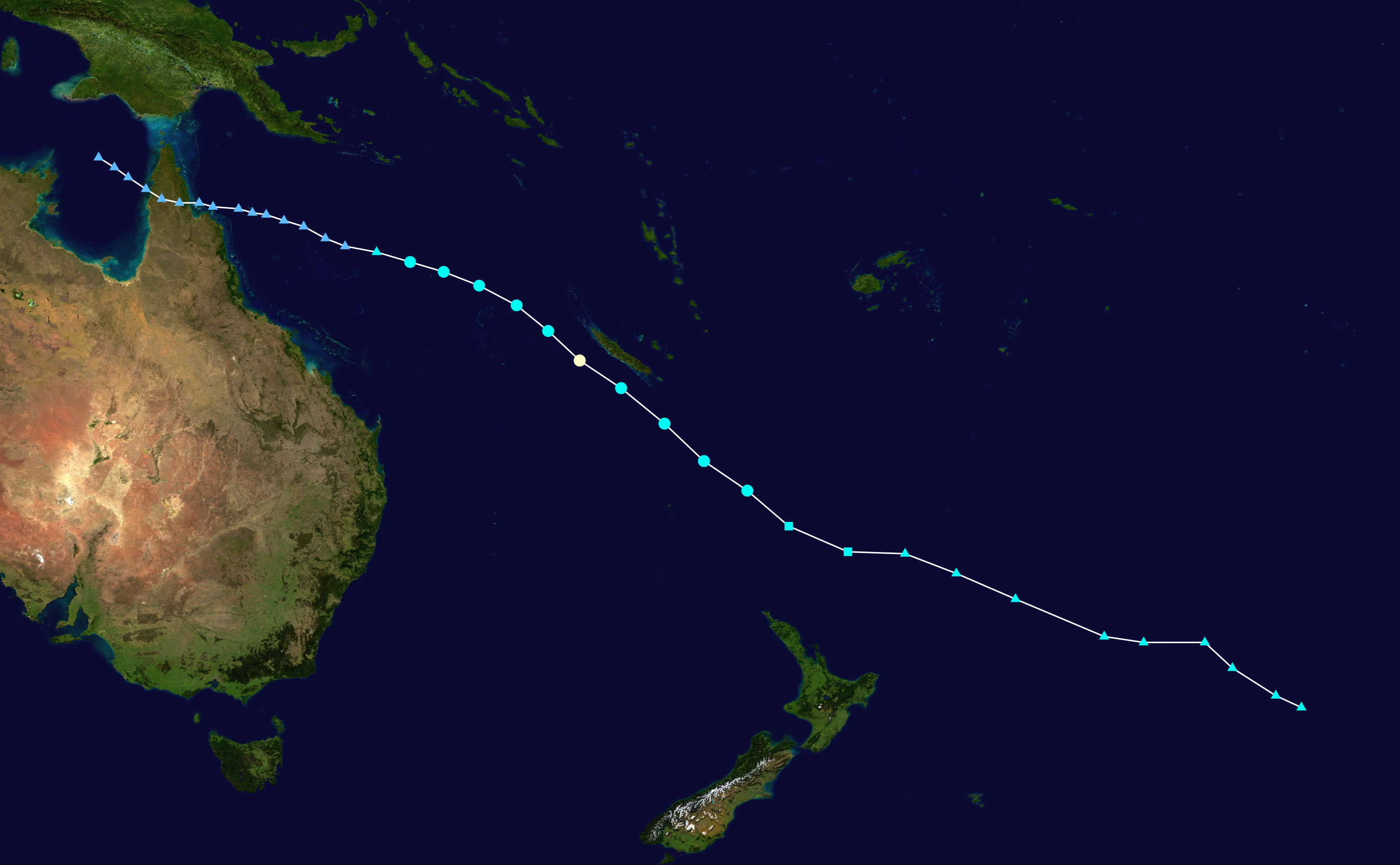
- Duration: March 14 (Entered basin) – March 16
- Peak intensity: 100 km/h (65 mph) (10-min); 980 hPa (mbar)

During March 15, Tropical Cyclone Gretel moved into the basin from the Australian region, about 620 km (385 mi) to the northwest of Nouméa in New Caledonia. Gretel continued to organise upon its entrance into the basin, exhibiting well-developed rainbands within a low-shear environment. Forced southeast by a nearby subtropical ridge, The storm passed 150 km (93 mi) south of New Caledonia on March 15. During this time, an eye-feature was noted by the JTWC on microwave-wavelength satellite imagery. The FMS upgraded Gretel to a Category 2 cyclone at 12:00 UTC that day. However, the storm's convective activity soon began to diminish as dry air began to permeate the low-level circulation center. The addition of strong vertical wind shear caused Gretel's remaining showers and thunderstorms to dislocate from the central vortex. Gretel quickly developed frontal features on March 16—a sign of extratropical transition.

Level 1 cyclone alerts were issued for New Caledonia's North and South provinces on March 15 and were lifted by the following morning. Shelters were opened throughout the territory in anticipation of Gretel's passage. Air Calédonie cancelled some of its March 15–16 flights; some Aircalin were also cancelled or rescheduled. All Raï bus routes were cancelled for March 15. Several ports were closed and the Ouaième–Hienghène ferry was suspended. Classes at the University of New Caledonia on March 16–17 were closed at their Nouméa and Koné campuses; the Collège de Païamboué also closed its classes. Power outages affected the greater Nouméa area on New Caledonia, particularly in Le Mont-Dore and Savannah sur Mer. Across three municipalities, 791 homes were without power by the evening of March 15, and ultimately at least 6,931 electricity customers lost power during Gretel's passage. Some roads were blocked by downed trees. Gretel's effects disrupted some municipal elections, flooding a polling station and preventing voter travel in some municipalities; voter turnout was diminished relative to the previous elections in 2014. Northern parts of New Caledonia received 50–80 mm (2.0–3.1 in) of rain over a six-hour period, and 100–150 mm (3.9–5.9 in) of rain overall was recorded on the northern and southern extents of Grande Terre. Floods overtook a bridge between Pouébo and Ouégoa. Rough seas grounded a barge in Nouville. The Australian territory of Norfolk Island recorded maximum 10-minute sustained winds of 57 km/h (35 mph) and a maximum gust to 83 km/h (52 mph) on March 16.

=== Severe Tropical Cyclone Harold ===
- Category 5 severe tropical cyclone (Australian scale)
- Category 5 tropical cyclone (SSHWS)
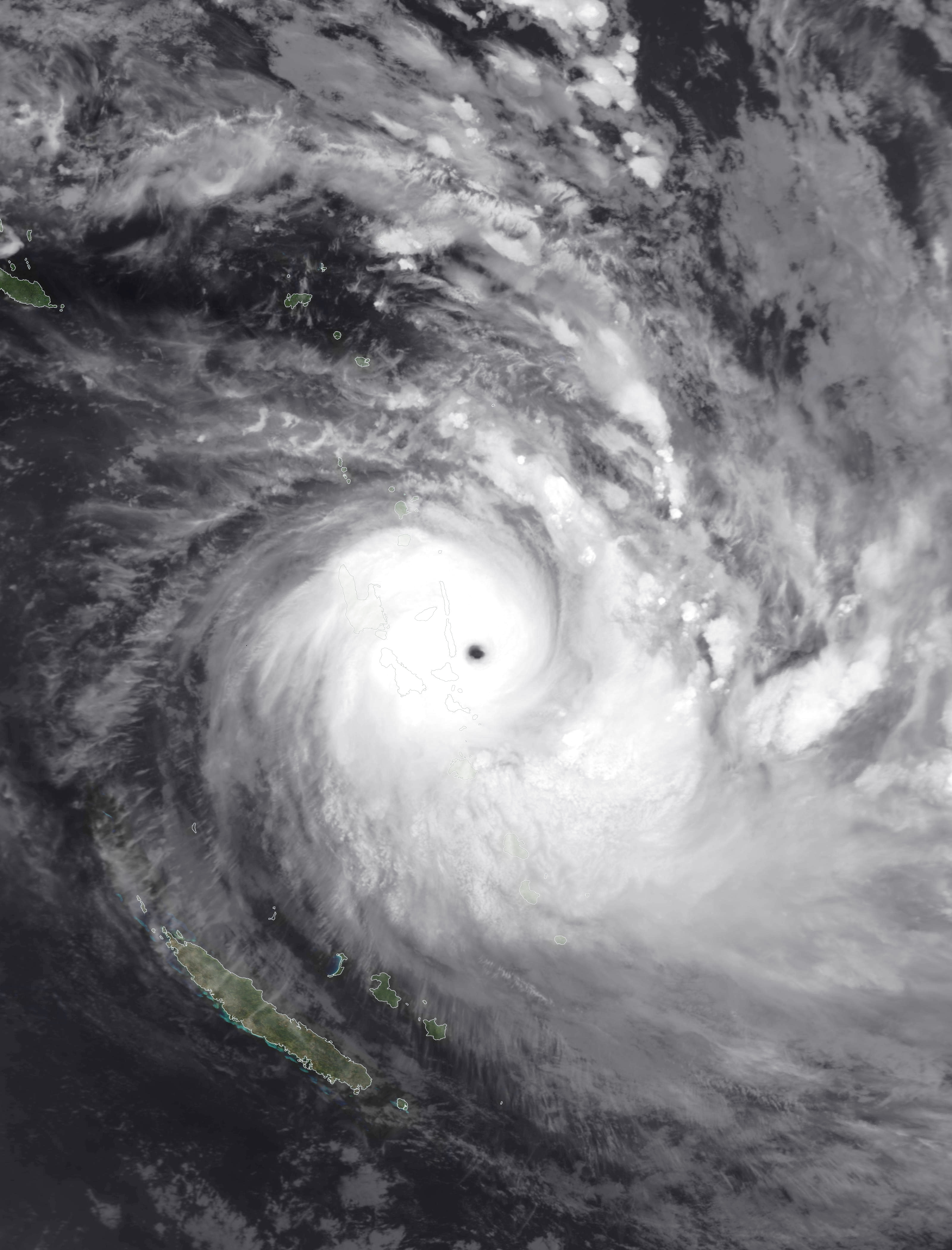
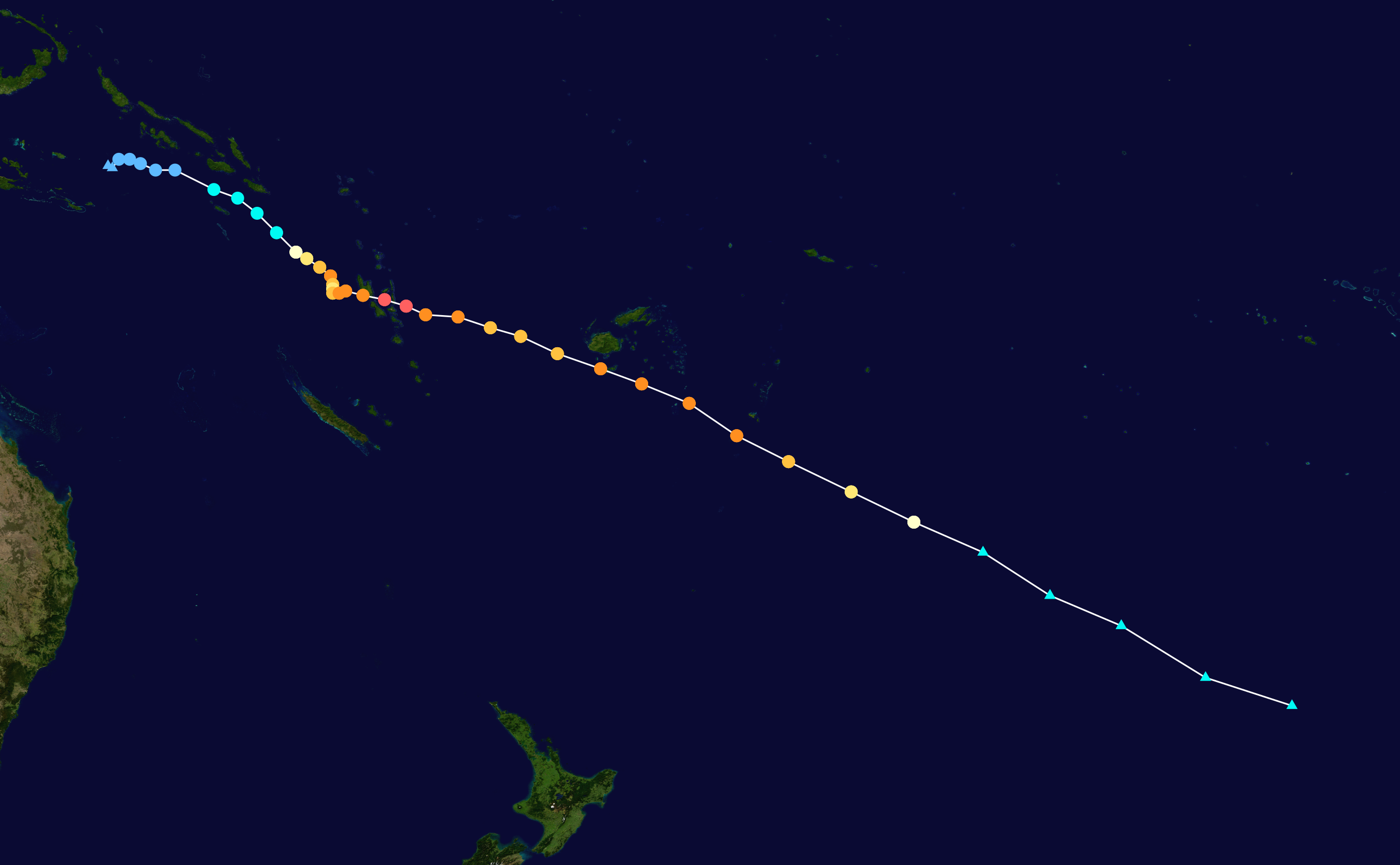
- Duration: April 2 (Entered basin) – April 10
- Peak intensity: 230 km/h (145 mph) (10-min); 920 hPa (mbar)

During April 3, Tropical Cyclone Harold moved into the basin from the Australian region, as a Category 1 tropical cyclone on the Australian scale. Atmospheric conditions were supportive of further intensification within the South Pacific as the storm tracked towards the southeast. On April 3, Harold began to quickly gain in organisation and intensity, developing tightly wound rainbands and a pinhole eye. Harold rapidly intensified into a Category 3 severe tropical cyclone by April 4; Category 4 intensity was reached by 12:00 UTC that day, with Harold exhibiting maximum ten-minute sustained winds of 165 km/h (103 mph). The JTWC assessed Harold three hours later as having one-minute sustained winds of 215 km/h (134 mph), equivalent to a Category 4 hurricane on the Saffir–Simpson scale. Concurrently, an extension of an area of high pressure to Harold's east caused the storm's track to slow and curve increasingly southward. Afterwards, the storm recurved eastwards and accelerated before turning east-southeastwards. On the next day, the storm intensified into a Category 5 Severe Tropical Cyclone, the highest rating on the Australian scale. Later that day, at 1:00 P.M. local time, the storm made landfall on Espiritu Santo. At landfall, the storm had 10-minute winds of 215 km/h (134 mph). Intensification continued and by 12:00 UTC, it reached peak intensity as a Category 5-equivalent cyclone on the Saffir-Simpson scale, with 10-minute winds of 230 km/h (140 mph) and a minimum barometric pressure of 920 mbar (27.17 inHg). It maintained the intensity for only 6 hours before weakening back to a Category 4-equivalent cyclone. The storm began an Eyewall replacement cycle. And thus, both warning centers downgraded the system. After the cyclone was completed, a new eye formed. Thus, the FMS upgraded Harold to a Category 5 severe tropical cyclone for the second time. Later that day, it reached Category 4 status on the SSHWS yet again. On April 8, the storm passed just south of Fiji and passed over Kadavu Island. The system finally began to weaken as it accelerated towards Tonga. Later that day, the storm passed just 100 mi (160 km) south of Tongatapu, the main island of Tonga, as a Category 3-equivalent cyclone. On the next day, the storm began an extratropical transition while it moved into MetService's area of responsibility. The JTWC subsequently issued its final advisory on Harold, as it was expected to gain frontal characteristics and complete its extratropical transition within 12 hours. MetService subsequently declared Harold to be an extratropical cyclone during April 10, before the system was last noted during the following day around 1,500 km (930 mi) to the southwest of Adamstown in the Pitcairn Islands. Cyclone warnings were issued for the entirety of the Solomon Islands as Harold approached on April 3. Strong winds blew down trees in Honiara, causing power outages and blocking roads. Rainfall associated with the passing storm also caused flooding, forcing dozens of families out of their homes. A ferry repatriating 738 people from Honiara to Malaita Province amid the COVID-19 pandemic encountered the storm in the Ironbottom Sound; 28 people were washed overboard by the waves. All but one of the people are presumed dead.

On April 3, the Vanuatu National Disaster Management Office (VNDMO) issued a Yellow Alert for Torba and Sanma provinces in Vanuatu. The Vanuatu Meteorology and Geo-Hazards Department also issued a tropical cyclone warning for these areas. The yellow alert was upgraded to a red alert on April 4, while yellow alerts were also issued for Malampa and Penama provinces. Red alerts eventually encompassed Malampa, Penama, Sanma, and Torba provinces, with a yellow alert for Shefa Province. The VNDMO advised for all residents under the red alert to remain indoors. All COVID-19 preparedness activities were suspended to facilitate preparations and evacuations for Harold. Harold was the first severe tropical cyclone to strike Vanuatu since Cyclone Pam in 2015, bringing gusts above 275 km/h (171 mph), 250–450 mm (9.8–17.7 in) of rain, and a storm surge of 0.8 m (2.6 ft) causing catastrophic damage, torrential flooding and communication disruptions and plunging Vanuatu into a blackout.

In Fiji, heavy rain alerts were issued for the western half of Viti Levu, Kadavu, and the Mamanuca and Yasawa islands on April 6. Storm warnings were later put in effect for the areas under a heavy rain alert, in addition to the Lomaiviti Islands. The highest warning, a hurricane warning, was issued for Kadavu and Ono-i-Lau on April 7. The Fiji National Disaster Management Office (FDNMO) activated their Emergency Operations Centre to streamline preparations and evacuations. A total of eighty-five shelters were opened, with at least two in each of Fiji's four districts. All village headmen and community leaders were directed to. All COVID-19-related activities were also cancelled in order to prepare for the impact of Harold. Early on April 7, the storm began affecting the nation with gusty winds, moderate coastal flooding, and storm surge. These conditioners worsened as the storm approached. In contrast to the forecasts, the passed only to the south of Fiji and thus, the northern islands received little damage. Kadavu Island was hit the worst as the storm's center passed over the island. Many infrastructures were damaged or destroyed due to the strong wind and storm surge.

== Storm names ==
Within the Southern Pacific a tropical depression is judged to have reached tropical cyclone intensity should it reach winds of 65 km/h (40 mph) and it is evident that gales are occurring at least halfway around the center. Tropical depressions that intensify into a tropical cyclone between the Equator and 25°S and between 160°E and 120°W are named by the FMS. However, should a tropical depression intensify to the south of 25°S between 160°E and 120°W it will be named by MetService in conjunction with the FMS. If a tropical cyclone moves out of the basin and into the Australian region, it will retain its original name. The names Sarai, Tino, Uesi, and Wasi would be used for the first time this year (and only, in the case of Sarai and Tino), after replacing the names Sose, Trina and Waka and after the 2000-01 and 2001-02 seasons respectively. Uesi was subsequently added to the list later on. The names that were used for 2019–20 season are listed below:

- Rita
- Sarai
- Tino
- Uesi
- Vicky
- Wasi

If a tropical cyclone enters the South Pacific basin from the Australian region basin (west of 160°E), it will retain the name assigned to it by the Australian Bureau of Meteorology. The following storms were named in this manner:

- Gretel
- Harold

=== Retirement ===
After the season, the names Sarai and Tino were retired due to the damages they caused, and were replaced with Samadiyo and Tasi. While not forming in the basin, the name Harold was also retired and replaced with Heath.

== Season effects ==
This table lists all the storms that developed in the South Pacific to the east of longitude 160°E during the 2019–20 season. It includes their intensity on the Australian tropical cyclone intensity scale, duration, name, landfalls, deaths, and damages.

Name	Dates	Peak intensity			Areas affected	Damage (USD)	Deaths	Ref(s).
Name	Dates	Category	Wind speed	Pressure	Areas affected	Damage (USD)	Deaths	Ref(s).
Rita	November 22 – 26	Category 2 tropical cyclone	110 km/h (70 mph)	977 hPa (28.85 inHg)	Solomon Islands, Vanuatu	None	None	
02F	December 19 – 23	Tropical disturbance	Not specified	999 hPa (29.50 inHg)	Samoan Islands	None	None	
Sarai	December 23 – January 2	Category 2 tropical cyclone	110 km/h (70 mph)	972 hPa (28.70 inHg)	Fiji, Tonga, Niue, southern Cook Islands	$2.3 million	2	
Tino	January 11 – 20	Category 3 severe tropical cyclone	120 km/h (75 mph)	970 hPa (28.64 inHg)	Fiji, Niue, Solomon Islands, Samoan Islands, Tonga, Tuvalu, Vanuatu	$5.83 million	2 (missing)	
05F	January 24 – 25	Tropical disturbance	Not specified	1003 hPa (29.62 inHg)	Samoan Islands	None	None	
Uesi	February 4 – 13	Category 3 severe tropical cyclone	130 km/h (80 mph)	975 hPa (28.79 inHg)	Solomon Islands, Vanuatu, New Caledonia, New Zealand	Minor	None	
07F	February 14 – 21	Tropical disturbance	Not specified	998 hPa (29.47 inHg)	Tuvalu, Samoan Islands, Tokelau, Niue	None	None	
08F	February 17 – 18	Tropical disturbance	Not specified	996 hPa (29.41 inHg)	Samoan Islands, Niue, Cook Islands	None	None	
Vicky	February 19 – 21	Category 1 tropical cyclone	75 km/h (45 mph)	990 hPa (29.23 inHg)	Samoan Islands, Niue	Minor	None	
Wasi	February 21 – 23	Category 2 tropical cyclone	110 km/h (70 mph)	975 hPa (28.79 inHg)	Wallis and Futuna, Samoan Islands	Minor	None	
Gretel	March 14 – 16	Category 2 tropical cyclone	100 km/h (65 mph)	980 hPa (28.94 inHg)	New Caledonia, Norfolk Island, New Zealand	None	None	
Harold	April 2 – 10	Category 5 severe tropical cyclone	230 km/h (145 mph)	920 hPa (27.17 inHg)	Solomon Islands, Vanuatu, Fiji, Tonga	$768 million	3	
Season aggregates
12 systems	November 22 – April 10		230 km/h (145 mph)	920 hPa (27.17 inHg)		$776.13 million	5	

== See also ==
- Weather of 2019 and 2020
- South Pacific tropical cyclone
- List of Southern Hemisphere cyclone seasons
- Tropical cyclones in 2019, 2020
- Atlantic hurricane seasons: 2019, 2020
- Pacific hurricane seasons: 2019, 2020
- Pacific typhoon seasons: 2019, 2020
- North Indian Ocean cyclone seasons: 2019, 2020
- 2019–20 South-West Indian Ocean cyclone season
- 2019–20 Australian region cyclone season
