= Cyclone Amos =

Category 3 South Pacific cyclone in 2016

Severe Tropical Cyclone Amos
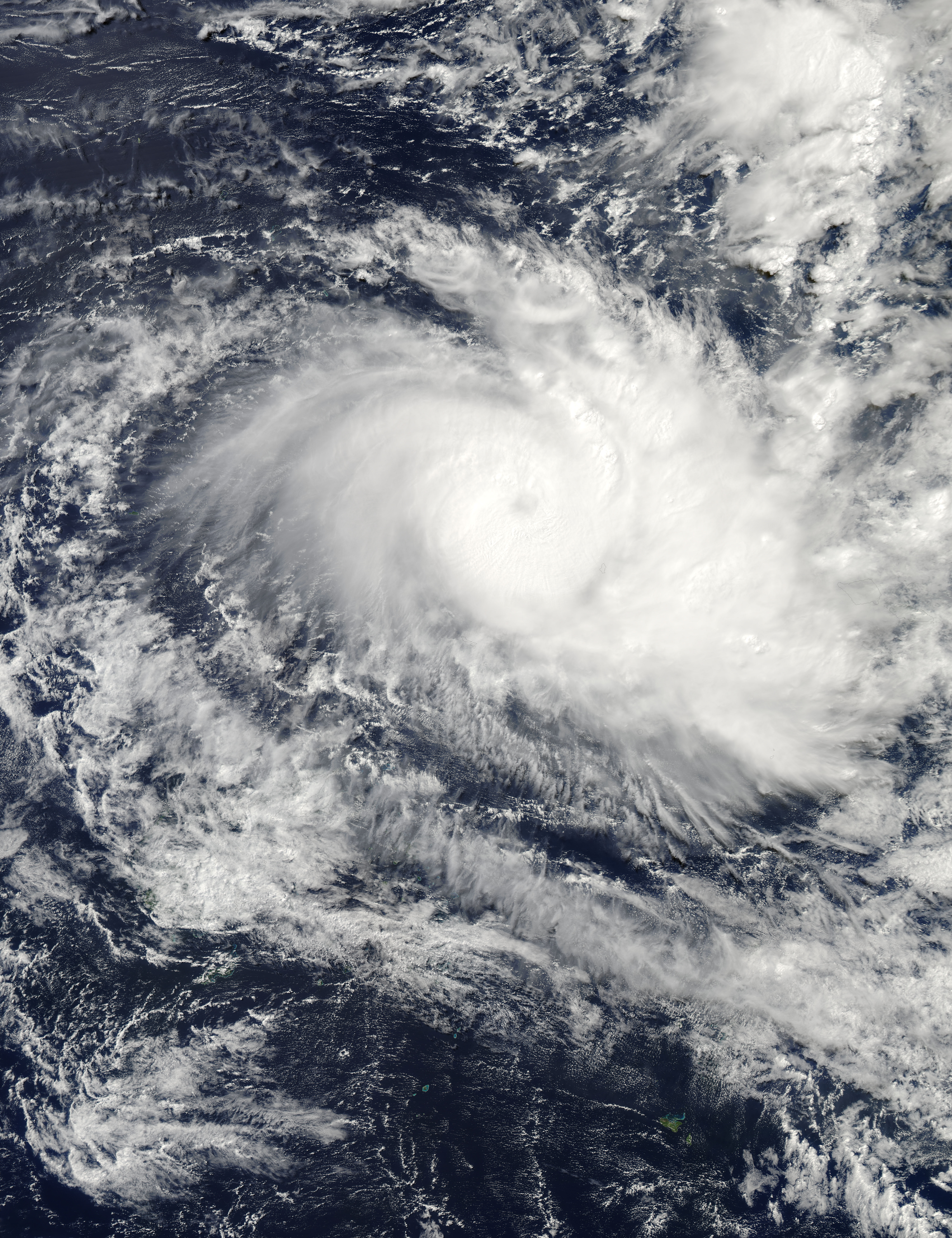
- Cyclone Amos intensifying near Wallis and Futuna on April 22

Meteorological history
- Formed: April 13, 2016
- Dissipated: April 25, 2016

Category 3 severe tropical cyclone
- 10-minute sustained (FMS)
- Highest winds: 150 km/h (90 mph)
- Lowest pressure: 965 hPa (mbar); 28.50 inHg

Category 2-equivalent tropical cyclone
- 1-minute sustained (SSHWS/JTWC)
- Highest winds: 165 km/h (105 mph)
- Lowest pressure: 956 hPa (mbar); 28.23 inHg

Overall effects
- Areas affected: Samoa, American Samoa, Wallis and Futuna, Fiji
- IBTrACS
- Part of the 2015–16 South Pacific cyclone season

Severe Tropical Cyclone Amos was a strong tropical cyclone that affected the Fijian and Samoan Islands as well as Wallis and Futuna. Amos was first noted as Tropical Disturbance 17F during April 13, 2016 to the northwest of Fiji. The system subsequently moved south-eastwards towards the Fijian Islands, before it passed near or over Vanua Levu during April 16. After passing over Fiji, the system gradually developed further as it moved north-eastwards towards the Samoan Islands. The system was subsequently named Amos during April 20, after it had developed into a tropical cyclone and started to move north-westwards towards the island nation of Tuvalu.

== Meteorological history ==
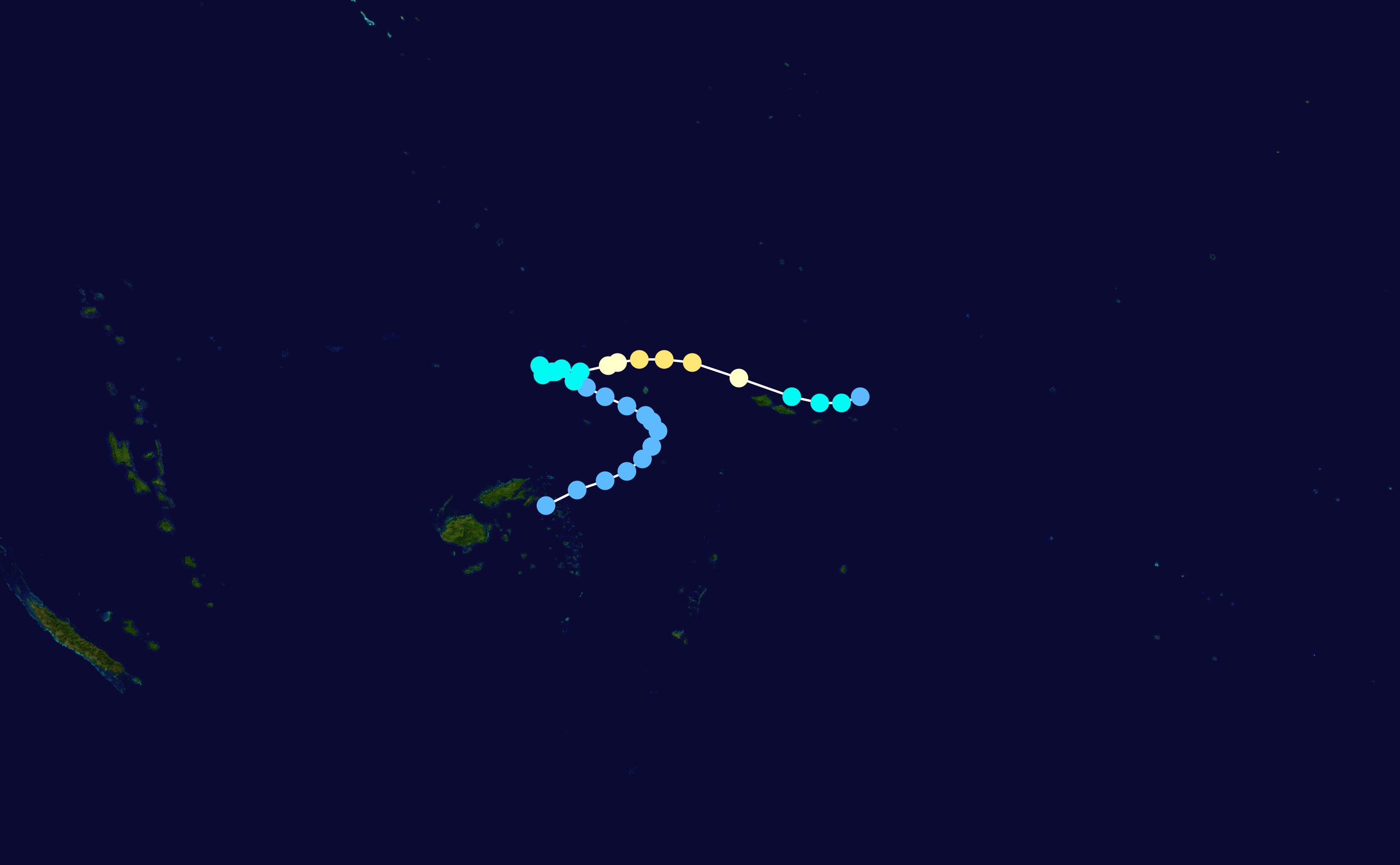
Map plotting the storm's track and intensity, according to the Saffir–Simpson scale Map key Saffir–Simpson scale Tropical depression (≤38 mph, ≤62 km/h) Tropical storm (39–73 mph, 63–118 km/h) Category 1 (74–95 mph, 119–153 km/h) Category 2 (96–110 mph, 154–177 km/h) Category 3 (111–129 mph, 178–208 km/h) Category 4 (130–156 mph, 209–251 km/h) Category 5 (≥157 mph, ≥252 km/h) Unknown Storm type Tropical cyclone Subtropical cyclone Extratropical cyclone, remnant low, tropical disturbance, or monsoon depression

Tropical Disturbance 17F was first noted by the Fiji Meteorological Service on April 13, while it was located about 130 km (80 mi) to the northwest of the Fijian dependency of Rotuma. The system was located underneath an upper level anticyclonic circulation and within an area of low vertical wind shear. Over the next couple of days the system moved westwards, before it started moving south-eastwards towards Fiji during April 15. The system was subsequently classified as a tropical depression on April 16, as passed near or over several islands in Fiji's Northern Division including Vanua Levu. Over the next couple of days 17F moved north-eastwards towards the Samoan Islands and passed about 50 km (30 mi) to the west of Tonga's Niuas island group during April 18. A tropical cyclone formation alert on the system was issued by the United States Joint Typhoon Warning Center during that day, as the well defined low level circulation centre consolidated. The depression subsequently started to move north-westwards towards the island nation of Tuvalu, under the influence of a subtropical ridge of high pressure. The system subsequently passed in between the islands of Wallis and Futuna, as a tropical depression during April 19.

Early on April 20, the JTWC initiated advisories on the system and designated it as Tropical Cyclone 20P, while the system was located about 585 km (365 mi) to the west of Avata, Samoa. Later that day, the FMS named the depression Amos, after the system had developed into a Category 1 tropical cyclone on the Australian tropical cyclone intensity scale. However, further development of the system at this time was restricted by a trough of low pressure to the northeast of the system, which was causing subsidence over the systems north-eastern quadrant. Amos subsequently slowed down later that day and became nearly stationary, as a near-equatorial ridge of high pressure became the primary steering mechanism. As a result of this new primary steering mechanism, the system turned eastwards and moved towards the Samoan Islands. As the system moved eastwards it started to rapidly intensify further, with an eye feature developing on microwave imagery. Amos subsequently peaked as a Category 3 Severe Tropical Cyclone, with ten-minute sustained wind speeds of 150 km/h (93 mph) during April 22. During that day as the cyclone passed within 120 km (75 mi) of Wallis Island, the JTWC estimated that Amos had peaked with 1-minute sustained winds of 165 km/h (103 mph). Over the next day, the system remained at its peak intensity as it accelerated south-eastwards towards the Samoan Islands, where it was expected to pass over either Upolu or Tutuila. Amos subsequently continued its south-eastwards movement and was thought to have passed very close to or over the Samoan Islands during April 23. The system subsequently significantly weakened over the next day, as the circulation broke down and became sheared. The system subsequently degenerated into a tropical disturbance during April 25, before it was last noted near American Samoa's Manuʻa Islands.

== Preparations and impact ==
Wettest tropical cyclones and their remnants in Wallis and Futuna Highest-known totals
Precipitation			Storm	Location	Ref.
Rank	mm	in	Storm	Location	Ref.
1	674.9	26.57	Raja 1986	Maopoopo, Futuna Island	
2	556.7	21.92	Fran 1992	Hihifo, Wallis Island	
3	291.2	11.46	Val 1975	Hihifo, Wallis Island	
4	220.6	8.69	Hina 1997	Maopoopo, Futuna Island	
5	186.0	7.32	Evan 2012	Futuna Island	
6	180.0	7.09	Val 1980	Maopoopo, Futuna Island	
7	171.6	6.76	Keli 1997	Hihifo, Wallis Island	
8	160.8	6.33	Unnamed 1966	Malaetoli, Wallis Island	
9	160.0	6.30	Amos 2016	Hihifo, Wallis Island	
10	119.0	4.69	Waka 2001	Hihifo, Wallis Island	

Severe Tropical Cyclone Amos affected the island nations of Fiji, Samoa and American Samoa, while the French Territory of Wallis and Futuna was also impacted.

=== Fiji ===
The precursor tropical disturbance to Cyclone Amos impacted Fiji between April 15–19, while the island nation was still recovering from the effects of Severe Tropical Cyclones Winston, Zena and Tropical Depressions 14F/15F. As the system impacting the island nation, the Fiji Meteorological Service issued strong wind and heavy rain warnings, for the whole of the archipelago including Rotuma. Flood warnings were also issued for parts of Vanua Levu including the Labasa, Qawa and Rakiraki Rivers and Labasa. The disturbance subsequently passed near or over several islands, in Fiji's Northern Division including Vanua Levu during April 16. The system brought several periods of heavy rain and strong winds to most of the Fijian Islands, with severe flooding reported on Vanua Levu during April 17.

=== Wallis and Futuna ===
As Amos approached Wallis and Futuna, the Meteo-France NC issued an Alert 1 for the islands, which was later upgraded to an Alert 2. Amos was forecasted to bring winds of 120 to 140 km/h (75 to 87 mph) with waves of four to six meters high. Very heavy rains affected Wallis and Futuna as Amos made its closest approach to the islands. At the Hihifo Airport in Wallis, a rainfall measurement of 160 millimetres (6.3 in) was recorded.

=== Samoa ===
Since Amos was forecast to hit Samoa as a Category 4 storm on April 24, emergency preparations went underway with water and generators being distributed. Amos was forecasted to bring sustained winds of 170 km/h (110 mph), with gusts as high as 220 km/h (140 mph) to Apia. A total of 63 residents were evacuated prior to the storm. Despite the forecasts however, the impacts from Amos were not as severe as initially predicted. Amos hit the Samoan islands as a Category 3 storm, dropping between 100 and 300 millimetres (3.9 and 11.8 in) of rain and bringing winds of up to 120 km/h (75 mph) to the islands. The most severe damage occurred in Savai'i where roads were damaged due to flooding. In addition, it is estimated that about 70 percent of the island nation lost electricity during the storm due to high winds.

=== American Samoa ===
On April 23, the Joint Typhoon Warning Center issued forecasts that indicated that Amos would pass directly over American Samoa by April 24. However, a recalculation in the storm position on April 24 altered the forecast track, sparing Pago Pago from a direct hit from Amos. Amos brushed American Samoa to the north, dumping just over three inches of rain over Pago Pago. Amos was the strongest tropical cyclone to affect Samoa and American Samoa since Cyclone Evan in December 2012. Only three cyclones have tracked near American Samoa since 1959.

== See also ==
- Cyclone Evan
- Cyclone Val
- Cyclone Ofa
