= Cyclone Waka =

Category 4 South Pacific cyclone in 2001 and 2002

Severe Tropical Cyclone Waka
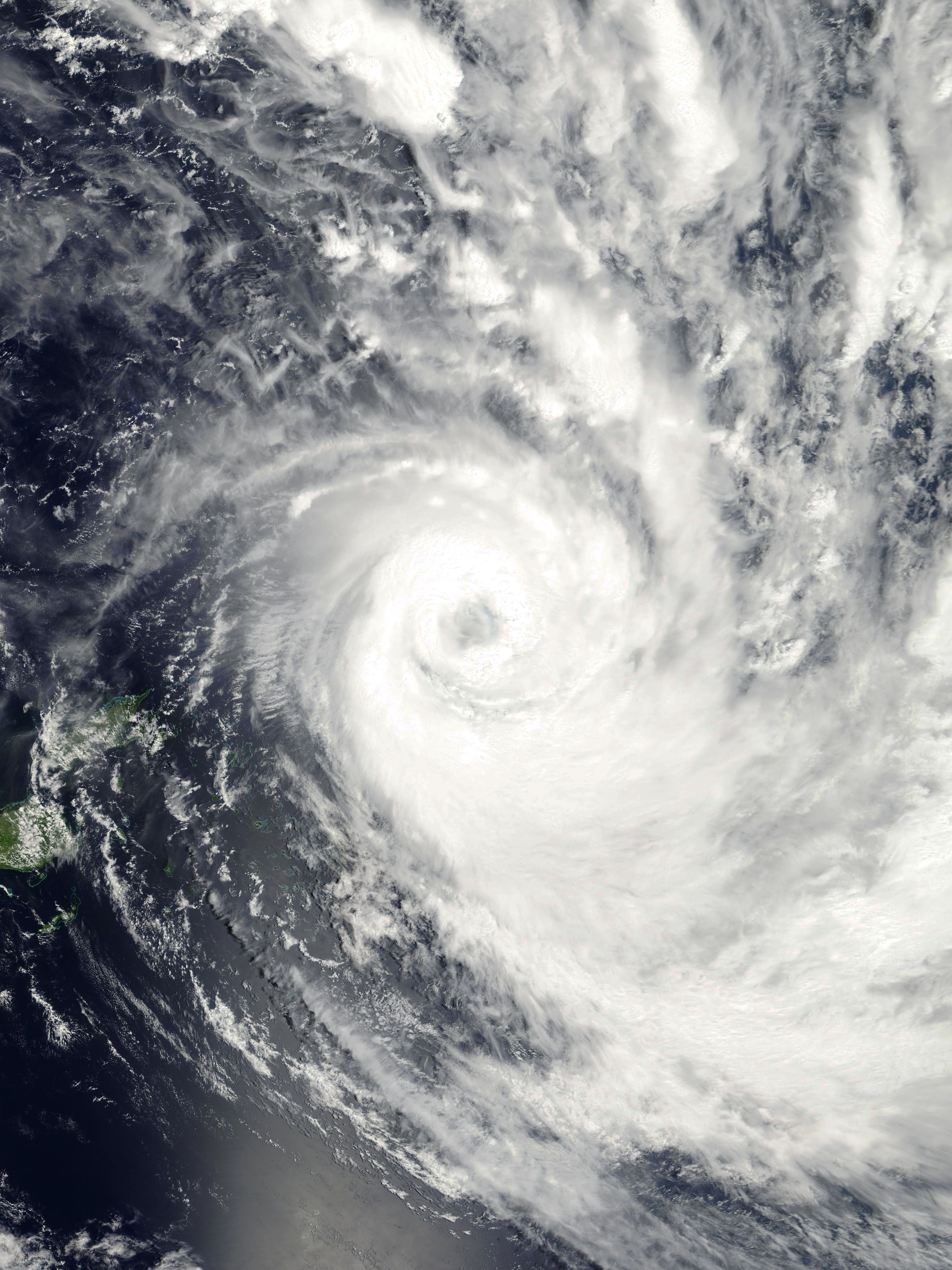
- Cyclone Waka near peak intensity shortly before moving through Tonga

Meteorological history
- Formed: December 19, 2001
- Dissipated: January 2, 2002

Category 4 severe tropical cyclone
- 10-minute sustained (FMS)
- Highest winds: 185 km/h (115 mph)
- Highest gusts: 250 km/h (155 mph)
- Lowest pressure: 930 hPa (mbar); 27.46 inHg

Category 3-equivalent tropical cyclone
- 1-minute sustained (SSHWS/JTWC)
- Highest winds: 185 km/h (115 mph)
- Lowest pressure: 944 hPa (mbar); 27.88 inHg

Overall effects
- Fatalities: 1 indirect
- Damage: $51.4 million (2002 USD)
- Areas affected: Wallis and Futuna, Niue, Tonga; especially Vava'u, and New Zealand
- IBTrACS
- Part of the 2001–02 South Pacific cyclone season

Severe Tropical Cyclone Waka (Fiji Meteorological Service designation: 03F, Joint Typhoon Warning Center designation: 07P) was one of the most destructive tropical cyclones ever to affect the nation of Tonga. Waka originated within the near-equatorial trough in mid-December 2001, although the system remained disorganized for more than a week. The storm gradually matured and attained tropical cyclone status on December 29, 2001. Subsequently, Waka underwent rapid intensification in which it attained its peak intensity as a Category 4 severe tropical cyclone (Australian tropical cyclone intensity scale) on December 31, with winds of 185 km/h (115 mph). Shortly thereafter, it passed directly over Vavaʻu, Tonga, resulting in widespread damage. By January 1, 2002, the cyclone began to weaken as it underwent an extratropical transition. The remnants of Waka persisted for several more days and were last observed near the Southern Ocean on January 6, 2002.

Although the storm affected several countries along its path, Waka left the most significant losses in Tonga, where it killed one person and caused 104.2 million paʻanga ($51.3 million USD) in damage. Hundreds of structures, including 200 in the island's largest city, and much of the nation's agriculture were destroyed. Winds in excess of 185 km/h (115 mph) battered Vava'u, defoliating nearly every tree on the island. In addition to infrastructural and public losses, the environment was also severely affected; a native species of bat lost roughly 80% of its population due to the lack of fruit. Following the storm, Tonga requested international aid to cope with the scale of damage. Due to the severity of damage, the name Waka was later retired and replaced with Wiki. According to a study by Janet Franklin et al., storms similar in intensity to Waka, on average, strike Tonga once every 33 years.

== Meteorological history ==
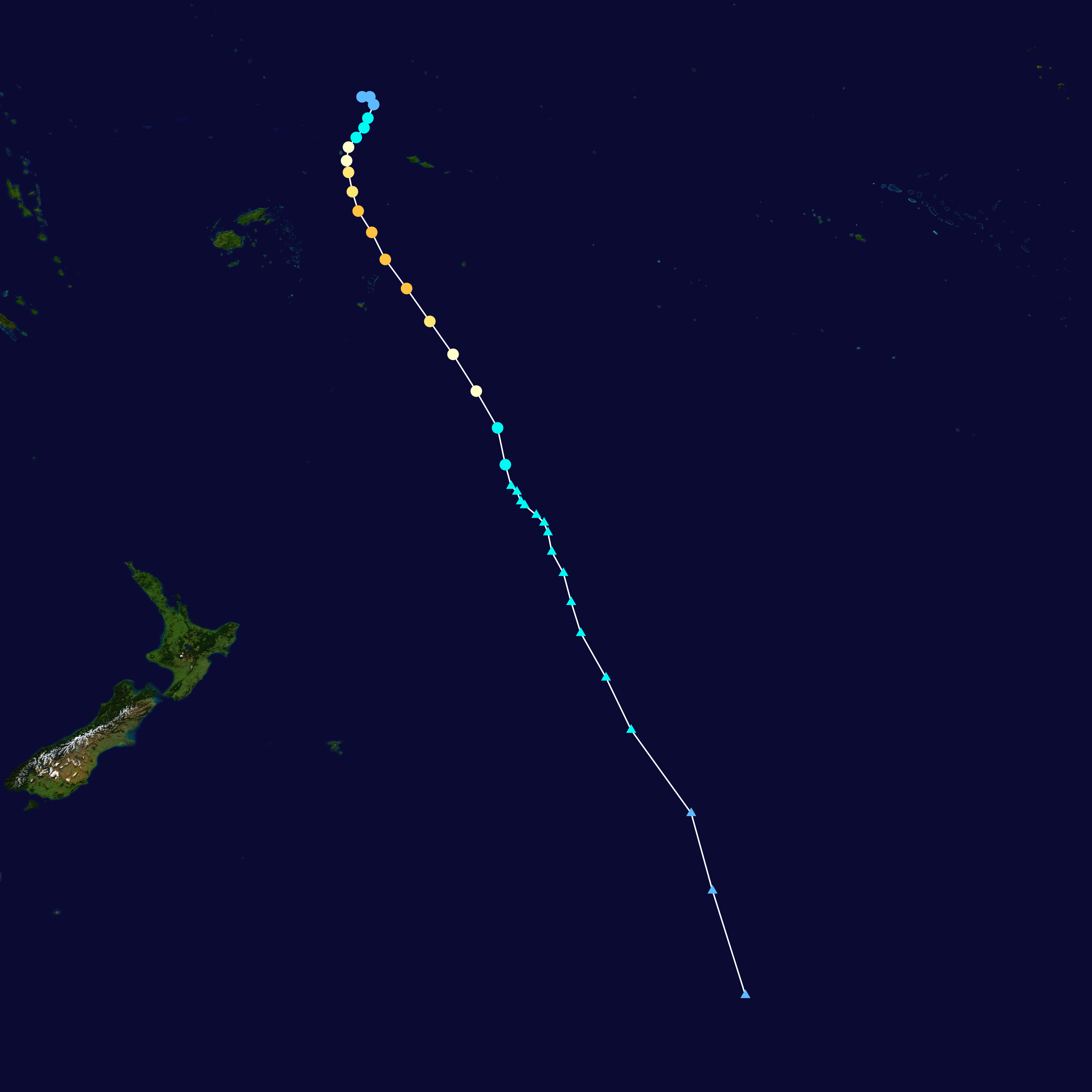
Map plotting the storm's track and intensity, according to the Saffir–Simpson scale Map key Saffir–Simpson scale Tropical depression (≤38 mph, ≤62 km/h) Tropical storm (39–73 mph, 63–118 km/h) Category 1 (74–95 mph, 119–153 km/h) Category 2 (96–110 mph, 154–177 km/h) Category 3 (111–129 mph, 178–208 km/h) Category 4 (130–156 mph, 209–251 km/h) Category 5 (≥157 mph, ≥252 km/h) Unknown Storm type Tropical cyclone Subtropical cyclone Extratropical cyclone, remnant low, tropical disturbance, or monsoon depression

In mid-December 2001, at the end of a Madden–Julian oscillation pulse, twin equatorial monsoonal troughs developed in the Northern and Southern Hemispheres. Although warm sea surface temperatures of 30 °C (86 °F) in the region favored development of a tropical cyclone, the southern trough developed substantially slower than the northern one. On December 19, the southern component was classified as Tropical Depression 03F by the Fiji Meteorological Service; at this time the depression was situated just east of the Solomon Islands. The northern component eventually developed into Typhoon Faxai, an extremely powerful Category 5 equivalent cyclone. Unlike Faxai, the precursor to Cyclone Waka developed slowly, mainly because of moderate wind shear in the region. Moving southeastward, the system gradually became more organized. On two occasions, the Joint Typhoon Warning Center (JTWC) issued a Tropical Cyclone Formation Alert; however, the agency later canceled them both times. By December 27, the depression had entered a region of lesser shear, favoring significant development of the system. The following day, the JTWC classified the system as Tropical Depression 07P, when the storm was situated roughly 640 km (400 mi) northwest of Pago Pago, American Samoa.

Tracking towards the southwest in response to a mid-level ridge to the southeast, the depression quickly intensified, attaining gale-force winds on December 29. Upon doing so, it was upgraded to a tropical cyclone and given the name Waka. Shortly thereafter, the storm underwent rapid intensification; roughly 24 hours after being named, Waka attained sustained winds of 120 km/h (75 mph). During December 30, the center of the storm brushed Wallis Island before turning towards the southeast and accelerating due to an approaching trough from the northwest. Continuing to intensify, Waka passed directly over Niuafo'ou on December 31 with winds of 150 km/h (93 mph). Later that day, the cyclone attained its peak intensity as a Category 4 severe tropical cyclone with ten-minute sustained winds of 185 km/h (115 km/h) and a barometric pressure of 930 mbar (hPa; 27.46 inHg). The JTWC assessed the storm to have attained similar one-minute sustained winds upon peaking; however, this was due to discrepancies between the two warning centers. At this time, Waka displayed a well-defined, circular eye roughly 60 km (37 mi) in diameter. Shortly after attaining its peak intensity, the center of Waka passed over Vava'u.

Continuing into the new year, Waka gradually weakened on January 1, 2002, as it entered a less favorable region for tropical cyclones. As a result, wind shear displaced convection from the center and its eyewall broke apart. Moving over decreasing sea surface temperatures, Waka began to undergo an extratropical transition, which it completed on January 2. Tracking southeastward, the remnant cyclone briefly slowed over open waters before again accelerating. Over the following few days, the system gradually weakened, with sustained winds decreasing below gale-force by January 5. The storm was last noted on January 6 near the Southern Ocean, about 2,200 km (1,400 mi) north-northwest of Antarctica, at which time it had a pressure of 972 mbar (972 hPa; 28.7 inHg).

== Preparations and impact ==
Wettest tropical cyclones and their remnants in Wallis and Futuna Highest-known totals
Precipitation			Storm	Location	Ref.
Rank	mm	in	Storm	Location	Ref.
1	674.9	26.57	Raja 1986	Maopoopo, Futuna Island	
2	556.7	21.92	Fran 1992	Hihifo, Wallis Island	
3	291.2	11.46	Val 1975	Hihifo, Wallis Island	
4	220.6	8.69	Hina 1997	Maopoopo, Futuna Island	
5	186.0	7.32	Evan 2012	Futuna Island	
6	180.0	7.09	Val 1980	Maopoopo, Futuna Island	
7	171.6	6.76	Keli 1997	Hihifo, Wallis Island	
8	160.8	6.33	Unnamed 1966	Malaetoli, Wallis Island	
9	160.0	6.30	Amos 2016	Hihifo, Wallis Island	
10	119.0	4.69	Waka 2001	Hihifo, Wallis Island	

=== Tonga ===
On December 30, just a day before Waka passed through Tonga, warnings were issued for numerous islands, including parts of Fiji and Samoa. Forecasts showed the storm passing directly over the low-lying Tongan capital of Nuku'alofa as a Category 3 cyclone. Owing to warnings from local media, all New Year's Eve celebrations were canceled as residents and tourists boarded up their homes. All airports in the region were shut down and ferry service was suspended. Many residents on the small island of Niuafo'ou, about 35 km^{2} (14 sq mi) in size, evacuated to other islands prior to Waka's arrival.

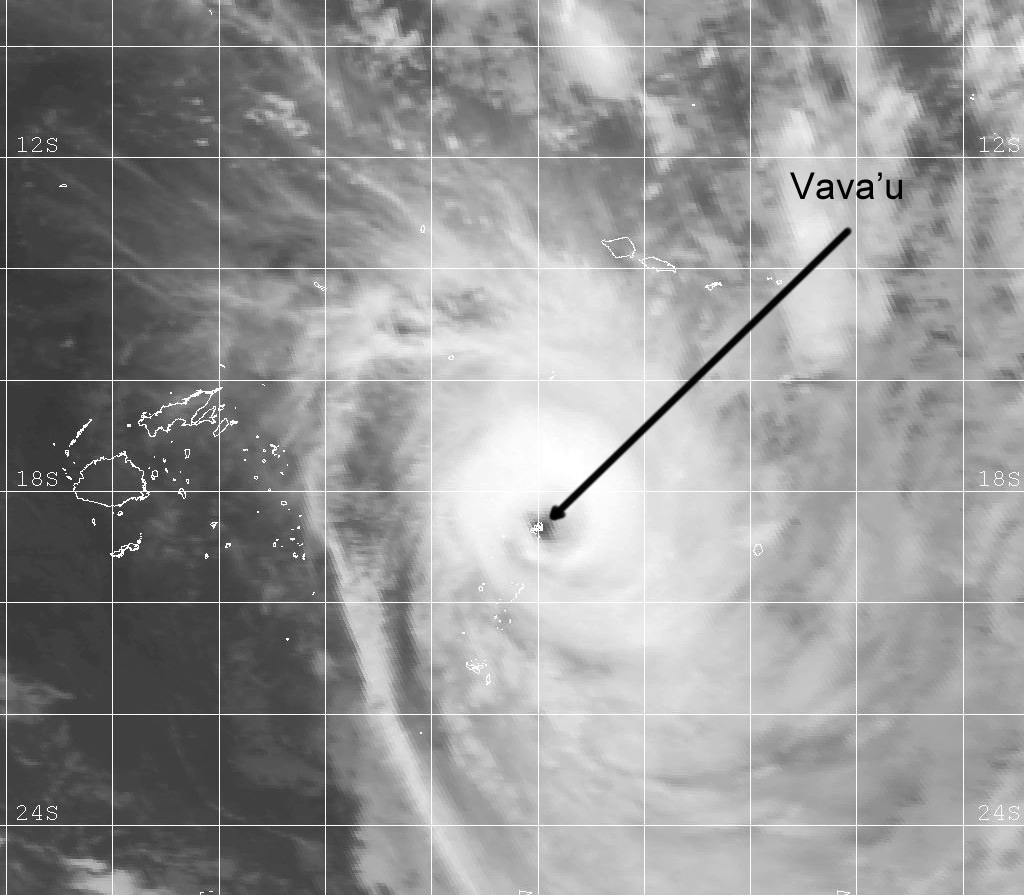
Infrared satellite image of Cyclone Waka passing directly over Vava'u on December 31

When the storm was moving through the islands of Tonga at peak strength, a few islands recorded hurricane-force winds; the city of Neiafu measured the strongest winds, peaking at 185 km/h (115 mph). In the southern islands, wind gusts up to 250 km/h (160 mph) affected isolated areas. In the Haʻapai islands, sustained winds reached 100 km/h (62 mph) and gusted to 140 km/h (87 mph). Heavy rains also fell during Waka's passage, amounting to over 200 mm (7.9 in) in Haʻapai.

Initial reports from Nukuʻalofa on December 31 indicated severe agricultural damage but few infrastructural losses. Following the passage of Waka, communication with Niuas and Vava'u were lost. According to local reports, high winds sandblasted Neiafu and downed nearly every tree. Surveys by the Red Cross revealed that roughly 200 homes in the city were severely damaged or destroyed and those left standing lost their roofs. Vava'u lost roughly 90% of its crops, including essential food crops such as taro, yams and bananas. In Ha'apai, one person died from cardiac arrest brought on by the storm. Fallen trees blocked numerous roads; power and water supplies were also interrupted to most residents. Severe damage also took place on Niuatoputapu where coastal homes were impacted by Waka's storm surge and several structures lost their roofs. In one instance, a yacht was brought onshore by the surge and crashed into a restaurant, destroying both.

According to damage surveys, 13 of the country's islands sustained damage; 470 homes and 6 schools were destroyed and hundreds more damaged. Damage throughout Tonga amounted to 104.2 million paʻanga ($51.3 million USD). In addition to infrastructural and public damage, the environment sustained catastrophic losses on Tonga. The Insular Flying Fox (Pteropus tonganus), a native species of bat, suffered great losses from Waka. Compared to pre-cyclone population levels, 79.8% (±9.9%) of the species was killed across six islands. This was due to widespread destruction of their natural food source, which decreased by 85% (±11.8%) following Waka. Trees across Vava'u were completely defoliated, although only 6.6% were killed, leaving no food for the bats. The greatest decline in bats was on Utula'aina Island at 95.7%; A'a Island sustained a complete loss of food-bearing plants. Six months after the storm, the bat population in Vava'u was still only 20% of the pre-storm level.

=== Elsewhere ===
During the cyclone's formative stages, it brought significant winds and swells to Tokelau, resulting in localized flooding and crop damage. American Samoa also experienced heavy rains, amounting to 56.9 mm (2.24 in), and gusts up to 90 km/h (56 mph). The winds downed a few trees and caused minor crop damage, with losses amounting to US$120,000. Large swells affected the island for roughly a week as the storm developed and moved away from the region. Cyclone Waka also affected Wallis and Futuna, prompting tropical cyclone watches and warnings from December 28 to 31, and later impacted Niue, prompting warnings there from December 30 to January 1. On Wallis Island, one home was destroyed and 50% of the banana crop was lost. A maximum of 112 mm (4.4 in) of rain fell in Hihifo during the passage of Waka. A wind gust of 126 km/h (78 mph) and swells up to 7 m (23 ft) were recorded in Wallis. Niue received more significant damage, experiencing a storm surge of up to 8 m (26 ft) and sea spray up to 100 m (330 ft) inland. Numerous fallen trees and power lines blocked roads and left southern areas of the island without power for roughly six hours. Damage in Niue amounted to US$10,000.

After moving through the Tongan islands, the remnants of Waka brought large swells, estimated up to 2.5 m (8.2 ft), to the North Island of New Zealand. Thousands of residents and tourists were in the region following the New Year's holiday. Meteorologists warned that the oceans would be increasingly dangerous and advised people not to venture into the water. Every lifeguard in Whangamatā, as well as former lifeguards, were called in to assist in keeping an estimated 8,000 people out of the water. Although most people stayed within a designated swimming area, several rescues had to be made. Rip currents also pulled 38 people out to sea in Mount Maunganui Main Beach; all were quickly rescued by lifeguards.

== Aftermath ==
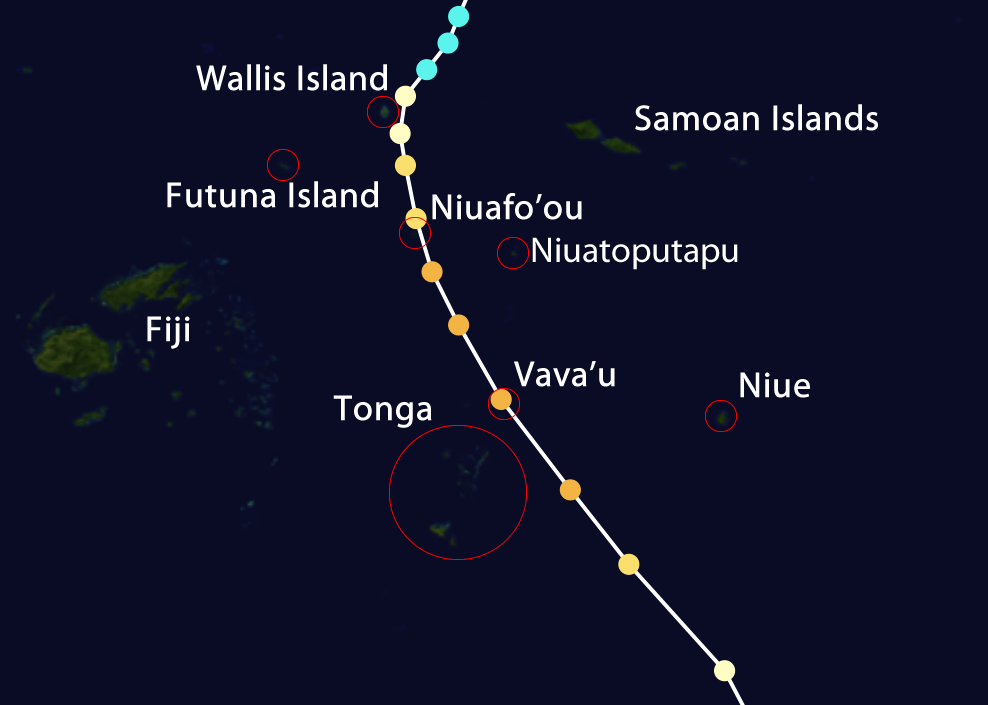
Enlarged track of Cyclone Waka between December 29 and January 1 depicting the storm's path in relation to several South Pacific islands.

Within a day of Cyclone Waka's passage in Tonga, the Government of New Zealand deployed an aircraft to survey the scale of damage and reestablish contact with the Tongan Islands. This aircraft was sent in accordance with the FRANZ Agreement, enacted in 1992, which states that assets from one country would be used in relief operations. On January 2, the head of Tonga's Disaster Office announced that they would likely need international assistance to recover from the storm. Due to the substantial damage to agriculture, food shortages were expected to impact the region over the following months. By January 7, the Red Cross began sending supplies to Tonga. Hundreds of tents and tarpaulins were brought in by an Australian AC-130 to help with the recovery process. On January 12, a New Zealand Lockheed C-130 Hercules carrying US$700,000 worth of supplies flew to the area to deliver aid. An additional US$700,000 was given in relief funds to repair damage wrought by the storm. Of this, US$500,000 would be used to repair schools that were damaged or destroyed and the remaining US$200,000 would be used for emergency lighting, cooking and food supply recovery.

Further funds came from the United States Agency for International Development, which offered US$25,000 by mid-January. The French Polynesian assembly in Tahiti also provided US$770,000 worth of relief supplies and aid. The main industry of Tonga, tourism, was devastated by the storm as no tourists were allowed to travel to the region for at least two weeks after Waka's passage. The Government of Tonga requested a total of US$39.2 million in international aid, most of which was dedicated to rehabilitation of infrastructure. Medical supplies and personnel were later deployed by the World Health Organization. In early March, a relief fund based on donations was set up by the United Methodist Committee on Relief to provide US$210,000 for 30 families impacted by the storm. About 180 people were given assistance in rebuilding their homes by the Church World Service later that month. As food shortages became severe in April, emergency supplies were sent to the outlying Niuas islands of Tonga. In May, US$5.85 million was approved for emergency funds by the World Bank to assist in infrastructural rehabilitation.

Vava'u suffered a tremendous decrease in agricultural exports due to Waka, dropping 86.5% from the previous year. Despite substantial agricultural losses, the sector ended up expanding roughly 2% by the end of 2002 and the overall economy grew by 2.9%. Owing to the severity of damage wrought by the cyclone, the World Meteorological Organization retired the name Waka following its using.

== See also ==
- 2001–02 South Pacific cyclone season
