= Cyclone Evan =

Category 4 cyclone in the South Pacific in 2012

Severe Tropical Cyclone Evan
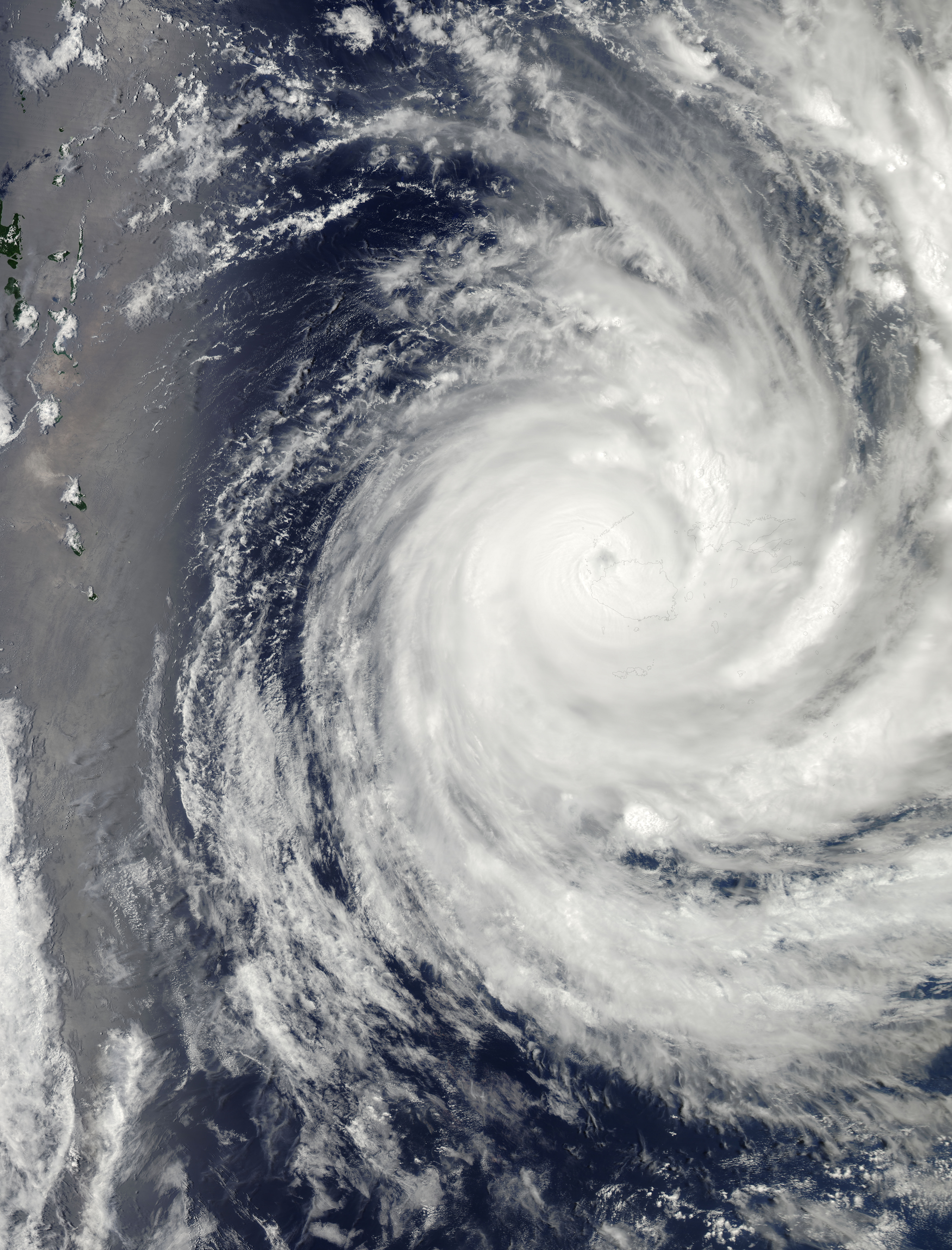
- Cyclone Evan just off the western coast of Fiji on 17 December

Meteorological history
- Formed: December 9, 2012
- Extratropical: December 19, 2012
- Dissipated: December 27, 2012

Category 4 severe tropical cyclone
- 10-minute sustained (FMS)
- Highest winds: 185 km/h (115 mph)
- Lowest pressure: 943 hPa (mbar); 27.85 inHg

Category 4-equivalent tropical cyclone
- 1-minute sustained (SSHWS/JTWC)
- Highest winds: 230 km/h (145 mph)
- Lowest pressure: 929 hPa (mbar); 27.43 inHg

Overall effects
- Fatalities: 14 confirmed
- Damage: $313 million (2012 USD)
- Areas affected: Samoa, American Samoa, Wallis and Futuna, Fiji, Tonga, New Zealand
- IBTrACS
- Part of the 2012–13 South Pacific cyclone season

Severe Tropical Cyclone Evan was considered to be the worst tropical cyclone to affect the island nation of Samoa since Cyclone Val in 1991 and was the strongest storm to impact the main South Pacific islands until Winston in 2016. The system was first noted on 9 December 2012, as a weak tropical depression about 700 km (435 mi) to the northeast of Suva, Fiji. Over the next couple of days, the depression gradually developed further before it was named Evan on 12 December, as it had fully developed into a tropical cyclone. During that day the system moved toward the Samoan Islands and gradually intensified, before the system slowed and severely affected the Samoan Islands during the next day with wind gusts of up to 210 km/h (130 mph).

The storm moved east and impacted the French islands of Wallis and Futuna before affecting Samoa and American Samoa. On 16 December, Evan turned to the south and paralleled western areas of Fiji.

== Meteorological history ==
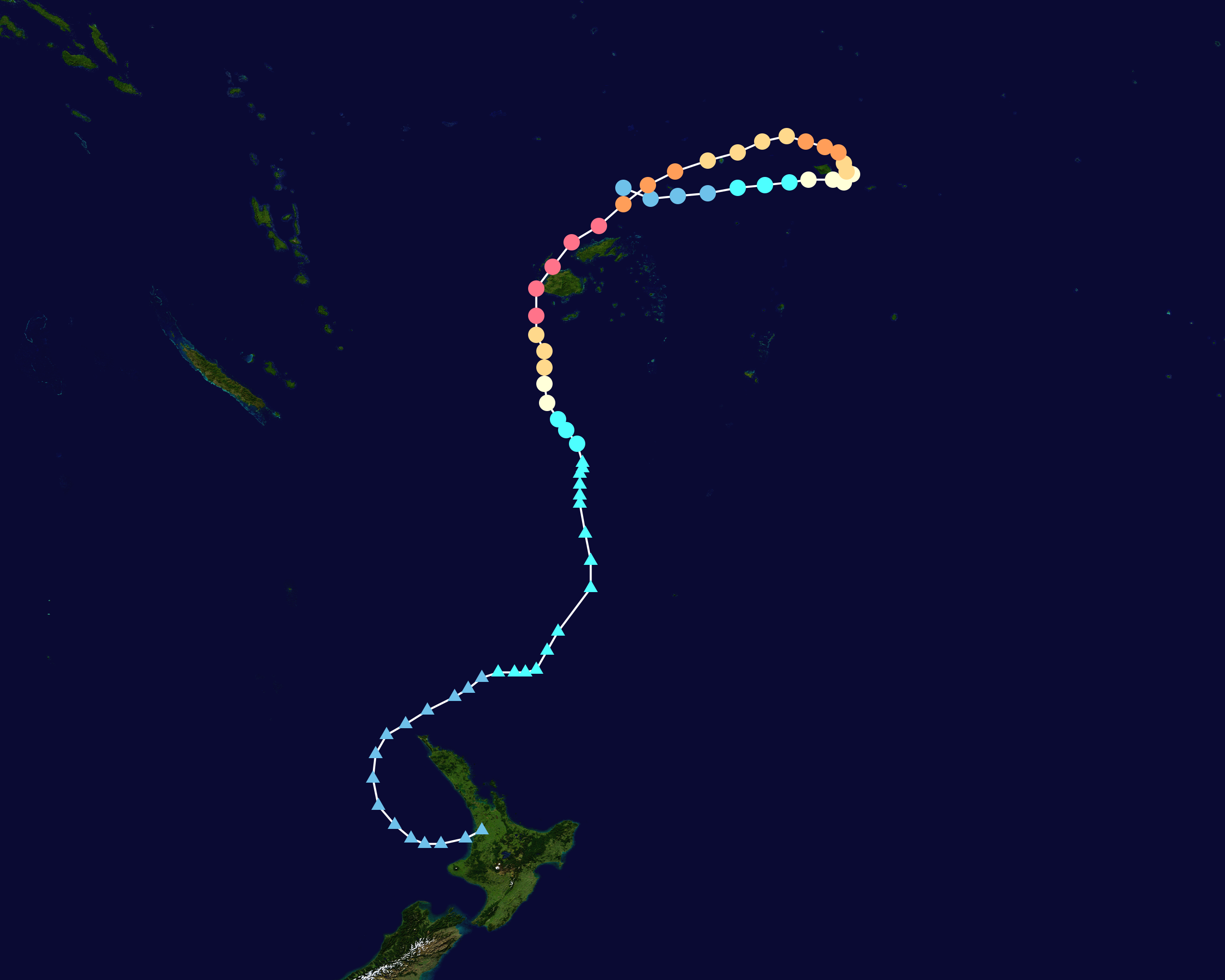
Map plotting the storm's track and intensity, according to the Saffir–Simpson scale Map key Saffir–Simpson scale Tropical depression (≤38 mph, ≤62 km/h) Tropical storm (39–73 mph, 63–118 km/h) Category 1 (74–95 mph, 119–153 km/h) Category 2 (96–110 mph, 154–177 km/h) Category 3 (111–129 mph, 178–208 km/h) Category 4 (130–156 mph, 209–251 km/h) Category 5 (≥157 mph, ≥252 km/h) Unknown Storm type Tropical cyclone Subtropical cyclone Extratropical cyclone, remnant low, tropical disturbance, or monsoon depression

The tropical depression that was to become Severe Tropical Cyclone Evan was first noted by the Fiji Meteorological Service (FMS) on 9 December, while it was located within the South Pacific Convergence Zone near the Fijian dependency of Rotuma. At this stage, the system's broad low-level circulation was poorly organised, while the majority of atmospheric convection was fragmented and located over its northeastern quadrant. Over the next day, the system subsequently moved south-eastwards within an area favourable for further development, with low vertical windshear, sea surface temperatures of 29–30 °C (84–86 °F) and favourable outflow. During 11 December, the systems low-level circulation centre started to rapidly consolidate, as it passed around 55 km (35 mi) to the southwest of the French Territory of Futuna. Later that day as the depression became equivalent to a tropical storm and develop a small eye on microwave imagery, the United States Joint Typhoon Warning Center initiated advisories on the system and designated it as Tropical Cyclone 04P. This was followed by the FMS naming the system as Evan the following day, after it had become a Category 1 tropical cyclone on the Australian tropical cyclone intensity scale.

After the system was named, the upper-level ridge continued to steer Evan eastward, toward the Samoan islands, as the cyclone quickly intensified. By 12 December, as the system started to impact the Samoan Islands with gale and storm force wind speeds, RSMC Nadi reported that the system had become a category 2 tropical cyclone with 10-minute sustained wind speeds of 90 km/h (55 mph). The JTWC also reported that day that the system had become equivalent to a category 1 hurricane on the Saffir-Simpson hurricane scale (SSHS) with 1-minute sustained wind speeds of 120 km/h (75 mph). Over the next 12 hours, the system developed a 17 km (11 mi) cloud-filled eye on visible imagery, while the system's forward motion started to slow down as it entered a weak steering environment with the upper-level ridge of high pressure to the north of the system weakened and a subtropical ridge of high pressure developed to the south of the system.

The system continued to intensify and began to re-curve toward the west on 16 December; at 18:00 UTC (07:00 UTC+13, 17 December) the JTWC reported that Evan had reached an intensity of 185 km/h (115 mph), which made it equivalent to a category 3 hurricane on the SSHS.

Early on 17 December, the JTWC reported that Cyclone Evan had reached its peak intensity with 1-minute windspeeds of 230 km/h (145 mph), which made it equivalent to a category 4 hurricane on the SSHS. During that day Evan started to gradually weaken as it moved around the coast of the Fijian island of Viti Levu. With RSMC Nadi reporting by 18:00 UTC (07:00 UTC+13, 18 December) that the system had weakened into a category 3 severe tropical cyclone.

By 19 December, wind shear from the northwest had exposed the system's low level circulation center completely, pushing the bulk of convection and thunderstorm activity about 120 km (75 mi) to the southeast of the center. Evan had also moved into cooler sea surface temperatures, below 27 °C (81 °C), so evaporation and thunderstorm development had waned, leading to falling cloud heights because of less moisture.

Later that same day, RSMC Nadi reported that Cyclone Evan had weakened below cyclone intensity and declassified it as a tropical cyclone, before the JTWC issued their final warning later that day as the system started to transition into an extratropical cyclone. Over the next couple of days the remnant low continued moving southwards and moved below 25°S and into the Wellington tropical cyclone warning centre's (TCWC Wellington area of responsibility. During 21 December, the system started to move towards the southwest as it directed a moist tropical airmass onto the North Island during the next day. The remnants of Evan were last noted by TCWC Wellington during 25 December.

== Preparations and impact ==
Severe Tropical Cyclone Evan impacted the island nations of Wallis and Futuna, Samoa, American Samoa, Niue, Tonga, Fiji and New Zealand, with 14 deaths reported and total damages estimated at over US$315 million. As a result of its impact on the island nations, the name Evan was subsequently retired, from the list of names for the region by the World Meteorological Organization.

=== Fiji ===
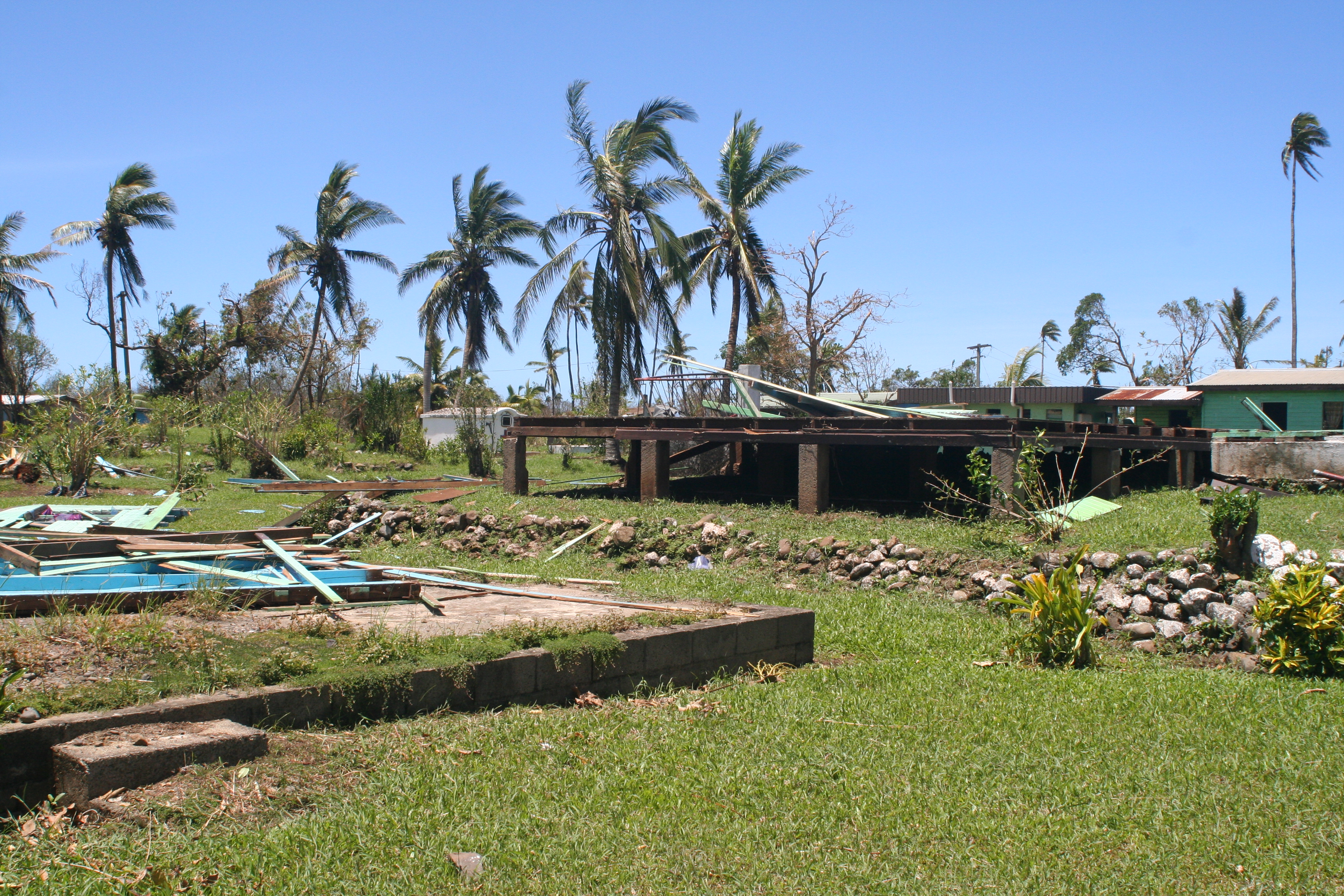
Buildings flattened by the storm in Fiji

On 10 December, the FMS issued heavy rain warnings for parts of Fiji, as the trough of low pressure associated with the system, was bringing heavy rain and squally thunderstorms to parts of Fiji which they warned could lead to flash floods in parts of the archipelago. These warnings were subsequently cancelled during the next day as the system moved away from Fiji, however they started to note that the global numerical weather guidance products were agreeing on the depression, re-curving as a tropical cyclone and to start directly impacting Fiji from 16 December. During the next three days, the FMS issued calls for communities to be prepared, heed warnings and act responsibly, so that they could avoid "unnecessary loss of lives and properties", as Cyclone Evan was expected to be at least a Category 4 Severe Tropical Cyclone when it entered Fijian waters. From 15 to 18 December, as the system approached and passed through the archipelago, the FMS issued various strong, gale, storm and hurricane-force wind warnings for Fiji.

Ahead of the system approaching and impacting the island nation, people were evacuated to emergency shelters. Fiji Airways (Air Pacific) announced they are suspending all flights to Savusavu, as well as the international flights from Nadi to Auckland and Brisbane on 16 December.

Upon passing over Fiji, over 8,000 people were living in shelters, including many tourists. Although there were no initial reports of casualties, the storm brought considerable damage. Trees and power lines were down across the island group. In addition, flooding and structural damage was reported from resorts and homes.

Damage throughout Fiji amounted to FJ$169.9 million (US$108.8 million). Additionally, short-term economic losses related to the cyclone were estimated reach FJ$73.4 million (US$40.9 million).

=== Wallis and Futuna ===
Wettest tropical cyclones and their remnants in Wallis and Futuna Highest-known totals
Precipitation			Storm	Location	Ref.
Rank	mm	in	Storm	Location	Ref.
1	674.9	26.57	Raja 1986	Maopoopo, Futuna Island	
2	556.7	21.92	Fran 1992	Hihifo, Wallis Island	
3	291.2	11.46	Val 1975	Hihifo, Wallis Island	
4	220.6	8.69	Hina 1997	Maopoopo, Futuna Island	
5	186.0	7.32	Evan 2012	Futuna Island	
6	180.0	7.09	Val 1980	Maopoopo, Futuna Island	
7	171.6	6.76	Keli 1997	Hihifo, Wallis Island	
8	160.8	6.33	Unnamed 1966	Malaetoli, Wallis Island	
9	160.0	6.30	Amos 2016	Hihifo, Wallis Island	
10	119.0	4.69	Waka 2001	Hihifo, Wallis Island	

Cyclone Evan affected Wallis and Futuna on two separate occasions while it was active, with the cyclone first affecting Futuna during 11 December, before passing within 20 km (10 mi) of Wallis Island on 15 December, and 70 km (45 mi) of Futuna Island during the next day. On 11 December, Futuna Island recorded 186 mm (7.3 in) of rainfall and wind speeds of up to 55 km/h (35 mph) as Evan passed just to the north of the island. Ahead of the system affecting the French Territory for the second time, various warning alerts were issued for the two islands, with people were urged to prepare. As the system passed near Wallis island, wind gusts of up to 156 km/h (97 mph) were recorded, which were the highest recorded wind gusts on Wallis Island since records began in 1971. The cyclone passed through the French territory without any reported casualties, and while Futuna Island was spared any major damage, extensive damage was reported on Wallis Island.

=== Samoa ===
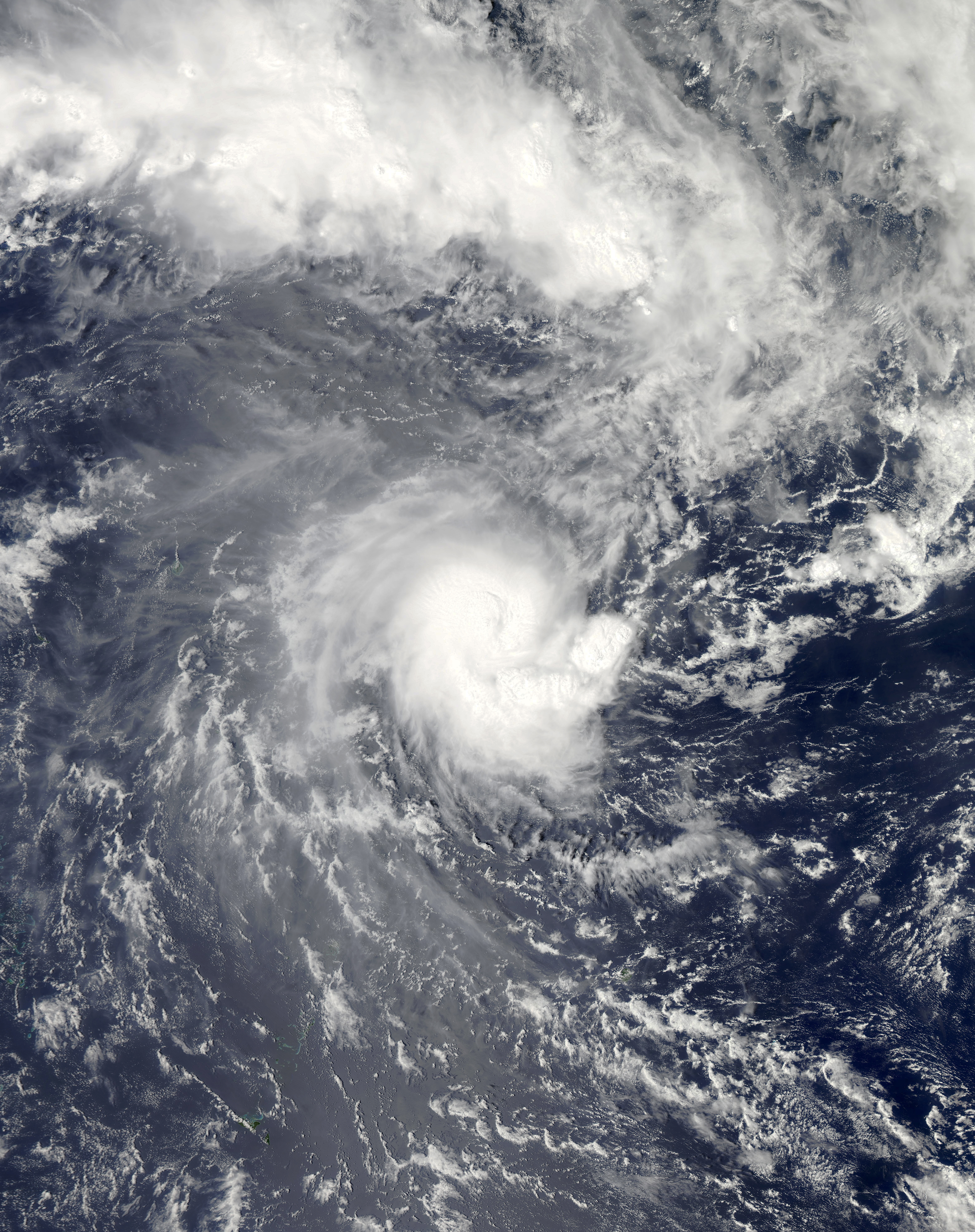
Cyclone Evan nearing the coast of Upolu, Samoa on 13 December

Cyclone Evan affected the independent state of Samoa between 11 and 15 December, and was considered to be the worst tropical cyclone to affect Samoa, since Cyclone Val in 1991. After the system was named on 12 December, the Samoan Deputy and Acting Prime Minister Fonotoe Pierre Lauofo, signed a Disaster Declaration which lasted for 48 hours and activated all disaster response provisions of the Samoan National Disaster Management Plan. During that day the Samoa Meteorology Division issued gale and storm force wind warnings and a hurricane watch for Samoa, while preparations for the system started with several people boarding up their homes. During the next day these preparations continued before the SMS issued a hurricane warning for Upolu, after marginal hurricane-force winds of 114 km/h (71 mph) were observed on Mount Fiamoe, Upolu.

The cyclone struck, causing widespread damage in the capital, Apia. Many of the roads were blocked by flood waters and downed banana trees. Evan also caused damage to Faleolo International Airport in Apia, where the departures lounge collapsed, forcing its temporary closure. As a result, Fiji Airways (Air Pacific) cancelled all flights to Apia for 14 and 15 December, citing safety concerns. Wind gusts of up to 210 km/h (130 mph) were reported. The storm destroyed houses and caused almost complete failures in the power and water supply systems. The Disaster Management Office reported that the Tanugamanono power plant was heavily damaged, and power might not be restored for up to two months in some areas. A water treatment plant near Apia was also reported destroyed. At least three deaths were reported after the storm, including two children who were in low-lying areas and drowned. Authorities expressed concern over about the fate of at least 7 people who are still missing, as well as up to 3,000 others now living in emergency shelters.

Costliest South Pacific Ocean tropical cyclones
Rank	Tropical cyclones	Season	Damage USD	Refs
1	3 Gabrielle	2022–23	$9.2 billion	
2	TD 06F	2022–23	$1.43 billion	
3	5 Winston	2015–16	$1.4 billion	
4	5 Harold	2019–20	$768 million	
5	5 Pam	2014–15	$543 million	
6	5 Judy and Kevin	2022–23	$433 million	
7	4 Val	1991–92	$381 million	
8	5 Lola	2023–24	$352 million	
9	4 Evan	2012–13	$313 million	
10	4 Gita	2017–18	$253 million	

The US Ambassador to New Zealand and Samoa David Huebner confirmed the United States had provided NZ$60,000 to the Samoan Red Cross for relief operations. New Zealand authorities said they were also ready to provide financial aid, if the local government requests it. On 15 December, they did provide NZ$50,000, as well as a P-3 Orion plane to search for eight missing fishermen. Two days later the New Zealand Foreign Affairs Minister Murray McCully announced an additional NZ$550,000 was to be made available to the Samoan government, as well as the Samoan Red Cross and any agencies on the ground that might need it. Five additional New Zealand Red Cross workers were also sent to support local efforts. The Samoan Parliament opened with a somber prayer session, as the legislators prepared to receive initial assessments of the economic damage wrecked by Evan. According to reports, the bill is expected to be at least NZ$200,000,000, and possibly rise as high as 300 million.

On 17 December, Samoan authorities confirmed that the death toll reached 14, after rescuers abandoned the search for 10 missing sailors. In all, damage from the storm amounted to WS$465 million (US$204 million).

=== American Samoa ===
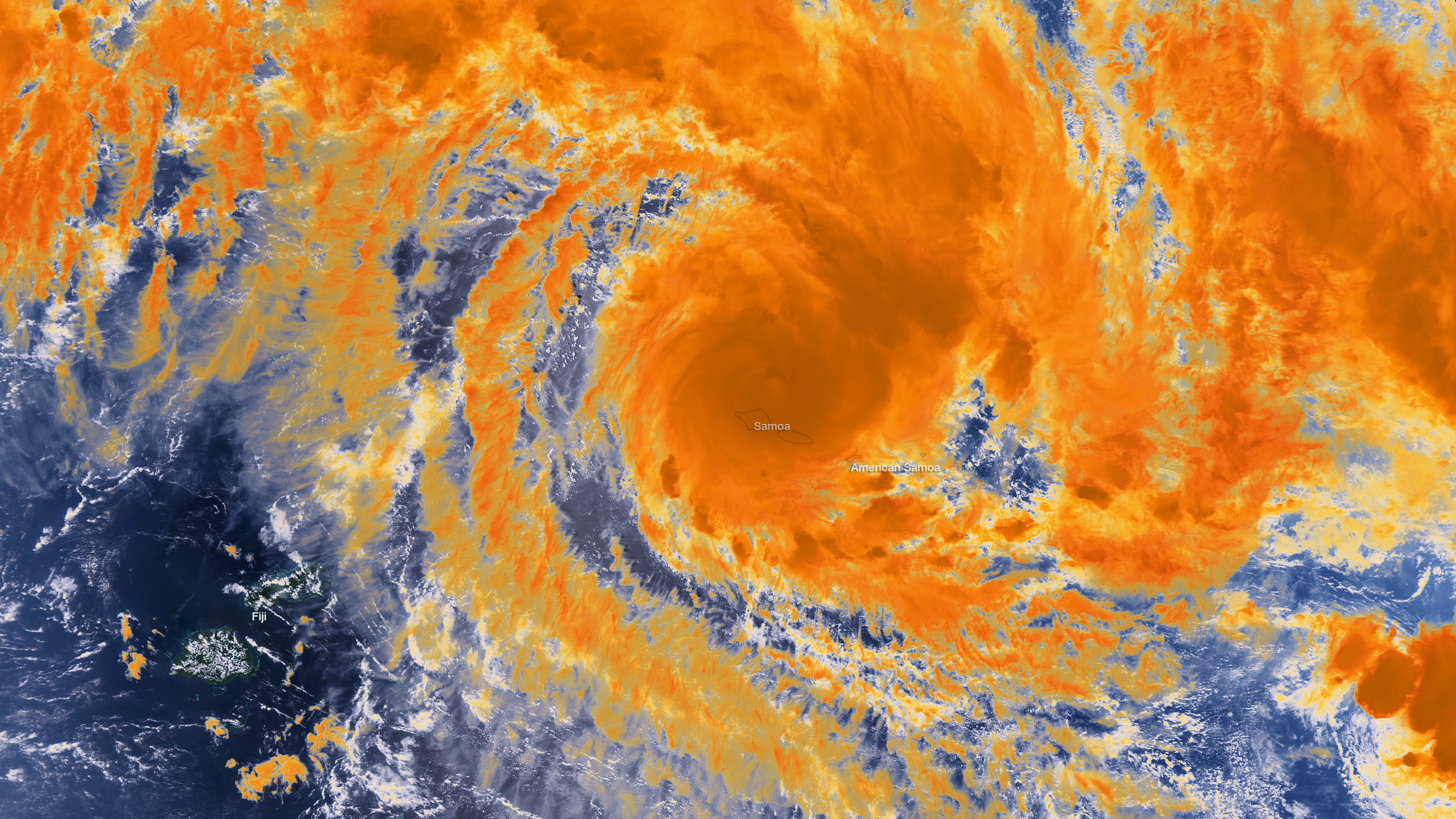
Enhanced infrared image of Evan on 14 December

The Pago Pago National Weather Service Forecast Office issued a gale watch for all of American Samoa a day before the storm impacted the island. As Evan intensified and moved closer to the archipelago, hurricane warnings and flash flood watches were issued for Tutuila, Aunuu, Manua and Swains Island. On 14 December, authorities announced that there had been no major damage or injuries after the passage of the storm.

=== Tonga ===
On 12 December, the FMS issued a tropical cyclone alert for the Tongan Islands Niuatoputapu and Niuafo'ou as it was thought that Evan might cause gale-force winds over the islands within 48 hours. During 14 December, the alert was cancelled as Evan was no longer predicted to pass close enough to the islands to produce gale force winds or any damage on either island.

=== New Zealand ===
During 23 December, as Cyclone Evan's remnants moved towards New Zealand, TCWC Wellington issued Severe Weather Warnings for parts of Northland, Auckland and Coromandel as between 70–100 mm (2.8–3.9 in) of rain expected to fall which could cause surface flooding. They also predicted that parts of New Zealand would see strong or gale-force winds and that the eastern coasts of Northland, might see large sea waves of about 3–4 metres (9.8–13.1 ft). During that day in parts of the Coromandel Ranges, over 100 mm (3.9 in) of rain fell while in other parts of the warning area 25–50 mm (0.98–1.97 in) fell while the system was blamed for creating foggy conditions that engulfed parts of the North Island, and led to over 100 flights being cancelled at Wellington Airport. On 24 December, the threat of heavy rain, surface flooding, swells and strong to gale-force winds continued while a swimmer drowned in rough seas of Whiritoa beach. During that day heavy rain and the threat of flooding gradually eased, before the remnants were last noted during the next day.

== See also ==
- Tropical cyclones in 2012
- Cyclone Raja (1986–87)
- Cyclone Ofa (1990)
- Cyclone Kina (1992–93)
- Cyclone Daman (2007)
