= Cyclone Raja =

1986–1987 South Pacific cyclone

Severe Tropical Cyclone Raja
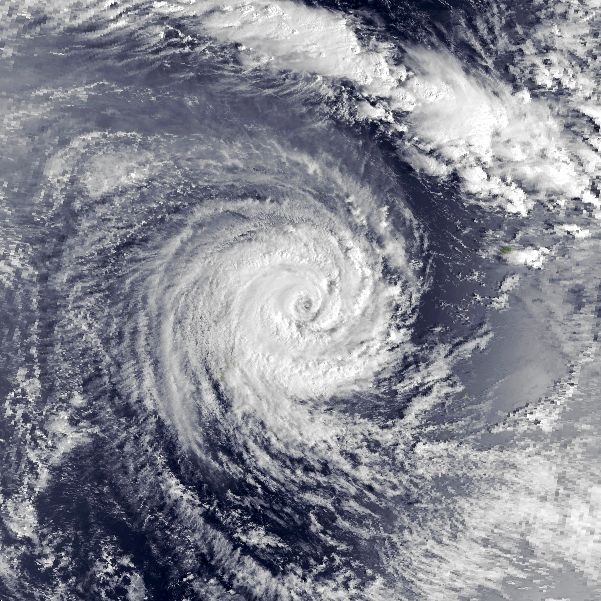
- Cyclone Raja on 28 December

Meteorological history
- Formed: 21 December 1986
- Extratropical: 1 January 1987
- Dissipated: 5 January 1987

Category 3 severe tropical cyclone
- 10-minute sustained (MetService)
- Highest winds: 150 km/h (90 mph)
- Lowest pressure: 955 hPa (mbar); 28.20 inHg

Category 2-equivalent tropical cyclone
- 1-minute sustained (SSHWS/NPMOC)
- Highest winds: 165 km/h (105 mph)
- Lowest pressure: 953 hPa (mbar); 28.14 inHg

Overall effects
- Fatalities: 2 confirmed
- Damage: $14 million (1987 USD)
- Areas affected: Fiji, Tonga, Tuvalu, Wallis and Futuna
- IBTrACS
- Part of the 1986–87 South Pacific cyclone season

Severe Tropical Cyclone Raja is the tropical cyclone that holds the 24-hour rainfall record of 674.9 mm (26.57 in) for the French Overseas Territory of Wallis and Futuna. The system was first noted by the Fiji Meteorological Service (FMS) as a weak tropical disturbance northeast of Tokelau in mid-December 1986. The system developed further as it moved southwest over the next few days, and it was classified as Tropical Cyclone Raja on 23 December. The newly named system slowed and unexpectedly recurved southeast towards the French territory of Wallis and Futuna on 24 December. Over the next two days, Raja interacted with what would become Severe Tropical Cyclone Sally and executed a tight loop, passing within 55 km (35 mi) of Futuna. The system peaked as a Category 3 severe tropical cyclone on 28 December, with estimated 10-minute sustained winds of 90 mph (150 km/h). The storm turned southwest the next day and threatened Fiji, where it passed within 20 km (10 mi) of Vanua Levu and near (or over) several smaller islands in the Lau group during the following day. Raja gradually weakened over the next few days as it moved south of Fiji; it was last noted on 5 January 1987 after it filled up over the north Tasman Sea.

Raja caused one death as it impacted the island nations of Tuvalu, Wallis and Futuna, Tonga and Fiji. Gusty winds and rough seas associated with the system caused extensive damage to crops, coastal installations and buildings in Tuvalu, and flooded low-lying areas. The island of Futuna was the worst hit, with crops, coastal installations and buildings damaged or destroyed by the system. Raja affected the main islands of Fiji twice between 24 and 30 December, and was responsible for the worst flood of the Labasa River since 1929. As a result of the damage to Fiji and portions of Polynesia, the name Raja was retired from the South Pacific naming lists.

== Meteorological history ==
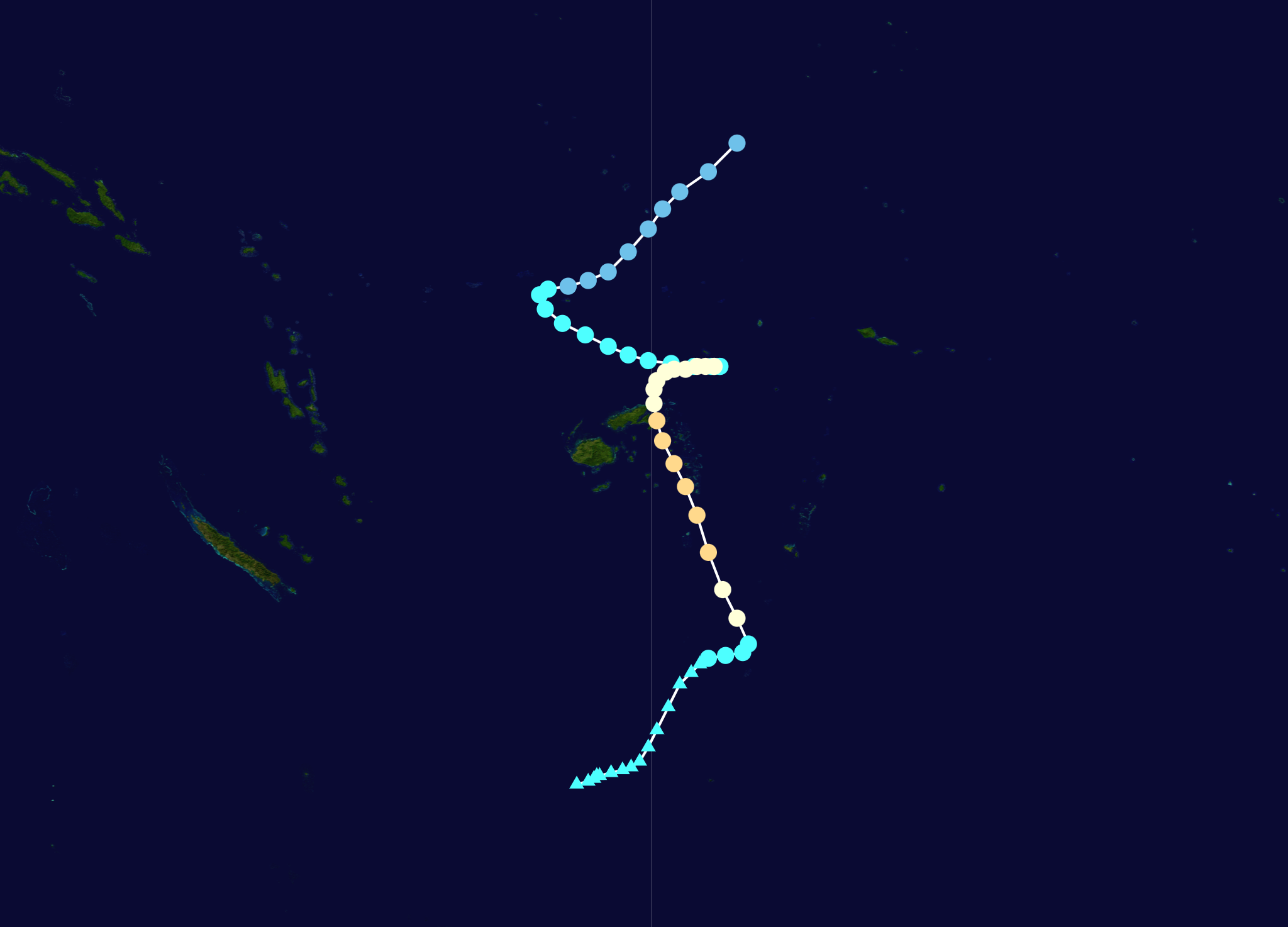
Map plotting the storm's track and intensity, according to the Saffir–Simpson scale Map key Saffir–Simpson scale Tropical depression (≤38 mph, ≤62 km/h) Tropical storm (39–73 mph, 63–118 km/h) Category 1 (74–95 mph, 119–153 km/h) Category 2 (96–110 mph, 154–177 km/h) Category 3 (111–129 mph, 178–208 km/h) Category 4 (130–156 mph, 209–251 km/h) Category 5 (≥157 mph, ≥252 km/h) Unknown Storm type Tropical cyclone Subtropical cyclone Extratropical cyclone, remnant low, tropical disturbance, or monsoon depression

The South Pacific convergence zone was active in the middle of December 1986, with a mid-latitude upper-level trough of low pressure which extended into the tropics. A westerly wind burst between Tokelau and Kanton Island resulted in a tropical disturbance developing to the northeast of Tokelau. The Fiji Meteorological Service (FMS) began to monitor the disturbance as a shallow tropical depression on 21 December, when the system was about 280 km (175 mi) east of the island of Funafuti, Tuvalu. (Note: The Fiji Meteorological Service is the Regional Specialised Meteorological Centre for the South Pacific Ocean, between the equator and 25°S and from 160°E to 120°W.) At that time, the system was beyond the range of any reporting stations; its circulation was weak and ill-defined, which meant that there was considerable uncertainty about the location of its center. The depression moved southwest and passed near the Tuvaluan atoll of Nukufetau, as it slowly deepened and organised over the next 36 hours.

After the system was named Tropical Cyclone Raja by the FMS on 23 December; the United States Naval Western Oceanography Center (NWOC) initiated advisories on the system and designated it as Tropical Cyclone 04P. (Note: The Naval Western Oceanography Center issued tropical-cyclone warnings on behalf of the United States Department of Defense between 180° and the West Coast.) During that day, the system slowed as it approached Rotuma; the subtropical ridge of high pressure weakened, and widespread falling pressure was recorded across the Pacific. Raja then unexpectedly re-curved southeast and began moving towards the French territory of Wallis and Futuna on 24 December. Satellite imagery the next day indicated that the system had developed an eye, and it passed within 55 km (35 mi) of Futuna. Raja reached hurricane strength on 26 December, as it slowed and began to interact with what would become Severe Tropical Cyclone Sally. Over the next two days, Raja approached to within 1,110 km (690 mi) of Sally in an anticlockwise cyclonic loop as it continued to intensify. The system also passed about 110 km (70 mi) southeast of Futuna, as it re-curved east and began to threaten Fiji.

The FMS estimated on 28 December that Raja had peaked with 10-minute sustained winds of 90 mph (150 km/h), which made it a Category 3 severe tropical cyclone on the Australian tropical cyclone intensity scale. The system turned southwest that day, in response to a trough of low pressure developing over (and south of) Raja and Sally. It passed within 20 km (10 mi) of Cikobia and Udu Point on Vanua Levu on 29 December, before it passed over or near several smaller Fijian islands in the Lau Group while beginning to turn south. The NWOC estimated that Raja had peaked in intensity at this time with one-minute sustained wind speeds of 105 mph (165 km/h), which made it equivalent to a Category 2 hurricane on the Saffir-Simpson hurricane wind scale. Over the next few days, Raja gradually weakened as it moved over cooler waters south of Fiji and its outflow became restricted before it degenerated into a depression during 1 January. The depression subsequently passed under a subtropical jet and moved west, where it became part of a blocking pattern over New Zealand. The system was last noted on 5 January, after filling over the north Tasman Sea.

== Effects ==
Severe Tropical Cyclone Raja was responsible for a single death as it impacted Fiji and parts of Polynesia, before its name was later retired from the South Pacific lists of tropical cyclone names. When the FMS began monitoring Raja as a tropical depression on 21 December, they issued a tropical cyclone alert for Tuvalu. Although the system moved southwest and affected Tuvalu as expected, it failed to deepen as quickly as anticipated. However, its strong, gusty winds and high seas caused extensive damage to crops, coastal installations and buildings and flooded low-lying areas on the island nation.

Raja was expected to begin moving southeast after it passed near Rotuma on 24 December, which prompted the FMS to issue a tropical cyclone alert for the Tongan islands of Niuafoʻou and Keppel. Gale warnings were issued on 25 December for the two islands and remained in place until 28 December, when the system had turned southwest and moved well away from the islands. A tropical cyclone alert was issued for the islands of southern Tonga on 29 December, when the possibility arose that Raja would turn southeast and affect central and southern Tonga. A gale warning was subsequently issued for Tongatapu and the Nomuka group of islands before all warnings for Tonga were cancelled on 30 December.

=== Wallis and Futuna ===
Wettest tropical cyclones and their remnants in Wallis and Futuna Highest-known totals
Precipitation			Storm	Location	Ref.
Rank	mm	in	Storm	Location	Ref.
1	674.9	26.57	Raja 1986	Maopoopo, Futuna Island	
2	556.7	21.92	Fran 1992	Hihifo, Wallis Island	
3	291.2	11.46	Val 1975	Hihifo, Wallis Island	
4	220.6	8.69	Hina 1997	Maopoopo, Futuna Island	
5	186.0	7.32	Evan 2012	Futuna Island	
6	180.0	7.09	Val 1980	Maopoopo, Futuna Island	
7	171.6	6.76	Keli 1997	Hihifo, Wallis Island	
8	160.8	6.33	Unnamed 1966	Malaetoli, Wallis Island	
9	160.0	6.30	Amos 2016	Hihifo, Wallis Island	
10	119.0	4.69	Waka 2001	Hihifo, Wallis Island	

Raja impacted the French overseas territory of Wallis and Futuna on 25–29 December, and was responsible for one death as well as extensive damage to the islands' crops, coastal installations and buildings. A storm warning was issued by the FMS for Futuna on 24 December and remained in place until 28 December while the system made a cyclonic loop near the island. The system brought gale-force winds to Wallis, and was thought to have brought hurricane-force winds to Futuna; this could not be verified since the weather station was blown down. It also generated high seas, flooding, landslides and a storm surge which damaged Futuna's grass airstrip. On 26 December, a record 24-hour rainfall total of 674.9 mm (26.57 in) and a minimum pressure of 969.2 hectopascals (28.62 inHg) were recorded at the Maopoopo weather station on Futuna. The Maopoopo station also recorded a wind gust of 133 km/h (83 mph) before its anemometer was destroyed, and a record wind gust of 137 km/h (85 mph) was recorded in Wallis' Hihifo District. The record was broken during Severe Tropical Cyclone Evan in December 2012, when a wind gust of 156 km/h (97 mph) was recorded at the Hihifo aerodrome.

Communications between the islands were lost on 27 December, before an intermittent radio link was established later that day to transmit damage reports. The reports indicated that Futuna was the worst affected, with severe damage reported to well-built houses; less well-built houses were completely destroyed. About 80 percent of the island's crops were destroyed, and the territorial administration building, police headquarters and hospital were severely damaged. The radio link failed on 28 December and Futuna was cut off from the rest of the world. Relief supplies, including food, medical supplies and other materials, were immediately dispatched from French Polynesia and New Caledonia. Two Transall military transport aircraft attempting to deliver 16 tonnes (16,000 kg) of relief materials to Futuna were diverted to Wallis due to poor visibility. Plans were made to transport some of the aid on the cargo ship Mona-III when the seas surrounding the islands subsided.

Aid arrived on Futuna on 31 December after a dismantled Puma aircraft was airlifted to Wallis from New Caledonia, reassembled and flown to the island. The aircraft, which also carried French Secretary of State for the South Pacific Gaston Flosse, evacuated seriously injured individuals to Wallis. On 1 January, the French Navy ship Jacques-Cartier left Noumea with earth-moving equipment for Futuna. During a 24-hour visit to the island nation on 6–7 February 1987, French Minister of Overseas Departments and Territories Bernard Pons announced that Futuna would receive FF55 million (US$8 million) in aid and the ban on aid to Vanuatu was overturned. (Note: This total, originally reported in French francs, was converted to United States dollars on the Fxtop website.) A military detachment was deployed to the islands to assist in rehabilitating the main infrastructure the day after the minister's visit. The European Economic Community supplemented the French funds, providing ₠60,000 from the European Development Fund for Construction and enabling the replacement of fishing boats destroyed by the cyclone. It took the island nation about five years to rebuild and recover from Raja's effects.

=== Fiji ===
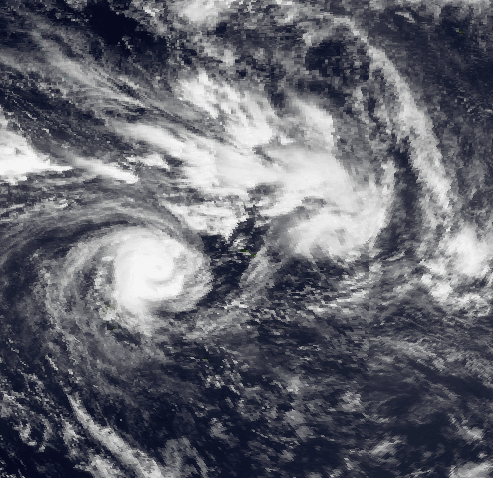
Tropical Cyclone Raja (left) and the precursor to Sally (right) interacting on 26 December

Raja impacted Fiji between 24 and 30 December, where it was responsible for FJ$16 million (US$14 million) in damage, one death and the worst flood of the Labasa River since 1929. It was considered to be one of the worst tropical cyclones on record to hit Fiji. On 23 December, the FMS issued a tropical cyclone alert for the Fijian dependency of Rotuma and warned that gale-force winds were possible on the island within the next 24 hours. The FMS issued a storm warning for Rotuma and a tropical cyclone alert for the rest of Fiji later that day, since it was thought that the system would continue moving southeast towards the island nation. Raja passed west of Rotuma on 24 December, and gale-force winds and extensive damage to houses, vehicles, coastal roads and crops were reported. The tropical cyclone alert was gradually replaced that day with a gale warning for islands in Fiji's Northern Division the following day, since Raja was expected to pass close enough to trigger gale-force winds.

The system passed 90–110 km (55–70 mi) northwest of the Udu Point meteorological station on 25 December, with estimated winds of 45–55 km/h (30–35 mph). All warnings were gradually cancelled by the FMS on 25 and 26 December, as Raja moved east towards the Tongan island of Niuafo'ou. It became clear that the storm posed another threat to Fiji on 27 December, since it had begun moving west the previous day. Fiji was put on alert and the FMS issued gale warnings for several islands, including northern Vanua Levu, Cikobia, Qelelevu and Taveuni. The National Emergency Services Committee was mobilised that day to coordinate incoming data and oversee preparations for Raja. The FMS issued gale, storm and hurricane warnings for the island nation, while public and private broadcasting companies coordinated to disseminate information about Raja by radio over the next few days. Residents of the archipelago went to caves or evacuation centres, which were thought to be strong enough to withstand hurricane-force winds.

Severe damage was reported in areas of Fiji which received hurricane-force winds, including parts of Vanua Levu, the Koro and the Lau group of islands. Other parts of the island nation also incurred damage from a combination of gale- to hurricane-force winds, a storm surge of 2–3 metres (6.6–9.8 ft), heavy rain and wind waves. Severe damage was reported to crops, communication facilities, buildings, roads, seawalls, wharves, jetties and other coastal installations in low-lying areas. Damage to houses were reportedly less severe than in previous tropical cyclones, which was attributed by the Fijian minister for home affairs to better-constructed homes which had replaced those destroyed by previous storms. One person drowned on the island of Lakeba as he and two others tried to move a boat to a safer anchorage. Raja was responsible for the worst flooding of the Labasa River since December 1929, with the gauge at Labasa's civic centre peaking at 3.72 m (12.2 ft). The flooding in Labasa was later attributed to a blocked drainage system and exceptionally high tides.

A Royal New Zealand Air Force P-3 Orion plane flew to Fiji on 31 December, enabling Fijian authorities to conduct aerial surveys and damage assessments on 1 and 2 January. The flights indicated that damage to the island nation was less widespread than feared. A half-submerged ferry was found on a reef near the island of Nairai; it was later identified by Fijian authorities as the Romada, which had taken 60 passengers to the island for Christmas. The ferry sank with only the captain and the engineer aboard, and they reached shore in a life raft. On 2 January, the Fijian government announced its willingness to accept assistance and made specific requests for relief. United States Ambassador Carl Edward Dillery exercised his disaster-assistance authority, donating US$25,000 to the government of Fiji. Other donations included about FJ$100,000 from New Zealand, AU$100,000 from Australia, AU$65,000 from the United Nations Development Programme and ₠300,000 from the European Commission. On 5 January, World Vision Australia launched an appeal for AU$15,000 to send emergency food rations and other aid for 1,000 families to the island nation. The funds were used for short-term relief from Raja's effects, and included the purchase of food supplies, transport, sanitation equipment and agricultural tools and equipment. On 4 February, the Australian government announced that it would give AU$3.4 million to Fiji in addition to its previous emergency aid of AU$100 000.

== See also ==
- Typhoon Norris – Raja's twin Northern Hemisphere system
