= 1974–75 South Pacific cyclone season =

Tropical cyclone season

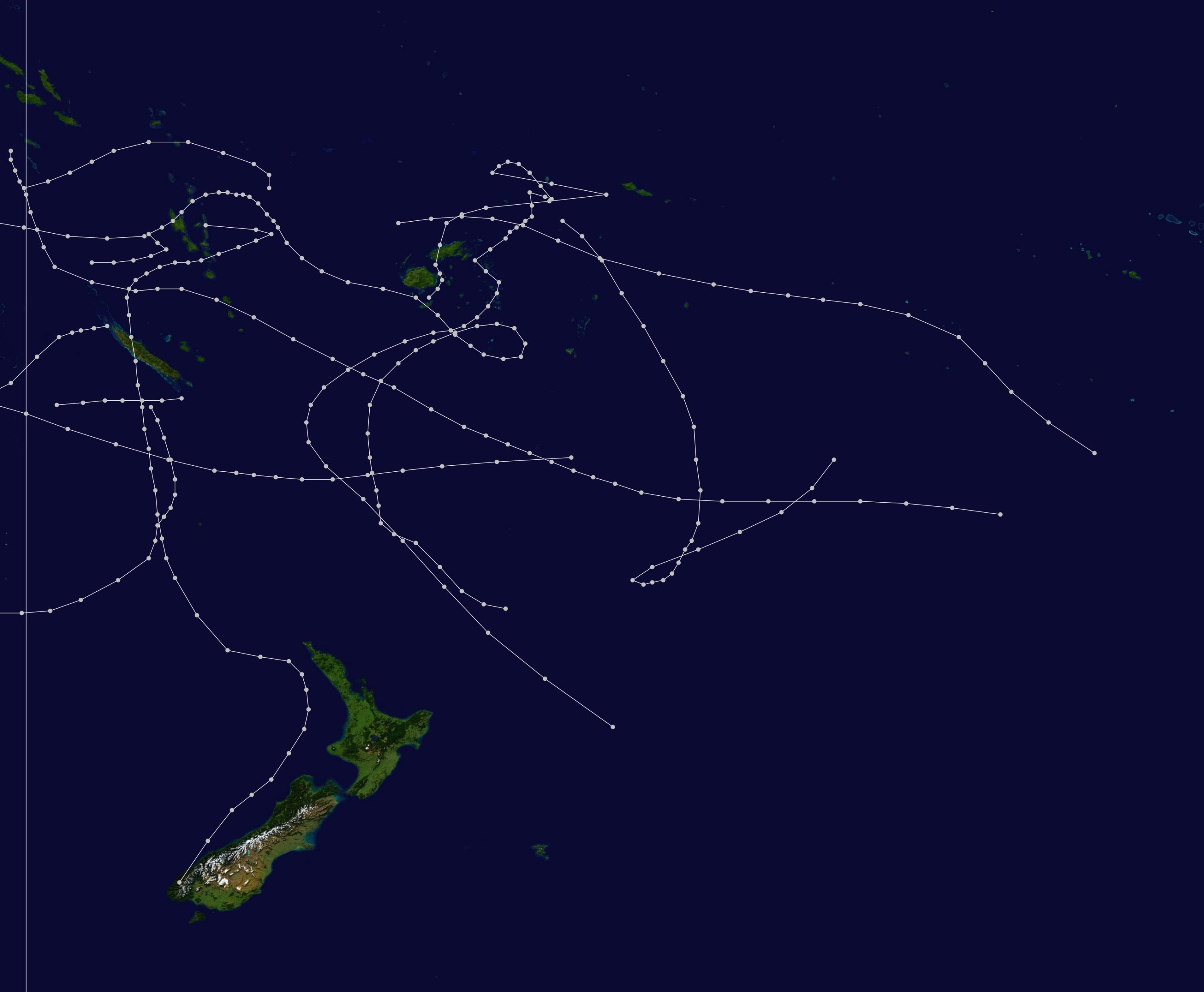
- Season summary map

Seasonal boundaries
- First system formed: November 20, 1974
- Last system dissipated: April 6, 1975

Strongest storm
- Name: Val and Alison
  - Maximum winds: 155 km/h (100 mph) (10-minute sustained)
  - Lowest pressure: 945 hPa (mbar)

Seasonal statistics
- Total disturbances: 6
- Tropical cyclones: 5
- Severe tropical cyclones: 3
- Total fatalities: Unknown
- Total damage: Unknown

Related articles
- 1974–75 Australian region cyclone season; 1974–75 South-West Indian Ocean cyclone season

The 1974–75 South Pacific cyclone season ran year-round from July 1 to June 30. Tropical cyclone activity in the Southern Hemisphere reaches its peak from mid-February to early March.

== Systems ==
=== Cyclone 04P ===
- Tropical storm (SSHWS)
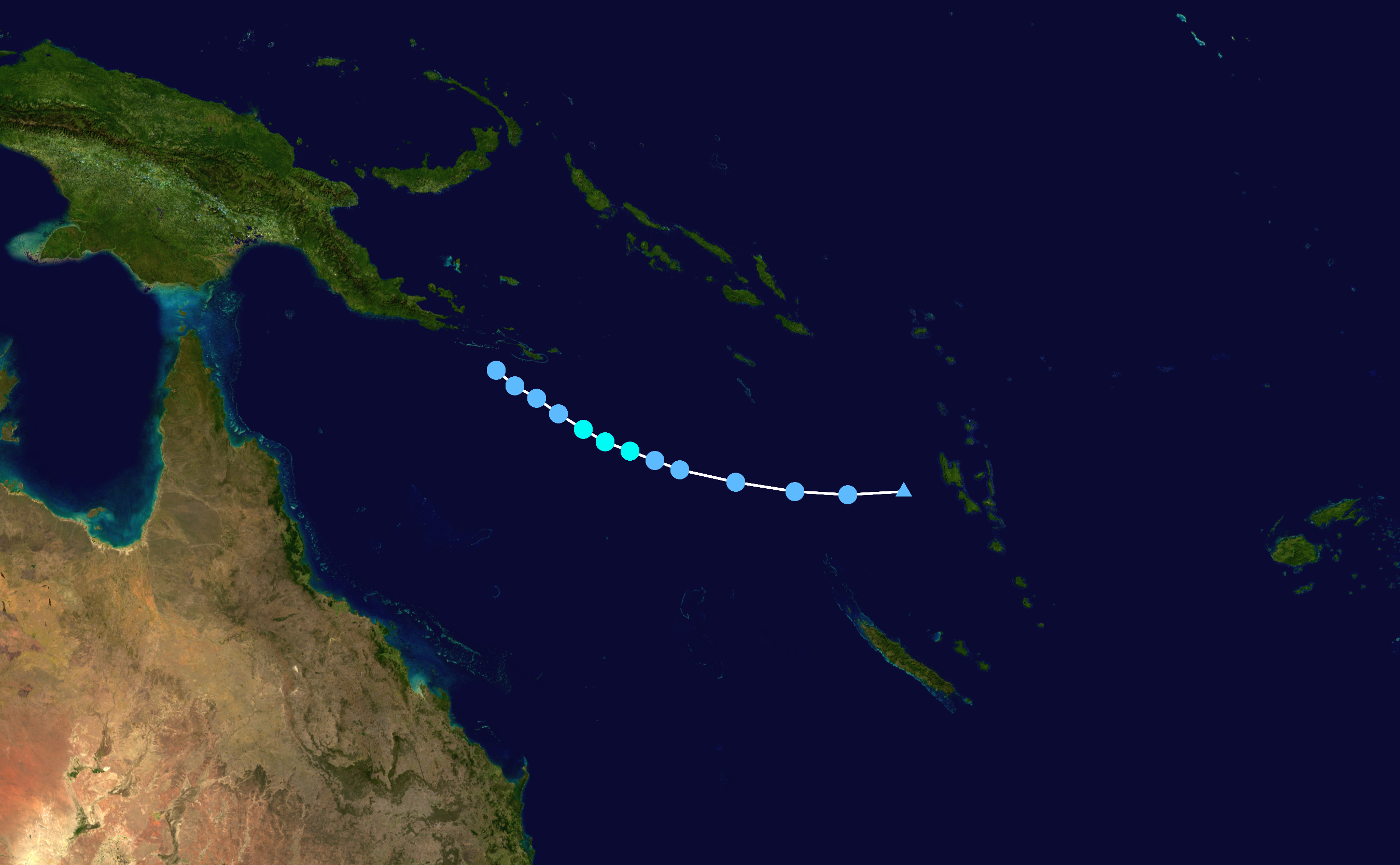
- Duration: December 6 – December 9
- Peak intensity: 65 km/h (40 mph) (1-min);

This cyclone existed from December 6 to December 9.

=== Cyclone 05P ===
- Tropical storm (SSHWS)
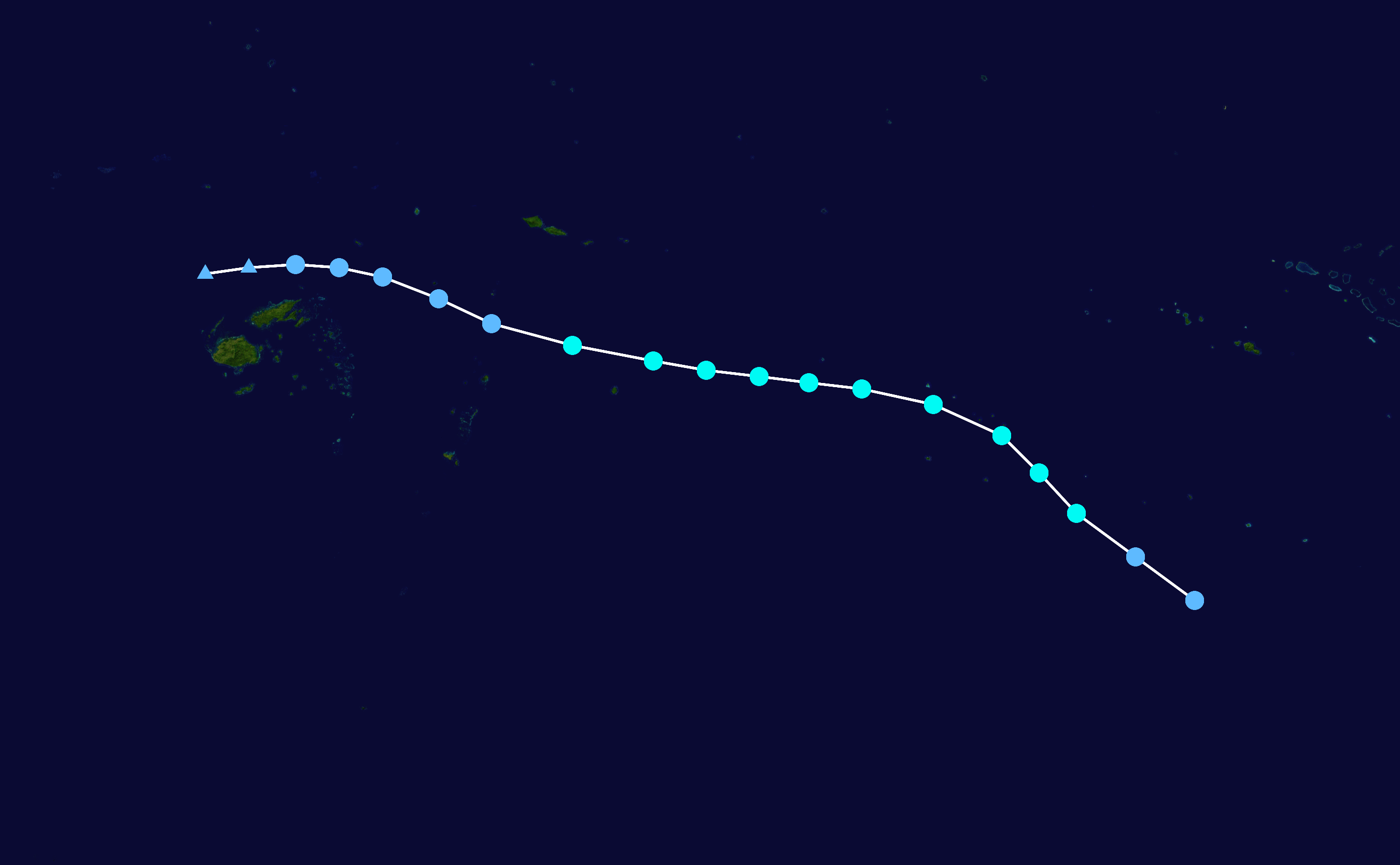
- Duration: December 11 – December 15
- Peak intensity: 85 km/h (50 mph) (1-min);

This cyclone existed from December 11 to December 15.

=== Cyclone 06P ===
- Tropical storm (SSHWS)
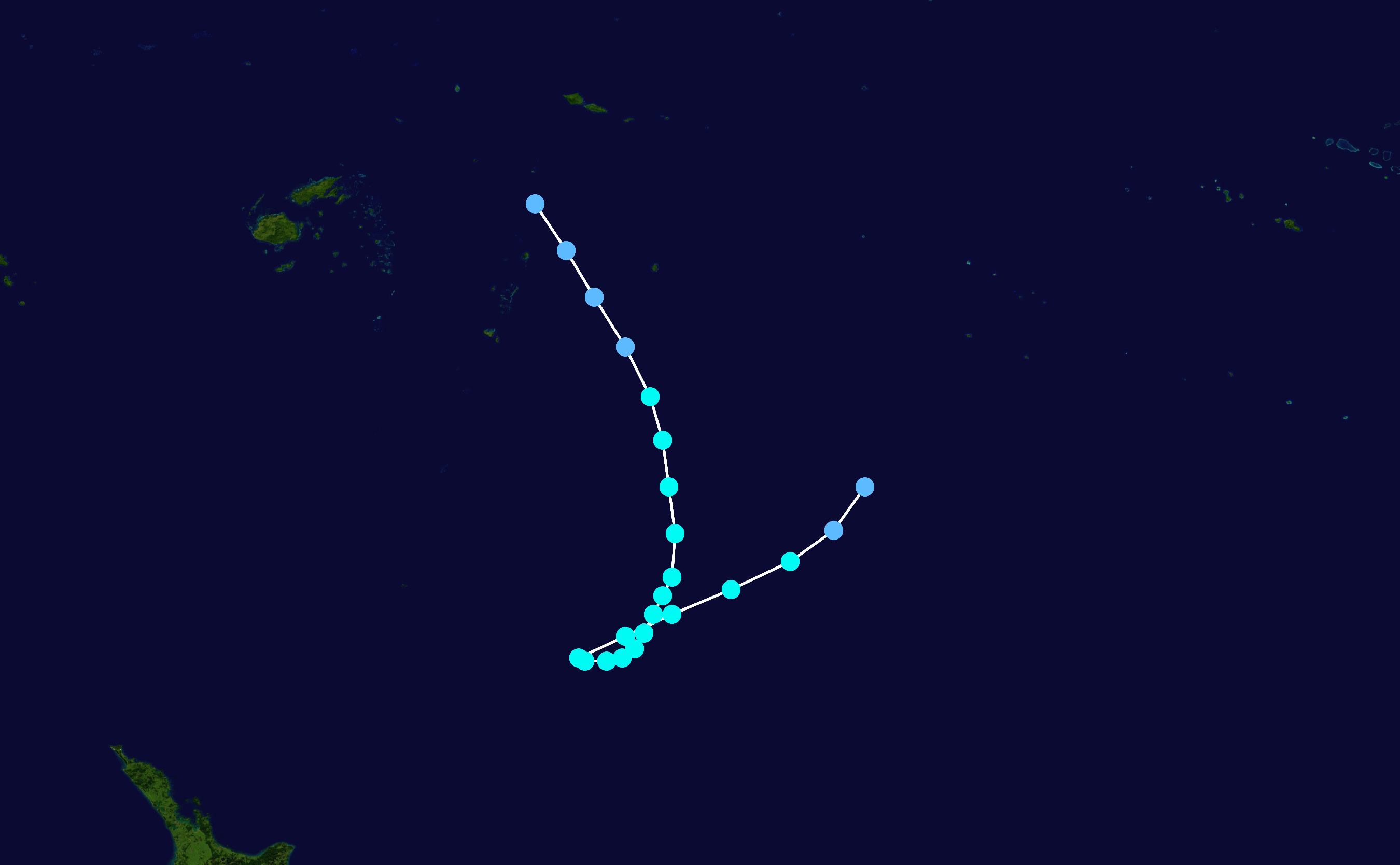
- Duration: December 18 – December 24
- Peak intensity: 95 km/h (60 mph) (1-min);

This cyclone existed from December 18 to December 24.

=== Tropical Cyclone Flora ===
- Category 2 tropical cyclone (Australian scale)
- Tropical storm (SSHWS)
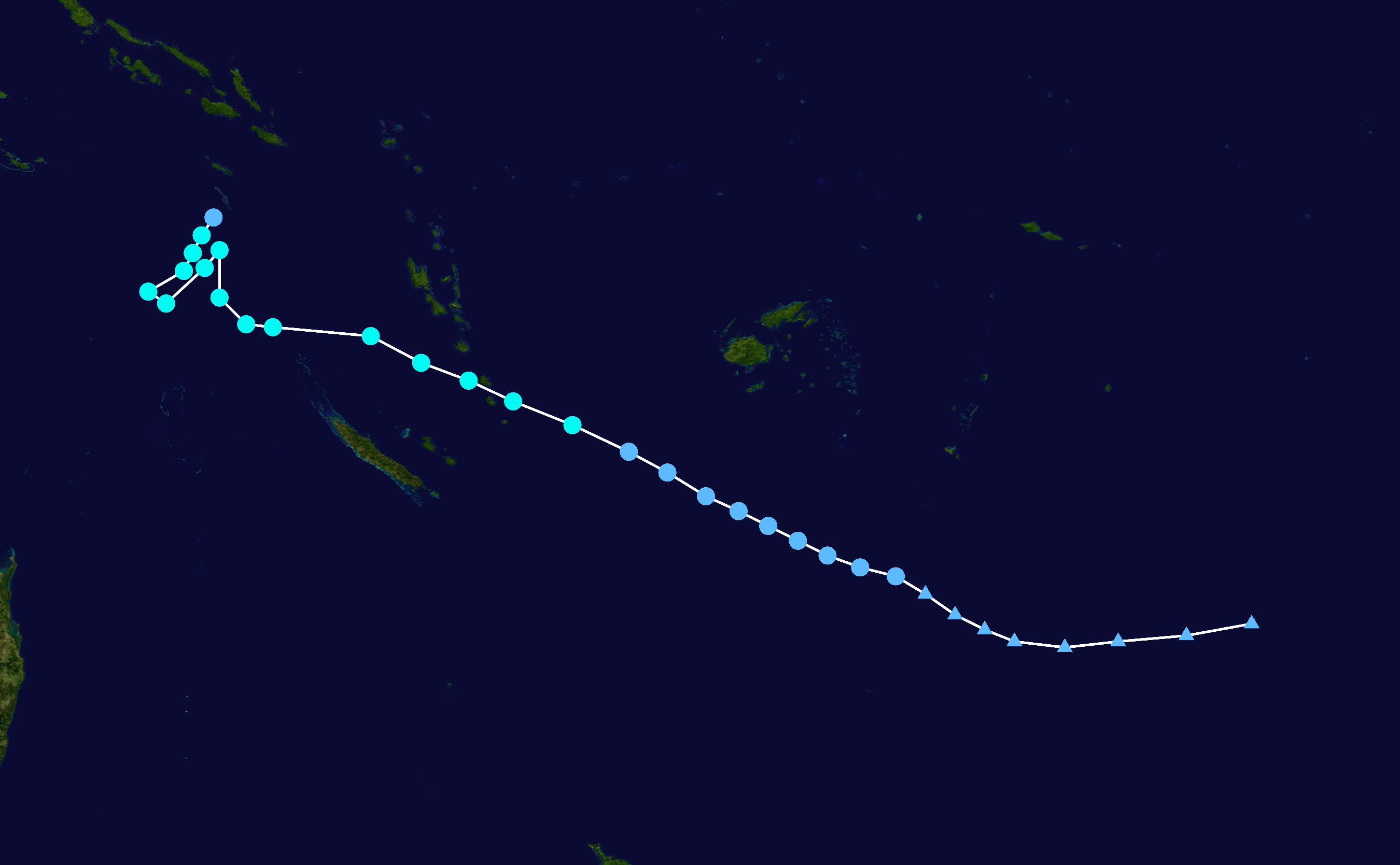
- Duration: January 12 – January 22
- Peak intensity: 100 km/h (65 mph) (10-min); 980 hPa (mbar)

Tropical Cyclone Flora existed from January 12 to January 22.

=== Tropical Cyclone Gloria ===
- Category 2 tropical cyclone (Australian scale)
- Tropical storm (SSHWS)
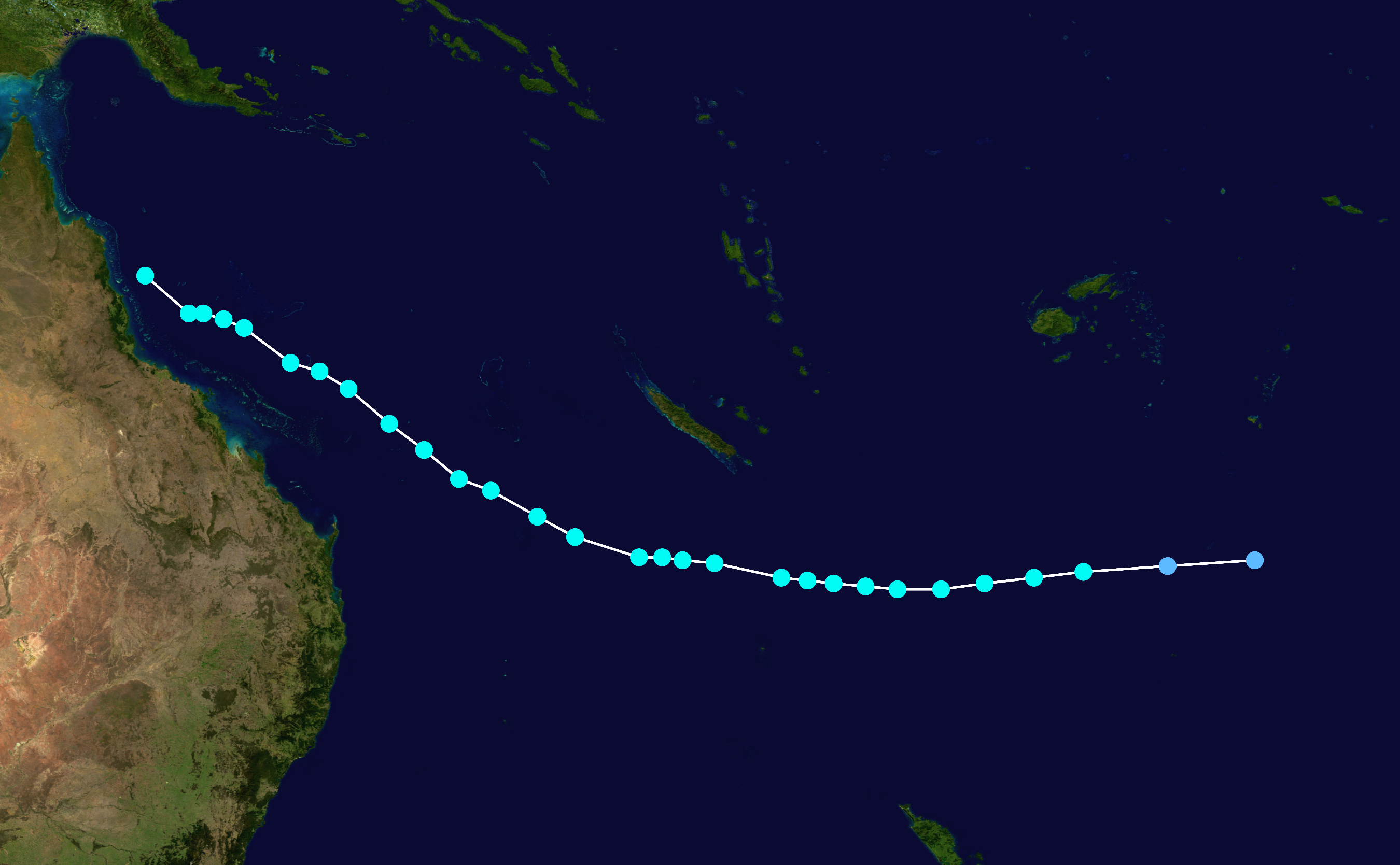
- Duration: January 19 – January 23
- Peak intensity: 100 km/h (65 mph) (10-min); 976 hPa (mbar)

Tropical Cyclone Gloria existed from January 14 to January 23.

=== Cyclone 15P ===
- Tropical storm (SSHWS)
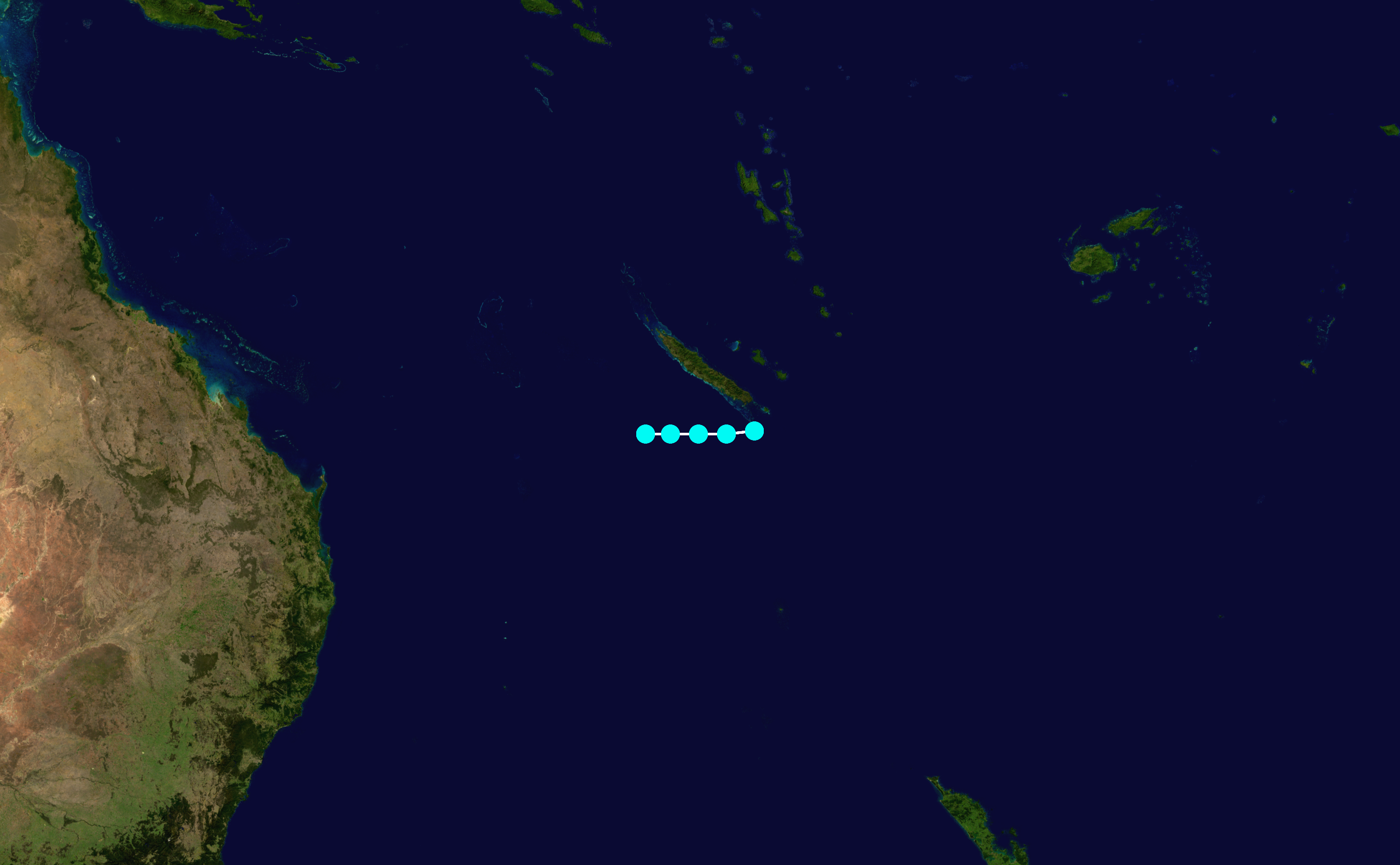
- Duration: January 19 – January 21
- Peak intensity: 65 km/h (40 mph) (1-min);

This cyclone existed from January 19 to January 21.

=== Severe Tropical Cyclone Val ===
- Category 3 severe tropical cyclone (Australian scale)
- Category 4 tropical cyclone (SSHWS)
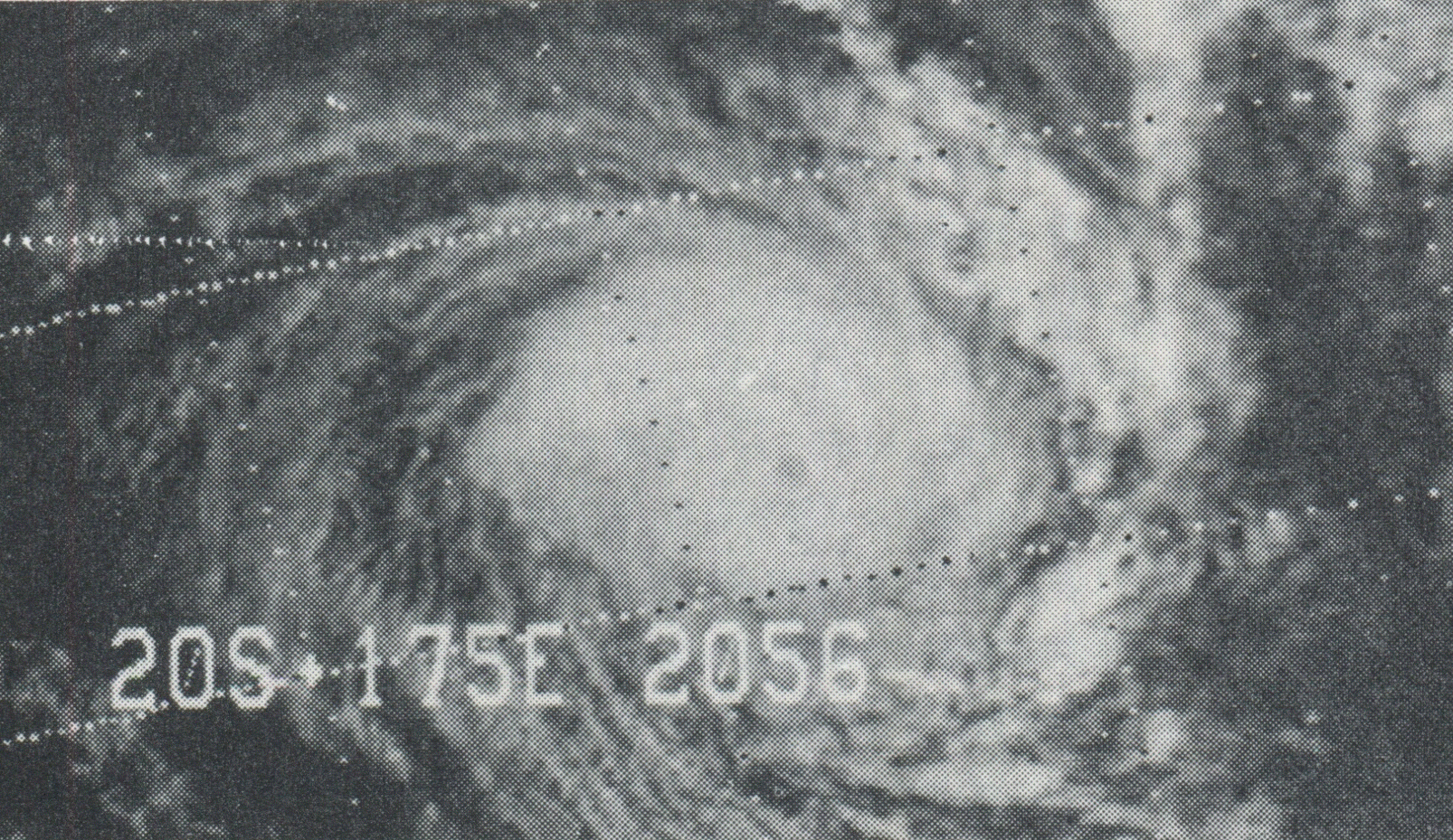
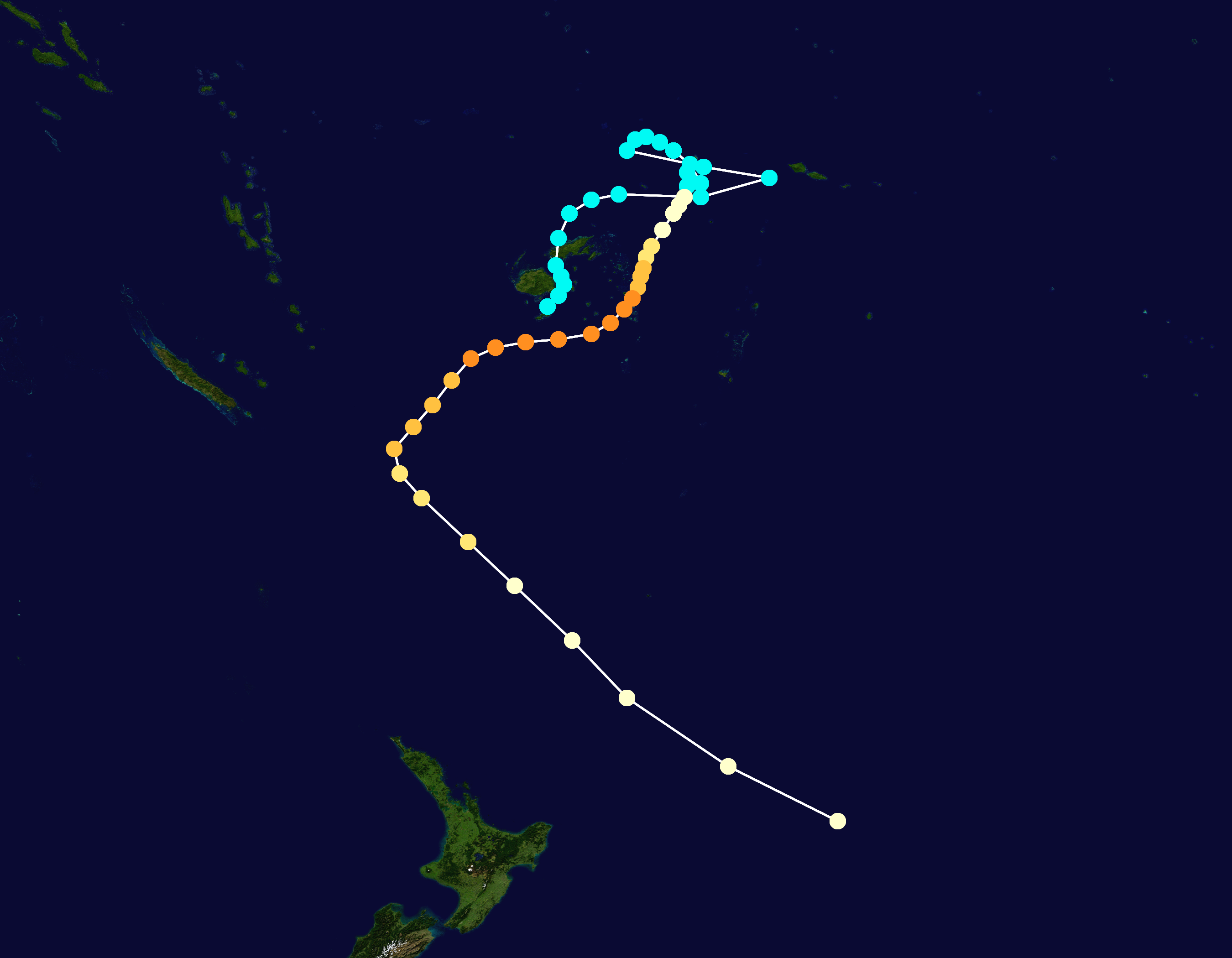
- Duration: January 24 – February 5
- Peak intensity: 155 km/h (100 mph) (10-min); 945 hPa (mbar)

This cyclone existed from January 24 to February 5.

=== Cyclone 18P ===
- Tropical storm (SSHWS)
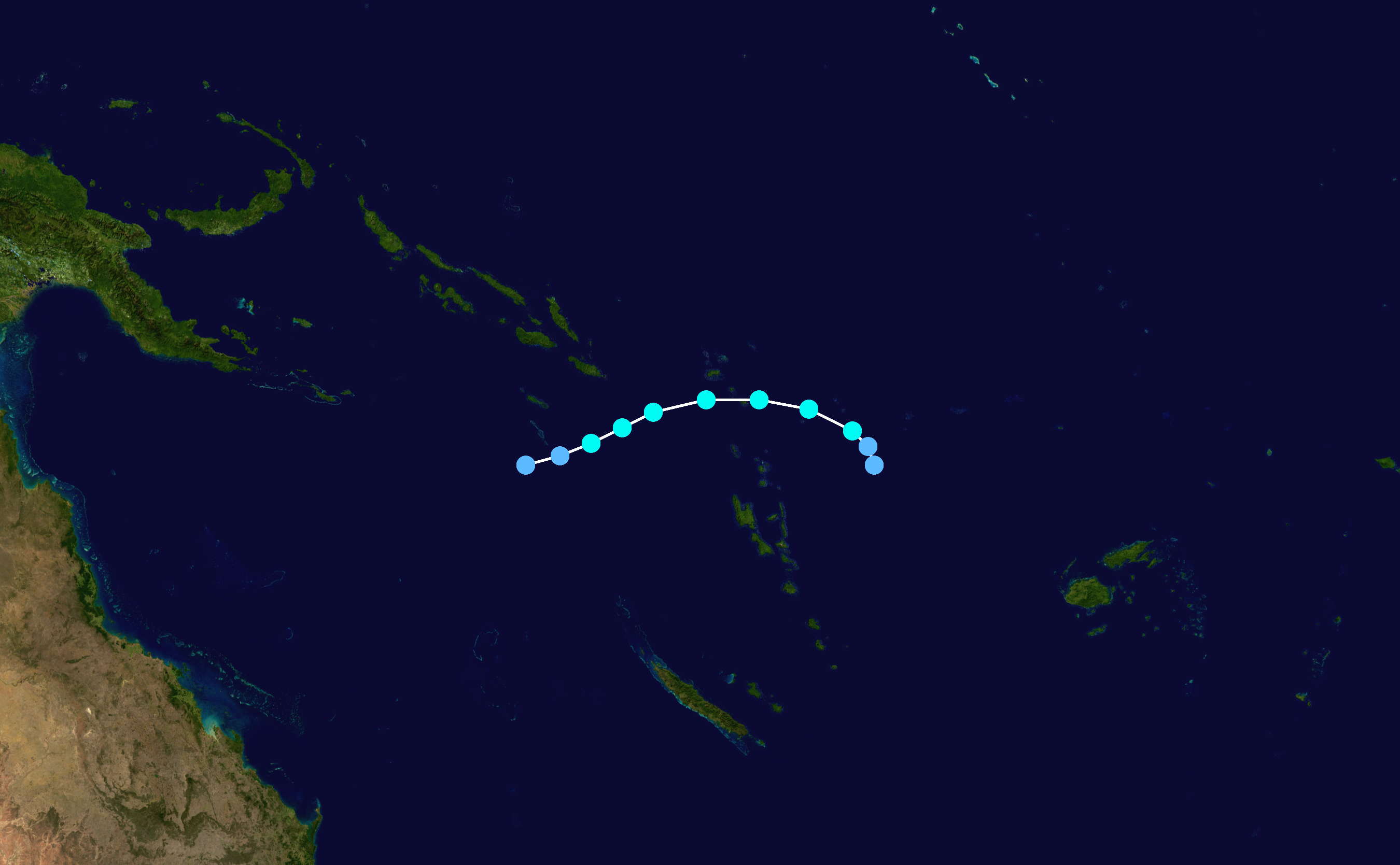
- Duration: January 26 – January 28
- Peak intensity: 65 km/h (40 mph) (1-min);

This cyclone existed from January 26 to January 28.

=== Severe Tropical Cyclone Alison ===
- Category 3 severe tropical cyclone (Australian scale)
- Category 4 tropical cyclone (SSHWS)
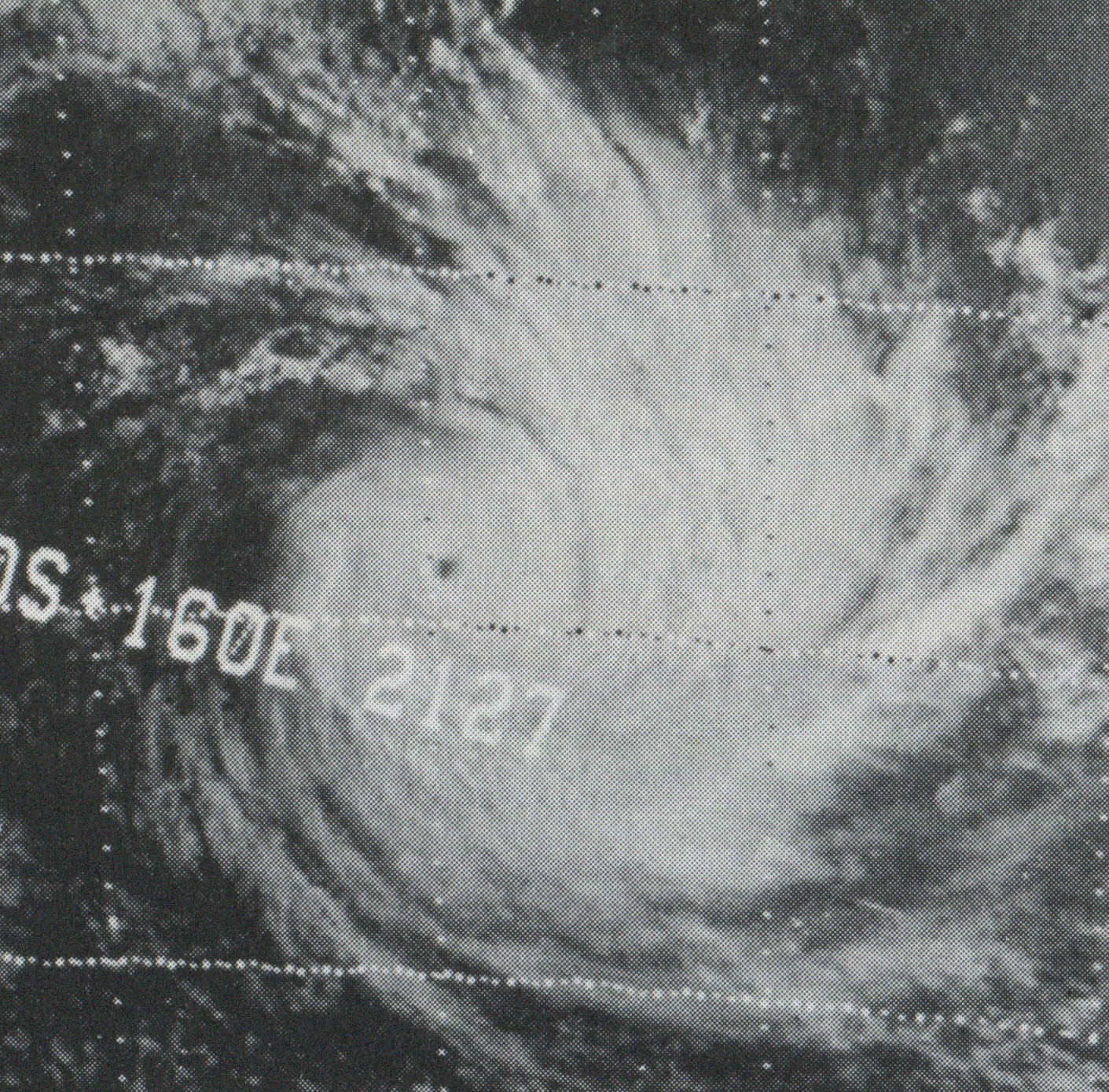
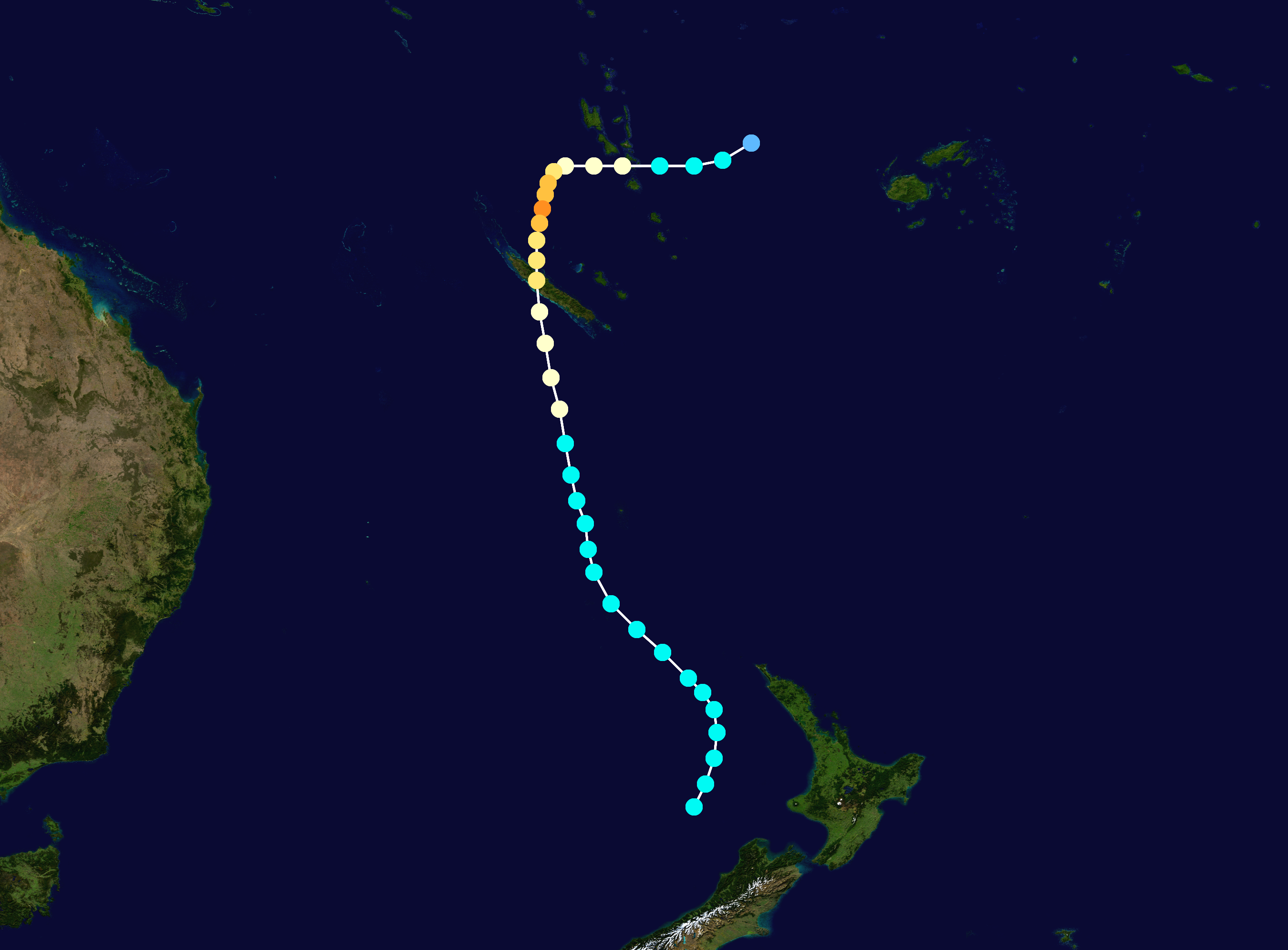
- Duration: March 4 – March 13
- Peak intensity: 155 km/h (100 mph) (10-min); 945 hPa (mbar)

This cyclone existed from March 4 to March 13.

=== Severe Tropical Cyclone Betty ===
- Category 3 severe tropical cyclone (Australian scale)
- Category 2 tropical cyclone (SSHWS)
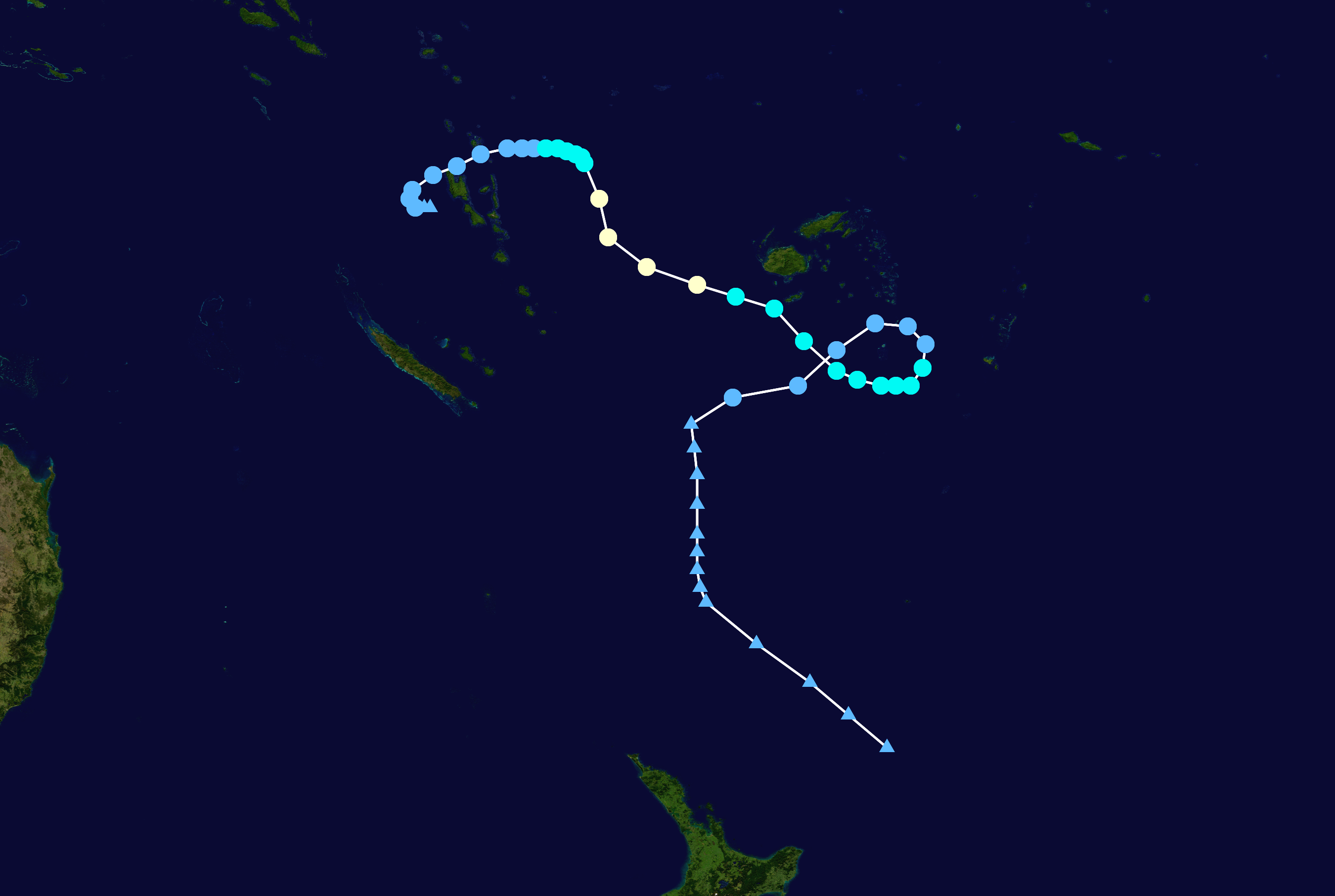
- Duration: March 30 – April 12
- Peak intensity: 130 km/h (80 mph) (10-min); 965 hPa (mbar)

This cyclone existed from March 30 to April 12.

=== Other systems ===
The first tropical disturbance of the season was first noted on November 19, while it was located within the Australian region about 500 km (310 mi) to the north of Brisbane, Australia. Over the next couple of days, the system moved north-westwards into the South Pacific basin towards New Caledonia, before it recurved south-eastwards and was last noted as it moved back into the Australian region during November 24. A windspeed of 75 km/h (45 mph) was recorded in northern New Zealand and associated with this system.

== Seasonal effects ==
1974–75 South Pacific cyclone season
Name	Dates active	Peak intensity			Areas affected	Damage (US$)	Deaths	Refs
Name	Dates active	Category	Wind speed	Pressure	Areas affected	Damage (US$)	Deaths	Refs
Unnamed	November 20 – 24	Category 1 tropical cyclone	85 km/h (50 mph)	994 hPa (29.35 inHg)	New Caledonia	Unknown	Unknown	
Flora	January 12 – 22	Category 2 tropical cyclone	100 km/h (65 mph)	980 hPa (28.94 inHg)		Unknown	Unknown	
Gloria	January 19 – 23	Category 2 tropical cyclone	100 km/h (65 mph)	980 hPa (28.94 inHg)		Unknown	Unknown	
Val	January 24 – February 5	Category 3 severe tropical cyclone	155 km/h (100 mph)	965 hPa (28.50 inHg)		Unknown	Unknown	
Alison	March 4 – 13	Category 3 severe tropical cyclone	130 km/h (80 mph)	965 hPa (28.50 inHg)		Unknown	Unknown	
Betty	March 30 – April 12	Category 3 severe tropical cyclone	155 km/h (100 mph)	965 hPa (28.50 inHg)		Unknown	Unknown	
Season aggregates
6 systems	November 20, 1974 – April 12, 1975		155 km/h (100 mph)	965 hPa (28.50 inHg)				

== See also ==
- Atlantic hurricane seasons: 1974, 1975
- Eastern Pacific hurricane seasons: 1974, 1975
- Western Pacific typhoon seasons: 1974, 1975
- North Indian Ocean cyclone seasons: 1974, 1975
- List of tropical cyclone records
