= List of retired South Pacific cyclone names =

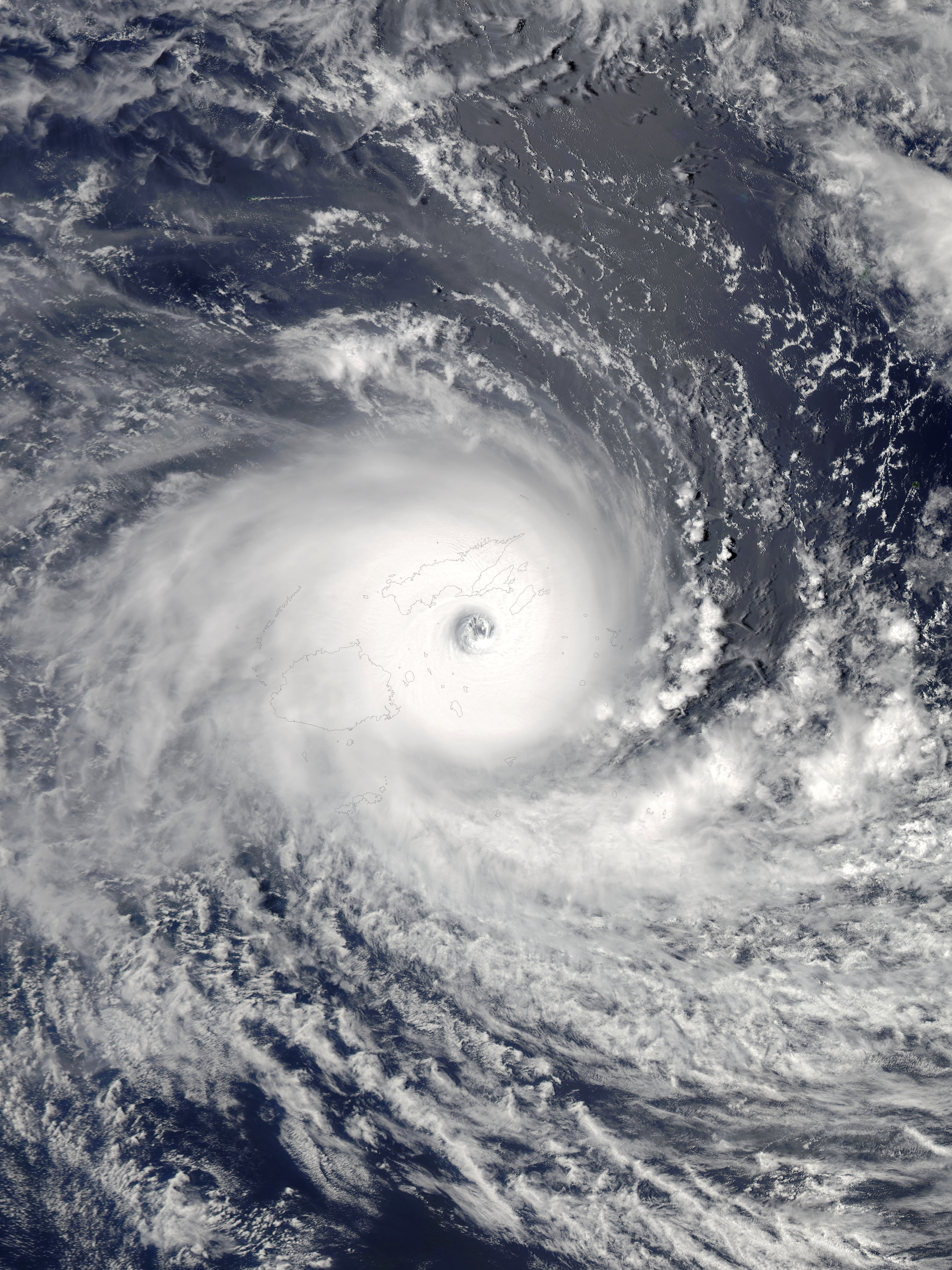
Satellite image of Cyclone Winston, the strongest recorded tropical cyclone in the Southern Hemisphere

Tropical cyclones are non-frontal, low-pressure systems that develop, within an environment of warm sea surface temperatures and little vertical wind shear aloft. Within the South Pacific, names are assigned from a pre-determined list, to such systems, once they reach or exceed ten-minute sustained wind speeds of 65 km/h (40 mph), near the center, by either the Fiji Meteorological Service or New Zealand's MetService. Within the South Pacific, tropical cyclones have been officially named since the 1964–65 South Pacific cyclone season, though a few meteorological papers show that a few tropical cyclones were named before 1964–65. The names of significant tropical cyclones that have caused a high amount of damage and/or caused a significant number of deaths are retired from the lists of tropical cyclone names by the World Meteorological Organization's RA V Tropical Cyclone Committee at their bi-annual meeting.

Within the South Pacific, there have been a total of 117 tropical cyclone names retired. The most intense tropical cyclone to have its name retired was Winston, which had an estimated peak pressure of 884 hPa (26.1 inHg). The deadliest tropical cyclone to have its name retired was Severe Tropical Cyclone Namu, which caused over 100 deaths, when it affected the Solomon Islands in May 1986. The most damaging system was Yasi which caused over US$2.5 billion in damage to Vanuatu, the Solomon Islands, and Australia in January and February 2011.

== Background ==
Within the region the credit for the first usage of personal names for weather systems, is generally given to the Queensland Government Meteorologist Clement Wragge, who named systems between 1887 and 1907. Wragge used names drawn from the letters of the Greek alphabet, Greek and Roman mythology and female names, to describe weather systems over Australia, New Zealand and the Antarctic. After the new Australian government had failed to create a federal weather bureau and appoint him director, Wragge started naming cyclones after political figures.

During the 1963–64 cyclone season the Australian Bureau of Meteorology started to use female names for tropical cyclones that occurred within the Australian region, before the New Zealand Meteorological Service's Fiji office also started using female names for tropical cyclones within the South Pacific during the 1969–70 cyclone season. During the International Women's Year of 1975 the NZMS decided to incorporate male names into the naming lists for the South Pacific, following a request from the Fiji National Council of Women who considered the practice discrimination. At around the same time the Australian Science Minister ordered that tropical cyclones, within the Australian region should carry both men's and women's names. This was because the minister thought "that both sexes should bear the odium of the devastation caused by cyclones." As a result, male names were added to the lists of names for both basins, ahead of the 1975–76 season.

=== History ===
During the latter stages of World War II, forecasters with the United States Armed Forces started naming tropical cyclones over the Pacific Ocean after their wives and sweethearts. In 1945, after the practice had become popular among forecasters who found that it reduced confusion during map discussions, the Armed Forces formalized the scheme and began publicly assigning female names to tropical cyclones in the Northern Hemisphere and male names to those in the Southern Hemisphere. Over the next few years, the practice gradually fell into disuse in the Southern Hemisphere, before it was revived by the Meteorological Service of New Caledonia during the 1958-59 season. In November 1962, New Caledonia proposed to the Third Session of the World Meteorological Organization's Regional Association V that all tropical cyclones that occurred within the region should be identified with female names. In response, other members of the Association suggested using male names to avoid any confusion with the names used in the Northern Hemisphere, but noted that any naming scheme would require close coordination in order to avoid causing confusion. Ultimately, the Association decided that there was no need for a regional naming scheme to be introduced to the south of the Equator; however, it had no objections to members using such schemes on a national basis provided that the same names were not allocated in neighboring regions to different cyclones.

In October 1963, the Australian Bureau of Meteorology announced that its three tropical cyclone warning centres in Perth, Darwin and Brisbane, would start using female names to name tropical cyclones during the upcoming season. At the time, the New Zealand Meteorological Service

In 1979, the NZMS considered adding traditional Pacific names to the naming lists, rather than relying solely on European names, which prompted considerable discussion due to the anticipated difficulties of navigating the region's many languages and cultures. One proposal was that cyclones should be given names from the country nearest to where they formed; however, this proposal was abandoned when it was realised that a cyclone might be less destructive in its formative stage than later in its development. Eventually, it was decided to pool names from across the South Pacific during a training course, where each course member provided a list of names that were short, easily pronounced, culturally acceptable throughout the region and free of idiosyncrasies. These names were then collated, edited for suitability and cross-checked with the group for acceptability to create four alphabetical lists of names, which have been used by the Fiji Meteorological Service since the 1980–81 season.

At the 22nd session of the RA V Tropical Cyclone Committee in 2024, the names Lola and Mal were retired and replaced with Lia and Manoah, while it was noted that the name Eseta had been previously retired after its use in 2003. The name Rae was retired the following year, after it caused strong winds, heavy rain and flooding in Fiji.

== Systems ==
Name	Dates	Peak intensity			Areas affected	Damage (USD)	Deaths	Ref(s).
Name	Dates	Category	Wind speed	Pressure	Areas affected	Damage (USD)	Deaths	Ref(s).
Rosie	December 30, 1970 – January 4, 1971	Category 2 tropical cyclone	100 km/h (65 mph)	980 hPa (28.94 inHg)	Vanuatu, New Caledonia, New Zealand	Minor	None	
Vivienne	December 17 – 19, 1971	Category 1 tropical cyclone	75 km/h (45 mph)	990 hPa (29.23 inHg)	French Polynesia	None	None	
Carlotta	January 8 – 26, 1972	Category 3 severe tropical cyclone	155 km/h (100 mph)	940 hPa (27.76 inHg)	Solomon Islands, New Caledonia; Vanuatu	Unknown	4	
Wendy	January 23 – February 9, 1972	Category 3 severe tropical cyclone	155 km/h (100 mph)	945 hPa (27.91 inHg)	New Caledonia, Vanuatu	Unknown	4	
Agatha	March 27 – 29, 1972	Category 3 severe tropical cyclone	120 km/h (75 mph)	980 hPa (28.94 inHg)	Cook Islands	Unknown	None	
Bebe	October 19 – 28, 1972	Category 3 severe tropical cyclone	155 km/h (100 mph)	945 hPa (27.91 inHg)	Fiji, Tuvalu	$20 million	24	
Lottie	December 5 – 12, 1973	Category 3 severe tropical cyclone	130 km/h (80 mph)	965 hPa (28.50 inHg)	Fiji, Tonga	Moderate	80	
Tina	April 24 – 28, 1974	Category 2 tropical cyclone	100 km/h (65 mph)	980 hPa (28.94 inHg)	Fiji, Tonga	Minor	None	
Alison	March 4 – 12, 1975	Category 3 severe tropical cyclone	155 km/h (100 mph)	945 hPa (27.91 inHg)	New Caledonia, New Zealand; Vanuatu	$1 million	None	
David	January 13 – 19, 1976	Category 3 severe tropical cyclone	155 km/h (100 mph)	961 hPa (28.38 inHg)	Queensland	N/A	None	
Elsa	January 21 – 26, 1976	Category 2 tropical cyclone	100 km/h (65 mph)	980 hPa (28.94 inHg)	New Caledonia, Vanuatu	None	None	
Marion	January 12 – 21, 1977	Category 2 tropical cyclone	100 km/h (65 mph)	965 hPa (28.50 inHg)	Vanuatu	Unknown	None	
Robert	April 16 – 22, 1977	Category 3 severe tropical cyclone	130 km/h (80 mph)	980 hPa (28.94 inHg)	French Polynesia	Unknown	None	
Bob	January 31 – February 12, 1978	Category 3 severe tropical cyclone	155 km/h (100 mph)	945 hPa (27.91 inHg)	Fiji, New Caledonia; Vanuatu, New Zealand	Moderate	1	
Charles	February 14 – 28, 1978	Category 3 severe tropical cyclone	155 km/h (100 mph)	945 hPa (27.91 inHg)	Samoan Islands	Unknown	None	
Diana	February 15 – 22, 1978	Category 2 tropical cyclone	100 km/h (65 mph)	980 hPa (28.94 inHg)	French Polynesia	Unknown	None	
Fay	December 27 – 31, 1978	Category 2 tropical cyclone	100 km/h (65 mph)	980 hPa (28.94 inHg)	Fiji	Moderate	None	
Gordon	January 4 – 12, 1979	Category 3 severe tropical cyclone	130 km/h (80 mph)	965 hPa (28.50 inHg)	Australia, New Caledonia; Vanuatu	Severe	None	
Kerry	February 13 – March 6, 1979	Category 3 severe tropical cyclone	155 km/h (100 mph)	945 hPa (27.91 inHg)	Australia, Solomon Islands	Unknown	4	
Meli	March 24 – 31, 1979	Category 3 severe tropical cyclone	155 km/h (100 mph)	945 hPa (27.91 inHg)	Fiji	Severe	53	
Wally	April 2 – 7, 1980	Category 1 tropical cyclone	75 km/h (45 mph)	990 hPa (29.23 inHg)	Fiji	$2.26 million	18	
Tahmar	March 8 – 13, 1981	Category 3 severe tropical cyclone	120 km/h (75 mph)	970 hPa (28.64 inHg)	French Polynesia	Unknown	None	
Gyan	December 18 – 29, 1981	Category 4 severe tropical cyclone	185 km/h (115 mph)	925 hPa (27.32 inHg)	Vanuatu	Unknown	None	
Isaac	February 27 – March 5, 1982	Category 4 severe tropical cyclone	175 km/h (110 mph)	930 hPa (27.46 inHg)	Tonga	$10 million	6	
Joti	October 31 – November 7, 1982	Category 2 tropical cyclone	110 km/h (70 mph)	975 hPa (28.79 inHg)	Vanuatu	Minor	None	
Lisa	December 10 – 18, 1982	Category 2 tropical cyclone	110 km/h (70 mph)	975 hPa (28.79 inHg)	Cook Islands	Unknown	None	
Mark	January 21 – February 1, 1983	Category 3 severe tropical cyclone	150 km/h (90 mph)	955 hPa (28.20 inHg)	Fiji	Unknown	None	
Oscar	February 26 – March 6, 1983	Category 4 severe tropical cyclone	185 km/h (115 mph)	920 hPa (27.17 inHg)	Fiji	$130 million	9	
Veena	April 8 – 14, 1983	Category 4 severe tropical cyclone	185 km/h (115 mph)	955 hPa (28.20 inHg)	French Polynesia	Unknown	None	
Eric	January 12 – 20, 1985	Category 3 severe tropical cyclone	150 km/h (90 mph)	955 hPa (28.20 inHg)	Fiji, Vanuatu	$40 million	9	
Ima	February 5 – 16, 1986	Category 4 severe tropical cyclone	165 km/h (105 mph)	965 hPa (28.50 inHg)	Cook Islands	Unknown	None	
Namu	May 16 – 22, 1986	Category 3 severe tropical cyclone	150 km/h (90 mph)	955 hPa (28.20 inHg)	Solomon Islands	$10 million	111	
Raja	December 21, 1986 – January 5, 1987	Category 3 severe tropical cyclone	150 km/h (90 mph)	955 hPa (28.20 inHg)	Fiji, Tonga, Tuvalu; Wallis and Futuna	$14 million	2	
Sally	December 26, 1986 – January 5, 1987	Category 3 severe tropical cyclone	150 km/h (90 mph)	955 hPa (28.20 inHg)	Cook Islands, French Polynesia	$24.6 million	None	
Tusi	January 13 – 21, 1987	Category 3 severe tropical cyclone	150 km/h (90 mph)	955 hPa (28.20 inHg)	American Samoa	$24 million	None	
Uma	February 4 – 8, 1987	Category 4 severe tropical cyclone	165 km/h (105 mph)	940 hPa (27.76 inHg)	Vanuatu	$150 million	50	
Anne	January 5 – 14, 1988	Category 4 severe tropical cyclone	185 km/h (115 mph)	925 hPa (27.32 inHg)	New Caledonia, Vanuatu	$500,000	2	
Bola	February 24 – March 4, 1988	Category 4 severe tropical cyclone	175 km/h (110 mph)	940 hPa (27.76 inHg)	Fiji, New Zealand, Vanuatu	$87 million	3	
Harry	February 8 – 19, 1989	Category 4 severe tropical cyclone	185 km/h (115 mph)	925 hPa (27.32 inHg)	New Caledonia	Unknown	None	
Lili	April 7 – 11, 1989	Category 3 severe tropical cyclone	150 km/h (90 mph)	955 hPa (28.20 inHg)	New Caledonia, Solomon Islands; Vanuatu	Unknown	None	
Ofa	January 27 – February 10, 1990	Category 4 severe tropical cyclone	185 km/h (115 mph)	925 hPa (27.32 inHg)	American Samoa, Niue, Samoa; Tokelau, Tonga, Tuvalu	$187 million	8	
Peni	February 12 – 18, 1990	Category 3 severe tropical cyclone	120 km/h (75 mph)	970 hPa (28.64 inHg)	Cook Islands	$1 million	1	
Sina	November 20 – December 4, 1990	Category 3 severe tropical cyclone	140 km/h (85 mph)	960 hPa (28.35 inHg)	Fiji, Niue, Cook Islands, Tonga	$18.5 million	None	
Tia	November 13 – 21, 1991	Category 3 severe tropical cyclone	140 km/h (85 mph)	960 hPa (28.35 inHg)	Solomon Islands, Vanuatu	Minimal	None	
Val	December 4 – 17, 1991	Category 4 severe tropical cyclone	165 km/h (105 mph)	940 hPa (27.76 inHg)	American Samoa, Cook Islands; Samoa, Tonga, Tokelau; Tuvalu, Wallis and Futuna	$330 million	16	
Wasa	December 4 – 18, 1991	Category 4 severe tropical cyclone	165 km/h (105 mph)	940 hPa (27.76 inHg)	French Polynesia	$60 million	2	
Betsy	January 4 – 15, 1992	Category 4 severe tropical cyclone	165 km/h (105 mph)	940 hPa (27.76 inHg)	Vanuatu	$2 million	2	
Esau	February 24 – March 7, 1992	Category 4 severe tropical cyclone	195 km/h (120 mph)	925 hPa (27.32 inHg)	Vanuatu	Minimal	1	
Fran	March 4 – 17, 1992	Category 5 severe tropical cyclone	205 km/h (125 mph)	920 hPa (27.17 inHg)	Fiji, New Caledonia, Queensland; Vanuatu, Wallis and Futuna	$1 million	None	
Joni	December 3 – 13, 1992	Category 4 severe tropical cyclone	165 km/h (105 mph)	940 hPa (27.76 inHg)	Fiji, Tuvalu	$1.6 million	1	
Kina	December 26, 1992 – January 6, 1993	Category 3 severe tropical cyclone	150 km/h (90 mph)	955 hPa (28.20 inHg)	Fiji, Tonga	$110 million	26	
Prema	March 26 – April 6, 1993	Category 4 severe tropical cyclone	165 km/h (105 mph)	940 hPa (27.76 inHg)	New Caledonia, Vanuatu	$50 million	1	
Rewa	December 26, 1993 – January 23, 1994	Category 5 severe tropical cyclone	205 km/h (125 mph)	920 hPa (27.17 inHg)	New Caledonia, New Zealand; Papua New Guinea, Queensland; Solomon Islands, Vanuatu	Unknown	22	
William	December 30, 1994 – January 5, 1995	Category 2 tropical cyclone	110 km/h (70 mph)	975 hPa (28.79 inHg)	Cook Islands, French Polynesia	$2.5 million	None	
Beti	March 21 – 28, 1996	Category 4 severe tropical cyclone	165 km/h (105 mph)	935 hPa (27.61 inHg)	Australia, New Caledonia; New Zealand, Vanuatu	$5.3 million	2	
Drena	January 3 – 10, 1997	Category 4 severe tropical cyclone	165 km/h (105 mph)	935 hPa (27.61 inHg)	New Caledonia, New Zealand; Vanuatu	Unknown	None	
Gavin	March 3 – 12, 1997	Category 4 severe tropical cyclone	185 km/h (115 mph)	925 hPa (27.32 inHg)	Fiji, Tuvalu, Wallis and Futuna	$18.3 million	18	
Hina	March 13 – 18, 1997	Category 3 severe tropical cyclone	120 km/h (75 mph)	975 hPa (28.79 inHg)	Fiji, Tonga, Tuvalu; Wallis and Futuna	$15.2 million	None	
Keli	June 7 – 17, 1997	Category 3 severe tropical cyclone	150 km/h (90 mph)	955 hPa (28.20 inHg)	Tuvulu, Tonga, Wallis and Futuna	$10,000	None	
Martin	October 27 – November 5, 1997	Category 3 severe tropical cyclone	155 km/h (100 mph)	945 hPa (27.91 inHg)	Cook Islands, French Polynesia	$17.6 million	28	
Osea	November 24 – 28, 1997	Category 3 severe tropical cyclone	150 km/h (90 mph)	955 hPa (28.20 inHg)	Cook Islands, French Polynesia	Unknown	None	
Ron	January 1 – 9, 1998	Category 5 severe tropical cyclone	230 km/h (145 mph)	900 hPa (26.58 inHg)	Samoan Islands, Wallis and Futuna, Tonga, New Zealand	$737,000	None	
Susan	December 20, 1997 – January 9, 1998	Category 5 severe tropical cyclone	230 km/h (145 mph)	900 hPa (26.58 inHg)	Fiji, Solomon Islands, Vanuatu, New Zealand	$100,000	1	
Tui	January 25 – 27, 1998	Category 1 tropical cyclone	75–85 km/h (45–50 mph)	990 hPa (29.23 inHg)	Samoa, American Samoa	$850,000	1	
Ursula	January 30 – February 1, 1998	Category 2 tropical cyclone	110 km/h (70 mph)	975 hPa (28.79 inHg)	French Polynesia	Minor	None	
Veli	February 1 – 3, 1998	Category 2 tropical cyclone	100 km/h (65 mph)	985 hPa (29.09 inHg)	French Polynesia	Minor	None	
Cora	December 23 – 28, 1998	Category 3 severe tropical cyclone	140 km/h (85 mph)	960 hPa (28.35 inHg)	Tonga	$12 million	None	
Dani	January 15 – 22, 1999	Category 4 severe tropical cyclone	185 km/h (115 mph)	925 hPa (27.32 inHg)	Fiji, New Caledonia, Vanuatu	$2 million	14	
Frank	February 18 – 21, 1999	Category 3 severe tropical cyclone	150 km/h (90 mph)	955 hPa (28.20 inHg)	New Caledonia	Unknown	None	
Kim	February 23 – 29, 2000	Category 4 severe tropical cyclone	165 km/h (105 mph)	935 hPa (27.61 inHg)	French Polynesia	Minimal	None	
Paula	February 26 – March 4, 2001	Category 4 severe tropical cyclone	175 km/h (110 mph)	930 hPa (27.46 inHg)	Fiji, Tonga, Vanuatu	$1.39 million	2	
Sose	April 5 – 11, 2001	Category 2 tropical cyclone	110 km/h (70 mph)	975 hPa (28.79 inHg)	Australia, New Caledonia, Vanuatu	Unknown	4	
Trina	November 29 – December 3, 2001	Category 1 tropical cyclone	65 km/h (40 mph)	995 hPa (29.38 inHg)	Cook Islands	$52,000	None	
Waka	December 19, 2001 – January 2, 2002	Category 4 severe tropical cyclone	175 km/h (110 mph)	930 hPa (27.46 inHg)	Tonga, Wallis and Futuna	$51.3 million	1	
Zoe	December 23, 2002 – January 1, 2003	Category 5 severe tropical cyclone	240 km/h (150 mph)	890 hPa (26.28 inHg)	Solomon Islands, Vanuatu	Severe	None	
Ami	January 9 – 15, 2003	Category 3 severe tropical cyclone	150 km/h (90 mph)	950 hPa (28.05 inHg)	Fiji, Tonga, Tuvalu	$65 million	14	
Beni	January 25 – February 5, 2003	Category 5 severe tropical cyclone	205 km/h (125 mph)	920 hPa (27.17 inHg)	Australia, New Caledonia; Solomon Islands, Vanuatu	$1 million	1	
Cilla	January 27 – 29, 2003	Category 1 tropical cyclone	75 km/h (45 mph)	995 hPa (29.38 inHg)	Tonga	Unknown	None	
Eseta	March 10 – 14, 2003	Category 4 severe tropical cyclone	185 km/h (115 mph)	930 hPa (27.46 inHg)	Fiji, ʻEua	Unknown	None	
Heta	December 25, 2003 – January 8, 2004	Category 5 severe tropical cyclone	215 km/h (130 mph)	915 hPa (27.02 inHg)	American Samoa, Niue, Samoa; Tonga, Wallis and Futuna	$225 million	3	
Ivy	February 21 – March 2, 2004	Category 4 severe tropical cyclone	165 km/h (105 mph)	935 hPa (27.61 inHg)	Vanuatu	$8 million	2	
Meena	February 1 – 8, 2005	Category 5 severe tropical cyclone	205 km/h (125 mph)	915 hPa (27.02 inHg)	Cook Islands	Severe	None	
Nancy	February 10 – 17, 2005	Category 4 severe tropical cyclone	175 km/h (110 mph)	930 hPa (27.46 inHg)	Cook Islands	Severe	None	
Olaf	February 10 – 20, 2005	Category 5 severe tropical cyclone	230 km/h (145 mph)	915 hPa (27.02 inHg)	American Samoa, Cook Islands; Samoa	$10.2 million	9	
Percy	February 24 – March 5, 2005	Category 5 severe tropical cyclone	230 km/h (145 mph)	900 hPa (26.58 inHg)	American Samoa, Cook Islands; Samoa, Tokelau	$52,000	None	
Cliff	April 1 – 6, 2007	Category 2 tropical cyclone	100 km/h (65 mph)	980 hPa (28.94 inHg)	Fiji, Tonga	$4 million	1	
Daman	December 2 – 10, 2007	Category 4 severe tropical cyclone	185 km/h (115 mph)	925 hPa (27.32 inHg)	Fiji, Tonga	$330,000	None	
Funa	January 14 – 21, 2008	Category 4 severe tropical cyclone	175 km/h (110 mph)	930 hPa (27.46 inHg)	Vanuatu	Severe	None	
Gene	January 25 – February 9, 2008	Category 3 severe tropical cyclone	155 km/h (100 mph)	945 hPa (27.91 inHg)	Fiji	$35 million	8	
Mick	December 3 – 15, 2009	Category 2 tropical cyclone	110 km/h (70 mph)	975 hPa (28.79 inHg)	Fiji	$33 million	3	
Oli	January 29 – February 7, 2010	Category 4 severe tropical cyclone	185 km/h (115 mph)	925 hPa (27.32 inHg)	Cook Islands, French Polynesia	$70 million	1	
Pat	February 6 – 11, 2010	Category 3 severe tropical cyclone	140 km/h (85 mph)	960 hPa (28.35 inHg)	Cook Islands	$13.7 million	None	
Tomas	March 9 – 17, 2010	Category 4 severe tropical cyclone	185 km/h (115 mph)	925 hPa (27.32 inHg)	Wallis and Futuna, Fiji	$45 million	3	
Ului	March 9 – 21, 2010	Category 5 severe tropical cyclone	215 km/h (130 mph)	915 hPa (27.02 inHg)	Australia, Solomon Islands; Vanuatu	$72 million	1	
Vania	January 5 – 15, 2011	Category 2 tropical cyclone	100 km/h (65 mph)	973 hPa (28.73 inHg)	New Caledonia, Vanuatu	$11 million	None	
Wilma	January 19 – 28, 2011	Category 4 severe tropical cyclone	185 km/h (115 mph)	935 hPa (27.61 inHg)	American Samoa, Fiji, Samoa; Tonga, New Zealand	$22 million	3	
Yasi	January 26 – February 7, 2011	Category 5 severe tropical cyclone	205 km/h (125 mph)	929 hPa (27.43 inHg)	Australia, Fiji, Papua New Guinea; Solomon Islands, Tuvalu, Vanuatu	$2.5 billion	1	
Atu	February 13 – 24, 2011	Category 4 severe tropical cyclone	165 km/h (105 mph)	937 hPa (27.67 inHg)	New Caledonia, Vanuatu	Unknown	None	
Evan	December 9 – 19, 2012	Category 4 severe tropical cyclone	185 km/h (115 mph)	943 hPa (27.85 inHg)	Fiji, Samoa, American Samoa; Wallis and Futuna	$161 million	4	
Freda	December 26, 2012 – January 4, 2013	Category 4 severe tropical cyclone	185 km/h (115 mph)	940 hPa (27.76 inHg)	Solomon Islands, New Caledonia	Unknown	2	
Ian	January 2 – 15, 2014	Category 5 severe tropical cyclone	205 km/h (125 mph)	930 hPa (27.46 inHg)	Fiji, Tonga	$4.3 million	1	
Lusi	March 7 –14, 2014	Category 3 severe tropical cyclone	150 km/h (90 mph)	960 hPa (28.35 inHg)	Fiji, New Caledonia; New Zealand, Vanuatu	$3 million	10	
Pam	March 6 – 15, 2015	Category 5 severe tropical cyclone	250 km/h (155 mph)	896 hPa (26.46 inHg)	Fiji, Kiribati, New Caledonia; New Zealand, Solomon Islands; Tuvalu, Vanuatu	$360 million	16	
Ula	December 26, 2015 – January 12, 2016	Category 4 severe tropical cyclone	185 km/h (115 mph)	945 hPa (27.91 inHg)	American Samoa, Fiji; New Caledonia, Samoa, Tonga; Tuvalu, Vanuatu	Unknown	1	
Winston	February 7 – 25, 2016	Category 5 severe tropical cyclone	280 km/h (175 mph)	884 hPa (26.10 inHg)	Fiji, Niue, Tonga, Vanuatu	$1.4 billion	44	
Cook	April 6 – 11, 2017	Category 3 severe tropical cyclone	155 km/h (100 mph)	961 hPa (28.38 inHg)	Vanuatu, New Caledonia, New Zealand	Moderate	1	
Donna	May 1 – 10, 2017	Category 5 severe tropical cyclone	205 km/h (125 mph)	935 hPa (27.61 inHg)	Solomon Islands, Vanuatu, Fiji; New Caledonia, New Zealand	Significant	2	
Gita	February 3 – 19, 2018	Category 5 severe tropical cyclone	205 km/h (125 mph)	927 hPa (27.37 inHg)	Fiji, Wallis and Futuna, Samoa; American Samoa, Niue, Tonga; New Caledonia, New Zealand	$225 million	2	
Josie	March 29 – April 2, 2018	Category 1 tropical cyclone	75 km/h (45 mph)	993 hPa (29.32 inHg)	Vanuatu, Fiji, Tonga	$5 million	6	
Keni	April 5 – 11, 2018	Category 3 severe tropical cyclone	140 km/h (85 mph)	970 hPa (28.64 inHg)	Vanuatu, Fiji, Tonga	$5 million	None	
Pola	February 23 – March 2, 2019	Category 4 severe tropical cyclone	165 km/h (105 mph)	950 hPa (28.05 inHg)	Wallis and Futuna, Fiji, Tonga			
Sarai	December 23, 2019 – January 2, 2020	Category 2 tropical cyclone	110 km/h (70 mph)	972 hPa (28.70 inHg)	Fiji, Tonga, Niue, Cook Islands	$2.3 million	2	
Tino	January 11 – 20, 2020	Category 3 severe tropical cyclone	120 km/h (75 mph)	970 hPa (28.64 inHg)	Fiji, Niue, Solomon Islands; Samoan Islands, Tonga, Tuvalu, Vanuatu	$583 million		
Yasa	December 11 – 19, 2020	Category 5 severe tropical cyclone	230 km/h (145 mph)	917 hPa (27.08 inHg)	Vanuatu, Fiji	$247 million	4	
Ana	January 26 – February 1, 2021	Category 3 severe tropical cyclone	120 km/h (75 mph)	970 hPa (28.64 inHg)	Fiji	$100 million	1	
Cody	January 5 – 13, 2022	Category 3 severe tropical cyclone	120 km/h (75 mph)	970 hPa (28.64 inHg)	Fiji	$250 million	1	
Judy	February 23 – March 4, 2023	Category 4 severe tropical cyclone	185 km/h (115 mph)	940 hPa (27.76 inHg)	Vanuatu	$4.33 billion (Note: Damage total combined with Kevin.)	None	
Kevin	March 1 – 6, 2023	Category 5 severe tropical cyclone	230 km/h (145 mph)	913 hPa (26.96 inHg)	Solomon Islands, Vanuatu	$4.33 billion (Note: Damage total combined with Judy.)	None	
Lola	October 23 – 27, 2023	Category 5 severe tropical cyclone	215 km/h (130 mph)	930 hPa (27.46 inHg)	Solomon Islands, Vanuatu, New Caledonia	$373 million	1	
Mal	November 10 – 15, 2023	Category 3 severe tropical cyclone	130 km/h (80 mph)	965 hPa (28.50 inHg)	Fiji	Unknown	None	
Rae	February 22 – 26, 2025	Category 2 tropical cyclone	110 km/h (70 mph)	975 hPa (28.79 inHg)	Fiji, Wallis and Futuna, Tonga	Unknown	None	
Vaianu	April 3 – 12, 2026	Category 3 severe tropical cyclone	155 km/h (100 mph)	945 hPa (27.91 inHg)	Fiji, New Zealand	>$1.5 million	None	
(Note: Reference for names retired and season.)

== Retired names sorted by letter ==
Letter	Number of retired names	Retired names	Last addition
A	6	Agatha, Alison, Ami, Ana, Anne, Atu	2021 (Ana)
B	6	Bebe, Beni, Beti, Betsy, Bob, Bola	2003 (Beni)
C	7	Carlotta, Charles, Cilla, Cliff, Cody, Cook, Cora	2022 (Cody)
D	6	Daman, Dani, David, Diana, Donna, Drena	2017 (Donna)
E	5	Elsa, Eric, Esau, Eseta, Evan	2012 (Evan)
F	5	Fay, Fran, Frank, Freda, Funa	2012 (Freda)
G	5	Gavin, Gene, Gita, Gordon, Gyan	2018 (Gita)
H	3	Harry, Heta, Hina	2004 (Heta)
I	4	Ian, Ima, Isaac, Ivy	2014 (Ian)
J	4	Joni, Joti, Josie, Judy	2023 (Judy)
K	6	Keli, Keni, Kerry, Kevin, Kim, Kina	2023 (Kevin)
L	4	Lili, Lisa, Lola, Lusi	2023 (Lola)
M	7	Mal, Marion, Mark, Martin, Meena, Meli, Mick	2023 (Mal)
N	2	Namu, Nancy	2005 (Nancy)
O	5	Ofa, Olaf, Oli, Oscar, Osea	2010 (Oli)
P	7	Pam, Pat, Paula, Peni, Percy, Pola, Prema	2019 (Pola)
R	6	Rae, Raja, Rewa, Robert, Ron, Rosie	2025 (Rae)
S	5	Sally, Sarai, Sina, Sose, Susan	2019 (Sarai)
T	8	Tahmar, Tia, Tina, Tino, Tomas, Trina, Tui, Tusi	2020 (Tino)
U	4	Ula, Ului, Uma, Ursula	2016 (Ula)
V	6	Vaianu, Val, Vania, Veli, Veena, Vivienne	2026 (Vaianu)
W	7	Waka, Wally, Wasa, Wendy, William, Wilma, Winston	2016 (Winston)
Y	2	Yasa, Yasi	2020 (Yasa)

== See also ==
- List of retired Atlantic hurricane names
- List of retired Australian cyclone names
- List of retired Pacific hurricane names
- List of retired Pacific typhoon names
- List of retired Philippine typhoon names
