= List of Samoan Islands tropical cyclones =

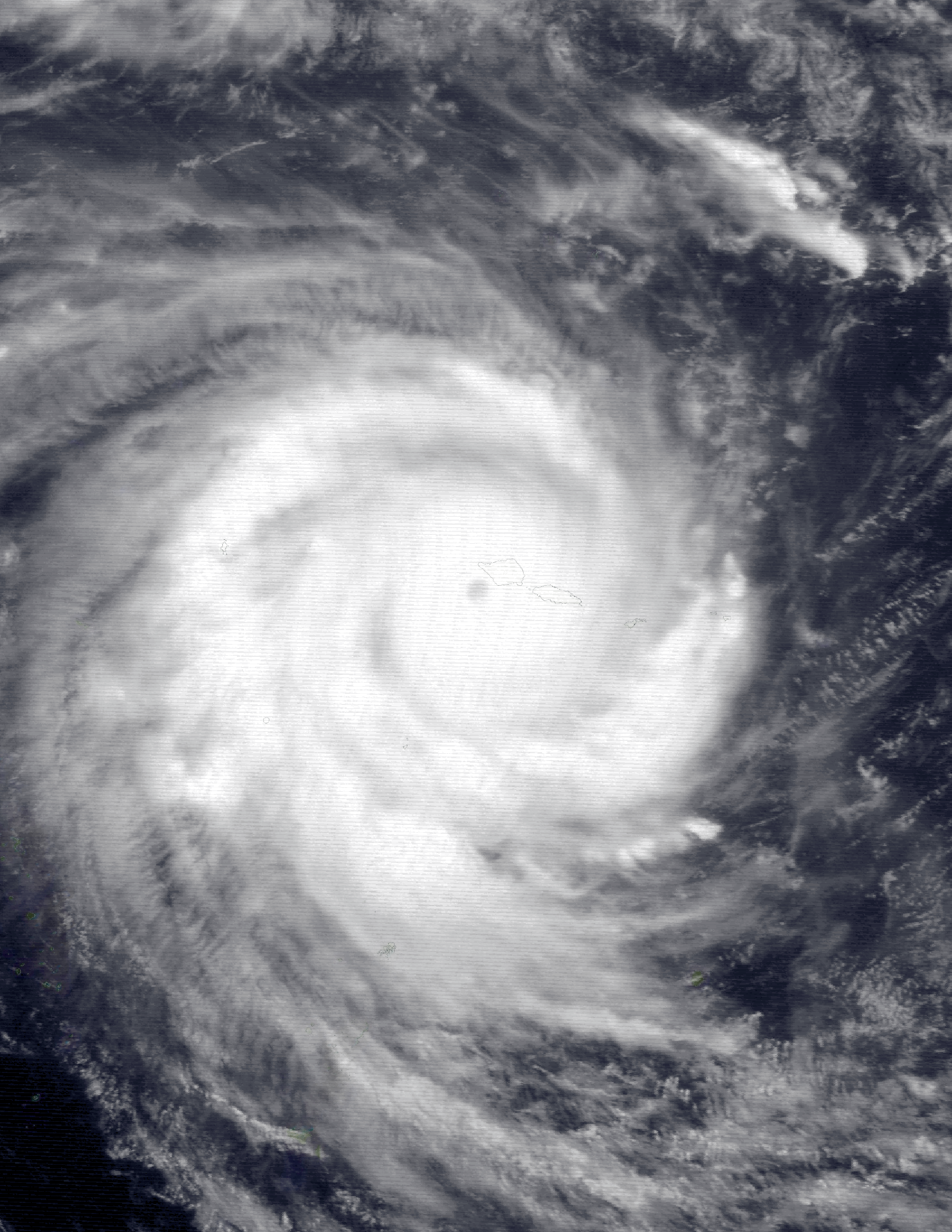
Cyclone Val approaching landfall on Samoa on 8 December

The Samoan Islands are a Polynesian group of volcanic islands located in the South Pacific Ocean to the southwest of Hawaii and have been politically divided into Samoa and American Samoa since the Tripartite Convention of 1899. Tropical cyclones primarily impact the archipelago between November and April of the following year; however, tropical cyclones can impact the islands at any time of the year. On average, one or two tropical cyclones impact the archipelago every year, with systems making landfall every few years.

== Background ==
The Samoan Islands are a Polynesian group of volcanic islands located in the South Pacific Ocean to the southwest of Hawaii. Historically, the islands were discovered and settled during the Lapita era, before Louis-Antoine de Bougainville named the islands the Navigator Islands in 1768.

== Pre-1949 ==
- 20–24 December 1831: A tropical cyclone impacted the Samoan Islands and the Southern Cook Islands.
- 1836: A tropical cyclone impacted the Samoan Islands.
- 29 December 1839: A tropical cyclone impacted the Samoan Islands.
- 16–17 December 1840: A tropical cyclone impacted Samoa.
- 15–18 December 1842: A tropical cyclone impacted the Samoan Islands, felling trees and damaging houses.
- 16–17 March 1846: A tropical cyclone impacted the Samoan Islands.
- April 1848: A tropical cyclone affected American Samoa.
- 24 December 1848: A tropical cyclone affected the Samoan Islands.
- 4–7 April 1850: A tropical cyclone impacted the Samoan Islands, causing severe damage on the island of Tutuila and wrecking two ships and a schooner at Apia. Three people were killed in a landslide.
- April 1855: A tropical cyclone impacted the island of Upolu, wrecking eight European vessels.
- 25 January – 3 February 1865: A tropical cyclone impacted the Samoan Islands.
- January 1870: A cyclone devastated Upolu, while another affected Tutuila.
- 15–21 November 1875: A tropical cyclone impacted Samoa.
- 14–20 March 1877: A tropical cyclone impacted Samoa.
- 3–9 March 1879: A tropical cyclone impacted the Samoan Islands.
- 24–25 March 1883: A tropical cyclone impacted the Samoan Islands.
- 6 January 1886: A tropical cyclone impacted Upolu.
- 9–18 February 1889: A tropical cyclone impacted the Samoan Islands.
- 7–8 March 1889: A tropical cyclone impacted the Samoan Islands.
- 15–16 March 1889: A tropical cyclone struck Apia in the midst of the Samoan crisis between the U.S. and the German Empire. The fleets of both nations were wrecked in Apia harbour, killing 146 German and American sailors.
- 13 January 1890: A tropical cyclone affected Upolu.
- 18 November 1890: A tropical cyclone affected Upolu.
- February 1903: A tropical cyclone impacted the Samoan Islands.
- 13 April 1913: A tropical cyclone impacted American Samoa.
- 18 January 1915: A tropical cyclone impacted the Samoan Islands.
- 12 February 1915: A tropical cyclone impacted American Samoa.
- 16–21 December 1925: A tropical cyclone impacted the Samoan Islands.
- 1–3 January 1926: A tropical cyclone impacted the Samoan Islands.
- 26 March – 3 April 1926: A tropical cyclone impacted Samoa.
- 24–28 November 1927: A tropical cyclone impacted Samoa.
- 24–26 December 1930: A tropical cyclone impacted the Samoan Islands.
- 1–4 January 1933: A tropical cyclone impacted the Samoan Islands.
- 14–19 January 1936: A tropical cyclone impacted Samoa.
- January 1939: A tropical cyclone impacted the Samoan Islands.
- 26 December 1939: A tropical cyclone impacted the Samoan Islands.
- February 1941: A tropical cyclone impacted Samoa.
- 26 February – 6 March 1941: A tropical cyclone impacted Samoa.
- 24–28 November 1941: A tropical cyclone impacted Samoa.
- 16 December 1941: A tropical cyclone impacted Samoa.
- 27–31 January 1944: A tropical cyclone impacted Samoa.
- 15–22 February 1947: A tropical cyclone impacted Samoa.

== 1950–1999 ==
- 31 December 1950 – 4 January 1951: A tropical cyclone impacted the Samoan Islands.
- 13–20 February 1954: A tropical cyclone impacted Samoa.
- 13–17 March 1956: A tropical cyclone passed near Samoa.
- 4–9 February 1957: A tropical cyclone impacted the Samoan Islands.
- 3–12 March 1961: A possible tropical cyclone impacted Samoa.
- 13 June 1964: A tropical cyclone impacted the Samoan Islands, killing 250 people.
- February 1966: A tropical cyclone impacted Samoa.
- 29 January: a hurricane-force cyclone caused severe damage in the Samoan Islands. In Samoa, houses were damaged and destroyed and plantations of bananas and breadfruit destroyed. In American Samoa, damages were at that time estimated to total US$2 million. During the cyclone, a Korean fishing vessel Atu E foundered, with 20 of her crew lost.
- 7–13 February 1968: A tropical cyclone impacted Samoa.
- 9 January 1970: A passing tropical cyclone brought gale-force winds to Samoa.
- March 1981: Cyclone Esau passed through American Samoa.
- 4 - 5 February 1982 - A developing tropical cyclone to the west of the island nations caused flooding as well as widespread damage throughout Samoa.
- 18 January 1987: Cyclone Tusi passed over the Manuʻa Islands of American Samoa Extensive damages to structures and agriculture were reported from Ofu-Olosega and Taʻū, with an estimated 50–100% of buildings damaged on both islands.
- 1–5 February 1990: Cyclone Ofa brought heavy rains and strong winds to the Samoan Islands. Impacts to Samoa were regarded as the worst in 100 years.
- December 1991: Cyclone Val made a devastating landfall on the Samoan island of Savaiʻi on 7 December as a Category 4-equivalent cyclone, followed by another landfall on the American Samoan island of Tutuila on 10 December. Val was regarded as the worst Samoan cyclone since the 1889 Apia cyclone.
- March 13 - 15, 1992 - Tropical Cyclone Gene's precursor tropical depression developed to the north of Samoa and moved southeastwards just to the east of the islands. Strong southerly winds associated with the depression caused minor wind damage, to areas that had been impacted by Severe Tropical Cyclone Val a few months earlier.
- January 4, 1993 - Severe Tropical Cyclone Nina passed just to the south of Samoa, with damage reported to roofs, bananas and breadfruit.
- January 30 - February 1, 1993 - Tropical Cyclone Lin formed to the northwest of Samoa and moved south-southeastwards over Savaii during January 31.
- Mick
- Nina
- January 1997: Cyclone Evan passed by the Samoan Islands.
- 7 - 17 June 1997 - A rainfall total of 95.5 mm (3.76 in) was reported in Afono, American Samoa, in association with Severe Tropical Cyclone Keli.
- 3 January 1998: Cyclone Ron passes by the Samoan Islands, bringing heavy rain.
- 24 - 26 January 1998 - Tropical Cyclone Tui brought gale-force winds, heavy rain and rough seas to the islands, where it caused large crop losses as well as some infrastructure damage on Savaiʻi. However, the damage was considered to be relatively minor, with an estimate of 2.5 million SAT ($850 000 USD) reported in Samoa. A young boy was also killed on Savaiʻi after he stepped into an electrified puddle of water.
- 20 - 21 December 1998 - High winds and heavy rain associated with Severe Tropical Cyclone Cora's precursor tropical depression prompted the cancellation of inter-island flights between the Samoan Islands.

== 2000–present ==
- December 2001: Cyclone Waka's outer bands brought heavy rain and gusty winds to the Samoan Islands. In American Samoa, mild crop damage amounting to US$120,000 occurred.
- February 2005: Cyclone Meena passed 160 km (99 mi) from the Manu'a Islands, bringing gusty winds. Public schools were closed and flights were cancelled in American Samoa.
- 23–24 January 2007: Cyclone Arthur passed through the Samoan Islands as it was developing.

=== 2010-Present ===
- 26–27 January 2010: Tropical Cyclone Nisha caused heavy rain and gale-force winds across the archipelago as it moved south-eastwards and passed within 55 km (35 mi) of Apia.
- 11–13 February 2010: Severe Tropical Cyclone Rene damaged crops and agricultural goods in the Manu'a Islands, while heavy rainfall associated with the system caused landslides and mudslides over Tutuila.
- 23 January 2011: Cyclone Wilma passed directly over American Samoa, bringing strong winds and heavy rainfall. Trees and power lines were downed, and several structures had their roofs blown off. Three people died due to drowning.

Damage from Cyclone Evan in Apia, Samoa

- 11–15 December 2012: Cyclone Evan affects the Samoan Islands, causing widespread damage in Apia. 14 deaths were recorded in Samoa, while damages totalled an estimated US$204 million.
- December 2015: As Cyclone Ula passed by American Samoa, a fisherman went missing in Faleāsao after being swept out to sea.
- 23 April 2016: Cyclone Amos passes near the Samoan Islands. Heavy rainfall affected Samoa, and about 70% of the country lost power due to high winds.
- 8–9 February 2018: Cyclone Gita passed within 100 km of the Samoan Islands, bringing torrential rainfall and strong winds to Samoa and American Samoa. The cargo ship Uila o le Sami sunk offshore from American Samoa, while the adrift vessel Chui Kai Fa No. 1 was grounded, forcing the closure of Pago Pago's port until 11 February. Gita caused $10 million in damages to Samoa's power grid. In American Samoa damages were estimated to total $52 million, exacerbating a downturn in the territory's fishing industry.
- 18–19 January 2020: Cyclone Tino's outer rainbands brought squally conditions to the Samoan Islands as it passed to the south. Strong winds toppled billboards and trees while power outages affected several communities in Samoa. A ferry was damaged in American Samoa.

== See also ==
- Tropical cyclone effects by region
