= South Pacific tropical cyclone =

Tropical cyclone having formed in the South Pacific Ocean

A South Pacific tropical cyclone is a non-frontal, low pressure system that has developed, within an environment of warm sea surface temperatures and little vertical wind shear aloft in the South Pacific Ocean. Within the Southern Hemisphere there are officially three areas where tropical cyclones develop on a regular basis, these areas are the South-West Indian Ocean between Africa and 90°E, the Australian region between 90°E and 160°E and the South Pacific basin between 160°E and 120°W. The South Pacific basin between 160°E and 120°W is officially monitored by the Fiji Meteorological Service and New Zealand's MetService, while others like the Australian Bureau of Meteorology and the United States National Oceanic and Atmospheric Administration also monitor the basin. Each tropical cyclone year within this basin starts on July 1 and runs throughout the year, encompassing the tropical cyclone season which runs from November 1 and lasts until April 30 each season. Within the basin, most tropical cyclones have their origins within the South Pacific Convergence Zone or within the Northern Australian monsoon trough, both of which form an extensive area of cloudiness and are dominant features of the season. Within this region a tropical disturbance is classified as a tropical cyclone, when it has 10-minute sustained wind speeds of more than 65 km/h (40 mph), that wrap halfway around the low-level circulation centre, while a severe tropical cyclone is classified when the maximum 10-minute sustained wind speeds are greater than 120 km/h (75 mph).

== Basin history ==
Tropical cyclones have occurred over the southern Pacific Ocean since prehistoric times, with Polynesians and other ancient mariners having some knowledge of them. These mariners were keen observers of nature with their knowledge of these systems, reflected by traditional myths and legends. When Europeans started to settle and colonise the South Pacific, they realised that the region was not free of hurricanes and were the first to publish accounts about the systems. During 1853, Thomas Dobson subsequently became the first person to collect information about these systems, in order to attempt to understand and explain the characteristics of 24 tropical cyclones. However, these descriptions were vague and of little value, because he only had a small amount of data and no synoptic weather charts.

Over the next 40 years various reports, journals and logbooks on the storms were published, before E. Knipping consolidated some of these reports and extended Dobson's list out to 120 tropical cyclones during 1893. During the 1920s Stephen Sargent Visher did some research into tropical cyclones in the Pacific and visited several island nations, including Fiji, Japan and the Philippines, to obtain information on potential systems. He also consulted various journals and reports as well as Dobson's and Knipping's work, before he authored a number of papers on tropical cyclones in the Pacific. These papers contained information about 259 tropical storms in the South Pacific between 160°E and 140°W, two of which occurred during 1789 and 1819, while the rest occurred between 1830 and 1923. Visher also tried to estimate how many systems were occurring on an annual basis in each area, but overcompensated for his incomplete records and came up with a figure of 12 severe tropical cyclones per year.

In the years building up to World War II, Visher's work became the primary source for information about tropical cyclones in the South Pacific. However, there was not enough information available to allow for an accurate depiction of tropical cyclone tracks.

During Visher's time and until the start of World War II, there was not enough. However, in the build-up to and during World War II, meteorological operations in the Pacific were greatly expanded, to meet the needs of international aviation and military operations. As a result, J W Hutchings decided to write a paper on 43 tropical cyclones between 1940 and 1951, using data that had been collected from the tropics by the New Zealand Meteorological Service in the area between the 150°E and 150°W. In the paper, systems were only included if they had a wind speed on the Beaufort scale of Force 9 or above (corresponding to a medium Category 1 on the Australian cyclone scale), while located between the Equator and 30°S. Hutchings also examined where tropical cyclones originated from in the South Pacific and claimed that the place where most tropical cyclones develop could be accurately determined. The paper also drew attention to a marked difference in the tracks of South Pacific tropical cyclones and systems in other basins. This work was subsequently extended in 1956, by the then director of the New Zealand Meteorological Service: John Fletcher Gabites, to cover the seasons between 1952–53 and 1955–56. Gabites subsequently wrote a series of papers during 1963 on various aspects of South Pacific tropical cyclones including on the wide variety of tracks that occur over the Pacific.

At the start of the 1980s, geostationary satellite imagery became available, which allowed meteorologists to closely monitor any developments and lowered the chances of missing a well developed tropical cyclone to nil. During June 1995, the Fiji Meteorological Service's Nadi — Tropical Cyclone Centre, was designated as a Regional Specialized Meteorological Center by the World Meteorological Organization.

== Seasons ==
=== Before 1970 ===
- Pre 1900 South Pacific cyclone seasons
- 1900–1939 South Pacific cyclone seasons
- 1940s South Pacific cyclone seasons
- 1950s South Pacific cyclone seasons
- 1960s South Pacific cyclone seasons

=== 1970s ===
Season	Total TDs	Total TCs	Total STCs	Strongest storm	Deaths	Damages	Notes and References
1969–70	7	7	2	3 Dolly and Emma	6	5 million (USD)	
1970–71	8	8	0	2 Lena	Unknown	Unknown	
1971–72	9	9	6	3 Carlotta	Unknown	Unknown	
1972–73	8	8	2	3 Bebe	25	$20 million (USD)	
1973–74	10	10	2	4 Pam	Unknown	Unknown	
1974–75	5	5	3	3 Val and Alison	Unknown	Unknown	
1975–76	6	6	3	3 David	Unknown	Unknown	
1976–77	9	9	2	3 Robert	Unknown	Unknown	
1977–78	7	7	3	3 Bob and Charles	Unknown	Unknown	
1978–79	9	6	2	3 Meli	Unknown	Unknown	
1979–80	8	7	2	3 Peni and Sina	Unknown	Unknown	

=== 1980s ===
During the 1980s there were three major Southern Oscillation episodes; two El Niño's (1982–83 and 1986/87) when the Southern Oscillation Index (SOI) was negative and one La Nina when the SOI was positive.

Season	Total TDs	Total TCs	Total STCs	Strongest storm	Deaths	Damages	Notes and References
1980–81	12	12	4	3 Freda			
1981–82	6	6	5	4 Gyan			
1982–83	14	14	9	4 Oscar			
1983–84	7	5	1	3 Beti			
1984–85	9	9	5	5 Hina			
1985–86	7	7	3	4 Ima	>150		
1986–87	13	12	6	4 Uma	50	$150 million	
1987–88	6	5	3	4 Anne			
1988–89	14	14	6	4 Harry			
1989–90	11	5	2	4 Ofa	8	$180 million	
Totals	103	94	46	Hina			

=== 1990s ===
Season	Total TDs	Total TCs	Total STCs	Strongest storm	Deaths	Damages	Retired names	Notes and References
1990–91	4	2	1	3 Sina	None	$18.5 million	Sina	
1991–92	13	11	7	5 Fran	21		Tia, Wasa, Val, Betsy, Esau, Fran	
1992–93	12	10	6	4 Joni and Prema	None		Joni, Kina, Nina	
1993–94	7	5	4	4 Theodore	None		Rewa	
1994–95	4	3	1	3 Violet	None	$2.5 million	William	
1995–96	7	5	1	4 Beti	2	$4.3 million	Beti	
1996–97	14	12	6	4 Gavin	27	$44 million	Drena, Gavin, Hina, Keli	(Note: During the 1996–97 South Pacific cyclone season, 11 tropical cyclones formed within the FMS's area of responsibility, while one formed within the subtropics and TCWC Wellington's area of responsibility.)
1997–98	20	16	7	5 Ron and Susan	50	$7.6 million	Martin, Osea, Ron, Susan, Tui, Ursula, Veli	
1998–99	27	8	4	4 Dani			Cora, Frank	
1999–2000	25	6	4	4 Kim	1		Kim	
Totals	134	80	41	Ron/Susan	101			

=== 2000s ===
During the 2000s, activity was generally below the long term average, with 60 tropical cyclones developing out of 160 tropical disturbances and tropical depressions. However activity during the 2002–03, 2004–05 and 2009–10 seasons all experienced activity, near the long term average of about 8 - 9 tropical cyclones.

Season	Total TDs	Total TCs	Total STCs	Strongest storm	Deaths	Damages (USD)	Retired names	Notes and References
2000–01	16	5	1	4 Paula	7	$800,000	Paula, Sose	
2001–02	16	5	2	4 Waka	1	$51.3 million	Trina, Waka	
2002–03	18	10	7	5 Zoe	50	$102 million	Zoe, Ami, Beni, Cilla	
2003–04	15	3	2	5 Heta	16	$387 million	Heta, Ivy	
2004–05	18	9	5	5 Percy	2	$55 million	Meena, Nancy, Olaf, Percy	
2005–06	15	5	3	3 Wati	None	$26,000	None	
2006–07	15	6	2	4 Xavier	4	$4 million	Cliff	
2007–08	16	4	3	4 Daman	8	$46 million	Daman, Funa, Gene	
2008–09	15	6	0	2 Lin	11	$65 million	None	
2009–10	15	8	5	5 Ului	12	$163 million	Mick, Oli, Pat, Tomas, Ului	
Totals	159	60	30	Zoe	111	874 million		

=== 2010s ===
Season	Total TDs	Total TCs	Total STCs	Strongest storm	Deaths	Damages (USD)	Retired names	Notes and References
2010–11	17	7	5	4 Wilma	4	$25 million	Vania, Wilma, Yasi, Atu	(Note: Number of tropical cyclones excludes Tropical Cyclone Anthony, which was considered to have weakened into a tropical low before moving into the South Pacific basin by the Australian Bureau of Meteorology during post analysis.)
2011–12	20	3	1	4 Jasmine	13	$17.2 million	None	
2012–13	22	5	4	4 Sandra	17	$161 million	Evan, Freda	
2013–14	20	6	2	5 Ian	12	$48 million	Ian, Lusi	
2014–15	16	6	2	5 Pam	16	> $250 million	Pam	
2015–16	18	8	5	5 Winston	50	≥ $1.41 billion	Ula, Winston	Featured Winston, the strongest tropical cyclone ever recorded in the Southern Hemisphere (Note: Number of tropical disturbances excludes Tropical Cyclone Raquel, which was considered by the Australian Bureau of Meteorology to be a Category 1 tropical cyclone within the 2014–15 year.)
2016–17	22	4	2	5 Donna	3	≥ $5 million	Cook, Donna	
2017–18	14	6	3	5 Gita	11	$285 million	Gita, Josie, Keni	
2018–19	12	5	2	4 Pola	None	≥ $50 million	Pola	
2019–20	12	8	4	5 Harold	5	≥ $132 million	Sarai, Tino	
Totals	166	53	28	Winston	131	≥ $2.25 billion		

=== 2020s ===
Season	Total TDs	Total TCs	Total STCs	Strongest storm	Deaths	Damages (USD)	Retired names	Notes and References
2020–21	13	8	3	5 Yasa	7	>$255 million	Yasa, Ana	
2021–22	11	6	2	4 Dovi	2	$96.9 million	Cody	
2022–23	7	5	3	5 Kevin	16	$11.1 billion	Judy, Kevin	Featuring the costliest tropical cyclone ever recorded in the basin, Gabrielle
2023–24	8	4	2	5 Lola	4	$352 million	Lola, Mal	
2024–25	11	4	0	2 Rae	0	Unknown	Rae	First season since the 2008–09 season not to have a severe tropical cyclone
2025–26	7	2	1	3 Vaianu	0	$46.8 million	Vaianu	Tied 1990-91 season for fewest named storms (2); Featured the latest named tropical cyclone in the season, Urmil; Vaianu was the first severe tropical cyclone since Mal in November 2023, and the first Category 3-equivalent tropical cyclone in the basin since Lola in October 2023.
2026–27	2	2	1	5 Xavier	0	None	N/A	The earliest start to a season since 2018-19; Features Xavier, the most intense tropical cyclone in the South Pacific since 2016.
Totals	38	24	9	Xavier	25	>$11.8 billion		

== See also ==
- Tropical cyclone
- List of retired South Pacific cyclone names
- Atlantic hurricane season
- Pacific hurricane season
- Pacific typhoon season
- North Indian Ocean tropical cyclone
- South-West Indian Ocean tropical cyclone
- Australian region tropical cyclone
- South Atlantic tropical cyclone
- Mediterranean tropical-like cyclone
