= Cyclone Isaac =

South Pacific cyclone in 1982

Severe Tropical Cyclone Isaac
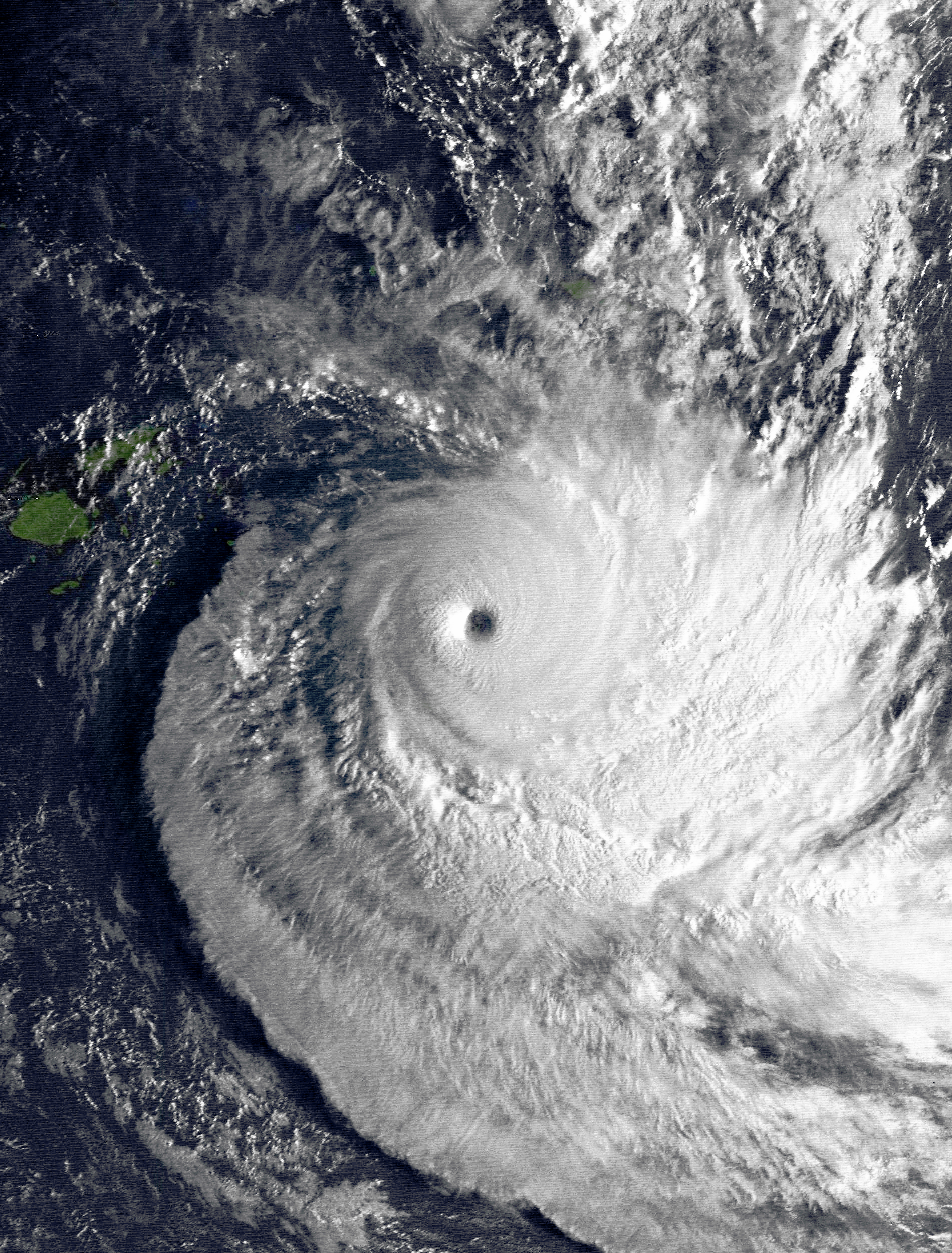
- Cyclone Isaac moving over Tonga near peak intensity on 2 March

Meteorological history
- Formed: 27 February 1982
- Dissipated: 5 March 1982

Category 4 severe tropical cyclone
- 10-minute sustained (MetService)
- Highest winds: 175 km/h (110 mph)
- Lowest pressure: 930 hPa (mbar); 27.46 inHg

Category 4-equivalent tropical cyclone
- 1-minute sustained (SSHWS/JTWC)
- Highest winds: 240 km/h (150 mph)
- Lowest pressure: 943 hPa (mbar); 27.85 inHg

Overall effects
- Fatalities: 6
- Damage: $10 million (1982 USD)
- Areas affected: Tonga
- IBTrACS
- Part of the 1981–82 South Pacific cyclone season

Severe Tropical Cyclone Isaac was a South Pacific tropical cyclone that severely affected Tonga in 1982. On 27 February, the Fiji Meteorological Service started to monitor an area of low pressure within the South Pacific Convergence Zone to the southwest of Tokelau. It continued to develop northeast of Samoa while travelling southwest and was named Isaac after becoming a tropical cyclone on 1 March. Isaac moved through the Haʻapai island group and only 50 km (31 mi) northwest of Tongatapu.

== Meteorological history ==
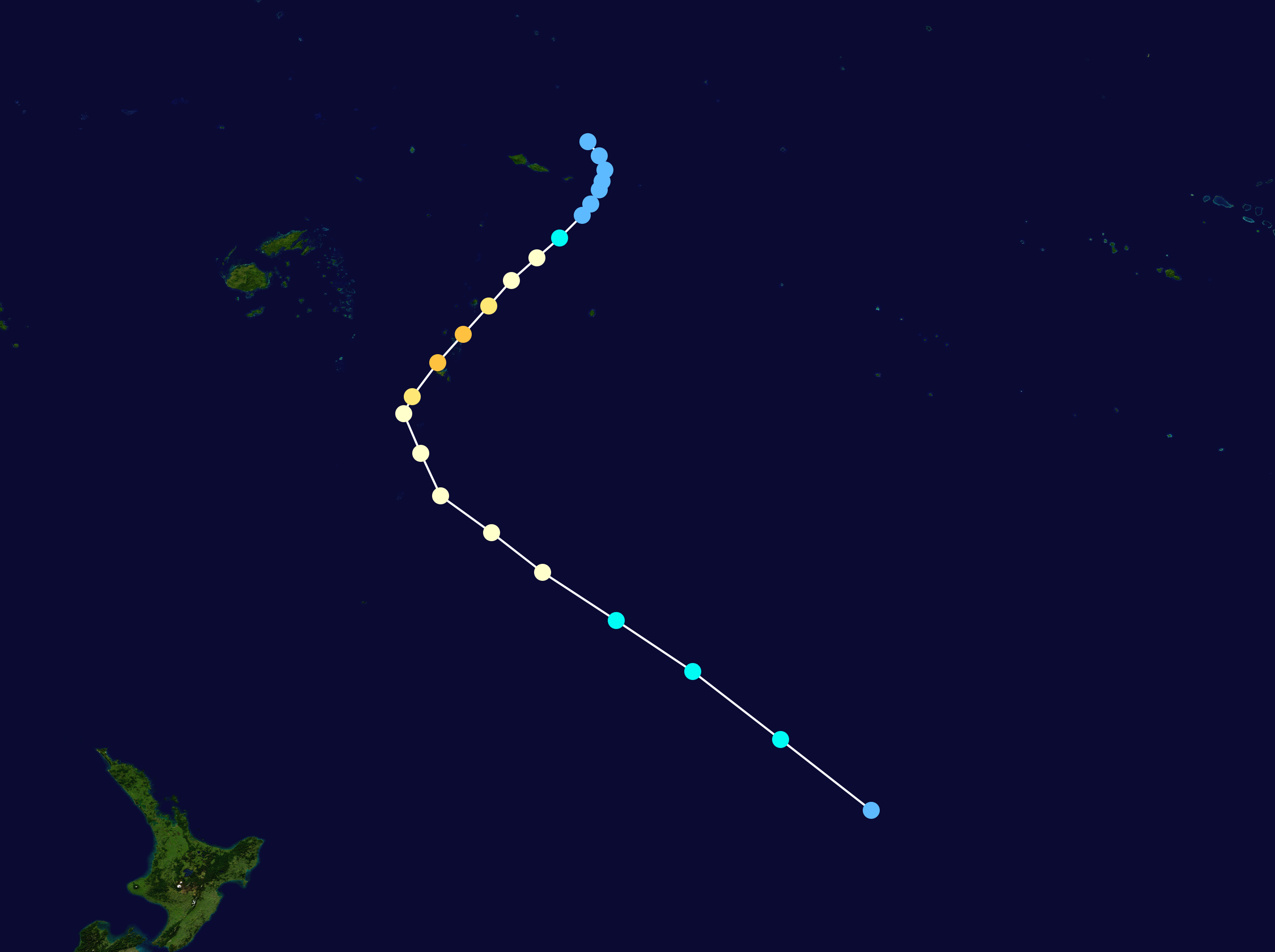
Map plotting the storm's track and intensity, according to the Saffir–Simpson scale Map key Saffir–Simpson scale Tropical depression (≤38 mph, ≤62 km/h) Tropical storm (39–73 mph, 63–118 km/h) Category 1 (74–95 mph, 119–153 km/h) Category 2 (96–110 mph, 154–177 km/h) Category 3 (111–129 mph, 178–208 km/h) Category 4 (130–156 mph, 209–251 km/h) Category 5 (≥157 mph, ≥252 km/h) Unknown Storm type Tropical cyclone Subtropical cyclone Extratropical cyclone, remnant low, tropical disturbance, or monsoon depression

On 27 February 1982, an area of low pressure that had developed within the South Pacific Convergence Zone about 300 km (185 mi) to the southwest of Tokelau. That day, the system moved southeastwards and developed into a tropical depression as it passed about 100 km (60 mi) to the southwest of Swains Island. The system continued to develop the next day as it moved southwestwards and passed near or over American Samoa's Manu'a Islands. During this time, the system had been gradually developing, before it was declared to be a tropical cyclone and named Isaac by the FMS early on 1 March.

Isaac continued to intensify on 1 March, with an eye becoming visible on satellite imagery. Isaac subsequently continued to move southwestwards and started to impact Tonga during 2 March before it directly passed over the island group of Ha'apai at around 1800 UTC (0700 TOT, 3 March). Six hours later, the system passed about 25 km (15 mi) to the west of Tongatapu as it peaked in intensity with 10-minute sustained winds of around 175 km/h (110 mph). This made Isaac equivalent to a modern-day Category 4 severe tropical cyclone on the Australian tropical cyclone intensity scale. On 3 March, after the system had peaked in intensity, it recurved southeastwards and rapidly weakened as vertical wind shear over the system increased. The system was last noted on 5 March, while it was located about 2,000 km (1,245 mi) to the southeast of Tongatapu.

In September 2017, a study was published by the Royal Meteorological Society in which the intensity of Isaac was reanalyzed. The authors of the study estimated that at its peak Isaac had 1-minute sustained windspeeds of 240 km/h (150 mph), which would make it a Category 4-equivalent tropical cyclone on the Saffir-Simpson scale.

== Preparations, impact, and aftermath ==
Severe Tropical Cyclone Isaac impacted Tonga on 2 and 3 March. Ahead of the system affecting Tonga, a tropical cyclone alert was issued for the nation by the FMS on 1 March, and cyclone warnings were issued for the Ha'apai and Tongatapu island groups the next day. When the system hit, the pressure at Tongatapu fell to 976.4 mbar (28.83 inHg). Winds of 92 knots were measured at Nukuʻalofa, and rainfall of 120 millimetres (4.7 in) was measured there. Isaac reached maximum intensity on 2 March. The tropical cyclone was considered the worst storm in Tonga's history, devastating the island group. The island groups of Ha'apai and Vava'u were hit worst. Six were killed, while 45,000 became homeless and 95% of the livestock was killed. The island of Tatafa was bisected by a 16 metres (52 ft) wide channel caused by Isaac's storm surge. Tonga's only power station was "leveled", causing the entire nation to be without power. More than a tenth of the nation's schools were destroyed.

Following the cyclone, the Australian government sent six Lockheed C-130 Hercules planes, filled with food, medical supplies, and 50 army engineers and communications personnel. An air lift was also set up. To replace the destroyed schools, cyclone-proof replacements were built, with prefabricated versions used instead for the outer islands.

== See also ==
- List of Category 4 South Pacific severe tropical cyclones
- Cyclone Ron
- Cyclone Waka
- Cyclone Heta
- Cyclone Vaianu
- Cyclone Wilma
- Cyclone Ula
