= Cyclone Osea =

Category 3 South Pacific cyclone in 1997

Severe Tropical Cyclone Osea
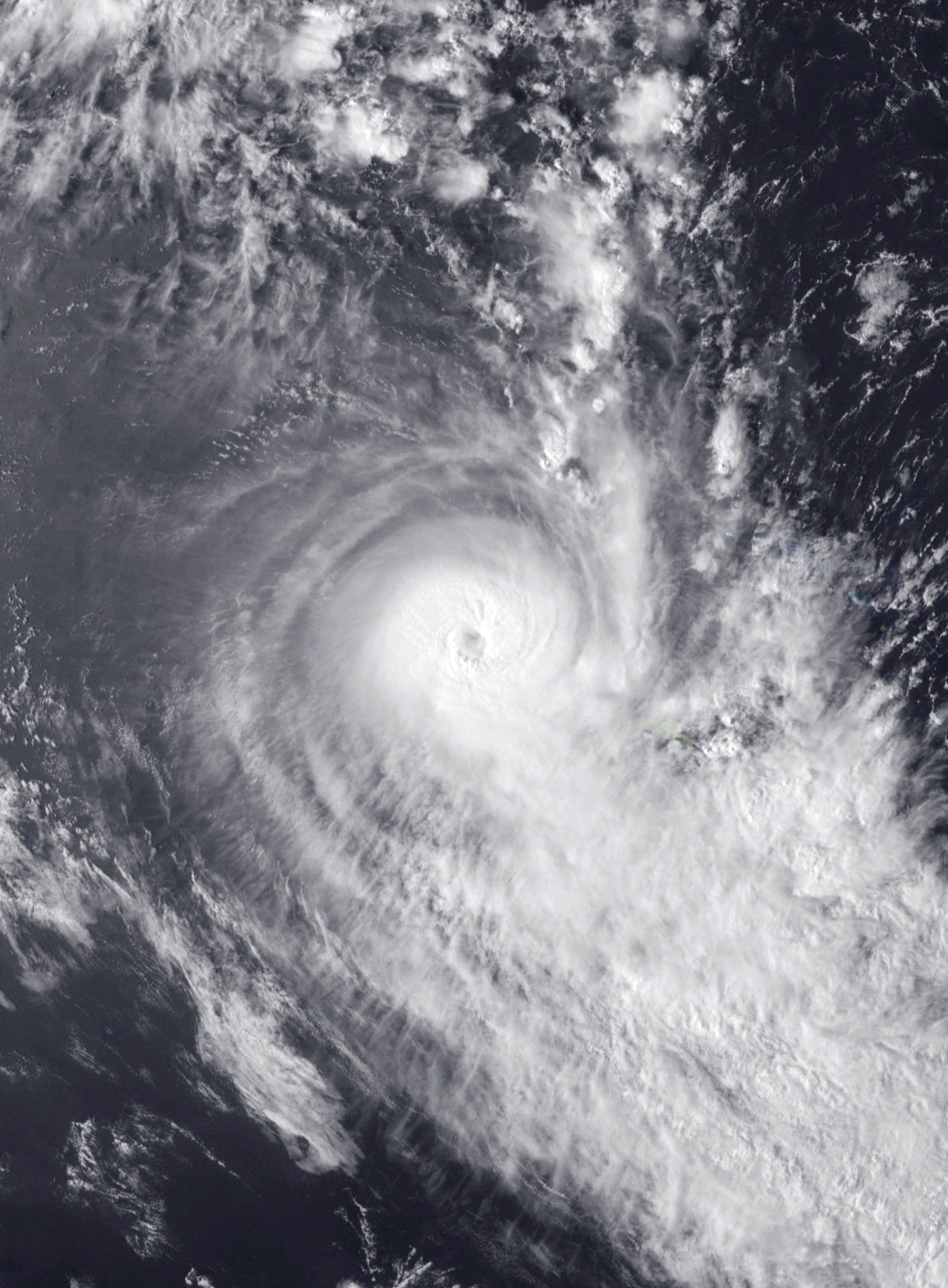
- Cyclone Osea near peak intensity on November 26

Meteorological history
- Formed: November 24, 1997
- Dissipated: November 28, 1997

Category 3 severe tropical cyclone
- 10-minute sustained (FMS)
- Highest winds: 150 km/h (90 mph)
- Lowest pressure: 950 hPa (mbar); 28.05 inHg

Category 2-equivalent tropical cyclone
- 1-minute sustained (SSHWS/NPMOC)
- Highest winds: 165 km/h (105 mph)
- Lowest pressure: 954 hPa (mbar); 28.17 inHg

Overall effects
- Fatalities: None
- Areas affected: French Polynesia
- IBTrACS
- Part of the 1997–98 South Pacific cyclone season

Severe Tropical Cyclone Osea was the second of seven cyclones to affect French Polynesia during the 1997–98 South Pacific cyclone season. The fourth tropical cyclone and second severe tropical cyclone of the very active season, Osea began as a low that formed on November 22, and the storm initially remained weak. Moving south and later east, it was named Osea on November 24 after achieving windspeeds equal to a Category 1 cyclone on the Australian tropical cyclone intensity scale. Continuing to intensify, Osea soon reached its peak intensity of 90 mph (145 km/h). Afterwards, Osea began to weaken because of increased wind shear, and the cyclone started moving southeast. By November 28, Osea was no longer a tropical cyclone.

The cyclone brought major damage to some islands in French Polynesia. Around 95% of the infrastructure in Maupiti was destroyed, including 77 homes, an airport, and a town hall. About 30% of the infrastructure in Bora-Bora was destroyed, as well as 309 homes and many yachts. Many roads were also damaged. Almost everything on the north side of the island was destroyed. However, no deaths were reported. The name Osea was retired after this usage of the name.

== Meteorological history ==
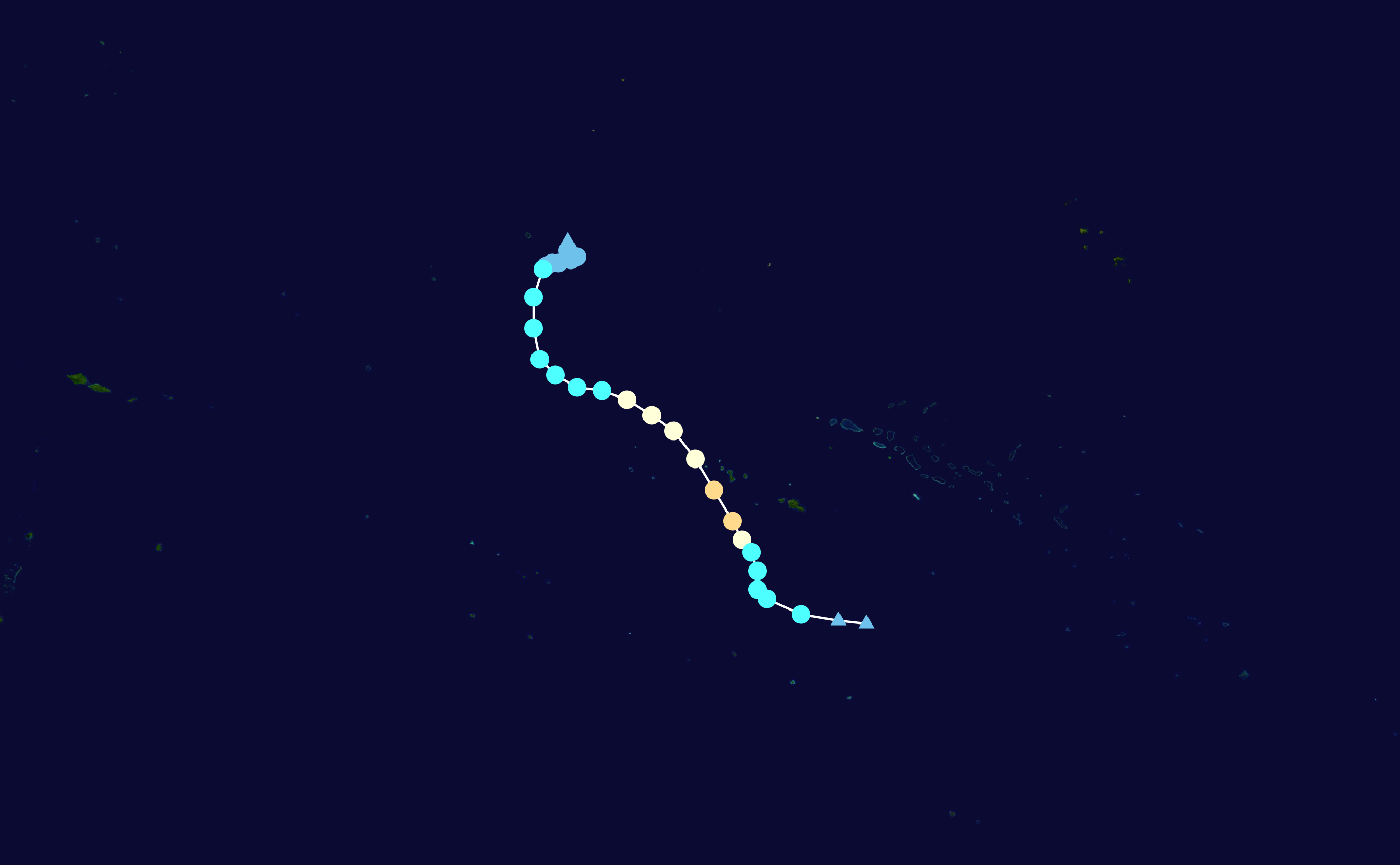
Map plotting the storm's track and intensity, according to the Saffir–Simpson scale Map key Saffir–Simpson scale Tropical depression (≤38 mph, ≤62 km/h) Tropical storm (39–73 mph, 63–118 km/h) Category 1 (74–95 mph, 119–153 km/h) Category 2 (96–110 mph, 154–177 km/h) Category 3 (111–129 mph, 178–208 km/h) Category 4 (130–156 mph, 209–251 km/h) Category 5 (≥157 mph, ≥252 km/h) Unknown Storm type Tropical cyclone Subtropical cyclone Extratropical cyclone, remnant low, tropical disturbance, or monsoon depression

On November 22, 1997, the Fiji Meteorological Service (FMS) and the Naval Pacific Meteorology and Oceanography Center (NPMOC) started to monitor a tropical depression that had developed about 465 km (290 mi) to the northeast of the Northern Cook Island: Manihiki. Over the next two days the depression gradually developed further, as it slowly moved southwards towards a weakness in a subtropical ridge of high pressure. At 1200 UTC on November 23, the NPMOC reported that the depression had become equivalent to a tropical storm and assigned it the designation 06P. Twelve hours later the FMS named the system Osea after it had developed into a Category 1 tropical cyclone on the Australian tropical cyclone intensity scale. Thereafter, Osea started moving towards the southeast, as an area of high pressure started to develop to the south of the system.

During November 25, the FMS estimated that Osea had become a Category 3 severe tropical cyclone, while the NPMOC announced that the system had become equivalent to a Category 1 hurricane on the Saffir-Simpson hurricane wind scale as it moved through French Polynesia. The next day both agency's reported that Severe Tropical Cyclone Osea had reached its peak intensity. The FMS reported 10-minute sustained winds of 150 km/h (90 mph); the NPMOC reported peak 1-minute sustained windspeeds of 165 km/h (105 mph) which made it equivalent to a Category 2 hurricane on the SSHS. After attaining peak intensity, Osea gradually weakened. By November 27, the NPMOC had issued their final warning on the system because the convection had become dislocated over 185 km (115 mi) from the low-level circulation center due to increased wind shear. The FMS subsequently monitored Osea for another 24 hours, before it was last noted by the agency on November 28, around the time it degenerated into a tropical depression.

== Preparations, impact, and aftermath ==
Prior the arrival of Cyclone Osea on November 24, various cyclone alerts and warnings were issued for the whole of French Polynesia, while authorities strengthened security measures and advised people not to drive. Throughout the archipelago schools were closed. Furthermore, people on the atoll of Scilly were evacuated by helicopter to other islands.

Cyclone Osea was extremely destructive to some of the islands in French Polynesia. Over 700 homes were destroyed or severely damaged on Maupiti, Bora-Bora, and Raiatea. Several roofs were blown off of buildings across the archipelago. On Maupiti, an island with a population of 1,100, about 95% of the infrastructure was destroyed. The town hall, two schools, and an airfield were destroyed. The town hall was originally being used as an emergency shelter, but was later evacuated due to strong winds and was later destroyed. Furthermore, many roadways and highways were blocked due to flooding. In addition, 77 homes on the island were destroyed. All but three homes that belonged to Mormons on the island were destroyed.

On Bora-Bora, an island which had a population of 4,500 at the time, roughly 30% of the infrastructure was destroyed, including 309 houses. Hotels were also impacted during the storm. On the north side of Bora Bora, nearly everything was destroyed, including the village of Vaitape and a local yacht club. Across Vaitape, roads were blocked by fallen trees and telecommunication lines were severed due to high winds. Seven people on the island were reportedly slightly injured. In addition, the islands of Tahaa, Raiatea, and Moorea all sustained damage, though yachts in Raiatea managed to survive unscathed. In another archipelago, 700 homes and various public infrastructures were at least somewhat destroyed by Osea. In addition to the impact on infrastructure, banana trees were knocked down due to the winds, especially in mountain gardens. Throughout the impacted region, no deaths were reported.

Osea was the second tropical cyclone to impact French Polynesia during the season; Cyclone Martin had impacted the islands a few weeks earlier. In the aftermath of the storm, disaster aid was delivered to the victims of Osea. President Gaston Flosse, accompanied by technicians, arrived in Maupiti to help repair the island's electrical and hydraulic systems. A Latter-Day Saint meeting house was used as an emergency shelter, though the house itself sustained minor damage from the storm. The name Osea was later retired from the South Pacific list of tropical cyclone names.

== See also ==
- List of retired South Pacific tropical cyclone names
