= Cyclone Meena =

2005 South Pacific tropical cyclone

Severe Tropical Cyclone Meena
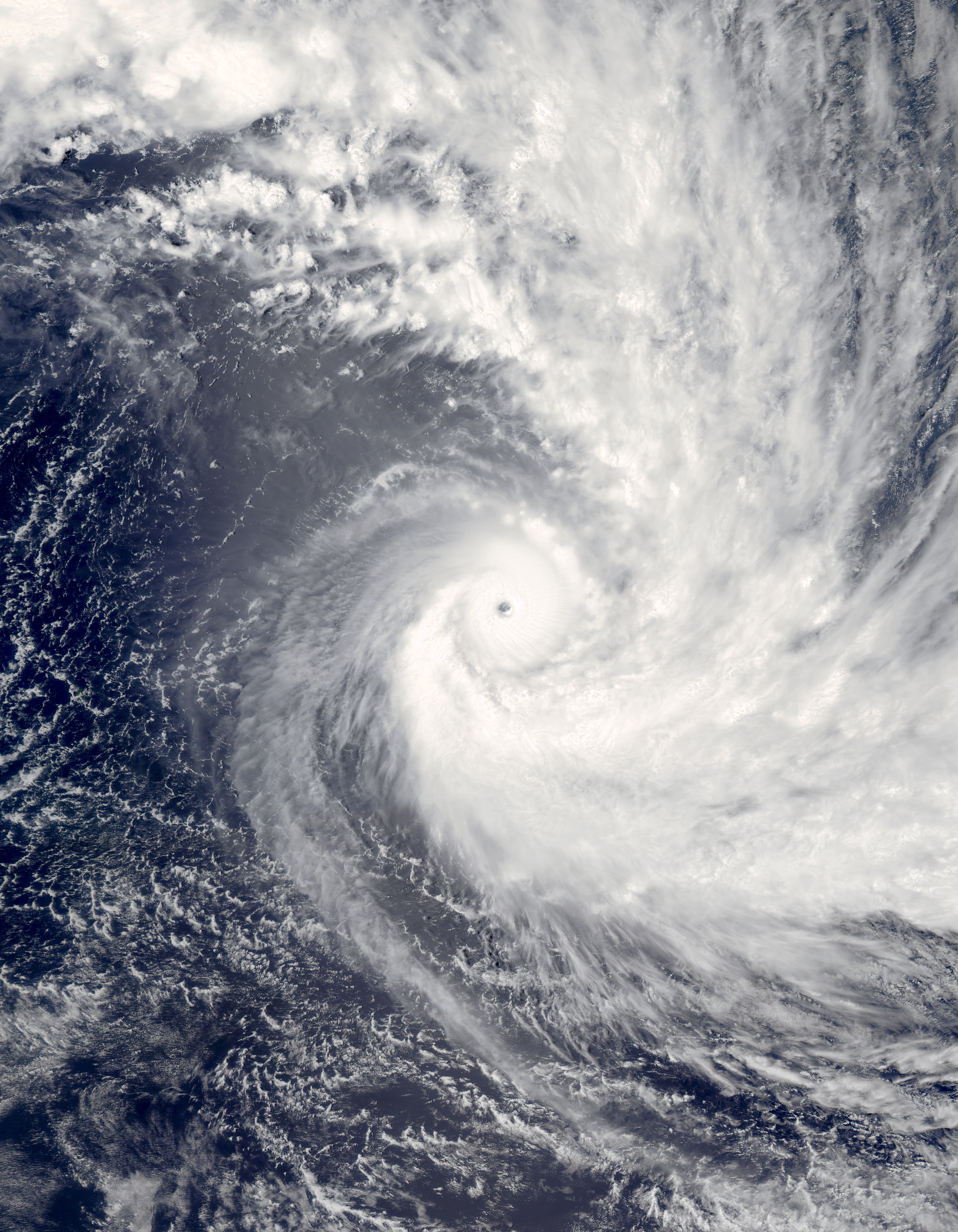
- Cyclone Meena near its peak intensity

Meteorological history
- Formed: February 1, 2005
- Dissipated: February 11, 2005

Category 5 severe tropical cyclone
- 10-minute sustained (FMS)
- Highest winds: 215 km/h (130 mph)
- Lowest pressure: 915 hPa (mbar); 27.02 inHg

Category 4-equivalent tropical cyclone
- 1-minute sustained (SSHWS/JTWC)
- Highest winds: 230 km/h (145 mph)
- Lowest pressure: 916 hPa (mbar); 27.05 inHg

Overall effects
- Fatalities: None
- Areas affected: American Samoa, Cook Islands
- Part of the 2004–05 South Pacific cyclone season

Severe Tropical Cyclone Meena was the first of four tropical cyclones to impact the Cook Islands during February 2005. The system was first identified within a trough of low pressure, about 620 km (385 mi) to the northwest of Pago Pago in American Samoa.

== Meteorological history ==
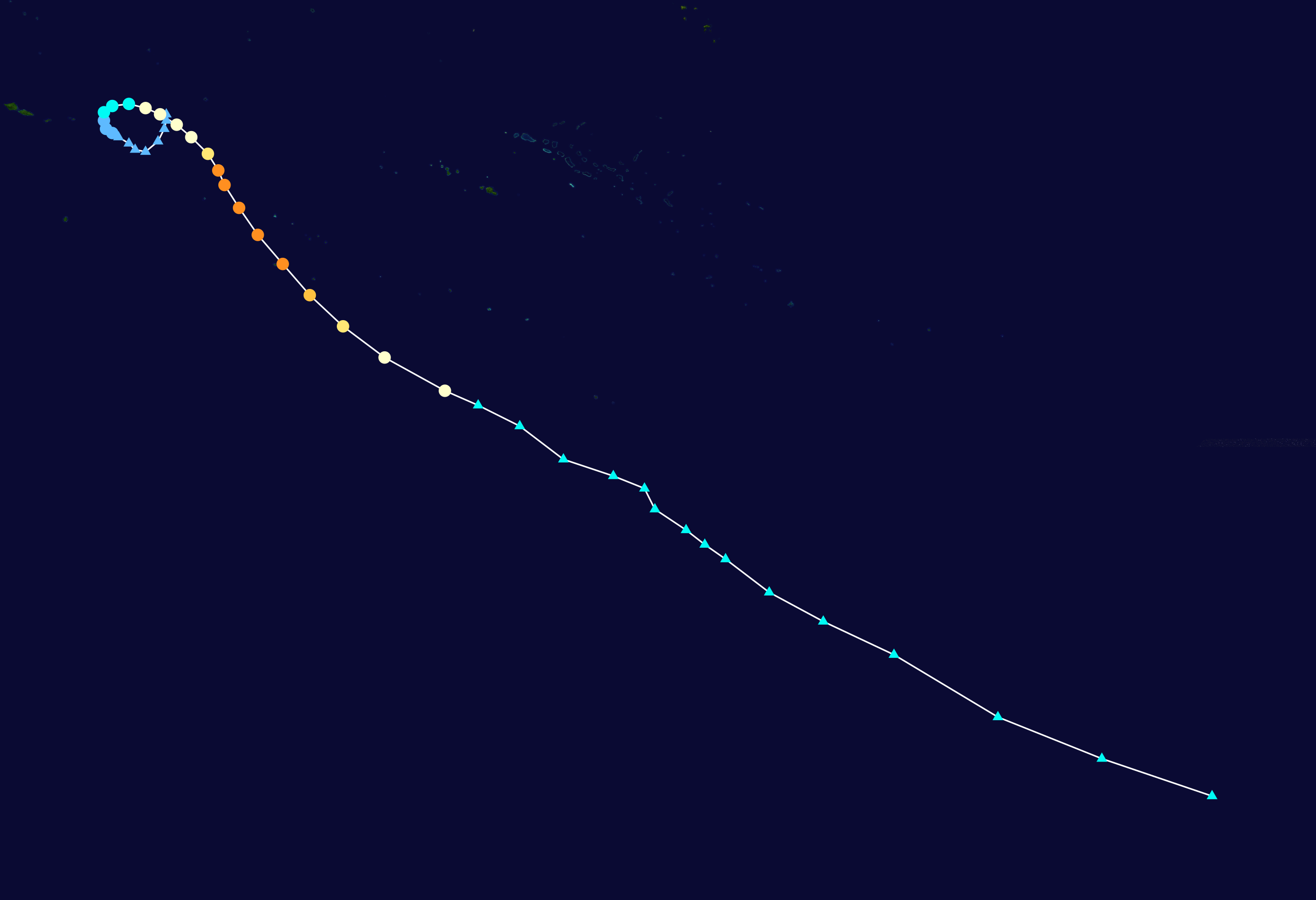
Map plotting the storm's track and intensity, according to the Saffir–Simpson scale Map key Saffir–Simpson scale Tropical depression (≤38 mph, ≤62 km/h) Tropical storm (39–73 mph, 63–118 km/h) Category 1 (74–95 mph, 119–153 km/h) Category 2 (96–110 mph, 154–177 km/h) Category 3 (111–129 mph, 178–208 km/h) Category 4 (130–156 mph, 209–251 km/h) Category 5 (≥157 mph, ≥252 km/h) Unknown Storm type Tropical cyclone Subtropical cyclone Extratropical cyclone, remnant low, tropical disturbance, or monsoon depression

During February 1, an area of low pressure was identified within a trough of low pressure, about 620 km (385 mi) to the northwest of Pago Pago in American Samoa. During that day, the system moved south-westwards and started to consolidate, before the Fiji Meteorological Service (FMS) classified the system as Tropical Depression 07F. At this stage, the depression was poorly organised with atmospheric convection displaced to the north of the systems low level circulation center, while it was located to the south of a ridge of high pressure in an area of moderate vertical wind shear. Over the next day, the system's organisation significantly improved with the development of a small central dense overcast, while its outflow was enhanced by a cross-equatorial wind flow. During February 3, the systems low level circulation center gradually slipped underneath the central dense overcast, before the FMS reported that the system had become a Category 1 tropical cyclone on the Australian scale and named it Meena. At this stage, the system was located about 160 km (100 mi) to the east of Pago Pago, American Samoa.

== Effects ==
Meena was the first of four severe tropical cyclones to impact the Cook Islands during the 2004–05 season.

=== Samoan Islands ===
Meena passed within 160 km (100 mi) of American Samoa's Manu'a group of islands, where wind gusts of up to 90 km/h (55 mph) were experienced. Authorities in the territory closed public schools and advised residents to prepare for heavy showers and possible flooding due to the cyclone. Flights to Manu'a islands were cancelled while delays occurred on flights between Samoa and American Samoa. Meena subsequently generated swells of between 5–7 feet (1.5–2.1 m) which produced surf heights of 10–14 feet (3.0–4.3 m) along Tutuila and Manu'a.

=== Cook Islands ===
During February 2, the FMS issued strong wind warnings and a tropical cyclone alert for both the Northern and the Southern Cook Islands, as it was thought that the system could produce gale-force winds over the islands within 24 - 48 hours. As a result of the alert being issued, the emergency operations centre was opened, while people were urged to move off the beach to higher ground. During the following day, gale warnings were issued for Suwarrow in the Northern Cooks and for Palmerston in the Southern Cooks.

== See also ==
- Cyclone Val – Impacted the Cook Islands during 1991
- Cyclone Martin – Impacted the Cook Islands during 1997
