= Cyclone Tusi =

Tropical cyclone of 1987

Severe Tropical Cyclone Tusi
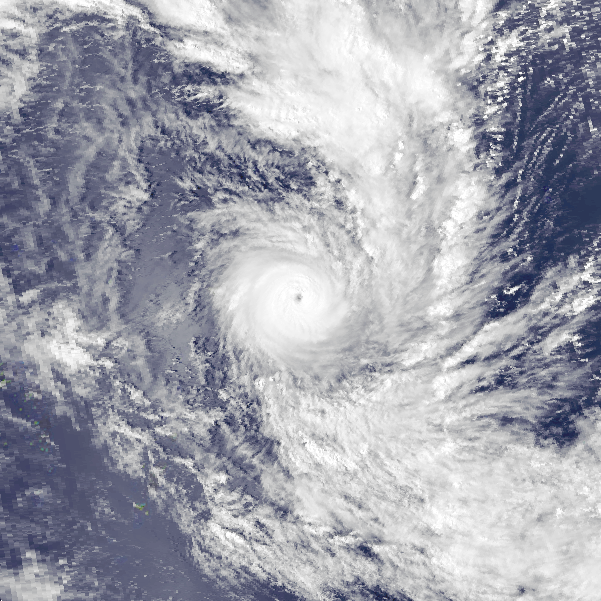
- Cyclone Tusi on January 18, 1987

Meteorological history
- Formed: January 13, 1987
- Extratropical: January 21, 1987
- Dissipated: January 25, 1987

Category 3 severe tropical cyclone
- 10-minute sustained (MetService)
- Highest winds: 150 km/h (90 mph)
- Lowest pressure: 955 hPa (mbar); 28.20 inHg

Category 3-equivalent tropical cyclone
- 1-minute sustained (SSHWS/JTWC)
- Highest winds: 185 km/h (115 mph)

Overall effects
- Fatalities: None reported
- Damage: $80 million (1987 USD)
- Areas affected: Tuvalu, Samoa, American Samoa, Cook Islands
- IBTrACS
- Part of the 1986–87 South Pacific cyclone season

Severe Tropical Cyclone Tusi was a tropical cyclone which affected the island nations of Tuvalu, Tokelau, Western Samoa, American Samoa, Niue and the Southern Cook Islands during January 1987. The precursor tropical depression to Cyclone Tusi developed on January 13, within a trough of low pressure near the island nation of Tuvalu. Over the next few days the system gradually developed further before it was named Tusi during January 16, after it had become equivalent to a modern-day category 1 tropical cyclone on the Australian tropical cyclone intensity scale. After being named the system gradually intensified as it moved southeastwards along the trough, between the islands of Fakaofo and Swains during January 17. Tusi's eye subsequently passed near or over American Samoa's Manu'a Islands early the next day, as the system peaked in intensity with 10-minute sustained wind speeds of 150 km/h (90 mph). The system subsequently posed a threat to the Southern Cook Islands, however this threat gradually diminished as Tusi moved southwards and approached 25S during January 20.

== Meteorological history ==
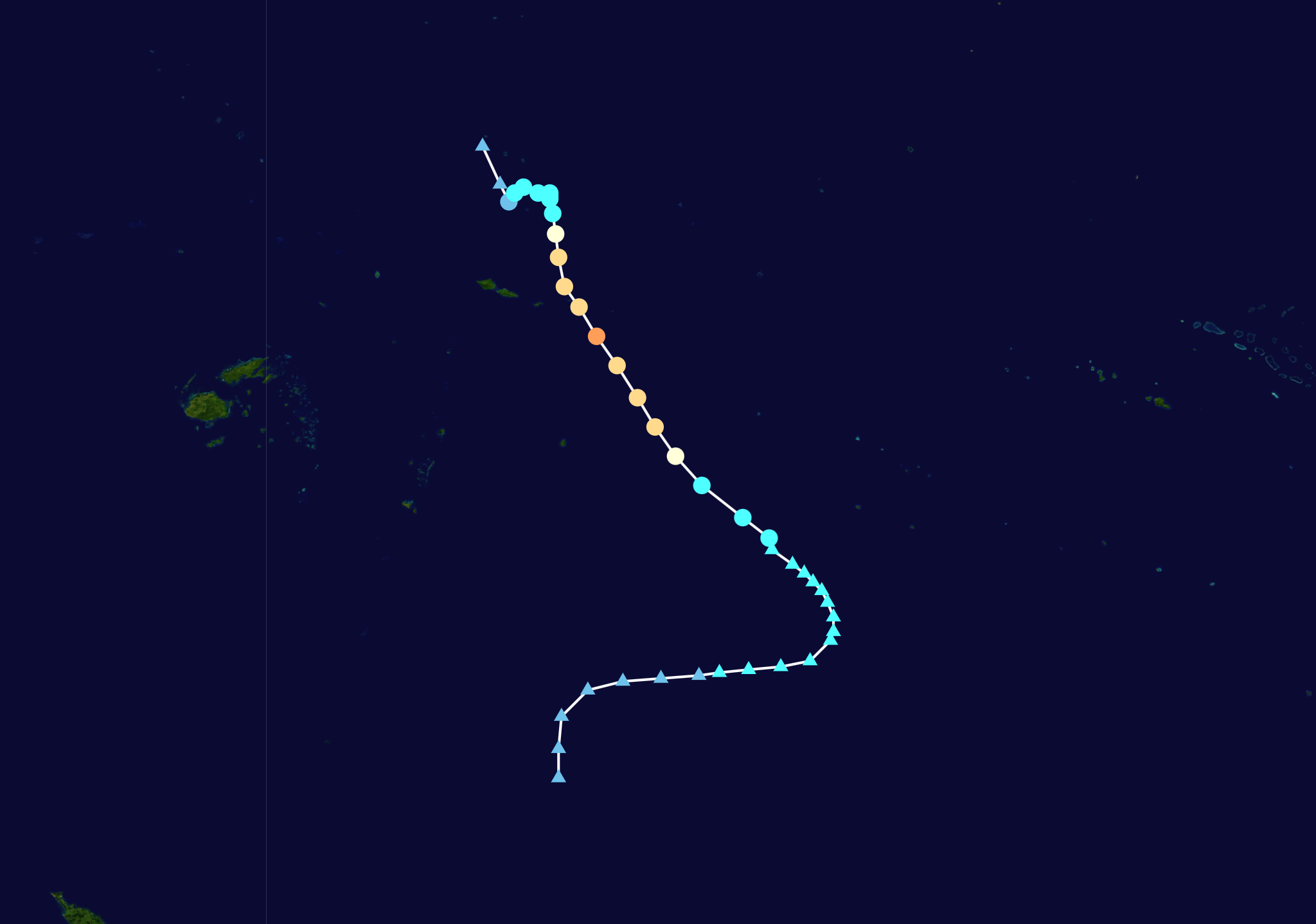
Map plotting the storm's track and intensity, according to the Saffir–Simpson scale Map key Saffir–Simpson scale Tropical depression (≤38 mph, ≤62 km/h) Tropical storm (39–73 mph, 63–118 km/h) Category 1 (74–95 mph, 119–153 km/h) Category 2 (96–110 mph, 154–177 km/h) Category 3 (111–129 mph, 178–208 km/h) Category 4 (130–156 mph, 209–251 km/h) Category 5 (≥157 mph, ≥252 km/h) Unknown Storm type Tropical cyclone Subtropical cyclone Extratropical cyclone, remnant low, tropical disturbance, or monsoon depression

During the middle of January 1987, a trough of low pressure was located over the South Pacific Ocean, between Tuvalu and the Southern Cook Islands. During January 13, a small tropical depression, developed within the trough of low pressure near the island nation of Tuvalu. Over the next few days the system gradually developed further, as it moved south-eastwards towards Tokelau. The FMS subsequently named the system Tusi early on January 16, after reports of storm-force winds up to 95 km/h (60 mph) had been received from Tokelau and the system had developed into a modern-day category one tropical cyclone on the Australian tropical cyclone intensity scale. Later that day the Naval Western Oceanography Center (NWOC) initiated advisories on the system and designated it as Tropical Cyclone 08P. After being named the system gradually intensified as it moved southeastwards along the trough, between Tokelau's Fakaofo and Swains islands and passed about 95 km (60 mi) to the east of Swains island during January 17. During that day Tusi started to move southwards as it intensified further and developed an eye, before it became a category 3 severe tropical cyclone with hurricane-force winds.

Tusi's eye subsequently passed near or over American Samoa's Manu'a Islands early the next day, as the system peaked in intensity with the FMS estimating 10-minute sustained wind speeds of 150 km/h (90 mph). Later that day the NWOC estimated that Tusi had peaked with 1-minute sustained wind speeds of 185 km/h (115 mph), which made it a category 3 on the Saffir-Simpson hurricane wind scale. By this time the system had started moving towards the south-southeast and posed a threat to the Southern Cook Islands. During January 18, the system started to weaken as its outflow became unidirectional, before it started to move southwards again during January 20. As a result, the threat to the Southern Cook Islands gradually diminished and no gale-force winds were observed in the Cook Islands. The system subsequently moved below 25S and transitioned into an extra-tropical depression during the next day. An area of high pressure to the southeast of the system subsequently steered Tusi's remnants westwards, before they were last noted to the northeast of New Zealand on January 25.

== Preparations and impact ==
While it was active Cyclone Tusi affected the island nations of Tuvalu, Tokelau, Western Samoa, American Samoa, Niue and the Southern Cook Islands. As the initial tropical cyclone developed, westerly winds were responsible for some coastal erosion at several places on the Tuvaluan island of Funafuti. Tusi severely affected the island nation of Tokelau during its development phase with storm force winds reported, however, it was thought that these winds had been overestimated. Breadfruit and banana crops were blown down on the atoll of Nukunonu.

Early on January 16, a tropical cyclone alert was issued for the Samoan Islands, which indicated that gale force or stronger winds could develop over the islands during the next day. During the next day a hurricane warning was issued for American Samoa, during the next day after Tusi had started to move southwards. Tusi's eye subsequently passed near or over American Samoa's Manu'a Islands with American, Australian and Fijian Media reporting that hurricane-force winds, of 117 km/h (73 mph) and 177 km/h (110 mph) had been observed over the islands. However, the accuracy of these reports was unknown as there were no weather stations on the islands, while there were no gale, storm or hurricane-force winds observed at Pago Pago on the main island of Tutuila. Due to the system a rainfall total of 81 mm (3.17 in) was observed in Afono. Extensive damage was recorded on the Manu'a islands of Ofu-Olosega and Taʻu, with damage to crops, housing and agriculture estimated at over US$80 million. Around 2000 people were left homeless after 95% of the 300 houses in the group were destroyed, while it was estimated that between 50% and 100% of all buildings on each island were damaged. The electric generator on Tau was knocked out during the storm, which left the island's water pumps unable to function and islanders relying on coconuts for water. The system hurled furniture and appliances through walls and flattened plantations that grew various crops including bananas, oranges, taro and breadfruit.

During the systems aftermath a medical team from the Lyndon B. Johnson Medical Center and emergency supplies including tents were airlifted to the islands from Pago Pago, while 37 people who were seriously injured were flown to Pago Pago for treatment. Residents of Pago Pago donated money, clothing and food while the government sent fresh drinking water and other supplies to the islanders by boat. Teams of officials were also sent to deal with problems involving electrical power, agriculture, roads and schooling. Territorial authorities in American Samoa asked the United States Department of the Interior, to get the United States President: Ronald Reagan to declare the Manua Islands a disaster area. The Department of the Interior subsequently informed the Federal Emergency Management Agency and the American Red Cross of the damage in the territory. Ronald Reagan signed a Major Disaster Declaration for American Samoa during January 24, which authorized the use of federal funds in relief and recovery efforts. The American Red Cross chapters in Honolulu and San Francisco were asked to airlift relief supplies to the islands, while the United States Department of Defense was asked to mobilize its Army Reserve unit in Pago Pago. Other relief efforts included the New Zealand Government sending a cheque to the American Samoa Governor for $10 000.

During January 18, tropical cyclone alerts were issued for both Niue and the Southern Cook Islands, as it was feared that gale force winds could develop over either of the island nations later that day. However, the alert for Niue was cancelled later that day, after it had become clear that gale-force winds would no longer develop over the island. During the next day the alert was cancelled for most of the Cook Islands after the threat had diminished, however a gale warning was subsequently issued for the islands of Rarotonga and Mangaia. However, no gale-force winds were observed on any of the Southern Cook Islands, as Tusi became the second tropical cyclone in a fortnight to affect the island nation.

== See also ==
- Cyclone Martin
