= List of storms named Martin =

The name Martin has been used for four tropical cyclones worldwide: For one storm in the Atlantic Ocean, two in the South Pacific Ocean and for one extratropical European windstorm.

== Atlantic ==
The name Martin has been used one time since 2016, when it replaced the name Matthew on the list of tropical system naming list in 2016.

- Hurricane Martin (2022) – short-lived but very large Category 1 hurricane that churned in the open North Atlantic

== South Pacific ==
- Cyclone Martin (1986) – weak tropical cyclone had only minor effects on land
- Cyclone Martin (1997) – damaging and deadly Category 3 tropical cyclone that affected the Cook Islands and French Polynesia

The WMO retired the name Martin from use in the South Pacific basin following the 1997–98 cyclone season

== Europe ==
- Cyclone Martin (1999) – caused devastating damage in southern France in late December 1999, killing 30 people

== See also ==
- List of storms named Marty
