= Cyclone Ula =

Tropical cyclone

Severe Tropical Cyclone Ula
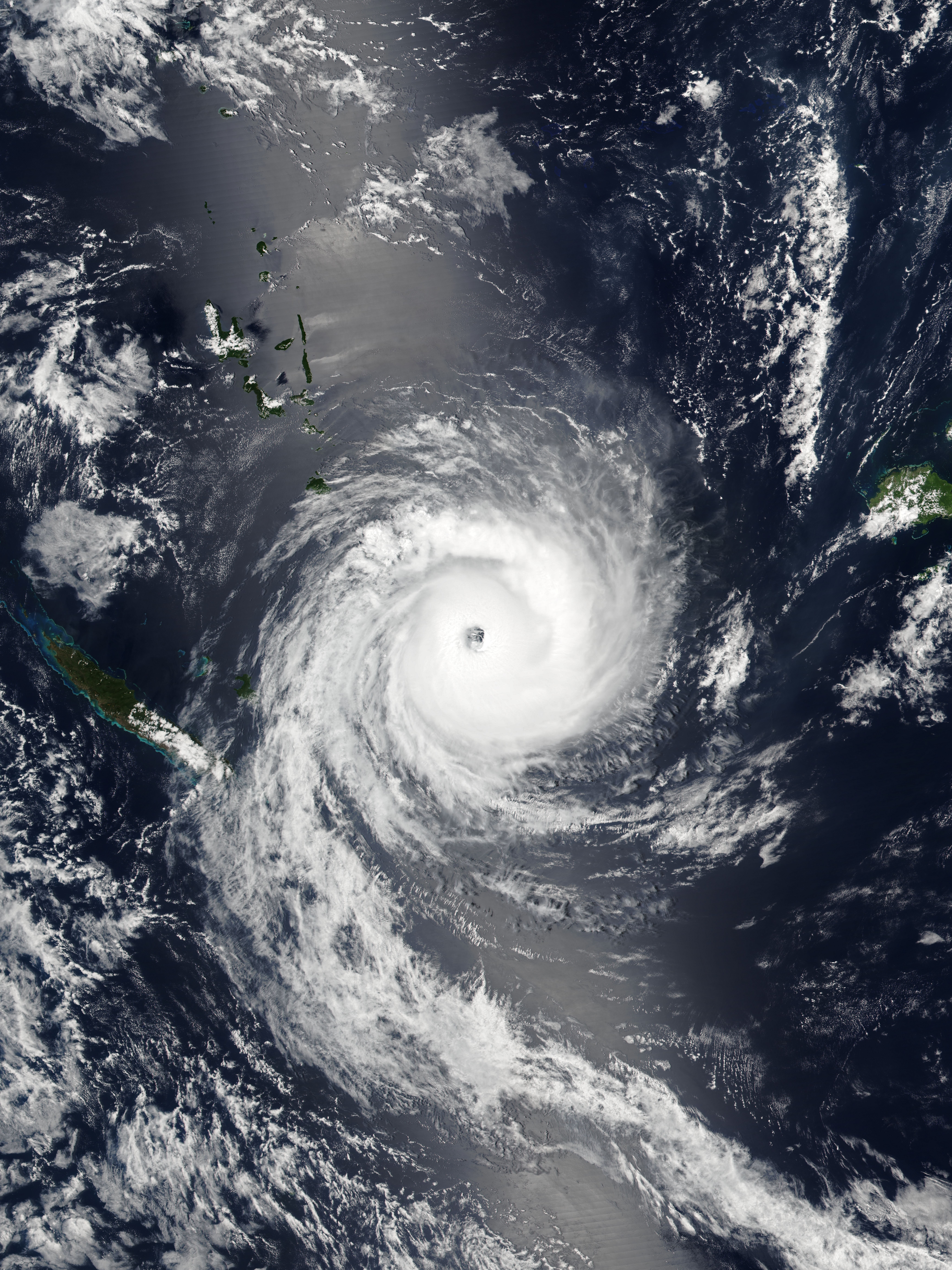
- Ula at peak intensity southeast of Vanuatu on January 10

Meteorological history
- Formed: December 26, 2015
- Extratropical: January 12, 2016
- Dissipated: January 16, 2016

Category 4 severe tropical cyclone
- 10-minute sustained (FMS)
- Highest winds: 185 km/h (115 mph)
- Lowest pressure: 944 hPa (mbar); 27.88 inHg

Category 4-equivalent tropical cyclone
- 1-minute sustained (SSHWS/JTWC)
- Highest winds: 220 km/h (140 mph)
- Lowest pressure: 933 hPa (mbar); 27.55 inHg

Overall effects
- Missing: 1 (presumed dead)
- Damage: Minimal
- Areas affected: Tuvalu; American Samoa; Tonga; Fiji; Vanuatu; New Caledonia
- IBTrACS
- Part of the 2015–16 South Pacific cyclone season

Severe Tropical Cyclone Ula was a powerful and long-lived tropical cyclone during late December 2015 and mid-January 2016. It originated from a tropical disturbance on December 26, 2015, east of the Solomon Islands. Moving generally east, development was initially slow and the system finally reached cyclone strength—having gale-force winds—on December 30. The newly christened Tropical Cyclone Ula turned sharply south and rapidly intensified, attaining hurricane strength the following day. A shift to the southwest brought the system close to the northern islands of Tonga on January 2, 2016. It subsequently brushed several islands in the Lau Group of Fiji before weakening. Nearly degrading to a tropical depression, Ula turned to the northwest and regained strength. After turning back to the southwest, it achieved its peak intensity as a Category 4 on the Australian scale with winds of 185 km/h (115 mph) on January 10. Thereafter, the storm bypassed Vanuatu to the southeast and New Caledonia to the east as it accelerated southward.

Throughout its existence, Ula affected several nations but its effects were largely limited, with only localized areas reporting damage. Dozens of structures were damaged or destroyed in Tuvalu while crops in Tonga, Fiji, and Vanuatu were impacted. No fatalities have been attributed to the storm, though one person was swept out to sea in American Samoa and was not found. Residents across the Lau Islands of Fiji required food security due to crop losses.

== Meteorological history ==
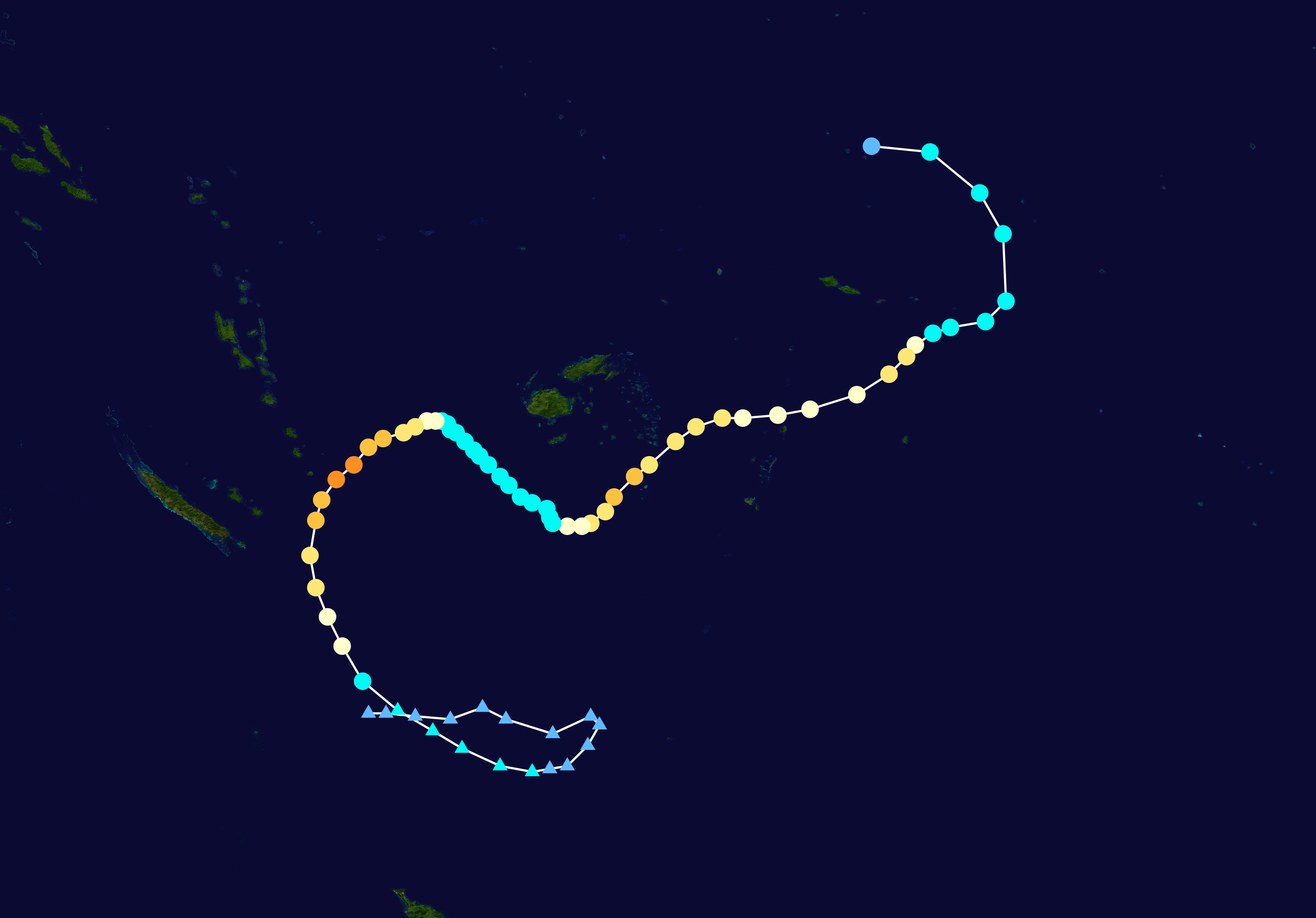
Map plotting the storm's track and intensity, according to the Saffir–Simpson scale Map key Saffir–Simpson scale Tropical depression (≤38 mph, ≤62 km/h) Tropical storm (39–73 mph, 63–118 km/h) Category 1 (74–95 mph, 119–153 km/h) Category 2 (96–110 mph, 154–177 km/h) Category 3 (111–129 mph, 178–208 km/h) Category 4 (130–156 mph, 209–251 km/h) Category 5 (≥157 mph, ≥252 km/h) Unknown Storm type Tropical cyclone Subtropical cyclone Extratropical cyclone, remnant low, tropical disturbance, or monsoon depression

In late December 2015, a long-lived and powerful westerly wind burst triggered the formation of a tropical disturbance in the south Pacific, along with its twin in the central North Pacific, which became Tropical Depression Nine-C. On December 26, 2015, Fiji Meteorological Service (FMS) began monitoring the poorly-organized tropical disturbance, dubbed 05F, to the east of the Solomon Islands. Tracking east, the system struggled to develop within a highly sheared environment. By December 29, the system was centered roughly 230 km (145 mi) northeast of Pago Pago, American Samoa, and had developed a low-level circulation accompanied by persistent convection. Development hastened throughout the day, with banding features forming and upper-level outflow becoming established over the system. The system soon acquired gale-force and the FMS upgraded the system to a tropical depression at 21:00 UTC.

Ula moved to the south and eventually west as the system intensified. By January 2, Ula had attained hurricane strength as the storm was upgraded into a Category 2 Tropical Cyclone. Ula has subsequently attained a preliminary peak intensity at Category 3 tropical cyclone status, equivalent to Category 2 hurricane status. Ula weakened afterwards, only to re-intensify to category 3 status again the next day. By January 7, however, Ula turned northwest, slowed and dropped to tropical cyclone status. With the unfavorable conditions, Ula remained at that status for three days. On January 10, Ula rapidly re-intensified to a peak intensity of 115 mph (ten-minute sustained) or 140 mph (one-minute sustained) winds. This constituted as peak intensity and Ula was upgraded to category 4 severe tropical cyclone status, and the Joint Typhoon Warning Center upgraded Ula to a category 4 cyclone. Ula kept category 4 status for 24 hours before an abrupt weakening to a tropical depression. By 12:00 UTC on January 12, Ula transitioned into an extratropical cyclone.

== Preparations and impact ==
=== Tuvalu and American Samoa ===
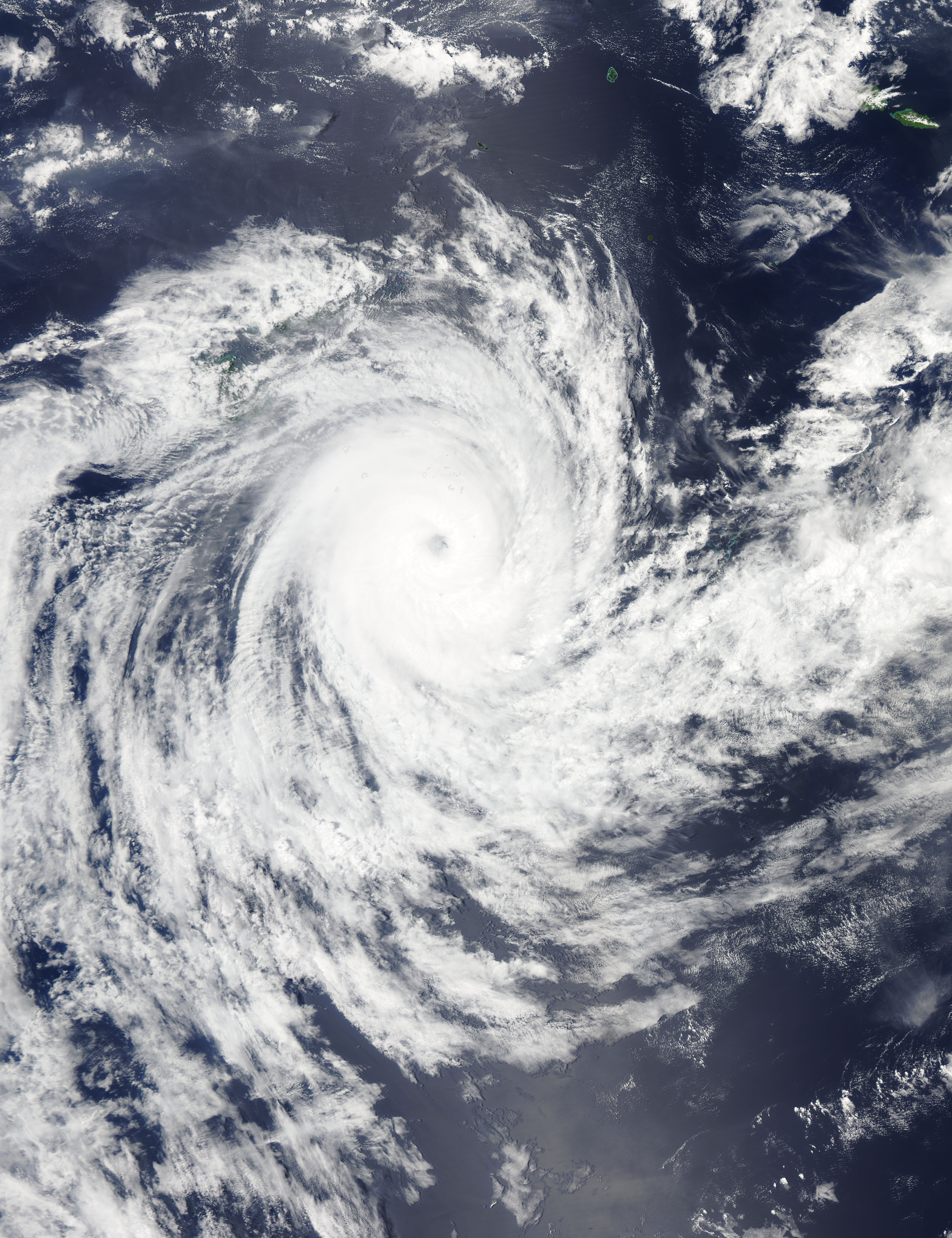
Cyclone Ula near Fiji's Lau Islands on January 3

Early in the storm's existence, Ula produced winds up to 100 km/h (62 mph) across Tuvalu, uprooting trees and leaving 40 homes and 10 businesses damaged, some beyond repair Thirty families required evacuation. Waves of 3 to 4 m (9.8 to 13.1 ft) also battered the islands, whose highest elevation is only 4.6 m (15 ft). A fisherman went missing in Faleasao, American Samoa, after being swept out to sea by large swells. After 72 hours, fruitless search efforts were called off.

=== Tonga ===
On January 1, Tongan Prime Minister ʻAkilisi Pōhiva preemptively declared a state of emergency for the Vavaʻu and Haʻapai islands. Eleven shelters were opened, with 390 seeking refuge in them. Flights across the nation were suspended for the duration of the storm. Strong winds up to 150 km/h (93 mph) downed trees, power lines, and tore roofs from homes, with Vava'u suffering the brunt of the damage. Overall damage was limited, however, and the previously issued state of emergency was lifted on January 6.

=== Fiji ===
After brushing Tonga, Fiji's Lau Islands were in the path of Ula. Officials across the small islands advised residents to move to higher ground and seek shelter in sturdy buildings. Boat services across the Yasawa Islands were temporarily suspended. Though the cyclone passed close to a few islands, damage was relatively limited. Corrugated iron roofs were blown off some structures on Ono-i-Lau and Kabara. Two homes were destroyed on Vatoa. Power and water supplies were temporarily disrupted. Crops also sustained significant damage, with 50 percent lost across the Lau Islands, prompting the Fijian Government to provide a month's-worth of food rations to residents across 13 villages. General relief supplies, including disaster kits, medicine, and water purifying tablets, were also distributed to Ono-i-Lau, Ogea, Fulaga and Kabara. The cyclone's outer bands caused flooding in northern provinces, including Ba. Rainfall was largely beneficial to the nation, particularly for the Western Division, which was in the midst of a drought.

=== Vanuatu and New Caledonia ===
Vanuatu's southernmost province of Tafea was placed on alert in advance of Ula's approach. The province was devastated by Cyclone Pam in March 2015, but reported to be prepared to endure another storm. Residents were urged to evacuate and fishermen were advised to return to port. The storm ultimately remained far enough away to cause only limited damage, primarily to agriculture on Aneityum and Futuna islands. Alerts were temporarily raised for Maré Island, New Caledonia; Ula eventually passed harmlessly to the east of the island.

== See also ==
- 2015–16 South Pacific cyclone season
- Cyclone Wilma
