= Cyclone Wilma =

2011 South Pacific cyclone

Severe Tropical Cyclone Wilma
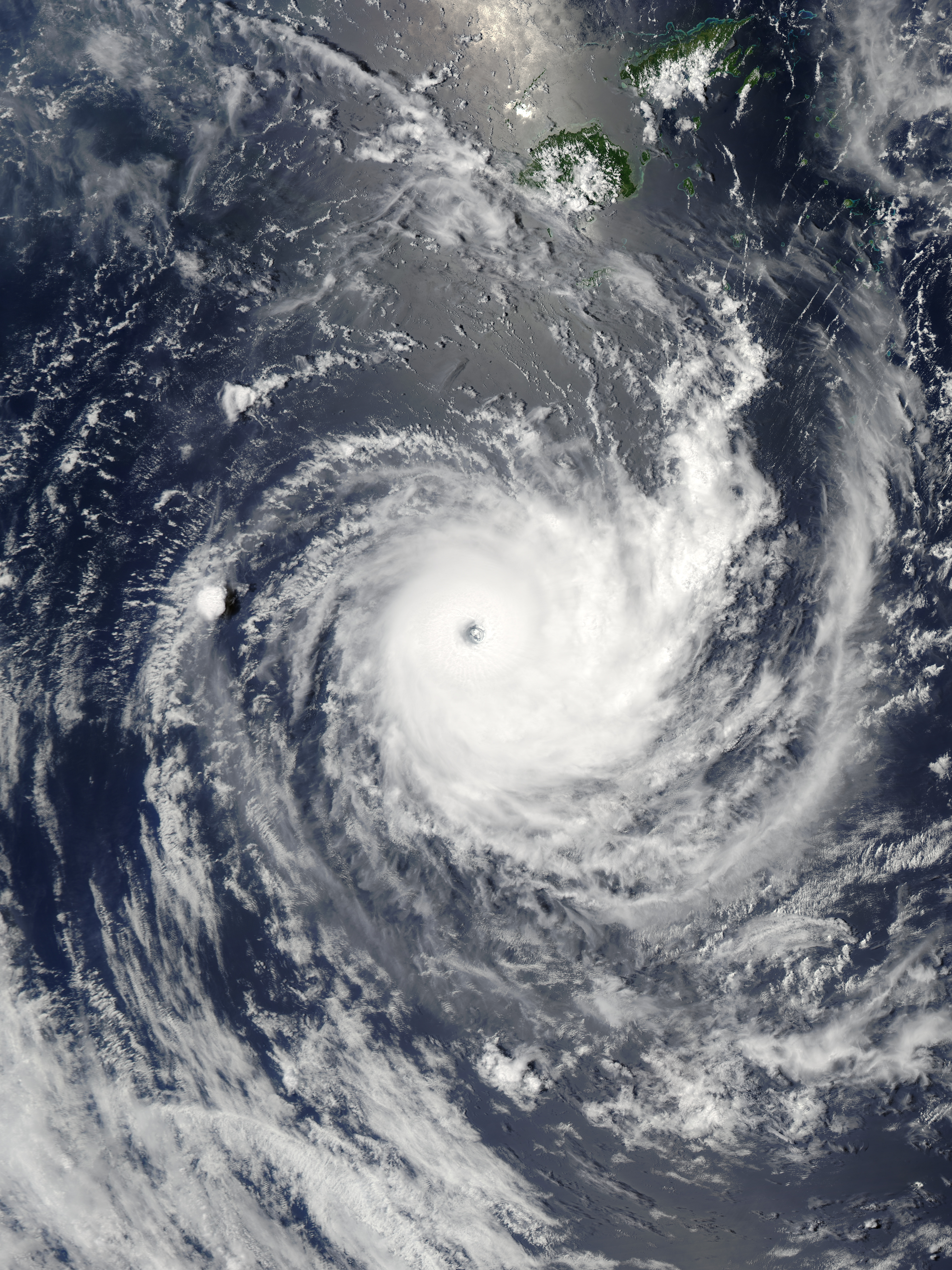
- Wilma prior to peak strength on January 26

Meteorological history
- Formed: 19 January 2011
- Extratropical: 29 January 2011
- Dissipated: 30 January 2011

Category 4 severe tropical cyclone
- 10-minute sustained (FMS)
- Highest winds: 185 km/h (115 mph)
- Lowest pressure: 939 hPa (mbar); 27.73 inHg

Category 4-equivalent tropical cyclone
- 1-minute sustained (SSHWS/JTWC)
- Highest winds: 215 km/h (130 mph)
- Lowest pressure: 937 hPa (mbar); 27.67 inHg

Overall effects
- Fatalities: 3 direct
- Damage: $22 million (2011 USD)
- Areas affected: Samoan Islands, Tonga, New Zealand
- IBTrACS
- Part of the 2010–11 South Pacific cyclone season

Severe Tropical Cyclone Wilma was a powerful tropical cyclone that affected the Samoan Islands, Tonga and New Zealand. Forming out of a trough of low pressure on 19 January 2011 to the northwest of Fiji, Cyclone Wilma initially tracked eastward towards the Samoan Islands. On 22 January, the system took a sharp southward turn, bringing its centre directly over American Samoa the following day. After turning towards the southwest and accelerating, Wilma steadily intensified into a severe tropical cyclone before striking Tonga. The storm reached its peak intensity on 26 January as a Category 4 cyclone with winds of 185 km/h (115 mph) and a barometric pressure of 930 mbar (hPa; 27.46 inHg). Gradually re-curving towards the southeast, Wilma weakened quickly as it moved over cooler sea surface temperatures; by 28 January, it was downgraded to a tropical cyclone. Later that day, the storm brushed the North Island of New Zealand before transitioning into an extratropical cyclone.

Throughout Wilma's path, three countries were affected, with New Zealand experiencing the most severe damage. At least three fatalities in American Samoa have been blamed on the storm, two from flooding and one from high seas. In Tonga, "major damage" was reported across the Ha'apai Islands. In New Zealand, several homes were destroyed by the storm and hundreds of people were evacuated. However, there were no reports of fatalities. Torrential rain in the country, exceeding 280 mm (11 in) in some places, triggered 50-year flood events and isolated towns.

== Meteorological history ==
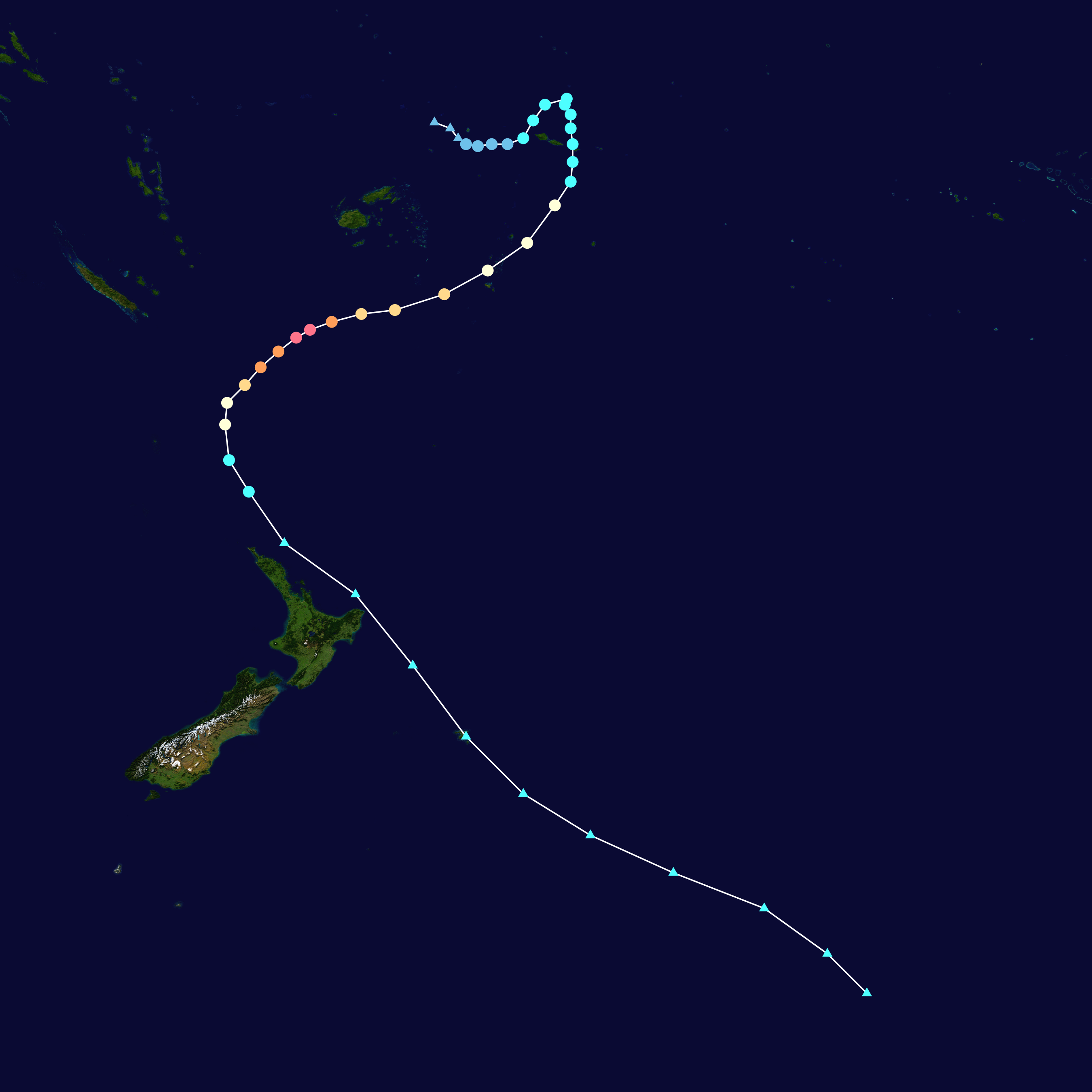
Map plotting the storm's track and intensity, according to the Saffir–Simpson scale Map key Saffir–Simpson scale Tropical depression (≤38 mph, ≤62 km/h) Tropical storm (39–73 mph, 63–118 km/h) Category 1 (74–95 mph, 119–153 km/h) Category 2 (96–110 mph, 154–177 km/h) Category 3 (111–129 mph, 178–208 km/h) Category 4 (130–156 mph, 209–251 km/h) Category 5 (≥157 mph, ≥252 km/h) Unknown Storm type Tropical cyclone Subtropical cyclone Extratropical cyclone, remnant low, tropical disturbance, or monsoon depression

Early on 19 January, RSMC Nadi reported that Tropical Disturbance 06F had developed along a trough of low pressure about 665 km (413 mi) to the northeast of Nadi, Fiji. During that day convection surrounding the disturbance gradually became more organised, and early the next day, RSMC Nadi reported that it had intensified into a tropical depression. On 22 January, The Joint Typhoon Warning Center (JTWC) started monitoring the system as Tropical Cyclone '08P'. Later the same day, RSMC Nadi upgraded Tropical Depression 06F to a tropical cyclone and named it 'Wilma'. Early on 24 January, RSMC Nadi further upgraded Wilma to a Category 2 Tropical Cyclone, and then Category 3 later that day. Wilma continued to strengthen and on 26 January, the RSMC Nadi upgraded it into a Category 4 Severe Tropical Cyclone. Early on 27 January, Wilma entered TCWC Wellington's area of responsibility. A few hours later, TCWC Wellington took full responsibility of Wilma, and downgraded it into a Category 3 Severe Tropical Cyclone. The next day, Wilma continued to weaken and TCWC Wellington further downgraded it into a tropical cyclone. Later that day, the JTWC, issuing their final warning, reported that the system took a southeast curve along the coast of North Island, New Zealand and started becoming extratropical. A few hours later, the TCWC Wellington discontinued advisories, no longer considering it a tropical cyclone.

== Preparations, Impact and aftermath ==
=== American Samoa ===
Following harsh criticism for the lack of a warning siren after the 2009 Samoa earthquake and tsunami, in which more than 100 perished, the American Samoan Government ensured that residents were aware of Cyclone Wilma several days prior to its arrival. Many people boarded up their homes and Homeland Security was on standby in case of evacuations. As a precautionary measure, ten shelters were also opened on the island.

On 23 January, Wilma passed directly over American Samoa, bringing winds in excess of 95 km/h (60 mph). The local National Weather Service office recorded sustained winds of 66 km/h (41 mph) with gusts to 95 km/h (59 mph) while the National Oceanic and Atmospheric Administration's Earth System Research Laboratories on Cape Matatula, Tutuila, observed sustained winds of 93 km/h (58 mph) and gusts of 130 km/h (81 mph). These winds downed numerous trees and power lines, leaving several towns and cities without electricity. Several structures also had their roofs blown off. Heavy rains amounting to 243 mm (9.56 in) triggered a few landslides but overall damage was light. With that, the Pago Pago International Airport was closed and the American Samoa Governor, Togiola Tulafono ordered local government agencies to help those in need. Wilma caused severe damage to the StarKist Samoa tuna cannery which was then shut down for a week. Across the region, three fatalities due to drowning were blamed on the storm. One of these was a child who was swept away by a swollen river while he was playing near it.

In the days after Wilma's passage, health officials warned residents to stay away from standing water as it may have been contaminated to prevent the spread of water-borne diseases. Following preliminary assessments of damage, Governor Tulafono stated that there was sufficient losses to warrant an emergency declaration from President Barack Obama. However, he also requested that a second, in-depth report of the situation be made to better determine how to move forward; the second assessment was set to start on 27 January. According to the Federal Emergency Management Agency, power and water supplies were restored to all areas by 25 January and the airport was set to reopen that day. Harbours were to remain closed for several more days as debris was being cleared from coastal waters.

=== Tonga and Lau Islands ===
After Wilma moved over American Samoa, a tropical cyclone alert was issued in Tonga and Lau Islands. On the morning of 25 January, Wilma blew over Tonga as a severe tropical cyclone. Major damage was reported in the Ha'apai Islands of Tonga. Wilma also disrupted New Zealand Foreign Minister, Murray McCully's trip to Tonga. Throughout Tonga, damage amounted to $3 million.

=== New Zealand ===
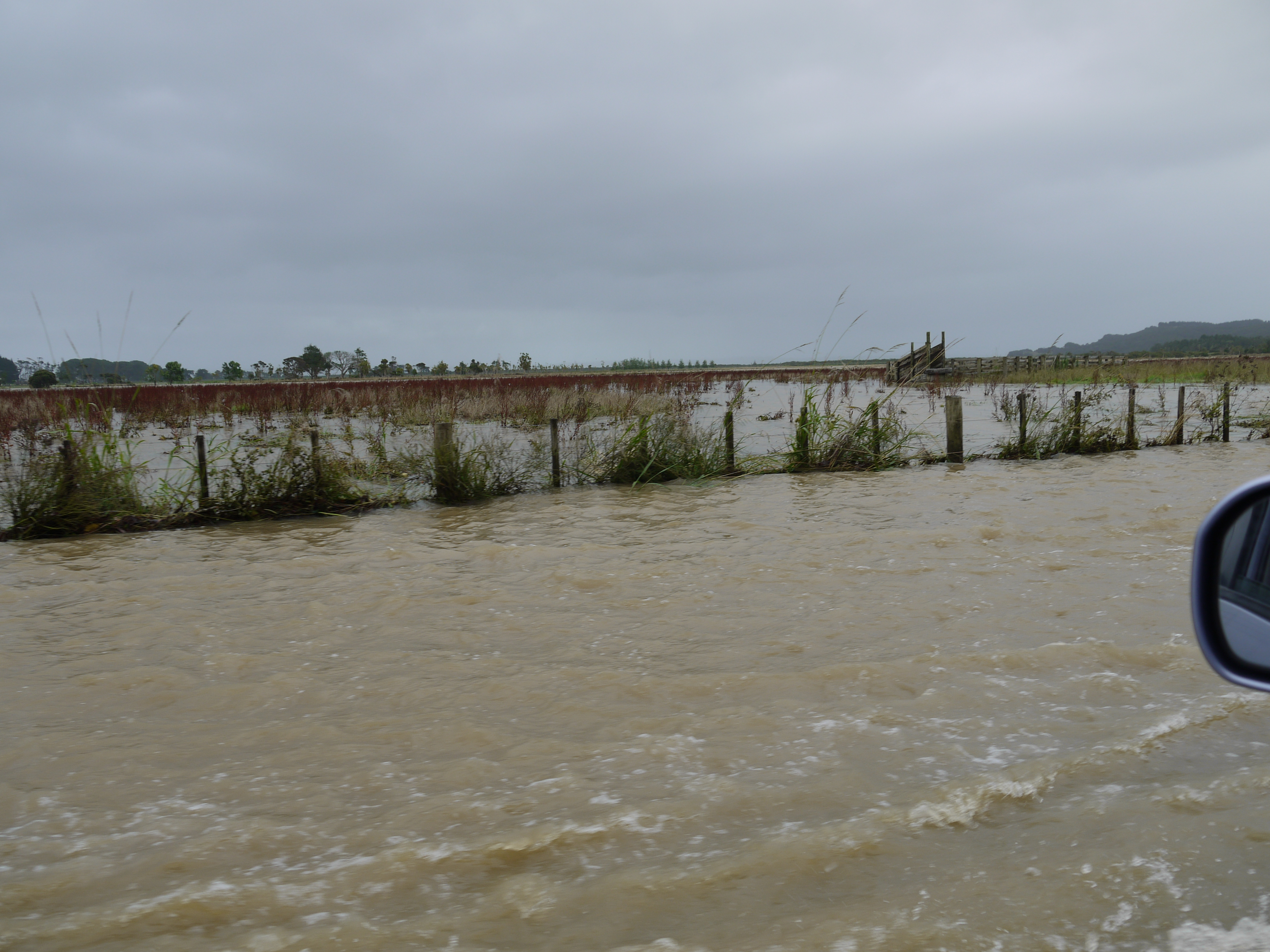
Flooding in Kaukapakapa after Cyclone Wilma

According to the media, Wilma was expected to approach the coasts of Cape Reinga on 29 January, as a Category 2 Tropical Cyclone. In combination with previous flooding expected to be worsened by Wilma, officials in New Zealand evacuated numerous towns in the Thames-Coromandel District. At least 70 people sought refuge in public shelters during the storm.

As Cyclone Wilma brushed the North Island, it brought torrential rains to much of the region, with several areas recording 200 mm (7.9 in) during a 24‑hour span. One station recorded 280 mm (11 in) in 12–14 hours. With this, several areas neared record-breaking rainfall totals for the month of January. These rains, in combination with heavy rains a week prior, caused several rivers to swell. One river, the Whakatāne, was expected to reach levels seen in 50-year flood events. Large amounts of debris was reported to be flowing down rivers into the ocean. High winds accompanying these rains caused significant damage as well; several homes were destroyed and electricity was cut off to many towns and cities as power lines were felled. Numerous roads across the island were shut down due to treacherous conditions. Two rural towns, Waimana and Ruatoki Valley, were isolated by flooding as high water covered all roads leading to and from the areas. In parts of the Coromandel Peninsula, sewage treatment plants were overwhelmed by the amount of rain and began spilling raw sewage into nearby communities as well as Whangamata harbour. Along the slopes of Mount Maunganui, campers were forced to evacuate in the middle of the night as flood waters began to threaten their rest areas. Several landslides were also reported during the passage of Wilma, cutting off roads and damaging homes. On Waiheke Island, two residents managed to escape their cottage, after the family dog began barking outside, before the hill it was situated on gave way, destroying their house.

Throughout New Zealand, damage from Wilma was at least NZ$25 million (US$19 million). While other cyclones have weakened and turned into extratropical storms that then hit New Zealand, Cyclone Wilma is the first known to hit New Zealand as a tropical cyclone.

=== Retirement ===
The name Wilma was retired in 2012 and was replaced with Wano.

== See also ==
- 2010–11 South Pacific cyclone season
- Cyclone Ula
