= Cyclone Hina =

Category 3 South Pacific severe tropical cyclone in 1997

Severe Tropical Cyclone Hina
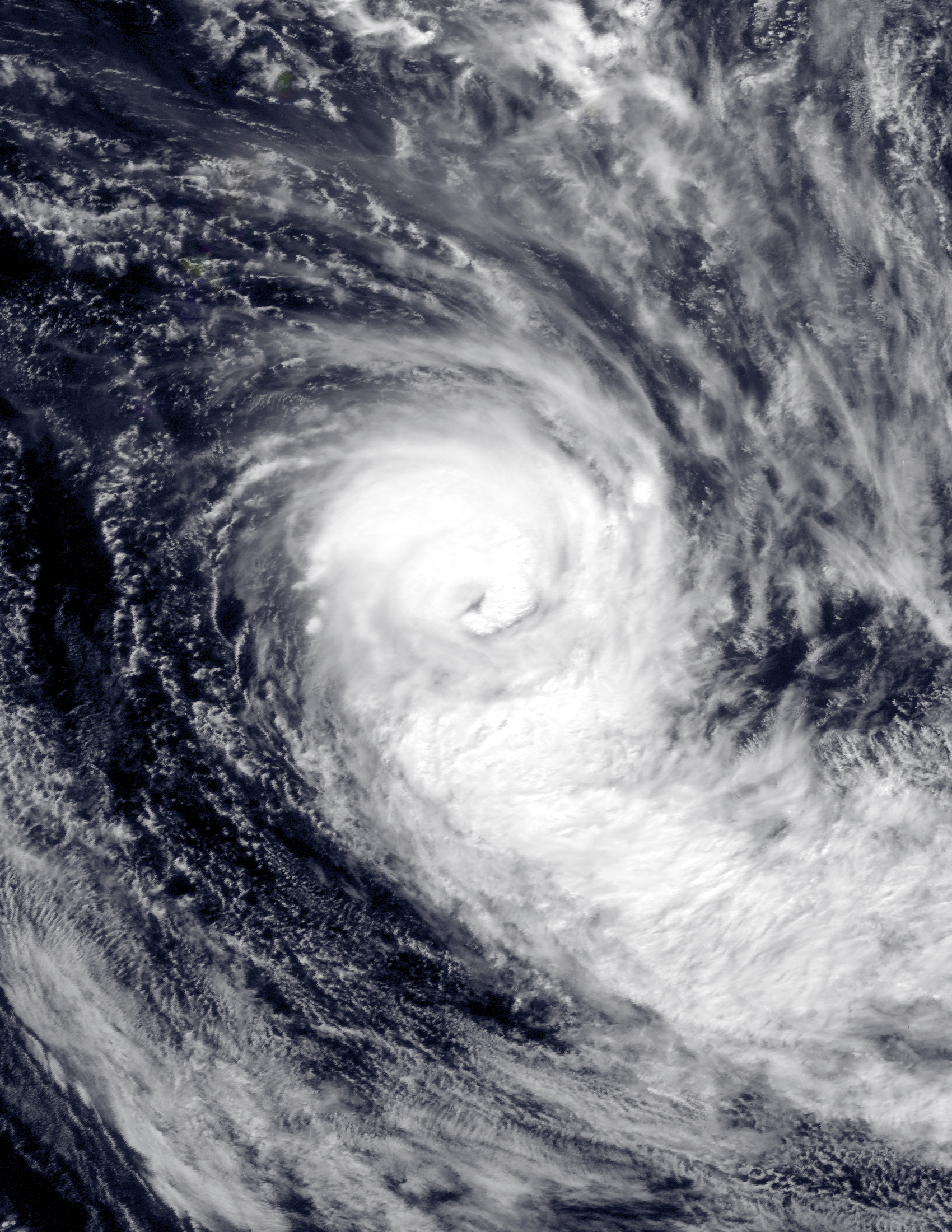
- Hina at peak intensity on March 17

Meteorological history
- Formed: March 11, 1997
- Extratropical: March 19, 1997
- Dissipated: March 21, 1997

Category 3 severe tropical cyclone
- 10-minute sustained (FMS)
- Highest winds: 120 km/h (75 mph)
- Lowest pressure: 970 hPa (mbar); 28.64 inHg

Category 1-equivalent tropical cyclone
- 1-minute sustained (SSHWS/NPMOC)
- Highest winds: 140 km/h (85 mph)

Overall effects
- Fatalities: 1 indirect
- Damage: $15.2 million (1997 USD)
- Areas affected: Tuvalu, Wallis and Futuna, Tonga
- IBTrACS
- Part of the 1996–97 South Pacific cyclone season

Severe Tropical Cyclone Hina in March 1997 was the worst tropical cyclone to affect the South Pacific island nation of Tonga since Cyclone Isaac in 1982. The system was first noted within the monsoon trough on March 11, 1997, as a weak shallow depression within the vicinity of Rotuma. Over the next two days, the depression remained near Rotuma with no preferred movement, as it started to develop further within favorable conditions for further development. The system was subsequently named Hina on March 15, after it had started to move eastwards and had passed to the southeast of Niulakita, Tuvalu. During that day the system moved south-eastwards and impacted Wallis and Futuna, before it passed over Tonga's southern islands of Tongatapu and 'Eua during March 16. After impacting Tonga the system moved rapidly towards the south-southeast and weakened below tropical cyclone intensity, before it was last noted on March 21 about 1,500 km (930 mi) to the south of the Pitcairn Islands. During the system's post-analysis, it was determined that the warning centers had underestimated Hina's intensity as it passed over Tonga, after damage in the island nation had been greater than expected.

Within Tuvalu, it was difficult to assess damage done by Hina alone, after Cyclone Gavin impacted the area a week earlier. Storm surge and strong winds from both cyclones caused a severe amount of coastal erosion on all of the country’s nine atolls, with about 6.7% of land washed into the sea. Hina caused no significant damage on Walls Island, while it caused some damage to crops and destroyed parts of the road on Futuna Island. In Tonga, there were no casualties reported while the system was affecting the island nation, however, Vaiola Hospital reported that they had treated a number of patients for injuries that were caused during the system's aftermath. One indirect death was also reported, after a person suffered a heart attack while evacuating from his home. The cyclone left extensive damage to utilities and agriculture on Tongatapu, where trees were uprooted and more than 12,000 tonnes (26,000,000 lb) of fruit and food crops were destroyed, mostly to banana and coconut trees. After the cyclone, the Tongan Government requested and received emergency aid from the governments of several countries including France, Australia, New Zealand, Japan and the United Kingdom. This was after the government had provided T$5 million (US$3.97 million), or about 5% of its national budget to facilitate the immediate start of emergency relief and repairs to essential services.

== Meteorological history ==
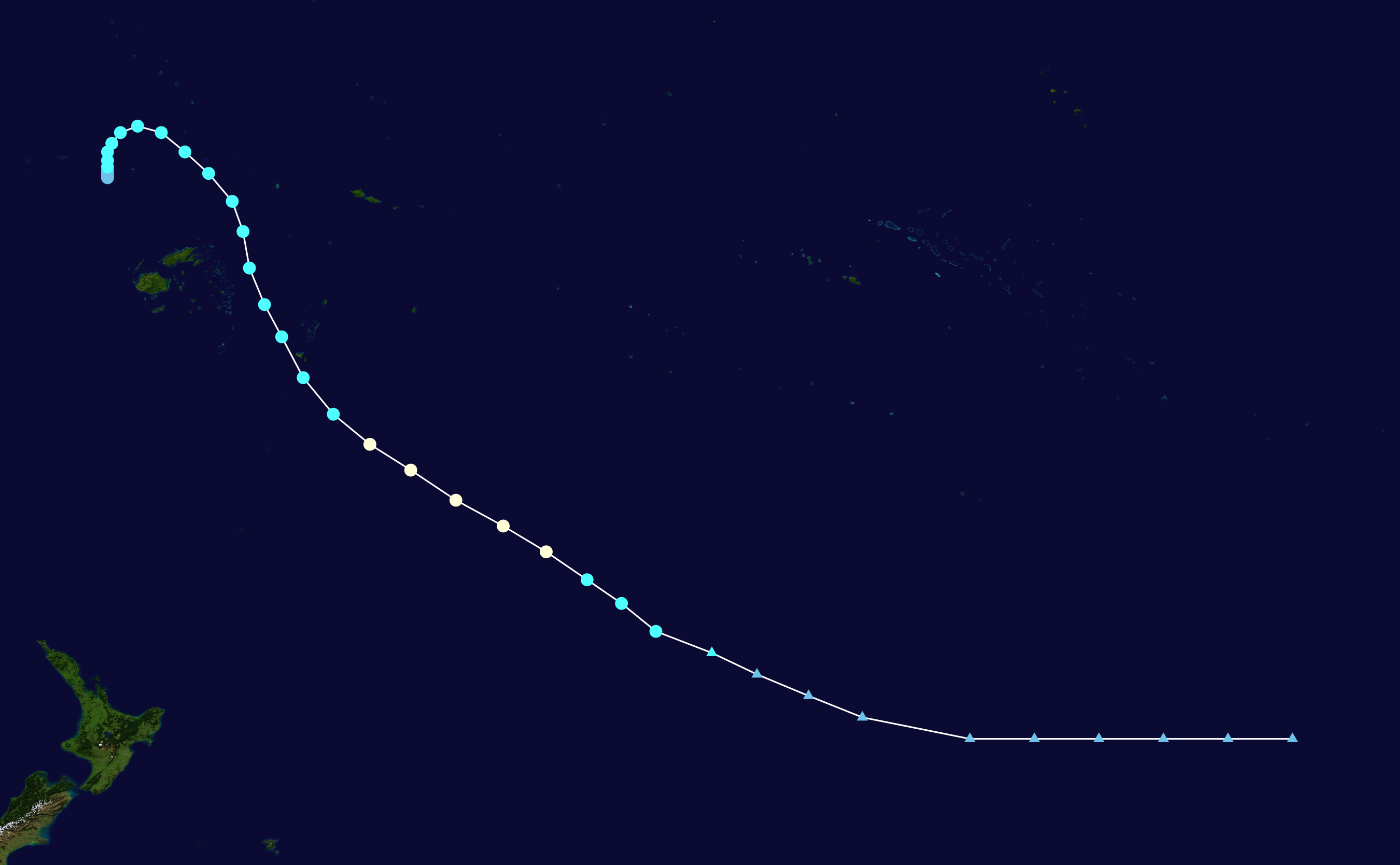
Map plotting the storm's track and intensity, according to the Saffir–Simpson scale Map key Saffir–Simpson scale Tropical depression (≤38 mph, ≤62 km/h) Tropical storm (39–73 mph, 63–118 km/h) Category 1 (74–95 mph, 119–153 km/h) Category 2 (96–110 mph, 154–177 km/h) Category 3 (111–129 mph, 178–208 km/h) Category 4 (130–156 mph, 209–251 km/h) Category 5 (≥157 mph, ≥252 km/h) Unknown Storm type Tropical cyclone Subtropical cyclone Extratropical cyclone, remnant low, tropical disturbance, or monsoon depression

During March 11, 1997, a shallow tropical depression developed within the monsoon trough near the Fijian Dependency of Rotuma. Over the next two days the depression remained near Rotuma with little to no movement, as it started to develop further in an area of minimal vertical wind shear and good upper air divergence. During March 13, as the system moved northwards, the United States Joint Typhoon Warning Center (JTWC) subsequently initiated advisories on the system and designated it as Tropical Cyclone 33P. During that day after having moved to the north, Hina curved to the east and later south-eastwards, before it passed about 55 km (35 mi) to the southeast of Niulakita the southernmost island of Tuvalu during March 14. Early on March 15, after the system had passed near Niulakita, the depression developed into a category 1 tropical cyclone on the Australian tropical cyclone intensity scale and was named Hina by the Fiji Meteorological Service (FMS). After being named the system accelerated towards the south-southeast and an area of increasing vertical wind shear, as it passed near the west coast of Futuna Island. The system also crossed the 180th meridian during that day, which prompted the JTWC to pass the responsibility for warning the United States Government to the Naval Pacific Meteorology and Oceanography Center (NPMOC).

Early on March 16, as Hina passed over the southern islands of Tonga, the FMS reported that based on satellite imagery and guidance from other meteorological centers, the system had 10-minute sustained wind speeds of 85 km/h (55 mph). Hina subsequently passed over the islands of Tongatapu and ʻEua in southern Tonga at around 08:30 UTC and took less than 2 hours to inflict considerable damage on the islands. The system subsequently emerged back into the South Pacific Ocean, with the FMS estimating that the system had storm-force winds of about 95 km/h (60 mph). Later that day the NPMOC estimated that Hina had peak 1-minute sustained wind speeds of 110 km/h (70 mph) as it rapidly moved below 25°S and out of the FMS's area of responsibility. Over the next few days the system continued to move towards the south-southeast and gradually weakened, before the NPMOC issued its final advisory during March 18, as the system was undergoing a transition to become an extratropical cyclone. The system weakened below tropical cyclone intensity during the next day, before it was last noted by MetService on March 21, while it was located about 1,500 km (930 mi) to the south of the Pitcairn Islands.

After an analysis of the observed data and the damage in Tonga, the FMS found that Hina's landfall intensity had been underestimated. The observed wind data suggested that the system had storm-force sustained winds, but had peak gusts comparable to hurricane force. Furthermore, the lowest pressure values indicated that the winds had to be stronger than estimated, for it to fit known wind-pressure relationships. The FMS subsequently deduced that Hina was a minimal category 3 severe tropical cyclone, with peak 10-minute sustained wind speeds of 120 km/h (75 mph) when it passed near or over Tongatapu at around 08:30 UTC (21:30 UTC+13). The NPMOC also revised their estimate of Hina's peak 1-minute sustained wind speeds from 110 km/h (70 mph) to 140 km/h (85 mph) during post-analysis, which made the system equivalent to a category 1 hurricane on the Saffir–Simpson hurricane wind scale.

== Preparations and impact ==
Cyclone Hina caused over US$15.2 million worth of damage and was indirectly responsible for one death as it affected Tuvalu, Wallis and Futuna and Tonga. The system's worst impact was reported on the Tongatapu and 'Eua, which are the southernmost islands of the Kingdom of Tonga. Due to the impact of this storm, the name Hina was retired from the tropical cyclone naming lists.

=== Tuvalu ===
On March 12, the FMS issued gale warnings for the southern islands of Tuvalu and a tropical cyclone alert for the rest of the archipelago. The gale warning was subsequently extended out to cover the whole of the archipelago during the next day, after marginal squally gale-force winds were observed to the north of the monsoon trough in association with the system. Over the next two days the warning was kept in force while Tuvalu experienced strong to gale-force winds because of a convergence zone located over the islands and Hina which passed about 55 km (35 mi) to the southeast of Niulakita, Tuvalu. Cyclone Hina was the second of three tropical cyclones to affect Tuvalu during the 1996-97 cyclone season, after Cyclone Gavin had severely damaged the islands a week earlier and Cyclone Keli affected the islands during June 1997.

Cyclone Gavin and Hina's waves, storm surge and strong winds both caused a severe amount of coastal erosion on all of the country’s nine atolls with about 6.7% of the land washed into the sea. Both cyclones caused severe coastal erosion and destruction to food crops, mostly to the southern islands of Niulakita and Nukulaelae, while damage in northern and central islands was confined mostly to houses. A damage assessment team noted that it was difficult to assess damage done by Hina alone and estimated the total damage from both cyclones at US$2.23 million (AU$2.14 million). (Note: This damage total was originally reported in Australian Dollars and was converted to USD via the Oanda Corporation website.) It was later estimated after Cyclone Keli had affected the islands between June 12–16, 1996, that the three cyclones had been responsible for about 50 hectares (120 acres) of land disappearing into the sea. Rehabilitation costs from all three cyclones, amounted to US$653,100 (AU$1 million).

=== Wallis and Futuna ===
Wettest tropical cyclones and their remnants in Wallis and Futuna Highest-known totals
Precipitation			Storm	Location	Ref.
Rank	mm	in	Storm	Location	Ref.
1	674.9	26.57	Raja 1986	Maopoopo, Futuna Island	
2	556.7	21.92	Fran 1992	Hihifo, Wallis Island	
3	291.2	11.46	Val 1975	Hihifo, Wallis Island	
4	220.6	8.69	Hina 1997	Maopoopo, Futuna Island	
5	186.0	7.32	Evan 2012	Futuna Island	
6	180.0	7.09	Val 1980	Maopoopo, Futuna Island	
7	171.6	6.76	Keli 1997	Hihifo, Wallis Island	
8	160.8	6.33	Unnamed 1966	Malaetoli, Wallis Island	
9	160.0	6.30	Amos 2016	Hihifo, Wallis Island	
10	119.0	4.69	Waka 2001	Hihifo, Wallis Island	

As the system developed into a tropical cyclone during March 14, gale warnings were issued for the French territory of Wallis and Futuna. The system at this time was located about 220 km (135 mi) to the northwest of Futuna Island and subsequently accelerated, towards the south-southeast and passed near the island during the next day. Cyclone Hina was the second of four tropical cyclones to affect Wallis and Futuna in a ten-month period, after Cyclone Gavin had severely damaged food crops ten days earlier and Cyclones Keli and Ron affected the islands during June 1997 and January 1998. During March 15 as Hina affected the islands, winds of 76 km/h (47 mph) and 115 km/h (71 mph) were recorded at Hihifo on Wallis and Maopoopo on Futuna respectively. Rainfall totals of 220.6 millimetres (8.69 in) and 182.5 mm (7.19 in) were also recorded at Maopoopo and in Point Vele respectively. Hina caused no significant damage on Walls Island, while it caused some damage to the crops and destroyed parts of the road on Futuna.

=== Tonga ===
Hina was the first of three tropical cyclones to affect Tonga during a ten-month period, with Cyclones Keli and Ron affecting the island nation during June 1997 and January 1998. Late on March 15, ahead of the system affecting Tonga, gale warnings were issued for the Southern Tongan island groups of Haʻapai, Tongatapu and Vavaʻu. During the next day, Hina took less than two hours to inflict considerable damage on the Tongan islands and became the worst tropical cyclone to affect Tonga since Cyclone Isaac during 1982. The two worst-affected Tongan islands were Tongatapu and 'Eua after major damages were reported on both islands. As the system impacted Tonga, the FMS received several reports of one or more tornadoes occurring in Tonga; however, during a post-disaster survey no evidence was found to prove or disprove this claim. It was noted that several of the badly damaged houses had little or no cyclone protection while over 600 people were left homeless. Damages were greater than had been expected, with an estimated damage total of about T$18.2 million Tongan Pa'anga (US$15.2 million) reported. A post disaster survey attributed the greater damages to higher than expected wind gusts caused by either a low level squall or a jet streak. There were no casualties reported as the system affected the island nation, however, Vaiola Hospital reported that they had treated a number of patients for injuries that were caused during the system's aftermath. One indirect death was also reported, after a sea captain suffered a heart attack while evacuating from his home. Within the islands severe damage to power lines and telecommunication systems was reported. The system affected the islands after the lowest tide for the day, as a result sea damage was minimal, though some evidence of salt damage to taro plantations was observed.

On the main island of Tongatapu, extensive damages to utilities, vegetation and agriculture in places, with more than 12,000 tonnes (26,000,000 lb) of fruit and food crops including banana trees and coconut palms destroyed. Some of the coconut palms were snapped, which suggested that wind gusts of between 165–185 km/h (105–115 mph) had been experienced on the island. Within Nukuʻalofa the capital city of Tonga, there was not a lot of structural damage reported; however, the villages to the east of the capital were severely affected. The roof and grand stand of Teufaiva Stadium was blown off, while the Parliament house, government buildings and schools were severely damaged. The MV Lofa was driven by fierce winds onto Mounu Reef in Nuku'alofa Harbour. The Electric and Water boards sustained over T$2.9 million in damage to its infrastructure, with power lines brought down throughout Tongatapu which caused a complete blackout during March 16. Some of the uprooted trees knocked down power lines, sometimes causing a domino effect of bringing down additional power poles. As a result of the electric problems, there was a lack of electrical power to power pumps, with the water supply becoming intermittent. On 'Eua Island, Hina was estimated to have caused greater damage then Cyclone Isaac had done fifteen years previously, after the island was completely devastated by the system. The Tongan Government estimated that damage to the wharfs on Lifuka and Foa islands would cost over T$10,000 to repair, while the land bridge between the two islands was closed after Hina's winds and waves swept boulders on to the bridge.

During the system's aftermath, insurance companies flew in people to assess the damage, while agricultural authorities on Tongatapu and 'Eua advised landowners to plant fast maturing produce such as sweet potatoes. The Tongan Government provided T$5 million (US$3.97 million) or about 5% of its national budget to facilitate the immediate start of emergency relief and repairs to essential services. Tents were supplied by the National Disaster Committee and Ministry of Works to act as temporary shelters for those who were homeless after the system. By March 19, the Tonga Electric Power Board had restored electricity to several consumers including major government buildings and the Nuku'alofa Business District. However, several consumers were expected to be without electric until at least June 1997. On March 25, the Acting Prime Minister of Tonga convened a meeting of donors, where an official request for international assistance was presented. At the meeting donors were requested to review existing of proposed bilateral programs, to see if they can be adjusted or brought forward to cater for the repairs or rebuilding of schools and other government buildings. The New Zealand Government deployed to Tonga, four electricity line mechanics, a fully equipped truck, along with various supplies including tarpaulins, blankets and electric. New Zealand also offered grants off up to NZ$120,000 to replace village water tanks, and NZ$7,000 towards the clean-up costs.

The Government of the United Kingdom granted T$60,000 (GB£30,000, US$48,000) for ten emergency generators, while the Chinese Government pledged T$36,000 (US$30,000). The French government provided a cargo plane, to conduct a damage survey of the affected areas and US$100,000 for tents, tarpaulins and blankets and two diesel generators. The Japanese Government provided tents, plastic sheets and other emergency aid materials to the value of T$59,000. Australia provided T$320,000 for temporary roof repairs and equipment to restore electricity supplies in both Tongatapu and 'Eua. Grants between T$22,000 and T$24,000 were pledged by Germany, Norway and the United Nations Department of Humanitarian Affairs respectively. By early September 1997, the reconstruction of primary school buildings damaged by the cyclone had been completed after the Tongan Government funded the project. New accommodation for primary school teachers in the Ha'apai islands and the Niuas was also completed after the Australian and New Zealand Governments funded the projects. MMI insurance provided the Tonga Amateur Sports Association with T$384,272 to cover damages to the Teufaiva Grand Stand.

== See also ==
- Cyclone Evan
