= Cyclone Keli =

South Pacific cyclone in 1997

Severe Tropical Cyclone Keli
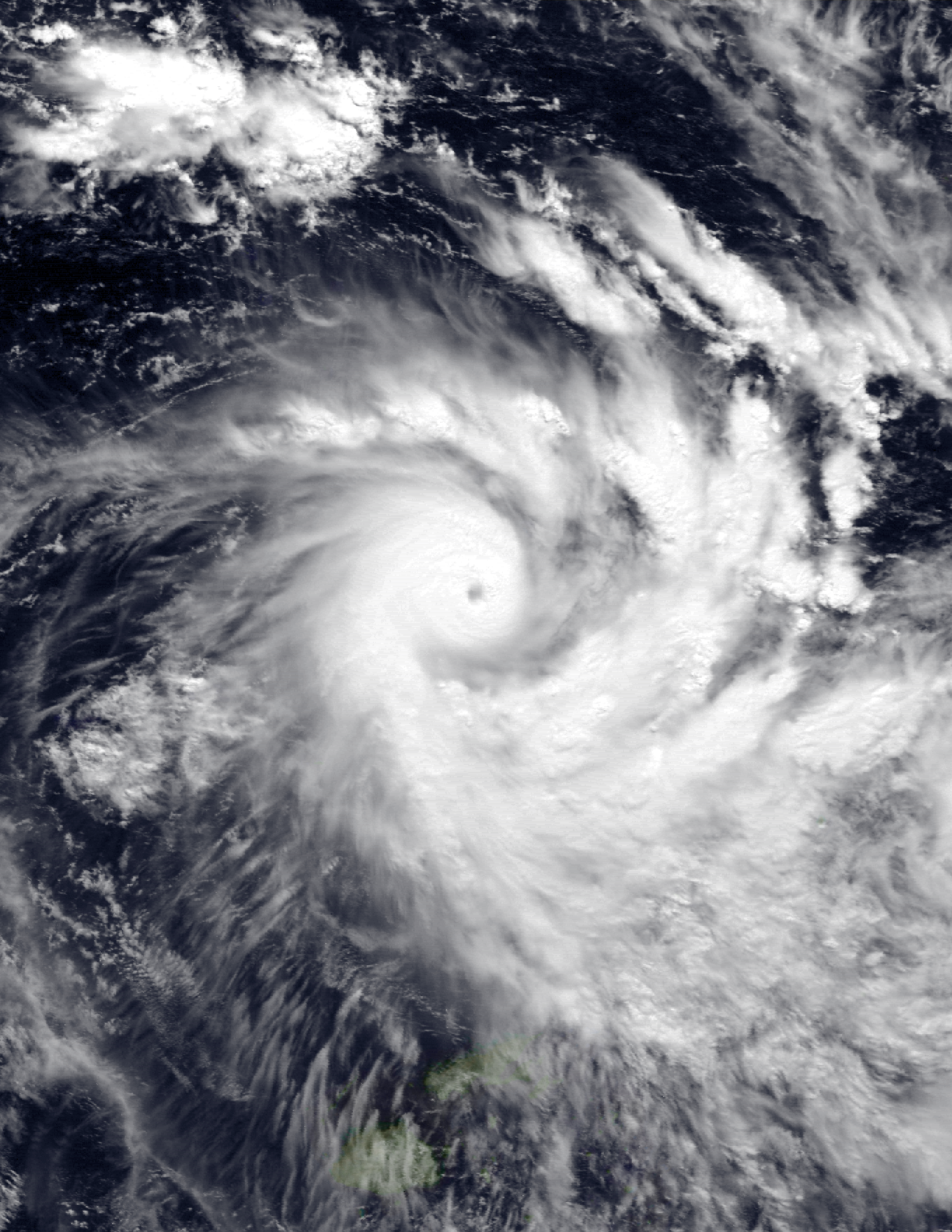
- Cyclone Keli moving through Tuvalu on June 12

Meteorological history
- Formed: June 7, 1997
- Extratropical: 15 June 1997
- Dissipated: June 17, 1997

Category 3 severe tropical cyclone
- 10-minute sustained (FMS)
- Highest winds: 150 km/h (90 mph)
- Lowest pressure: 955 hPa (mbar); 28.20 inHg

Category 4-equivalent tropical cyclone
- 1-minute sustained (SSHWS/NPMOC)
- Highest winds: 215 km/h (130 mph)
- Lowest pressure: 927 hPa (mbar); 27.37 inHg

Overall effects
- Damage: $10,000 (1997 USD)
- Areas affected: Tokelau; Tuvalu; Fiji; Tonga; Cook Islands
- IBTrACS
- Part of the 1996–97 South Pacific cyclone season

Severe Tropical Cyclone Keli (NPMOC/JTWC Designation: 38P) was the first recorded post-season tropical cyclone to form in June within the South Pacific Ocean. The system formed on June 7, 1997, about 460 kilometers (285 mi) to the north of Tokelau. The depression gradually developed over the next few days while moving southwestward. It was designated as Tropical Cyclone Keli early the next day. Cyclone Keli intensified, slowly reaching its 10-minute peak wind speeds of 150 km/h (90 mph), which made it a Category 3 severe tropical cyclone on the Australian Tropical Cyclone Intensity Scale. As it came under the influence of strong mid latitude westerlies and moved into an area of strong vertical wind shear, the cyclone started to weaken and was declared extratropical on June 15.

Cyclone Keli struck the islands of Tuvalu on June 12 and 13, with extensive damage reported throughout the Islands with trees uprooted by wind and waves. On Nivalakita, all buildings except for the church were flattened; an estimated cost to rebuild all of the houses as they were before the cyclone hit was estimated at A$12,000 (US$10,000), while it was estimated that the cost of rebuilding the houses with an improved, cyclone-resistant design would be about A$84,000 (US$63,000). The whole of Tepuka Savilivili was left uninhabitable, as coconut trees and other vegetation were swept away with no more than an area of jagged coral left behind. In Fiji, strong winds and rough seas were reported from the cyclone as it was moving to the north of Fiji, and while the cyclone was weakening it dropped 3.76 inches (95.5mm) of rain on American Samoa.

== Meteorological history ==
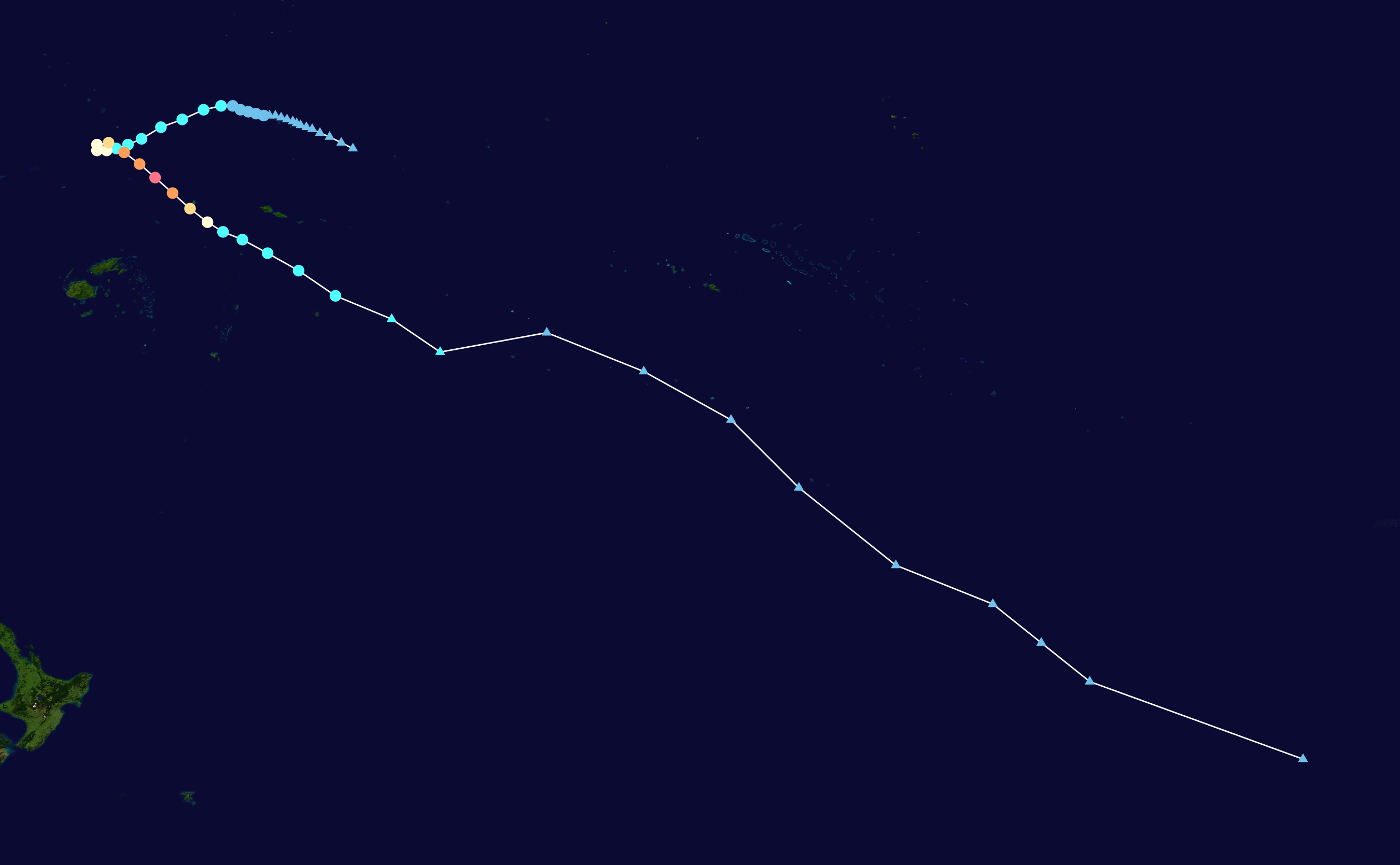
Map plotting the storm's track and intensity, according to the Saffir–Simpson scale Map key Saffir–Simpson scale Tropical depression (≤38 mph, ≤62 km/h) Tropical storm (39–73 mph, 63–118 km/h) Category 1 (74–95 mph, 119–153 km/h) Category 2 (96–110 mph, 154–177 km/h) Category 3 (111–129 mph, 178–208 km/h) Category 4 (130–156 mph, 209–251 km/h) Category 5 (≥157 mph, ≥252 km/h) Unknown Storm type Tropical cyclone Subtropical cyclone Extratropical cyclone, remnant low, tropical disturbance, or monsoon depression

During June 7, the Fiji Meteorological Service (FMS) reported that a weak tropical low had emerged from the South Pacific Convergence Zone, to the northeast of the New Zealand territory of Tokelau. Over the next couple of days, the low gradually developed further as it was steered slowly westwards by mid-level easterly winds, into an area of strong upper-level diffulence and an abnormal area of high sea-surface temperatures. During June 9, the United States Naval Pacific Meteorology and Oceanography Center (NPMOC) issued a tropical cyclone formation alert for the system, before they initiated advisories on the system and designated it as Tropical Cyclone 38P at 00:00 UTC (12:00 Tuvalu Time (TVT)) on June 10. Six hours later, the FMS named the system Keli after it had developed into a category 1 tropical cyclone on the Australian tropical cyclone intensity scale, while it was located about 335 km (205 mi) to the northeast of the island of Niulakita in Tuvalu. After being named, the system moved south-westwards towards Niulakita as it continued to gradually intensify becoming a category 2 tropical cyclone, before it passed just to the north of the island at about 03:00 UTC (15:00 TVT) on June 11. As Keli approached Niulakita, its general movement slowed down and it performed a clockwise cyclonic loop to the north of the island, while a mid-level trough of low pressure approached the system from the west. As a result of its slow movement keeping the system in an area of low vertical windshear, Keli continued to intensify with a cloud-filled eye appearing on satellite imagery.

During June 12, the system accelerated south-eastwards and started to pose a threat to the French territory of Wallis and Futuna as it passed in between Niulakita and Nukulaelae. Later that day, at about 06:00 UTC (18:00 TVT), the FMS estimated that Keli had peaked in intensity as a category 3 severe tropical cyclone, with 10-minute sustained winds of 150 km/h (90 mph). Twelve hours later, the NPMOC reported that Keli had peaked with 1-minute sustained wind speeds of 215 km/h (130 mph), which made it equivalent to a Category 4 hurricane on the Saffir-Simpson hurricane wind scale. After it had peaked in intensity, Keli encountered higher levels of vertical windshear which caused it to start to weaken and transition into an extratropical cyclone, before it passed about 55 km (35 mi) to the west of Wallis during June 13. After the system had passed to the west of Wallis, Keli continued to move south-eastwards and weakened into a category 2 tropical cyclone, before it passed about 110 km (70 mi) to the north of Niuatoputopu in northern Tonga and 175 km (110 mi) to the northeast of the island nation of Niue during June 14. During the following day, the NPMOC reported that the system had degenerated into extratropical cyclone and issued their final advisory before the FMS reported that Keli had degenerated into a tropical depression, while it was located about 370 km (230 mi) to the west of Rarotonga in the Cook Islands. Later that day, the system's remnants passed near the island of Mauke in the Southern Cook Islands at about 12:00 UTC (02:00 Cook Islands Time), before they were last noted by New Zealand's MetService during June 17, as they moved past 120°W about 2140 km (1330 mi) to the southeast of Adamstown in the Pitcairn Islands.

== Effects ==
The name Keli was retired after this usage of the name and was replaced with the name Kofi.

=== Tuvalu ===
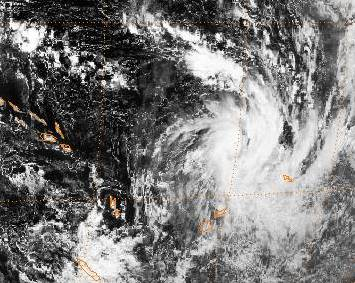
Image of Keli at peak intensity on June 12, 1997

Keli was the third tropical cyclone to impact Tuvalu during the 1996-97 cyclone season after Severe Tropical Cyclones Gavin and Hina impacted the island nation in March 1997. Ahead of the system impacting Tuvalu, storm and gale-force wind warnings were issued for the islands of Niulakita and Nukulaelae, while a strong wind warning was issued for the rest of the group during June 10. During that day the system moved south-westwards and passed near or over Niulakita later that day, before it performed a cyclonic loop and passed within 65 km (40 mi) of Niulakita during June 12.

As Cyclone Keli struck the islands of Tuvalu on June 12 and 13, peak wind gusts of 165 km/h (105 mph) were reported, with extensive damage also reported throughout the Islands with trees uprooted by wind and waves. On Nivalakita all buildings except for the church were flattened with an estimated cost to rebuild the houses exactly as they were was estimated at A$12,000 (US$10,000 1997), while it was estimated that the cost of rebuilding the houses with an improved, cyclone-resistant design would be about A$84,000 (US$63,000 1997). Also on Nivalakita communications were cut with the telephone operator having to resort to sending a Morse code message, however as the storm re-curved and re-hit Tuvalu on June 14, it silenced the weak radio telegraph system. In Tepuka Savilivili the whole island was left uninhabitable as coconut trees and other vegetation were swept away with no more than an area of jagged coral left behind.

As a result of limited food supplies on Funafuti for the island nation, the then Governor General Sir Tulaga Manuella declared Tuvalu to be under a state of public of emergency with effect from June 12. This enabled the High Commission of Tuvalu in Suva, Fiji to appeal to the governments of Australia, New Zealand, United Kingdom, France, Korea amongst others, as well as the United Nations Development Programme for aid. Officials from the Governments of Australia, France and New Zealand subsequently collaborated and worked out what assistance could be provided, before the Royal New Zealand Air Force deployed a transport plane during June 14, which contained tarpaulins, water containers, food, clothing, and medical supplies. The plane's crew subsequently conducted an aerial assessment of the damage on Niulakita and reported seeing widespread damage, before they arrived at Funafuti Airport on June 15.

=== Wallis and Futuna ===
Cyclone Keli was the third out of four tropical cyclones to impact the French Territory of Wallis and Futuna during a ten-month period, after Cyclones Gavin and Hina had affected the island during March 1997. There was almost no damage recorded in the archipelago from Keli, while rainfall totals of 171.6 mm (6.76 in) and 160 mm (6.3 in) were recorded at Hihifo and Aka'aka on Wallis during June 11. Wind gusts of up to 70 km/h (45 mph) were recorded at Maopoopo on Futuna island during July 13.

=== Samoan Islands ===
A rainfall total of 160 mm (6.3 in) was reported at Afono in American Samoa.

=== Tonga ===
Keli was the second of three tropical cyclones to affect Tonga during a ten-month period, with Cyclones Hina and Ron affecting the island nation during March 1997 and January 1998. Ahead of the system impacting Tonga, the FMS issued cyclone warnings for the Niuas and strong wind warnings for the rest of Tonga. As a result of the warnings a vessel that was heading to the island group had to be recalled, which was predicted to affect supplies on the islands when it was likely to be most needed. During June 13, Keli caused some damage to the islands with plantations, breadfruit trees and other large trees devastated. The strong winds also destroyed several residences while causing damage to public buildings.

=== Niue ===
Keli was the first and only tropical cyclone to impact the island of Niue during the 1996-97 season, as it moved south-eastwards and weakened into a tropical depression between June 13 - 15. On the island, an average windspeed of 46 km/h (29 mph), momentary wind gusts of 74 km/h (46 mph) and a rainfall total of 66.2 mm (2.61 in) were reported on the island. The strong winds were mainly felt in the eastern, northern and western villages where residents were blown over, while several banana and coconut trees were blown down.

== See also ==
- List of off-season South Pacific tropical cyclones
