= Cyclone Gavin =

Category 4 South Pacific cyclone in 1997

Severe Tropical Cyclone Gavin
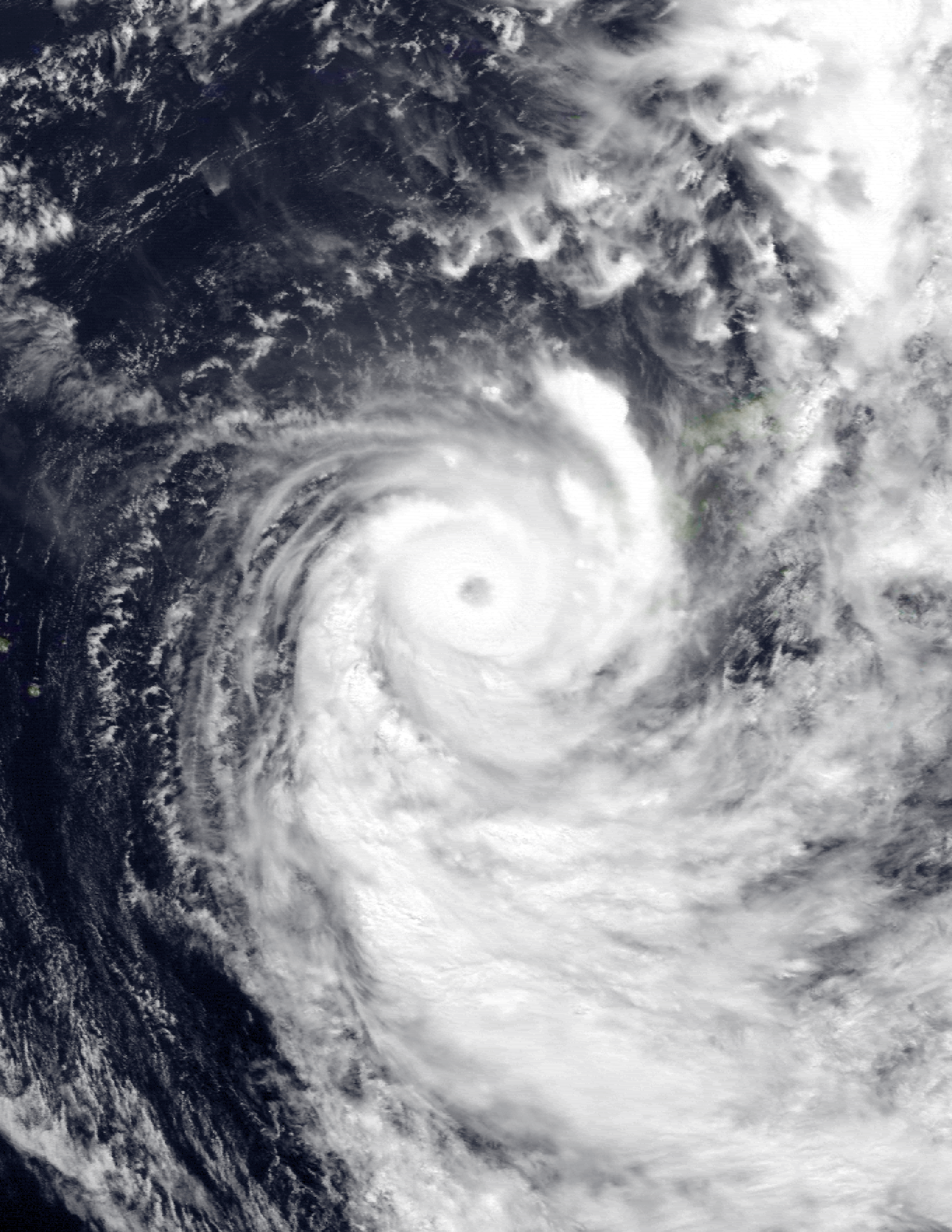
- Cyclone Gavin near peak intensity on 7 March

Meteorological history
- Formed: 2 March 1997
- Extratropical: 10 March 1997
- Dissipated: 14 March 1997

Category 4 severe tropical cyclone
- 10-minute sustained (FMS)
- Highest winds: 185 km/h (115 mph)
- Lowest pressure: 925 hPa (mbar); 27.32 inHg

Category 4-equivalent tropical cyclone
- 1-minute sustained (SSHWS/JTWC)
- Highest winds: 220 km/h (140 mph)
- Lowest pressure: 927 hPa (mbar); 27.37 inHg

Overall effects
- Fatalities: 18
- Damage: $24.9 million (1997 USD)
- Areas affected: Tuvalu, Wallis and Futuna, Fiji, New Zealand
- IBTrACS
- Part of the 1996–97 South Pacific cyclone season

Severe Tropical Cyclone Gavin was the most intense tropical cyclone to affect Fiji, since Cyclone Oscar of the 1982–83 cyclone season and was the first of three tropical cyclones to affect the island nations of Tuvalu and Wallis and Futuna during the 1996–97 season. The system that was to become Gavin was first identified during 2 March, as a weak tropical depression that had developed within the monsoon trough of low pressure. Over the next two days the depression gradually developed further, before it was named Gavin by RSMC Nadi early on 4 March as it had developed into a tropical cyclone.

== Meteorological history ==
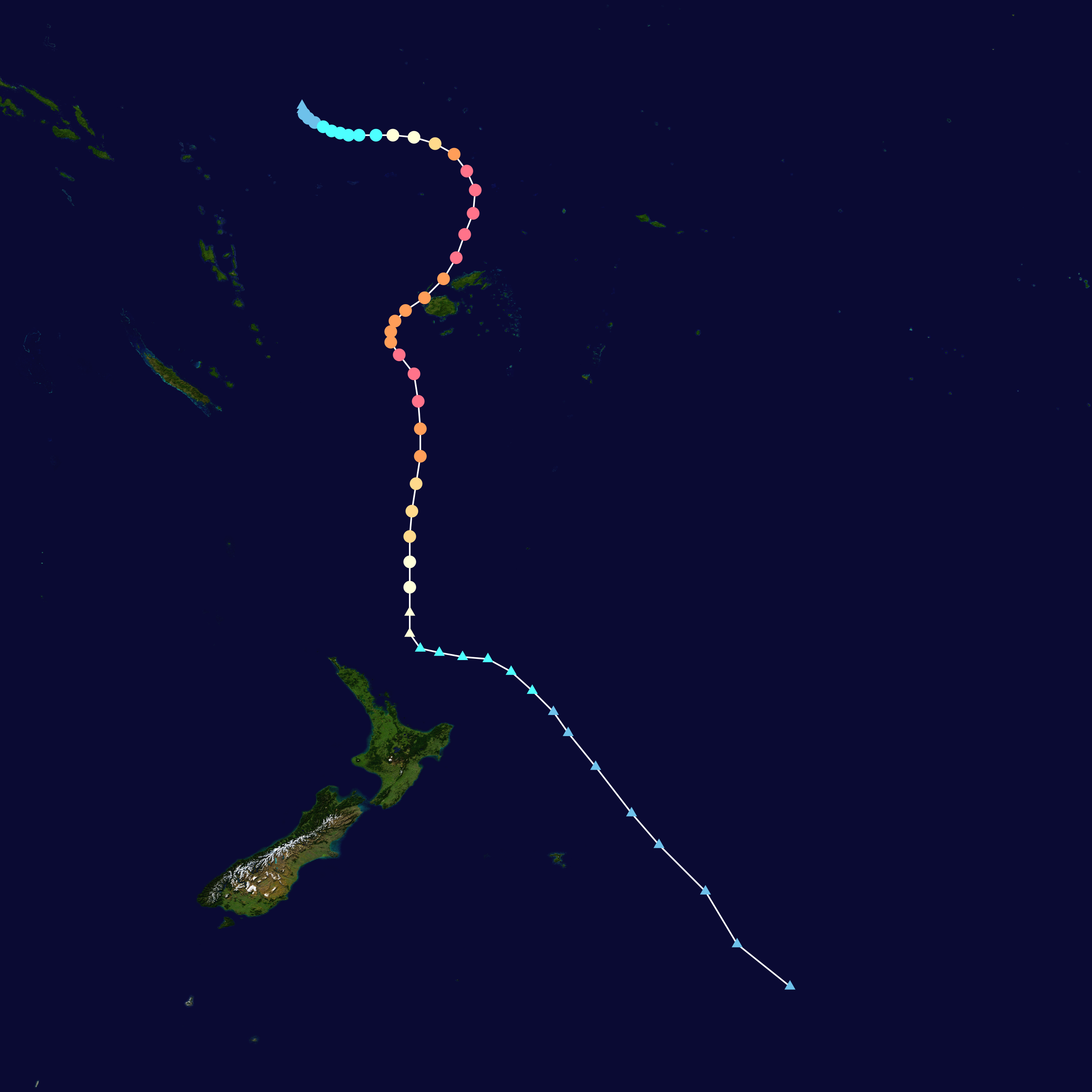
Map plotting the storm's track and intensity, according to the Saffir–Simpson scale Map key Saffir–Simpson scale Tropical depression (≤38 mph, ≤62 km/h) Tropical storm (39–73 mph, 63–118 km/h) Category 1 (74–95 mph, 119–153 km/h) Category 2 (96–110 mph, 154–177 km/h) Category 3 (111–129 mph, 178–208 km/h) Category 4 (130–156 mph, 209–251 km/h) Category 5 (≥157 mph, ≥252 km/h) Unknown Storm type Tropical cyclone Subtropical cyclone Extratropical cyclone, remnant low, tropical disturbance, or monsoon depression

At the start of March 1997, the monsoon trough of low pressure over the southern Pacific became better organised, while atmospheric convection persisted and increased in coverage. On 2 March 1997, the Fiji Meteorological Service (FMS) reported that a tropical depression had developed within the monsoon trough, about 705 km (440 mi) to the northwest of the Fijian dependency of Rotuma. Over the next day, gradually became better organised as it moved southeastwards, within an area of weak vertical windshear and warm sea surface temperatures. At around 21:00 FST (09:00 UTC) on 3 March, the United States Joint Typhoon Warning Center (JTWC) initiated advisories on the system and designated it as Tropical Cyclone 31P. The system subsequently continued to organise further, before the FMS reported that the depression had become a category 1 tropical cyclone on the Australian tropical cyclone intensity scale and named it Gavin at 12:00 FST (00:00 UTC) on 4 March. After being named Gavin moved eastwards towards the southern Tuvaluan Islands and intensified quickly, with the JTWC reporting later that day that the system had become equivalent to a Category 1 hurricane on the Saffir-Simpson hurricane scale (SSHS).

Early on 5 March, RSMC Nadi reported that Gavin had become a category 3 severe tropical cyclone after the system had developed an eye. During that day two troughs of low pressure combined to steer the system to the southeast as it passed about 50 km (30 mi) to the southwest of Niulakita, Tuvalu with estimated 10-minute sustained wind speeds of about 155 km/h (96 mph). After Gavin had intensified throughout that day, RSMC Nadi reported at 1800 UTC, that the system had become a category 4 severe tropical cyclone, while the JTWC reported that the cyclone had reached its initial peak intensity with 1-minute sustained winds of 220 km/h (140 mph), which made it equivalent to a category 4 hurricane on the SSHWS. Early on 6 March, RSMC Nadi reported that Gavin was moving towards Fiji and had reached its peak intensity as a category 4 severe tropical cyclone, with 10-minute sustained winds of 185 km/h (115 mph). Later that day the system passed about 215 km (135 mi) to the west of the French territory of Futuna, before it started to weaken as it passed about 95 km (60 mi) to the northwest of Labasa on the Fijian Island of Vanua Levu.

== Preparations and impact ==
Severe Tropical Cyclone Gavin was responsible for at least 18 deaths as it affected Fiji and parts of Polynesia, before it was retired from the tropical cyclone naming lists.

=== Tuvalu ===
Gavin was the first of three tropical cyclones to affect Tuvalu during the 1996-97 cyclone season, with Cyclones Hina and Keli affecting the islands later in the season. Ahead of the system affecting the Polynesian island nation, hurricane warnings were issued for Niulakita and Nukulaelae, while gale or storm warnings were issued for the rest of Tuvalu. During the next day these warnings were gradually revised once it became clearer that Gavin was moving towards the southeast and away from the island nation, before all warnings were cancelled by 0600 UTC on 6 March. After both Gavin and Hina had affected the island nation within a week off each other, a damage assessment team noted that it was difficult to assess damage done by Gavin alone and estimated the total damage from both cyclones at US$2.23 million, (AU$2.14 million). (Note: This damage total was originally reported in Australian Dollars and was converted to USD via the Oanda Corporation website.) Both cyclones caused severe coastal erosion and destruction to food crops, on the southern islands of Niulakita and Nukulaelae, while damage in northern and central islands was confined mostly to houses. The cyclones waves, storm surge and strong winds both caused a severe amount of coastal erosion on all of the country's nine atolls, with about 6.7% of the land washed into the sea. It was later estimated that the three cyclones had been responsible for about 50 hectares (120 acres) of land disappearing into the sea.

=== Wallis and Futuna ===
Early on 5 March, the FMS issued a tropical cyclone alert for the French Overseas Territory, as Gavin was moving slowly towards the east — southeast and heading towards the islands. Later that day as Gavin turned and started to move southwards the FMSupgraded the alert to a gale warning for Futuna, but due to the turn to the south it was felt that a warning for Wallis Island wasn't needed. The alert for Wallis was subsequently cancelled early the next day while the Gale Warning was maintained for Futuna, as that island was still expected to be within the extent of gale-force winds during that day. The gale warning for Futuna was cancelled later that day, after Gavin had moved well to the southwest of the island and moving further away. Most of the damage on the French territory was confined to the exposed northeast coastal parts of Futuna, where a heavy swell caused sea flooding at high tide and several food crops were damaged by the wind. This heavy swell resulted in some roads and public networks, being partially destroyed and some traditional houses being damaged. On Wallis Island, only a small amount of damage was reported, with some traditional houses and food crops flooded on the north coast by seawater at high tide.

=== Fiji ===
During 4 March, the FMSissued a tropical cyclone alert for Rotuma, as it was possible that Gavin could produce gale-force winds or pass over the island within 48 hours. However the alert was cancelled during the next day, after the cyclone had passed about 260 km (160 mi) to the northeast of the island and was no longer expected to produce any damage or gale-force winds on the island. As they cancelled the alert for Rotuma, the FMSissued an alert for Fiji as it was apparent that Gavin was moving southwards towards the archipelago, before they started to issue various gale and storm warnings for Fiji during 6 March. Over the next two days, the FMSissued various gale, storm and hurricane warnings for Fiji, as the system passed through the archipelago, before all warnings for Fiji were cancelled during 8 March, after it had become apparent that gales were no longer affecting any part of Fiji.

Cyclone Gavin was the most destructive cyclone to affect Fiji since Cyclone Kina and became one of the most intense tropical cyclone on record to affect Fiji, after the meteorological station on Yasawa recorded a minimum pressure of 937 hPa (27.67 inHg). Heavy rain associated with Gavin caused serious flooding in Labasa and western parts of Viti Levu and caused serious flooding of the Nadi and Ba rivers. Major destruction of sugar cane and other food crops also occurred while at least 18 deaths were attributed to Gavin. This included 10 people lost at sea when a fishing vessel, the Wasawasa I, sank, and another 8 deaths caused by landslides, electrocution, and drowning. The total damage bill was estimated at US$23.7 million (AU$30.1 million, FJ$33.4 million). However, despite devastating several parts of Fiji, Gavins turn to the southwest just before it moved through the island nation spared Fijis two main populated islands of Vanua Levu and Viti Levu the full brunt of the cyclone.

=== New Zealand ===
After it moved out of the tropics, Gavin moved southwards and affected New Zealand between 11 and 13 March with high seas, heavy rain gale-force winds and wind gusts of up to 130 km/h (81 mph). As a result of the heavy rain, some flooding was reported in parts of the Northland, Waikato, Bay of Plenty and Gisborne, which led to road closures.

== See also ==
- Cyclone Evan
