= Time in Tuvalu =

Time in Tuvalu is given by Tuvalu Time (TVT; UTC+12:00). Tuvalu Time does not have an associated daylight saving time.

Tuvalu is located at the longitude of 176° to 180°, west of the International Date Line.

== IANA time zone database ==
In the IANA time zone database, Tuvalu is given one time zone:

c.c.*	coordinates*	TZ*	Comments	UTC offset	DST
TV	−0831+17913	Pacific/Funafuti		+12:00	+12:00
