= 1979–80 South Pacific cyclone season =

Tropical cyclone season

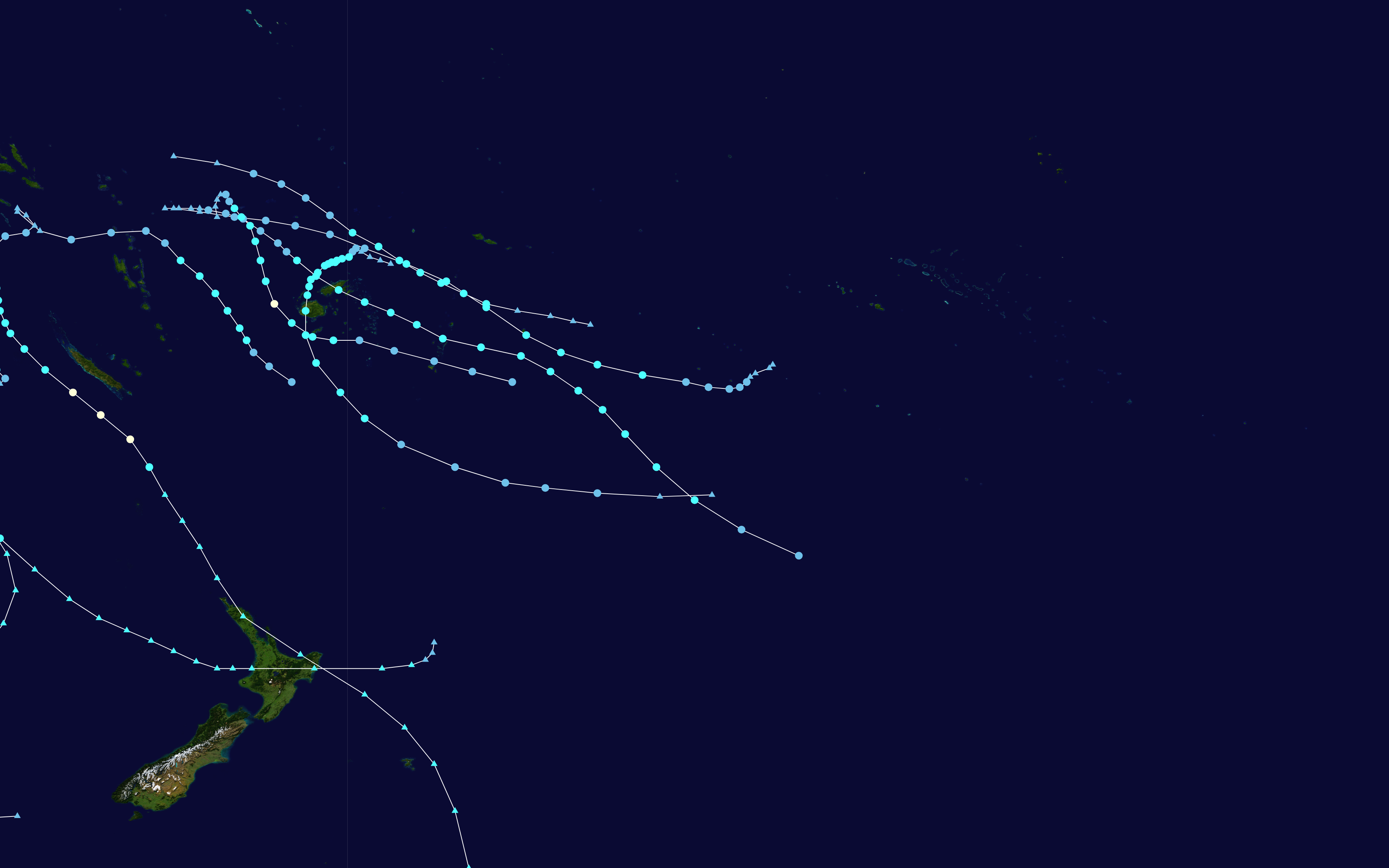
- Season summary map

Seasonal boundaries
- First system formed: December 9, 1979
- Last system dissipated: April 8, 1980

Strongest storm
- Name: Peni/Sina
  - Maximum winds: 120 km/h (75 mph) (10-minute sustained)
  - Lowest pressure: 970 hPa (mbar)

Seasonal statistics
- Total depressions: 8
- Tropical cyclones: 7
- Severe tropical cyclones: 2
- Total fatalities: Unknown
- Total damage: Unknown

Related articles
- 1979–80 South-West Indian Ocean cyclone season; 1979–80 Australian region cyclone season

The 1979–80 South Pacific cyclone season saw mostly weak systems.

== Systems ==
=== Tropical Cyclone Ofa ===
- Category 2 tropical cyclone (Australian scale)
- Tropical storm (SSHWS)
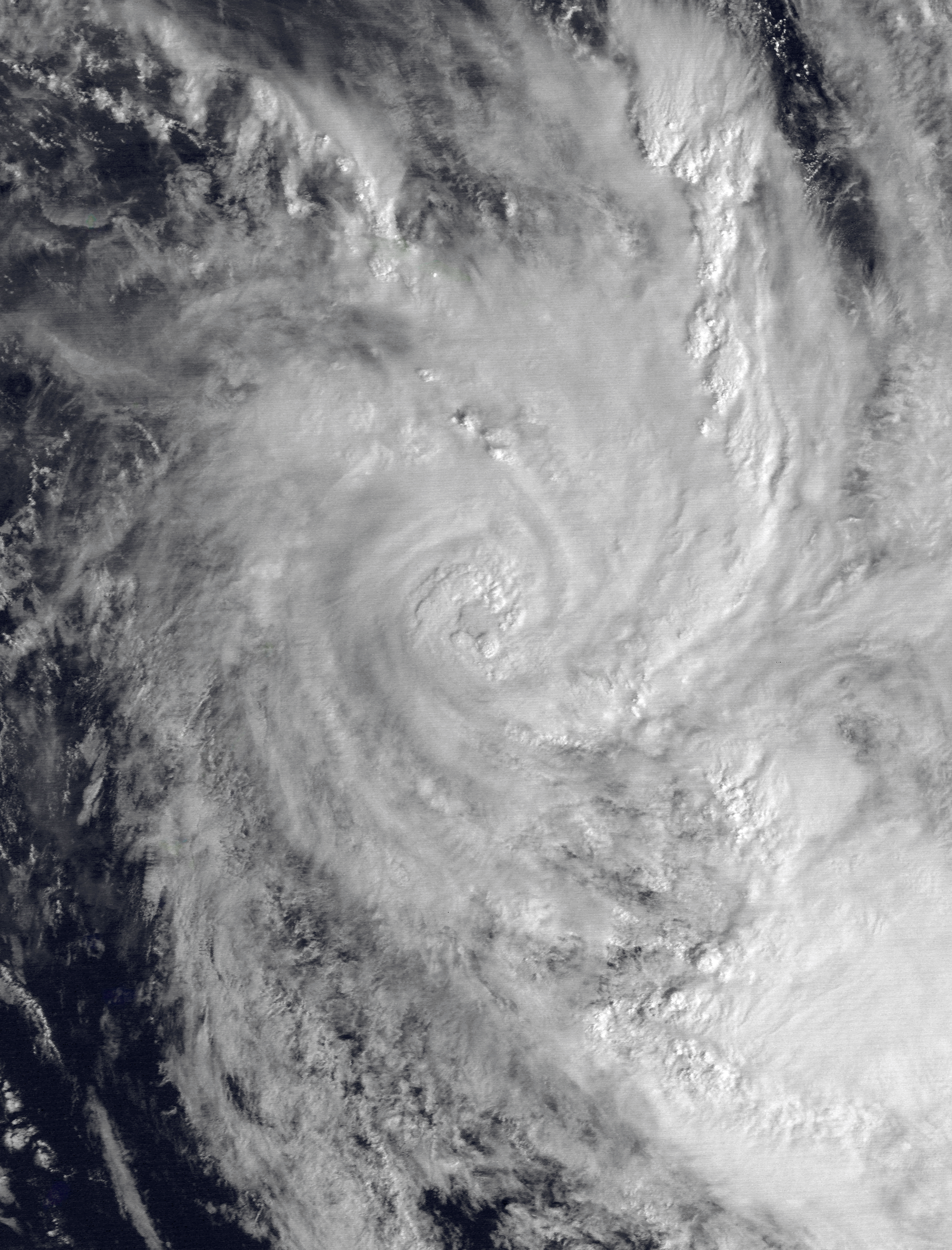
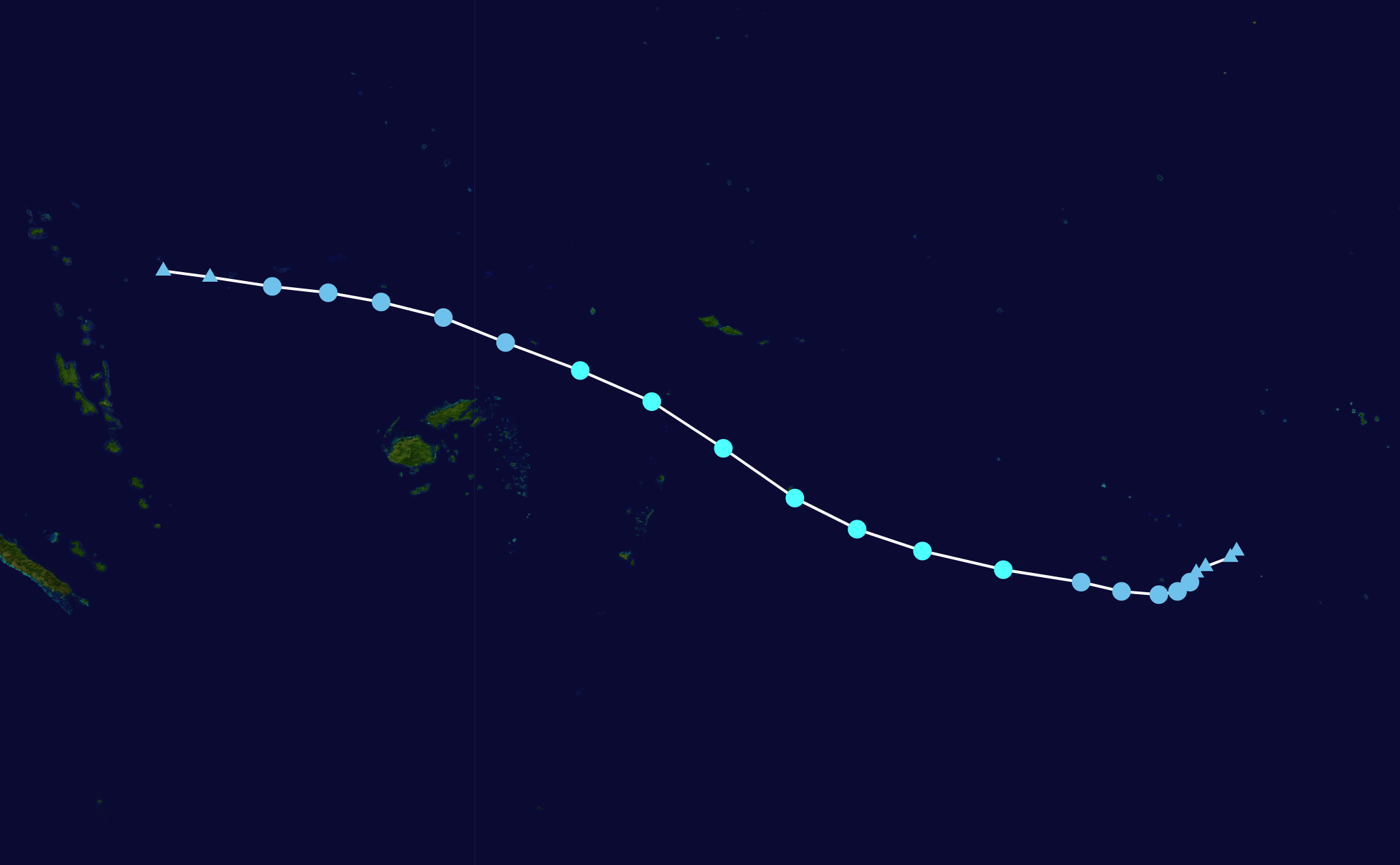
- Duration: December 9 – December 15
- Peak intensity: 100 km/h (65 mph) (10-min); 980 hPa (mbar)

Ofa was classified on December 9. For several days it slowly deepened and on December 12 attained peak intensity while moving eastward. Three days later Ofa was no more.

=== Severe Tropical Cyclone Peni ===
- Category 3 severe tropical cyclone (Australian scale)
- Category 1 tropical cyclone (SSHWS)
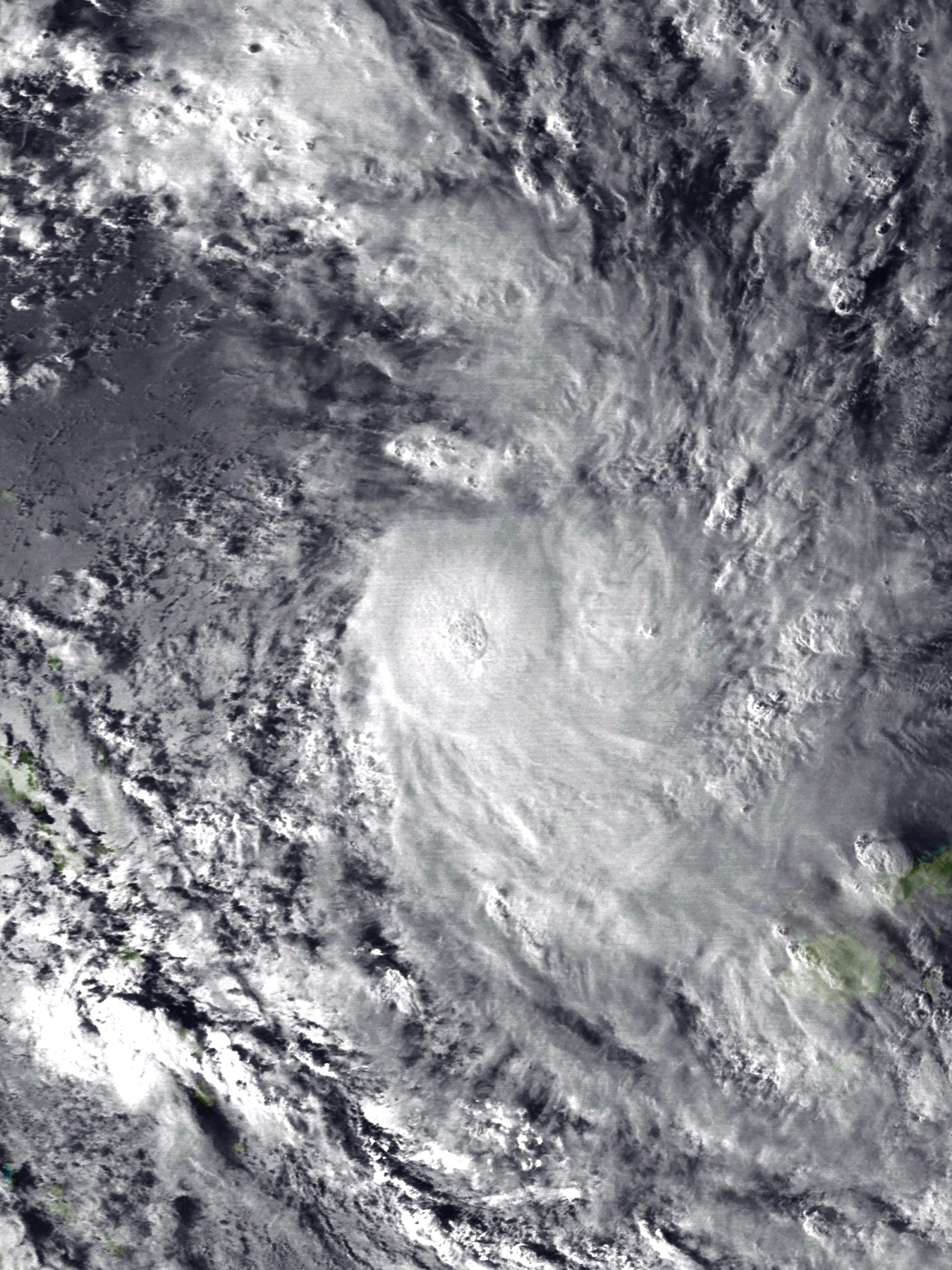
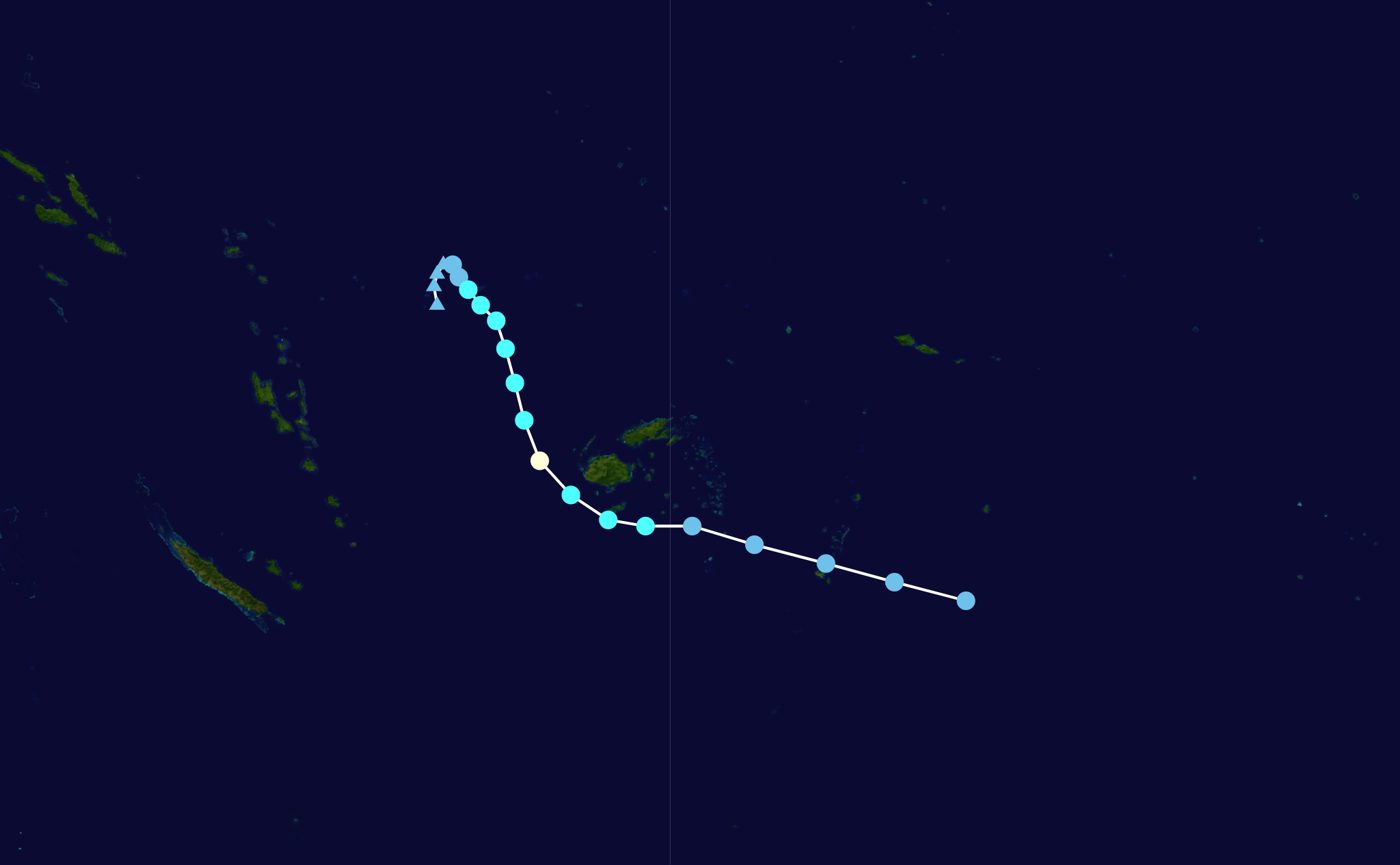
- Duration: January 1 – January 6
- Peak intensity: 120 km/h (75 mph) (10-min); 970 hPa (mbar)

Peni existed from January 1 to 6.

=== Tropical Cyclone Rae ===
- Category 1 tropical cyclone (Australian scale)
- Tropical storm (SSHWS)
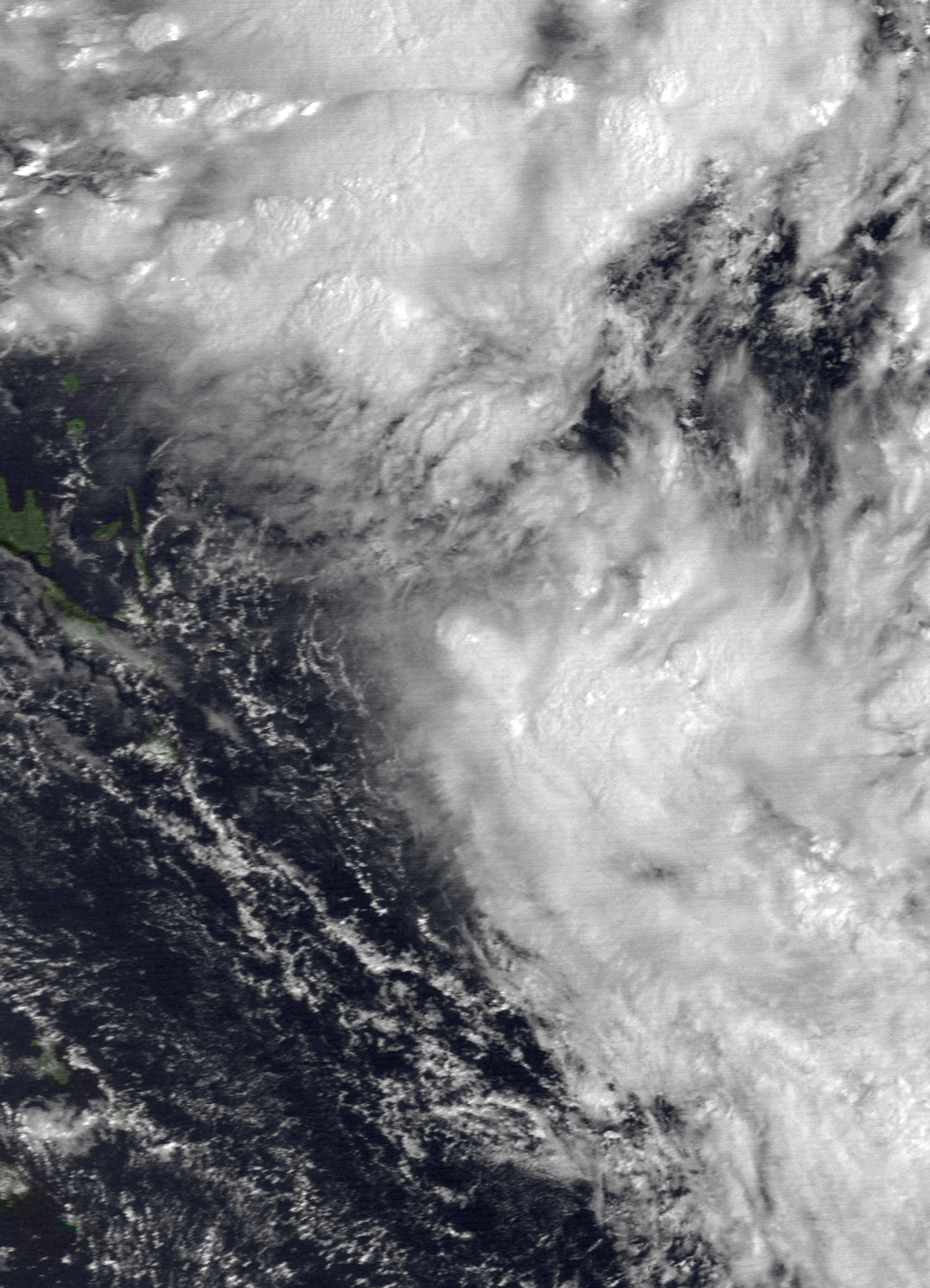
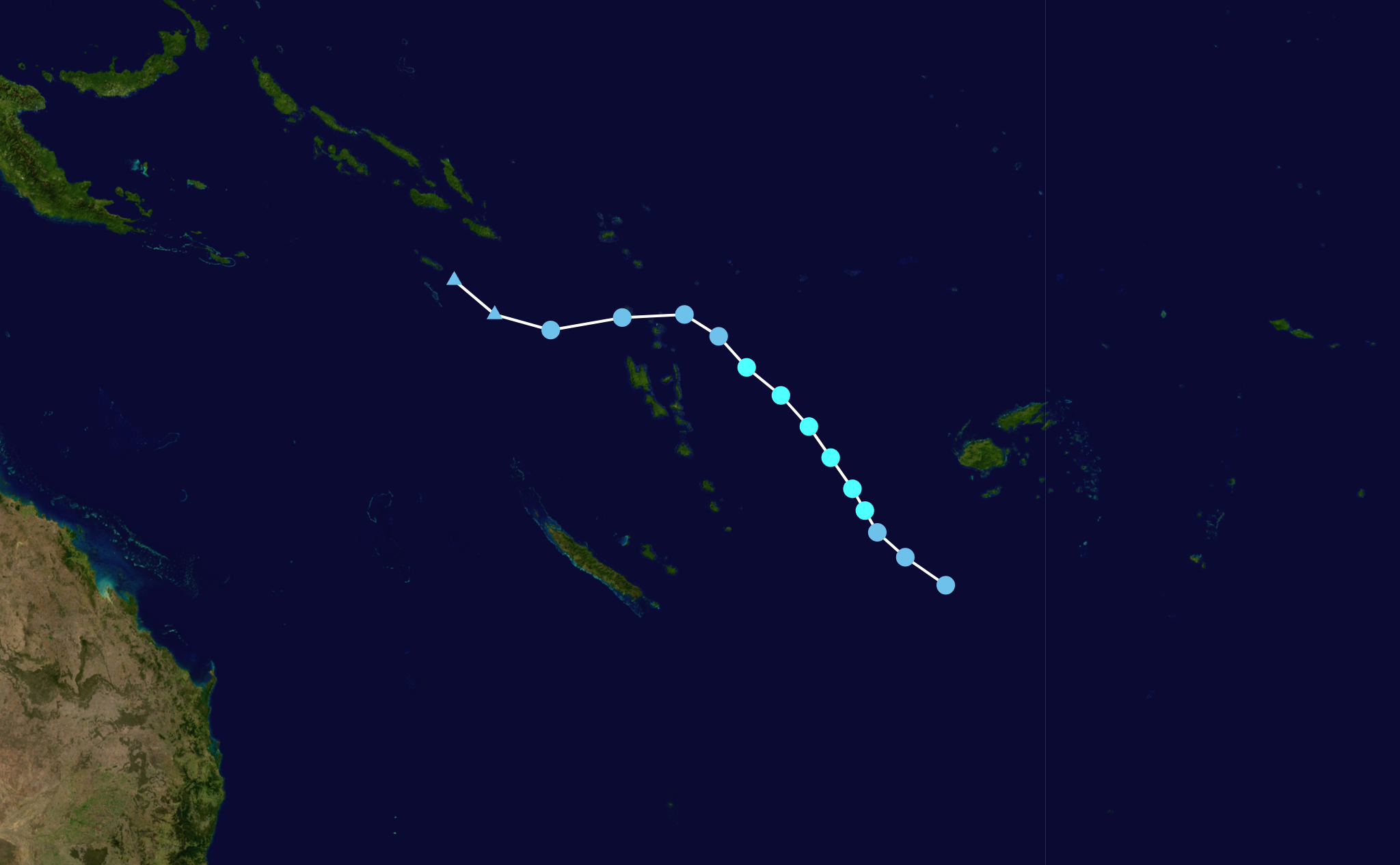
- Duration: February 2 – February 5
- Peak intensity: 75 km/h (45 mph) (10-min); 990 hPa (mbar)

Rae lasted five days from February 2 to 7. It remained weak.

=== Tropical Cyclone Simon ===
- Category 2 tropical cyclone (Australian scale)
- Tropical storm (SSHWS)
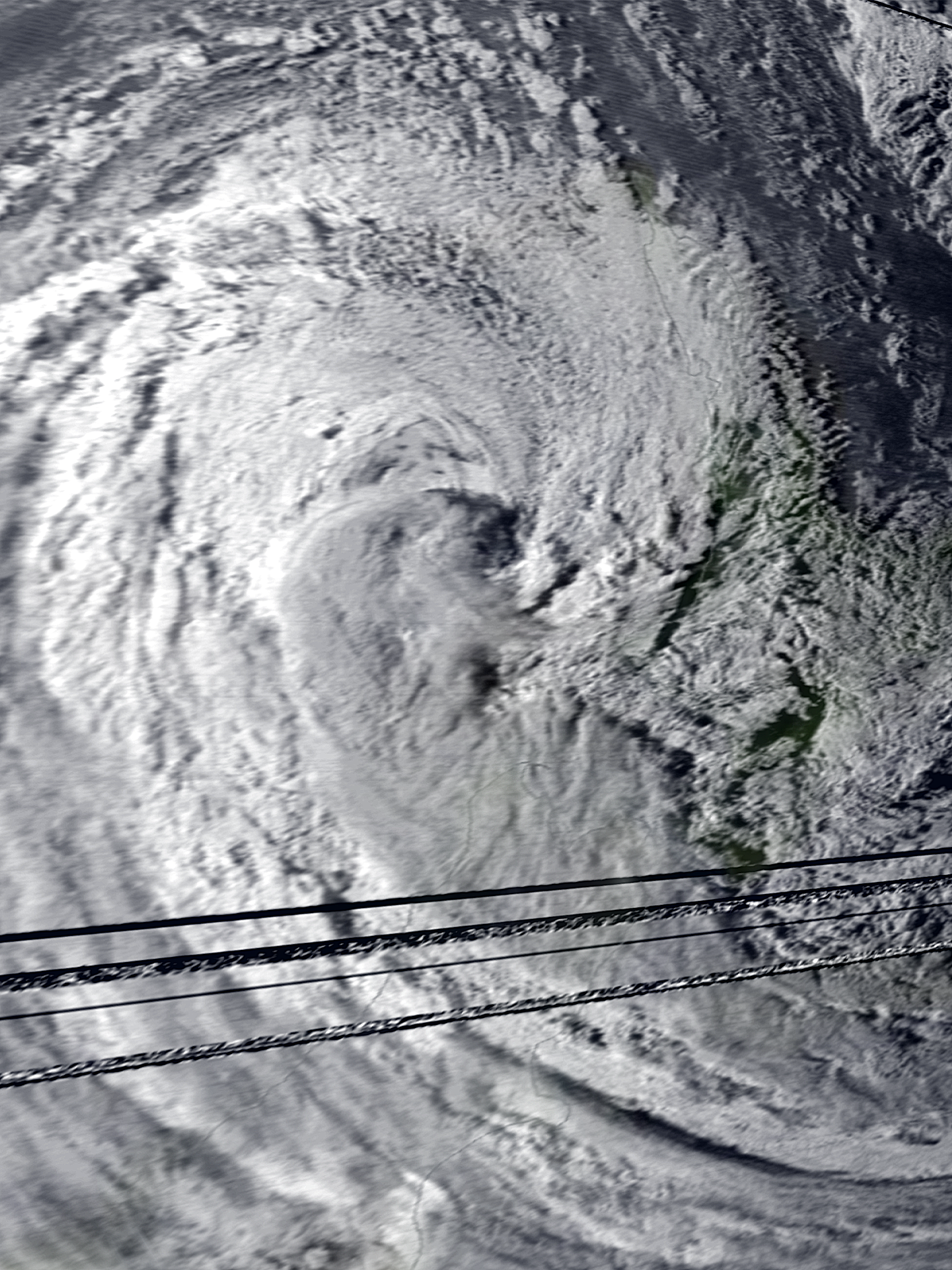
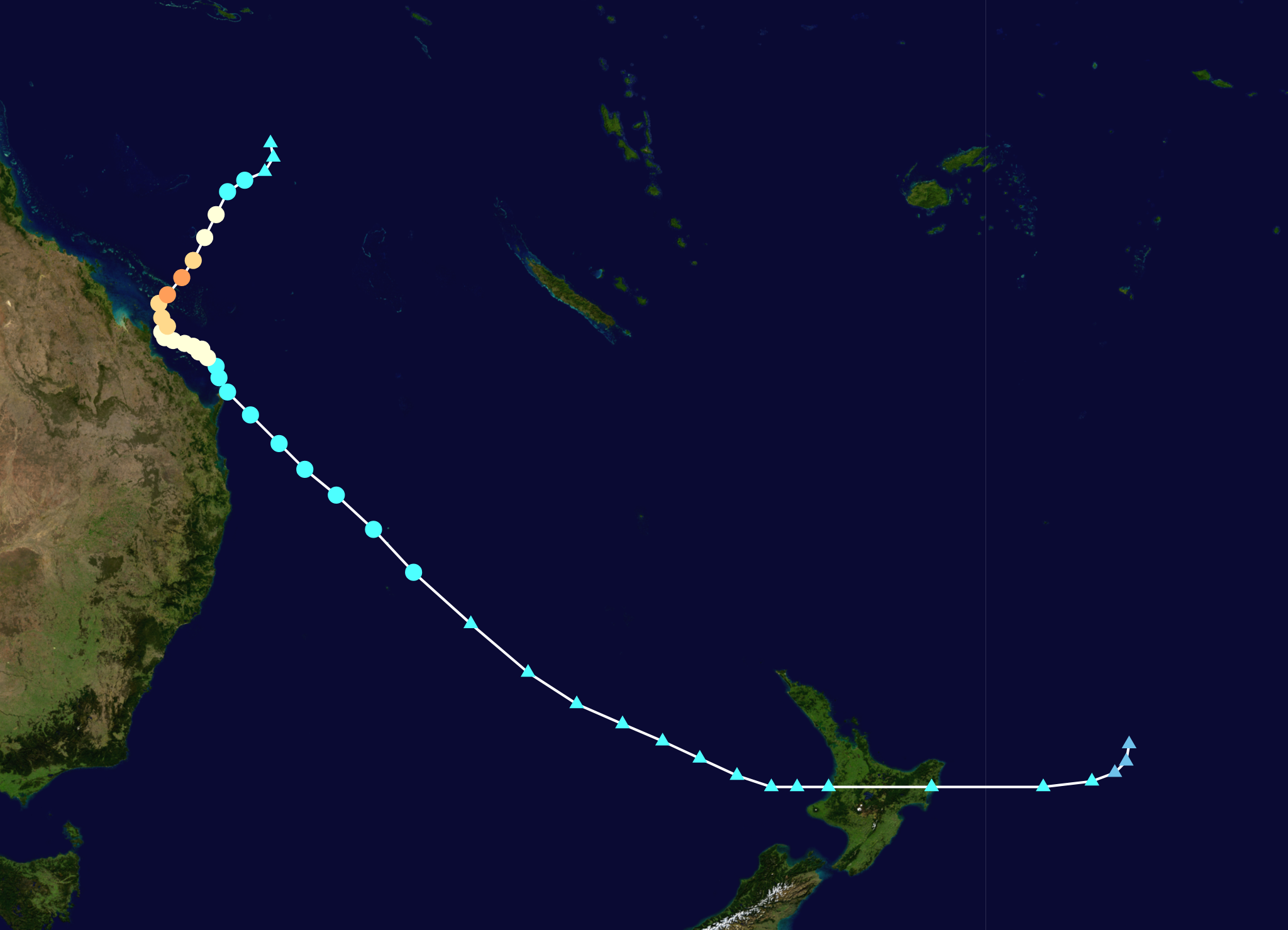
- Duration: February 28 (Crossed 160°E) – March 3
- Peak intensity: 95 km/h (60 mph) (10-min); 950 hPa (mbar)

Cyclone Simon entered the basin on February 28, making landfall in New Zealand as a tropical storm before dissipating on March 3.

=== Severe Tropical Cyclone Sina ===
- Category 3 severe tropical cyclone (Australian scale)
- Category 1 tropical cyclone (SSHWS)
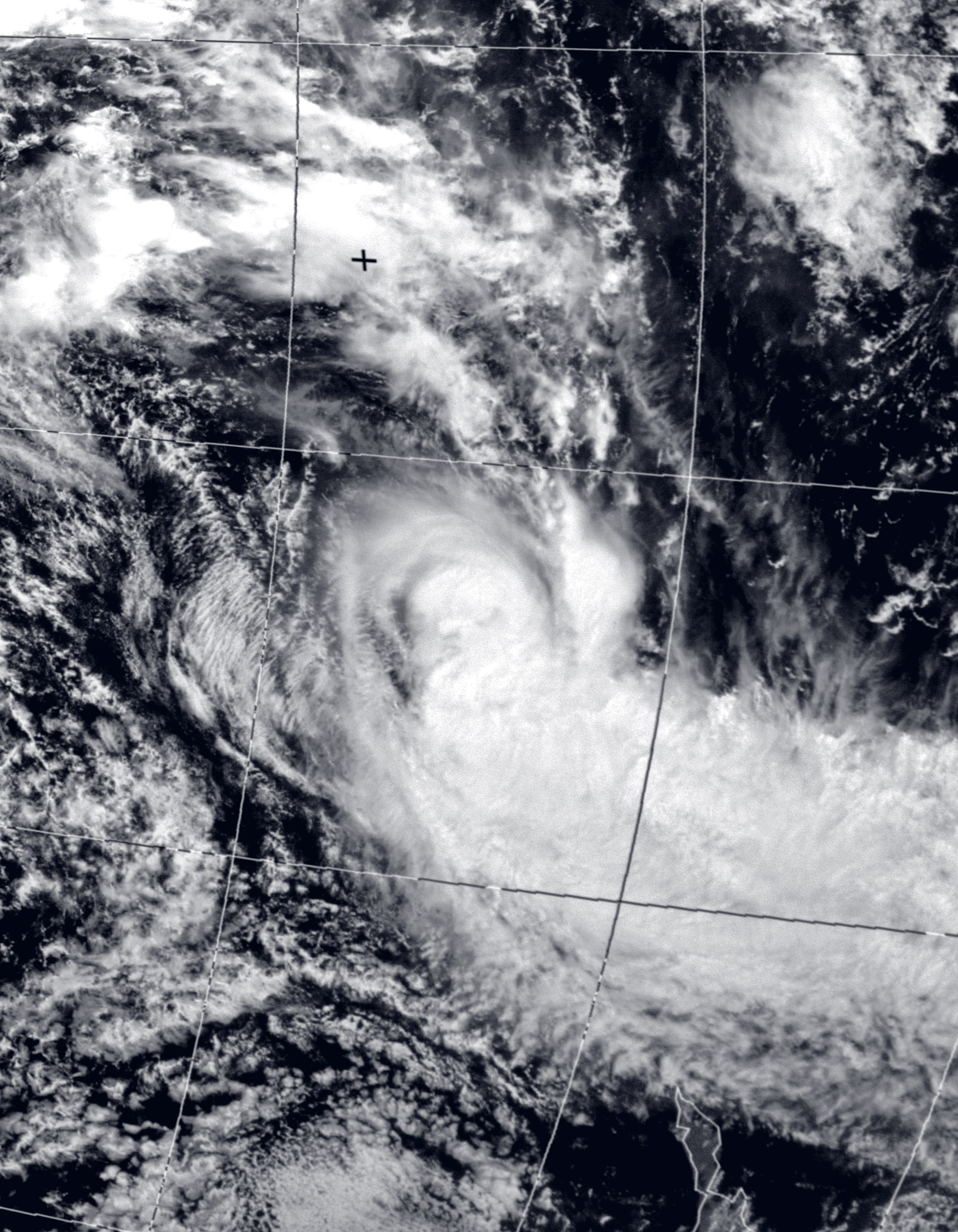
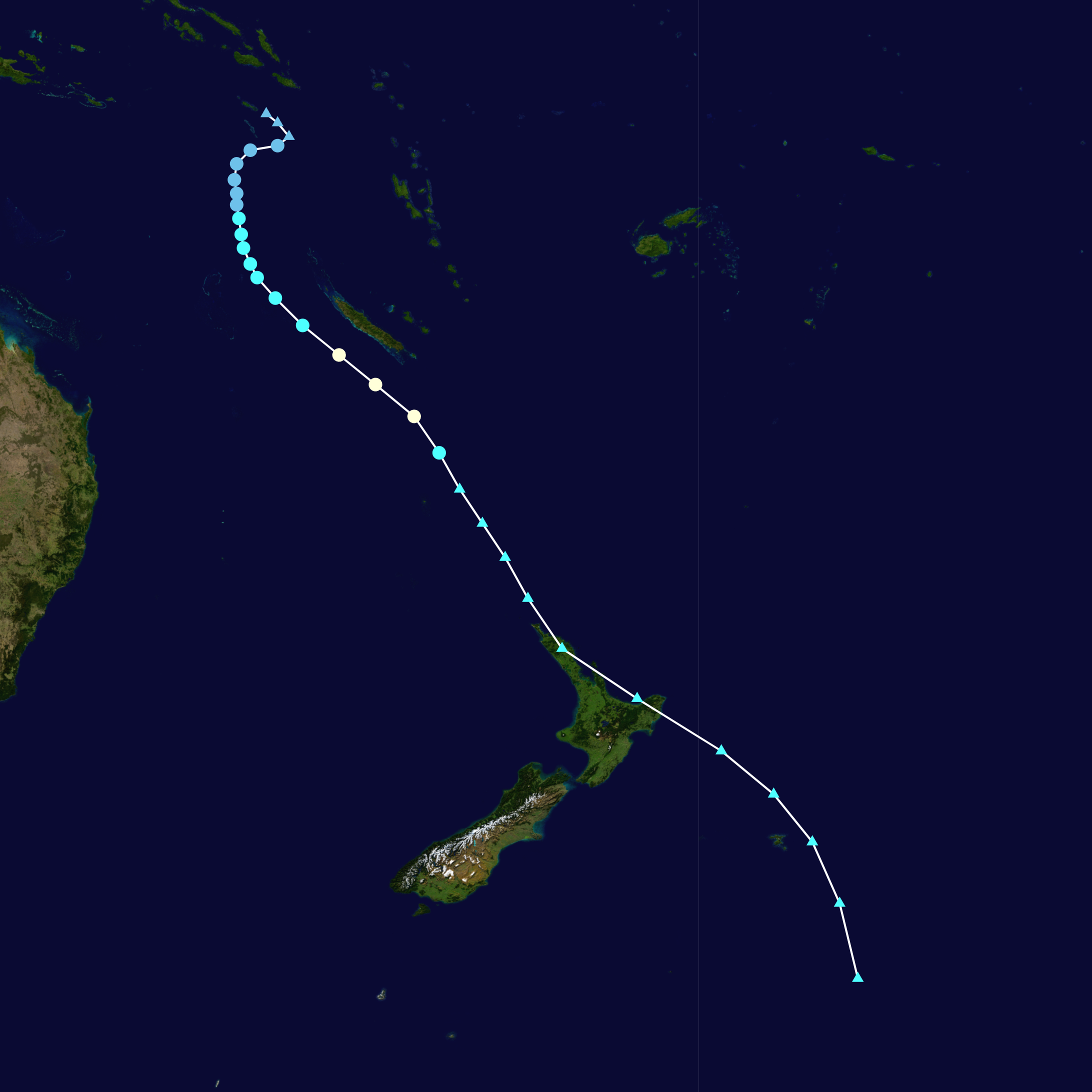
- Duration: March 11 (Entered basin) – March 16
- Peak intensity: 120 km/h (75 mph) (10-min); 970 hPa (mbar)

During the opening days of March 1980, a broad trough of low pressure, extended from Vanuatu to Queensland, Australia. A tropical depression subsequently developed, along this trough during March 9, near Rennell Island in the Solomon Islands. Over the next few days the system initially moved south-eastwards into the Australian region, as it gradually developed further before it turned south-westwards towards the South Pacific during March 10. The Australian Bureau of Meteorology, subsequently reported that the depression, had developed into a tropical cyclone and named it Sina during March 11. The system subsequently moved south-eastwards and back into the South Pacific basin, where it continued to intensify and move south-eastwards. During March 13, the system peaked as a Category 3 severe tropical cyclone with 10-minute sustained wind speeds estimated at 120 km/h (75 mph), as it passed about 200 km (125 mi) to the southwest of New Caledonia. After the system had peaked, it accelerated south-eastwards while gradually weakened and transitioning into a cold cored low. The system impacted northern New Zealand during March 15, before it was last noted during the following day.

=== Tropical Cyclone Tia ===
- Category 2 tropical cyclone (Australian scale)
- Tropical storm (SSHWS)
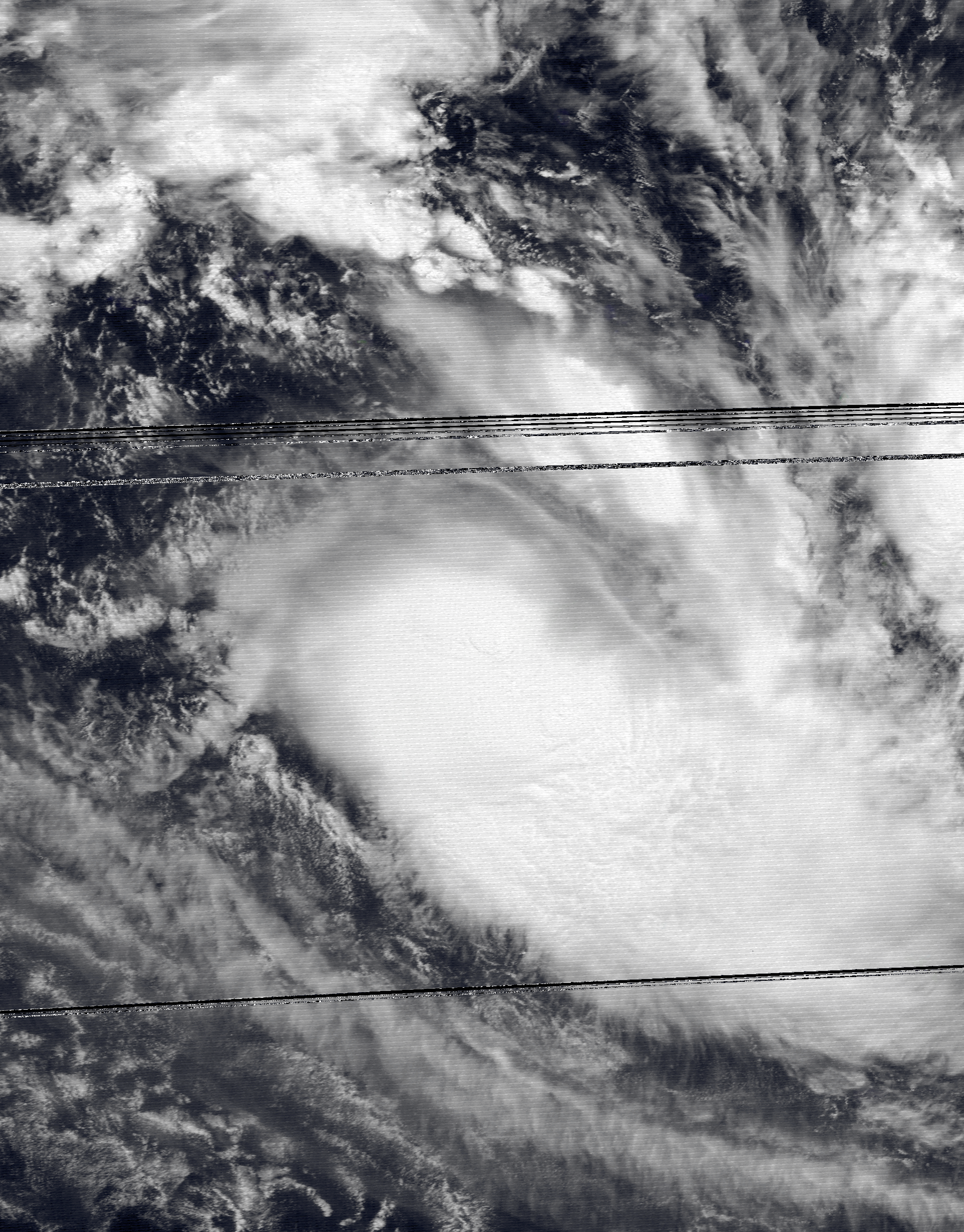
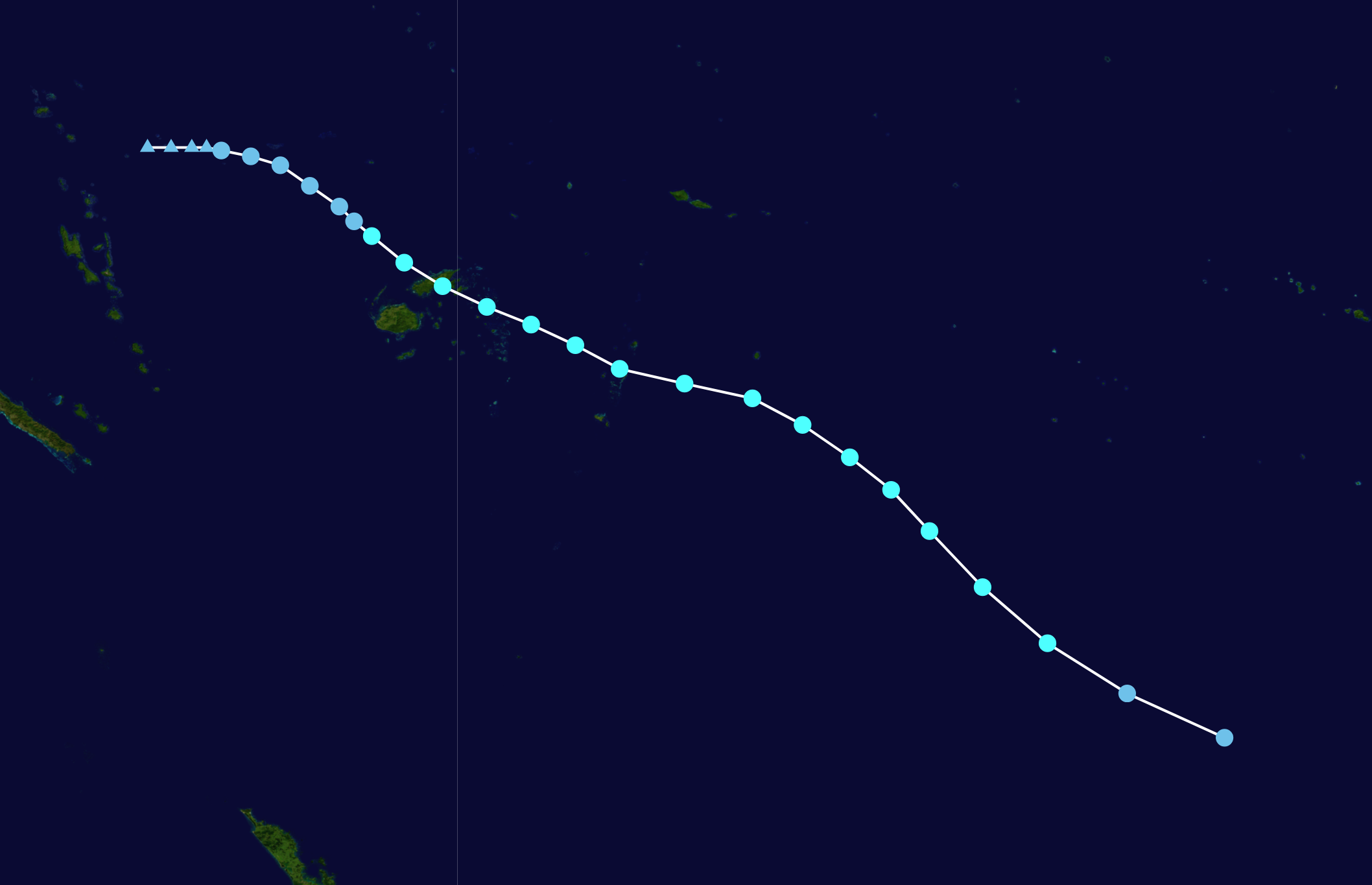
- Duration: March 22 – March 27
- Peak intensity: 100 km/h (65 mph) (10-min); 980 hPa (mbar)

Tia affected Fiji and Tonga.

=== Tropical Cyclone Val ===
- Category 2 tropical cyclone (Australian scale)
- Tropical storm (SSHWS)
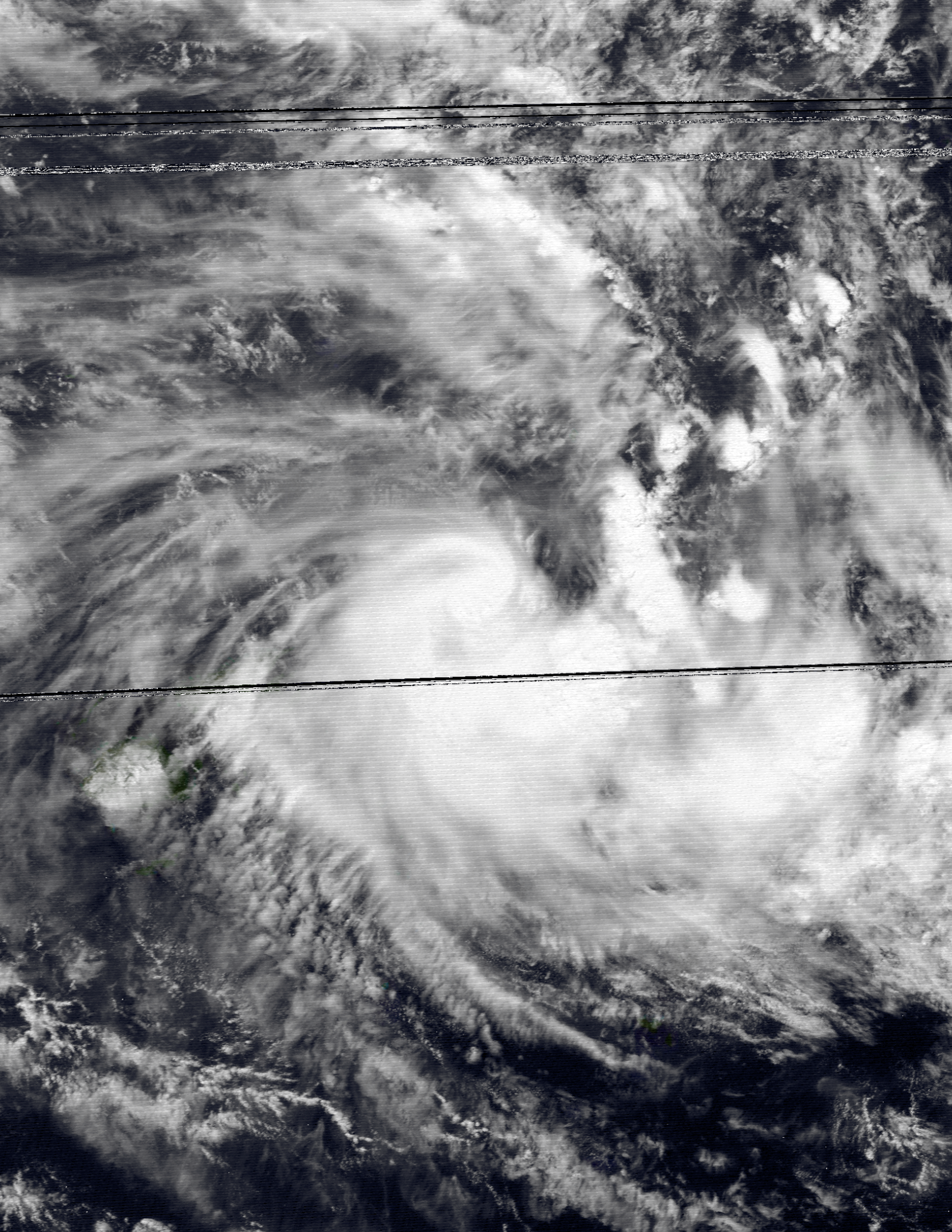
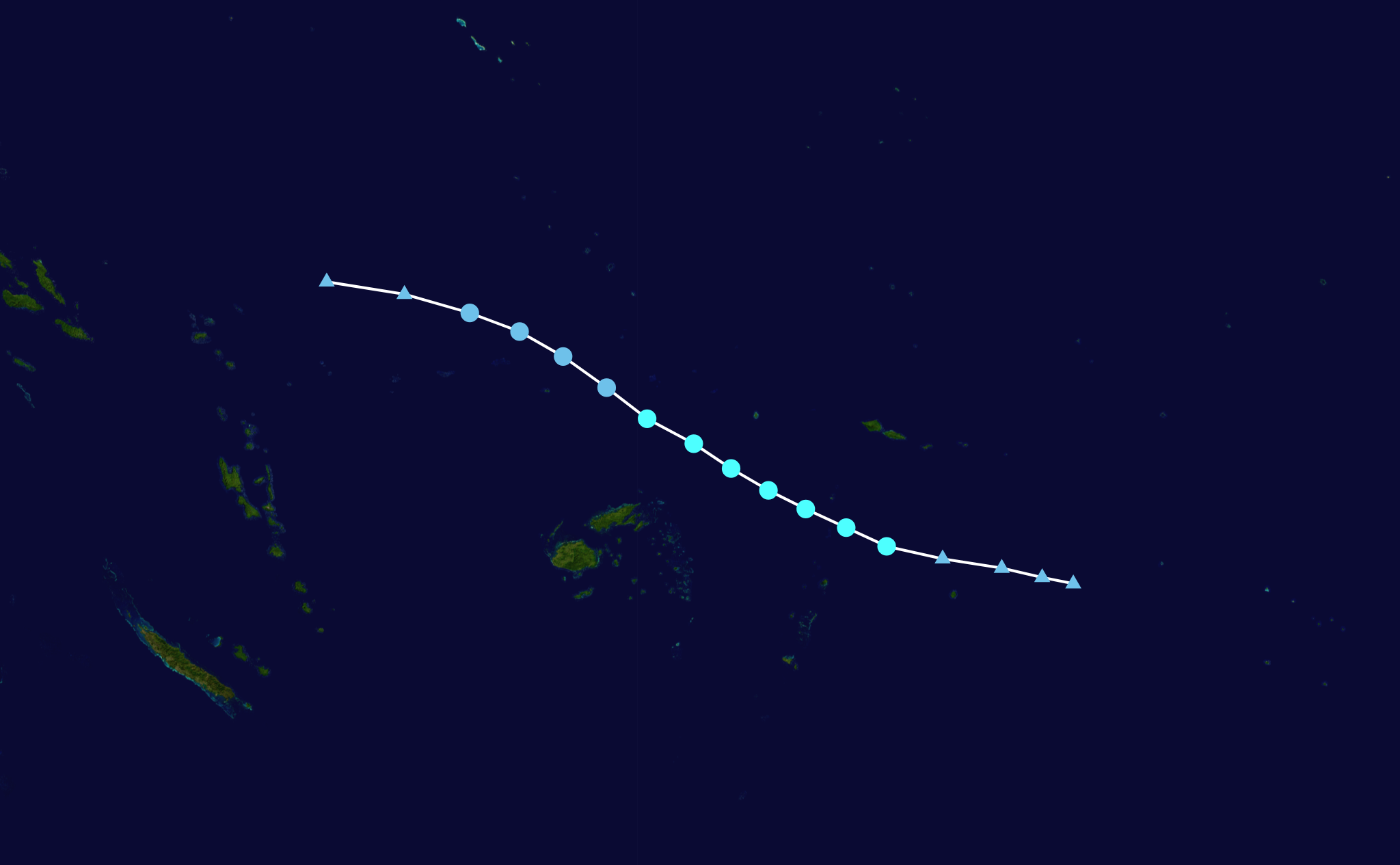
- Duration: March 25 – March 28
- Peak intensity: 100 km/h (65 mph) (10-min); 980 hPa (mbar)

Val affected Wallis and Futuna between March 25–29.

=== Tropical Cyclone Wally ===
- Category 1 tropical cyclone (Australian scale)
- Tropical storm (SSHWS)
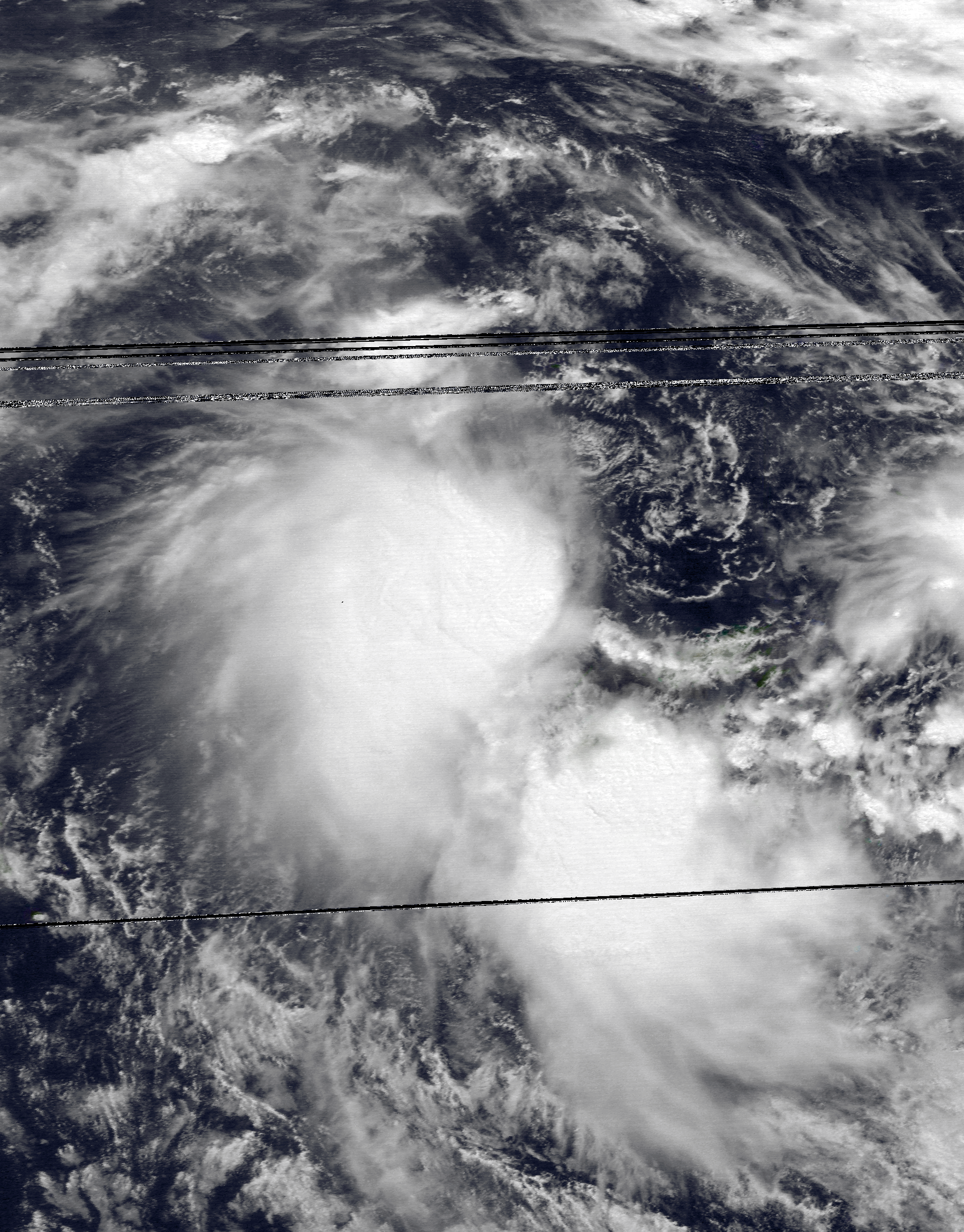
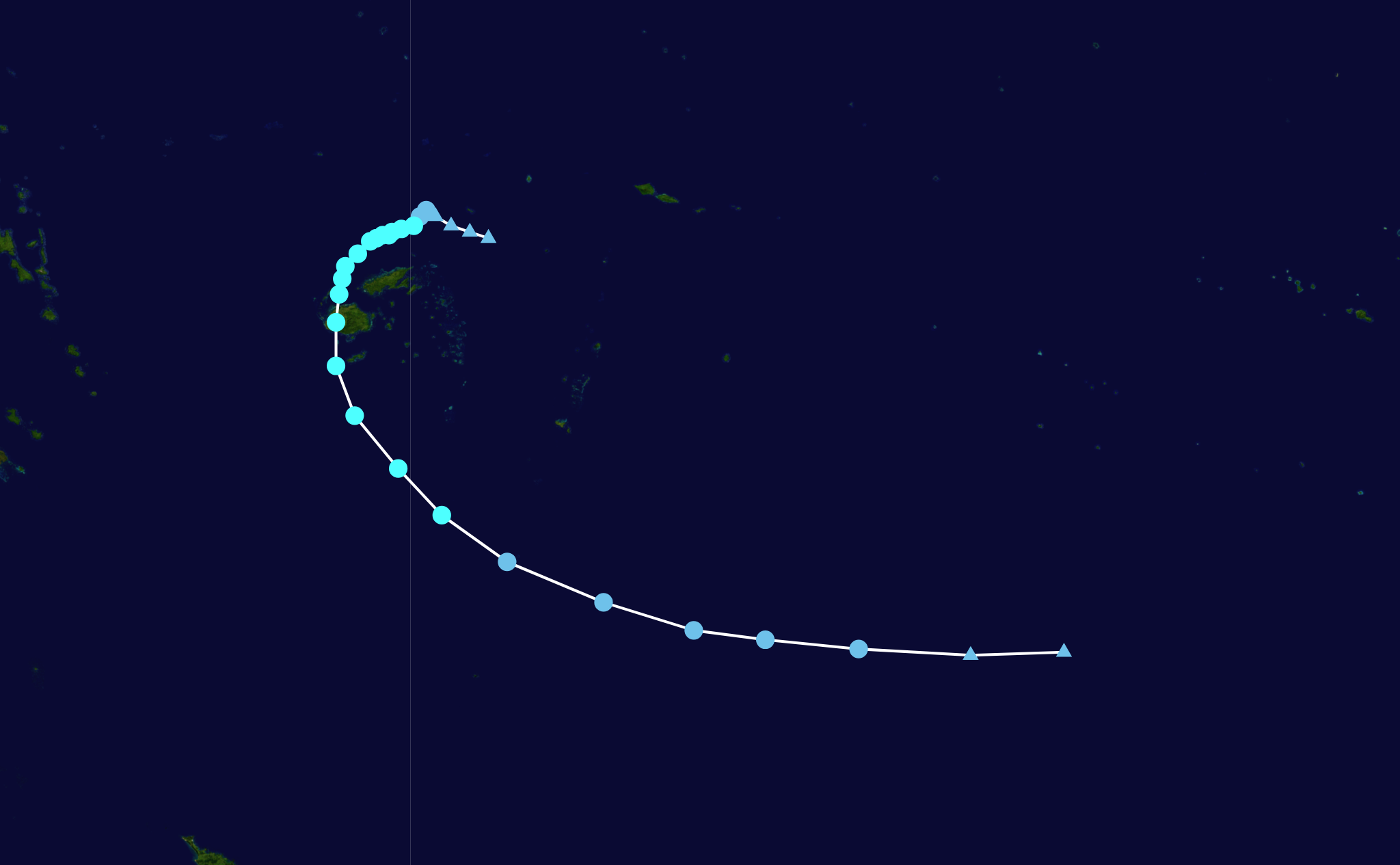
- Duration: April 1 – April 8
- Peak intensity: 65 km/h (40 mph) (10-min); 995 hPa (mbar)

Wally lasted in the southern Pacific from April 1 to 7 and was a category one cyclone on the Australian tropical cyclone intensity scale with a peak pressure of 990 HpA/mbar. During its lifetime it made landfall on the second biggest island of Fiji – Viti Levu.

=== Other systems ===
During January 9, the extratropical remnants of Tropical Cyclone Paul briefly moved into the region, before they moved back into the Australian region during the next day. The remnants subsequently moved back into the region during January 12, when they were last noted to the south of New Zealand's South Island. The precursor tropical depression to Severe Tropical Cyclone Simon, developed within the monsoon trough, to the northeast of New Caledonia during February 20. Over the next day the system moved eastwards and into the Australian region, where it ultimately developed into a severe tropical cyclone and impacted Queensland. During February 28, Simon's extratropical remnants moved back into the basin and impacted New Zealand, before they were last noted during March 3.

== Season effects ==
This table lists all the storms that developed in the South Pacific to the east of longitude 160°E during the 1979–80 season. It includes their intensity on the Australian tropical cyclone intensity scale, duration, name, landfalls, deaths, and damages. All data is taken from the archives of the Fiji Meteorological Service and MetService, and all of the damage figures are in 1980 USD.

Name	Dates	Peak intensity			Areas affected	Damage (USD)	Deaths	Ref(s).
Name	Dates	Category	Wind speed	Pressure	Areas affected	Damage (USD)	Deaths	Ref(s).
Ofa	December 9 – 15	Category 2 tropical cyclone	100 km/h (65 mph)	980 hPa (28.94 inHg)	Wallis and Futuna			
Peni	January 1 – 6	Category 3 severe tropical cyclone	120 km/h (75 mph)	970 hPa (28.64 inHg)	Fiji	Minor		
Rae	February 2 - 5	Category 1 tropical cyclone	75 km/h (45 mph)	990 hPa (29.23 inHg)	Vanuatu			
Sina	March 11 - 16	Category 3 severe tropical cyclone	120 km/h (75 mph)	970 hPa (28.64 inHg)	New Caledonia, New Zealand			
Tia	March 21 - 27	Category 2 tropical cyclone	100 km/h (65 mph)	980 hPa (28.94 inHg)	Fiji	Moderate	4	
Val	March 25 - 28	Category 2 tropical cyclone	100 km/h (65 mph)	980 hPa (28.94 inHg)				
Wally	April 1 – 8	Category 1 tropical cyclone	65 km/h (40 mph)	995 hPa (29.38 inHg)	Fiji	$2.26 million	18	
Season aggregates
10 systems	December 9, 1980 – April 8, 1981		120 km/h (75 mph)	970 hPa (28.64 inHg)				

== See also ==
- Atlantic hurricane seasons: 1979, 1980
- Eastern Pacific hurricane seasons: 1979, 1980
- Western Pacific typhoon seasons: 1979, 1980
- North Indian Ocean cyclone seasons: 1979, 1980
