= Typhoon Prapiroon (2000) =

Pacific typhoon in 2000

Typhoon Prapiroon (Lusing)
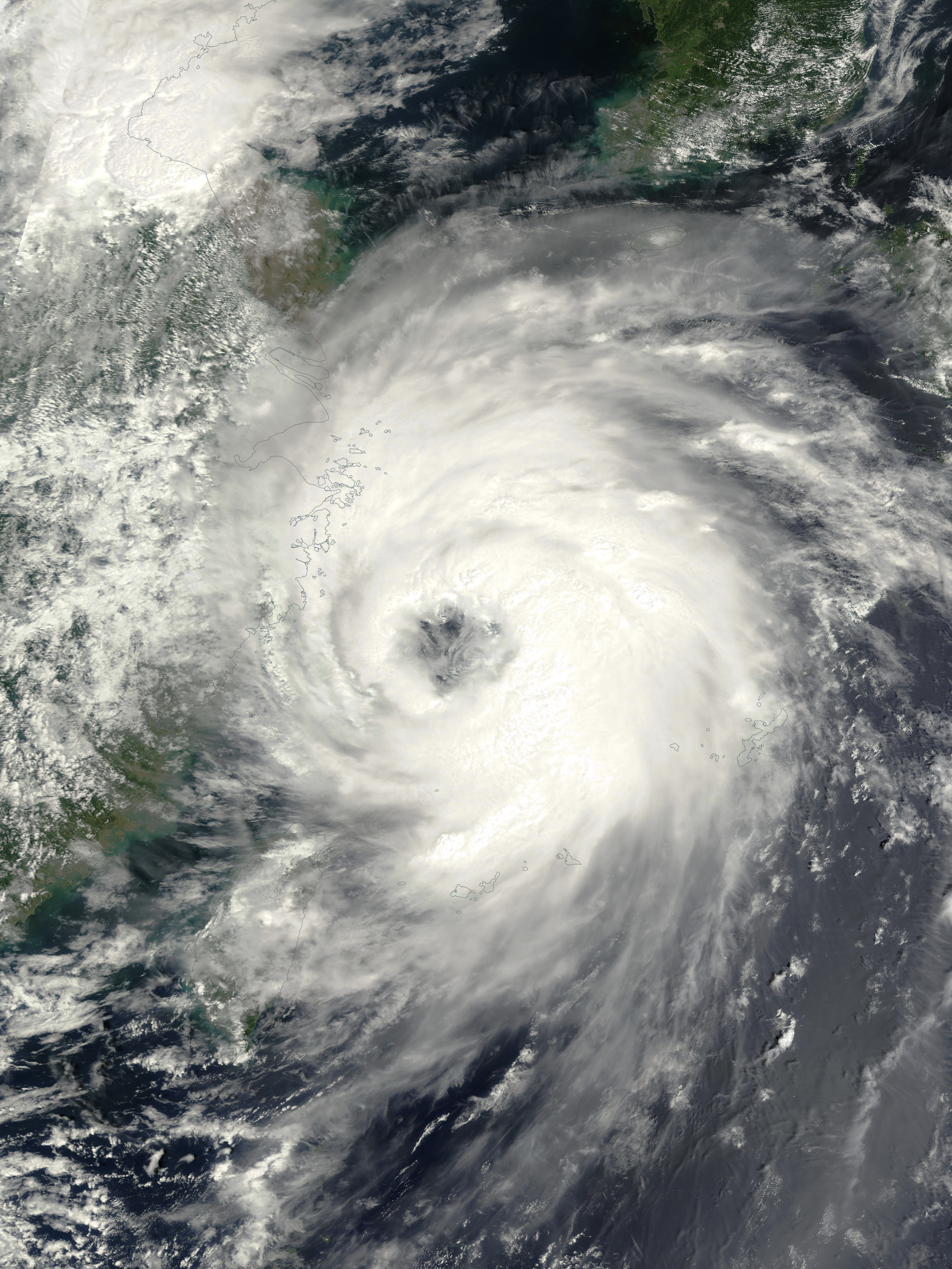
- Prapiroon prior to peak strength on August 30

Meteorological history
- Formed: August 24, 2000
- Extratropical: September 1, 2000
- Dissipated: September 4, 2000

Typhoon
- 10-minute sustained (JMA)
- Highest winds: 140 km/h (85 mph)
- Lowest pressure: 965 hPa (mbar); 28.50 inHg

Category 1-equivalent typhoon
- 1-minute sustained (SSHWS/JTWC)
- Highest winds: 130 km/h (80 mph)

Overall effects
- Fatalities: 75 total
- Damage: $6.14 billion (2000 USD)
- Areas affected: Japan; Taiwan; China; Korea
- IBTrACS
- Part of the 2000 Pacific typhoon season

Typhoon Prapiroon, (Note: The name Prapiroon (Thai: พระพิรุณ, [pʰraʔ˦˥ pʰi˦˥(ʔ) run˧]) was contributed by Thailand and refers to Varuna, a Hindu god of sea and rain, in Thai.) known in the Philippines as Typhoon Lusing, was the costliest tropical cyclone to strike the Korean Peninsula and at the time the tenth costliest in the West Pacific on record.

Prapiroon developed as a tropical depression on August 24, 2000, and took a primarily northerly course for much of its duration. However, steering currents caused it to track westward for extended periods of time on two occasions. Intensification was gradual, and on August 26 the system reached tropical storm status, though the system's organization remained rather loose for much of its early developmental history. On August 29, Prapiroon swung near Taiwan and East China as it tracked about the western periphery of a nearby high-pressure area. A day later, the storm reached typhoon intensity within the East China Sea, later attaining peak intensity as a typhoon of moderate strength within the Yellow Sea. On August 31, a slightly weakened Prapiroon made landfall in North Korea and quickly tracked across the Korean Peninsula, before transitioning into an extratropical cyclone in the Sea of Japan on September 1; the system dissipated east of Hokkaido three days later.

== Meteorological history ==
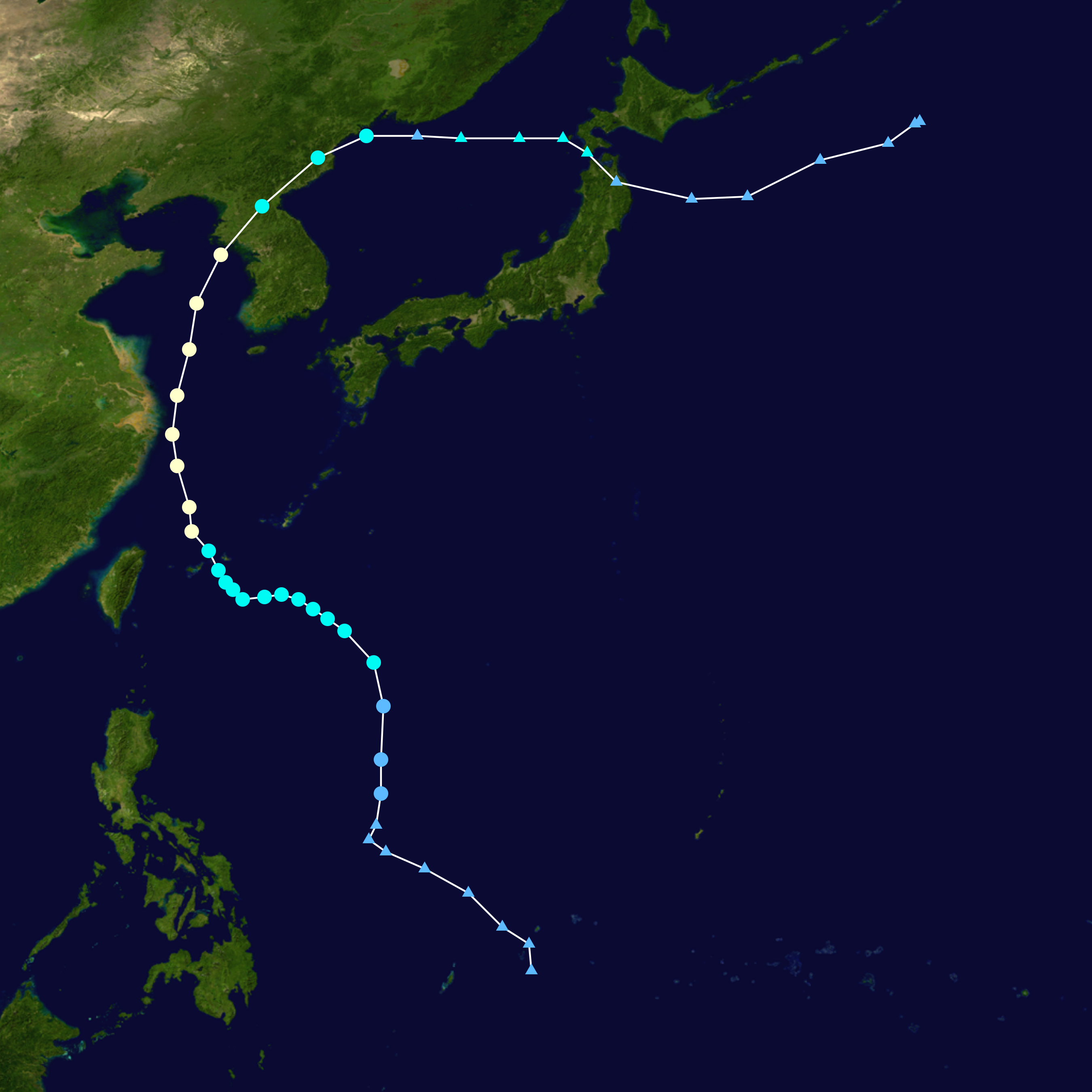
Map plotting the storm's track and intensity, according to the Saffir–Simpson scale Map key Saffir–Simpson scale Tropical depression (≤38 mph, ≤62 km/h) Tropical storm (39–73 mph, 63–118 km/h) Category 1 (74–95 mph, 119–153 km/h) Category 2 (96–110 mph, 154–177 km/h) Category 3 (111–129 mph, 178–208 km/h) Category 4 (130–156 mph, 209–251 km/h) Category 5 (≥157 mph, ≥252 km/h) Unknown Storm type Tropical cyclone Subtropical cyclone Extratropical cyclone, remnant low, tropical disturbance, or monsoon depression

Prapiroon originated from a disturbance that developed within the warm tropics southeast of Guam on August 22. Positioned in an area with low wind shear, atmospheric conditions around the system were supportive of tropical cyclone development. After some organization, the Japan Meteorological Agency (JMA) declared the area of disturbed weather to have assumed the characteristics of a tropical depression at 1800 UTC on August 24. Initially tracking westward, the diffuse depression reached a temporary halt and later began to accelerate towards the north on August 25. Strengthening continued at a steady pace thereafter, and at 1800 UTC the following day, the JMA upgraded the depression to tropical storm status, based on corresponding ship reports and satellite intensity estimates, and named the system Prapiroon accordingly. Despite its classification, Prapiroon was loosely defined, as it lacked a primary circulation center and instead was centered around multiple vortices.

In response to steering wind currents induced by a nearby, strengthening high-pressure area, Prapiroon began to take a more westerly course beginning late on August 27. Around the same time, the JMA upgraded the cyclone further to severe tropical status, a classification Prapiroon would maintain for much of its existence. Despite consolidation of the previously distinct low-level circulation vortices, moderate wind shear displaced the newly merged center from much of its associated convection. However, the storm's overall structure would improve over the following days as Prapiroon began to curve northward around the western periphery of the nearby high pressure region. Late on August 29, Prapiroon made its closest approach to Taipei, Taiwan, at a distance of 260 km (160 mi). At around the same time, satellite imagery indicated the development of a large, albeit ragged eye.

Having resumed a northerly course, the recent strengthening trend prompted the JMA to classify Prapiroon as a typhoon at 0600 UTC on August 30. Roughly six hours later, the typhoon peaked in strength, with maximum sustained winds reaching 130 km/h (81 mph) and a barometric pressure bottoming out at 965 mbar (hPa; 28.50 inHg). This intensity was held for at least the following 18 hours before Prapiroon's cloud structure began to elongate as the storm accelerated into more northerly latitudes, where wind shear was increased. Prapiroon was downgraded back to severe tropical storm intensity shortly before it made landfall on the western coast of North Korea at 1300 UTC on August 31. Although Prapiroon crossed the Korean Peninsula at a rapid pace, upon emerging into the Sea of Japan early on September 1, its interaction of land had caused the majority of its convection to deteriorate. At 1200 UTC that day, the JMA analyzed Prapiroon to have transitioned into an extratropical cyclone. These remnants tracked quickly eastward, crossing Japan on September 2 before dissipating in the open Pacific east of Hokkaido on September 4.

== Preparations and impact ==
=== Taiwan and China ===
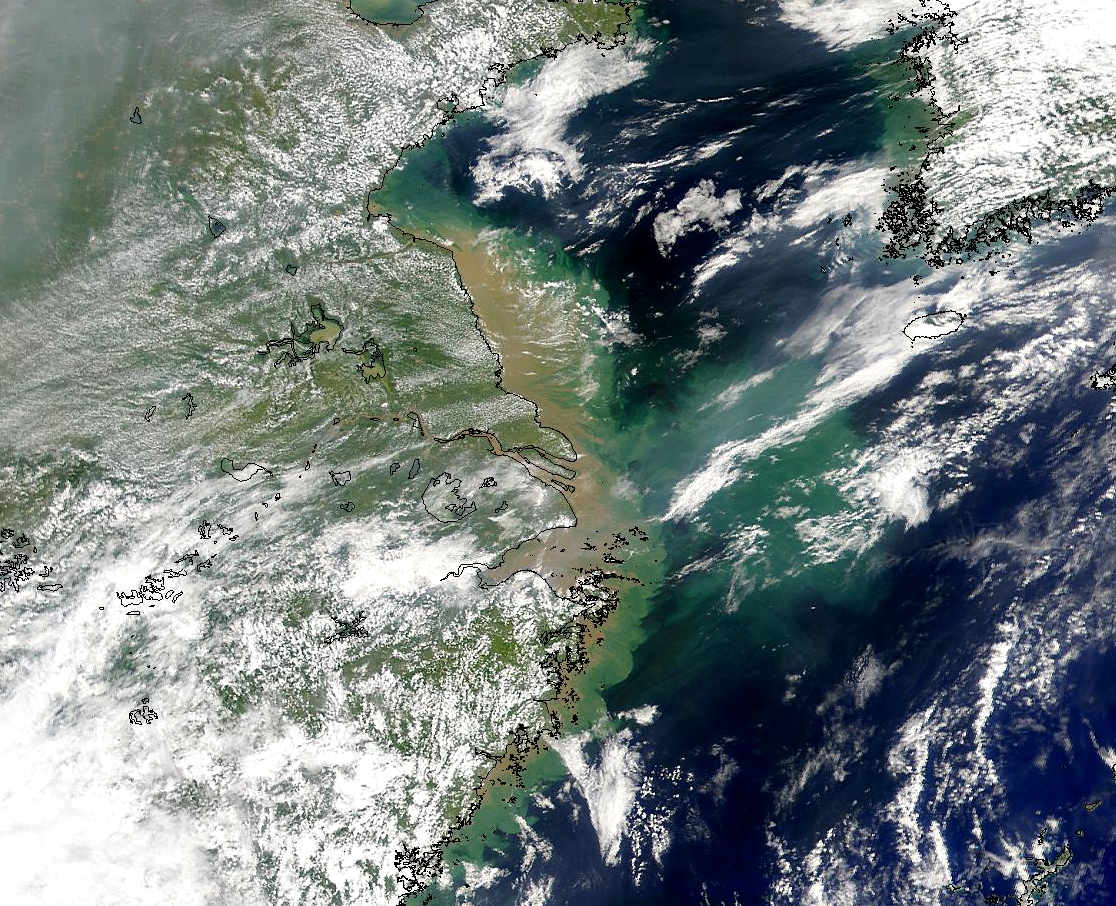
Sedimentation off the eastern coast of China caused by Typhoon Prapiroon

The Taiwanese Central Weather Bureau issued warnings for ships in the vicinity of Taiwan's northern and eastern shores on August 28 as Prapiroon approached the island. Forecasts anticipated the tropical cyclone to track northeast of the island. Schools in Yilan and Keelung were temporarily closed on August 29 due to the storm. In Chongming Island near Shanghai, evacuation procedures were initiated, resulting in the displacement of approximately 3,000 people. Both Huangpu River and Suzhou Creek, which flowed nearby, were predicted to reach their second highest crests in recorded history as a result of the nearby Prapiroon. More than 100 flights departing or arriving at Shanghai Pudong International Airport and Shanghai Hongqiao International Airport were either delayed or cancelled. Nearby ships were brought into temporary confinement in the Port of Shanghai.

The outer rainbands of Prapiroon disrupted traffic and caused landslides in Taiwan, though effects were mostly of minimal extent. Storm surge associated with the typhoon coincided with the astronomical high tide along the coast of Mainland China, inundating large swaths of farmland and destroying thousands of homes. Floodwaters breached dykes in Shanghai's Baoshan and Chongming Island. Additional dyke breaching in several other districts in Shanghai forced the evacuation of 10,000 people. The provinces of Jiangsu and Zhejiang were the worst affected. In northern Jiangsu, four people were killed and 80 others were injured. The same region experienced severe flooding, resulting in the submerging of 364,000 hectares (900,000 acres) of farmland and the destruction of over 7,500 homes. In Xiangshui County, 821 mm (32.3 in) of rain was reported, setting a county record for the most observed precipitation from a single rain event. The floods there prompted the evacuation of 13,800 people. The prefecture government in Yancheng allocated 400 soldiers and militiamen, along with 30,000 life jackets and various supplies, in order to combat the flood. Flood-relief channels in Shiliang Reservoir were opened in order to relieve the high water levels. In total, Prapiroon was responsible for the deaths of 10 people across China.

=== Korea ===
Prapiroon impacted North Korea with winds and rains for 27 hours, damaging houses and infrastructure. The most severe damage was in North Hamgyong Province and South Hamgyong Province. As of 27 September 2000, 46 people have been reported dead.

=== Japan ===
As a tropical storm, Prapiroon brought strong winds and rain to Okinawa Prefecture and the rest of the Ryukyu Islands. Precipitation totals peaked at 190 mm (7.5 in) in Ohara. However, daily rainfall totals peaked at 94 mm (3.7 in) on Ishigaki Island. Due to the effects of the nearby tropical cyclone, several warnings were issued for the prefecture, and sea and air transportation was suspended. On Ishigaki, Prapiroon was particularly damaging to crops, including sugarcane, papaya, and banana. Around 12.3 km^{2} (4.7 mi^{2}) of farmland was reportedly damaged, and total costs of agricultural damage reached JP¥25.8 million (US$239 thousand). In addition to crops, Prapiroon also caused adverse effects to several schools, including the shattering of several windows at a junior high school. More widespread and severe damage occurred in Okinawa's Miyako District, where damage to agriculture amounted to JP¥105 million (US$974 thousand). Power outages were also widespread, impacting 400 households. Telecommunications were also disrupted as a result.

Outside of its claims in the Ryukyu Islands, Japan remained largely unaffected by Prapiroon until the system passed over Honshu as an extratropical cyclone. Similar to its affects in the Ryukyu Islands, the storm mainly caused heavy rain, with rainfall totals peaking nationally in Nakagoya, Miyazaki Prefecture, where a station measured 253 mm (10.0 in) of precipitation. In Kyoto Prefecture, the rainfall resulted in the inundation of 39 buildings and the flooding of roads. Kōchi Prefecture, located further northeast, experienced similar impacts, in addition to the occurrence of six landslides. Accrued damage amounted to JP¥419 million (US$3.89 million). Strong waves off of Niigata Prefecture damaged 22 vessels and submerged coastal regions. Particularly impacted was Hokkaido, which was affected by high surf and heavy rains, delaying domestic flights and causing complications for rail service. Automobile transportation was also impacted as heavy rains rendered roads impassable. Flooding occurred after rivers began to overflow their banks, including in Horokanai. Damage to agriculture in Hokkaido reached JP¥35.7 million (US$331 thousand).

== See also ==
- Weather of 2000
- Tropical cyclones in 2000
- Typhoon Rusa (2002)
- Typhoon Kompasu (2010)
- Typhoon Muifa (2011)
- Tropical Storm Khanun (2012)
- Typhoon Lingling (2019)
- Typhoon Bavi (2020)
- Typhoon Hinnamnor (2022)
- Typhoon Khanun (2023)
