= List of storms named Cimaron =

The name Cimaron (Filipino: simaron/simarón, [si.mɐ.ɾo̞n]) has been used for five tropical cyclones in the western North Pacific Ocean. The name was contributed by the Philippines and means "wild, feral, untamed, or untamable" in Filipino, and is originally from the Spanish word "cimarrón".

- Severe Tropical Storm Cimaron (2001) (T0101, 03W, Crising) – affected the Philippines and Taiwan
- Typhoon Cimaron (2006) (T0619, 22W, Paeng) – a Category 5 typhoon that struck the Philippines, causing several deaths
- Tropical Storm Cimaron (2013) (T1308, 08W, Isang) – struck the Philippines and China.
- Typhoon Cimaron (2018) (T1820, 23W) – a Category 4 typhoon that struck Japan as a weakening typhoon.
- Tropical Storm Cimaron (2024) (T2416, 18W) – a weak storm that loitered off the Southern coast of Japan.

Preceded by Soulik	Pacific typhoon season names Cimaron	Succeeded by Narae
