= Typhoon Cimaron (2018) =

Pacific typhoon in 2018

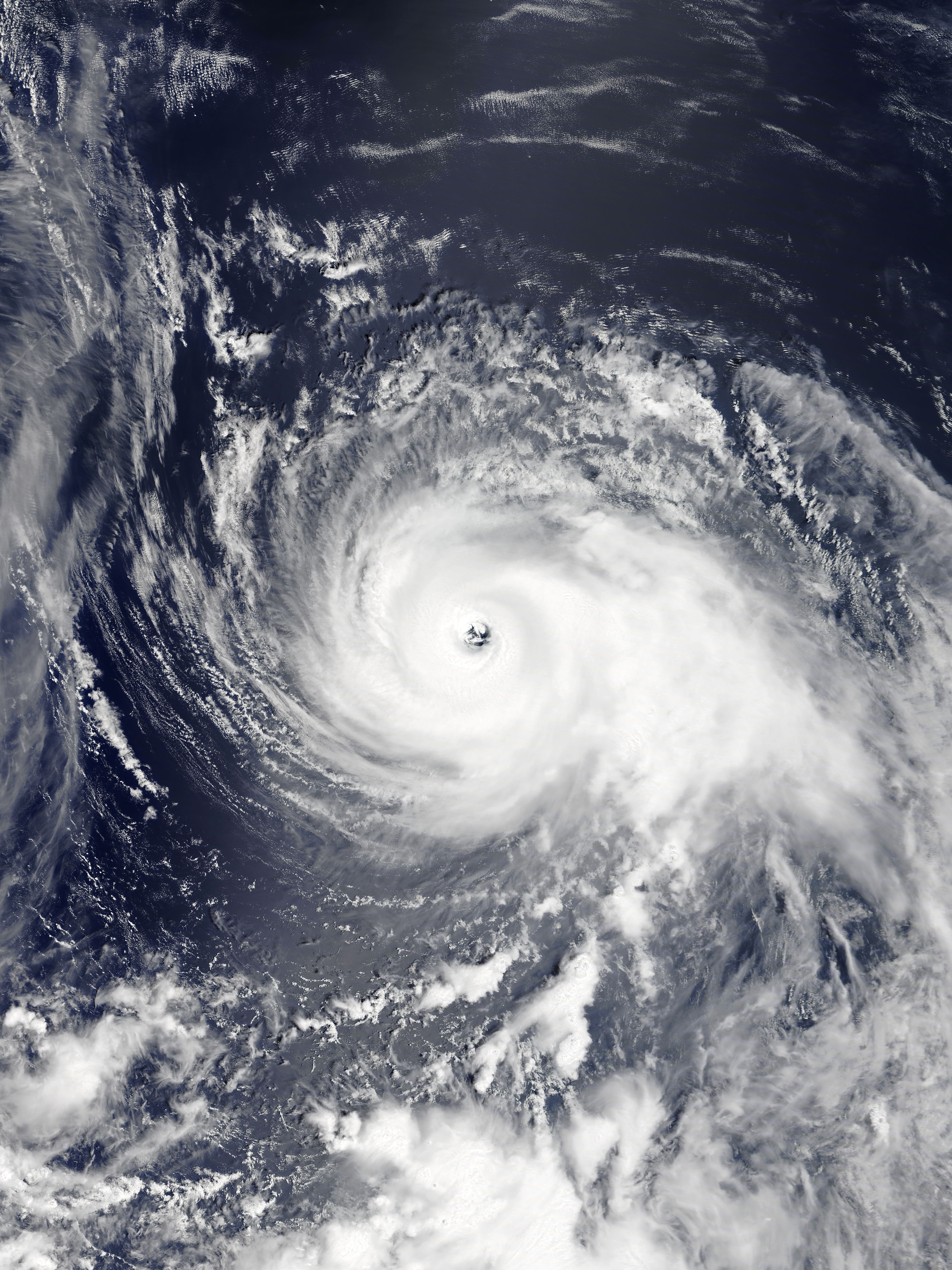
- Typhoon Cimaron at peak intensity near Iwo To on August 22

Meteorological history
- Formed: August 16, 2018
- Extratropical: August 24, 2018
- Dissipated: August 24, 2018

Very strong typhoon
- 10-minute sustained (JMA)
- Highest winds: 155 km/h (100 mph)
- Lowest pressure: 950 hPa (mbar); 28.05 inHg

Category 4-equivalent typhoon
- 1-minute sustained (SSHWS/JTWC)
- Highest winds: 215 km/h (130 mph)
- Lowest pressure: 936 hPa (mbar); 27.64 inHg

Overall effects
- Fatalities: 3 total
- Damage: $30.6 million (2018 USD)
- Areas affected: Marshall Islands, Mariana Islands, Japan, Russian Far East, Alaska
- IBTrACS
- Part of the 2018 Pacific typhoon season

Typhoon Cimaron (Note: The name Cimaron (Tagalog: cimaron, [simɐɾo̞n]) was contributed by the Philippines and means "to be wild, ferocious" in Tagalog.) was a typhoon that caused minimal impacts in the Mariana Islands and Japan in mid-August 2018. The twenty-third depression, twenty-first named storm, eleventh severe tropical storm, and seventh typhoon of the 2018 Pacific typhoon season, Cimaron developed from a tropical depression near the Marshall Islands on August 16. The depression soon became Tropical Storm Cimaron on August 18. Cimaron gradually intensified into a typhoon on August 21, and rapidly reached its peak intensity the next day. Cimaron then weakened before making two landfalls in Japan as a Category 1 typhoon on August 23. Cimaron continued to weaken until it became an extratropical cyclone and dissipated on August 24.

Cimaron brought flash flooding to the Mariana Islands, namely Saipan. The storm then hit southern Japan as a Category 1 typhoon causing major travel disruptions along with minimal structural damage. About 33 people were injured and 3 people swept out to sea died. Agricultural damage in the country totaled JP¥3.41 billion (US$30.6 million). However, this damage was soon overshadowed by Typhoon Jebi nearly two weeks later.

== Meteorological history ==
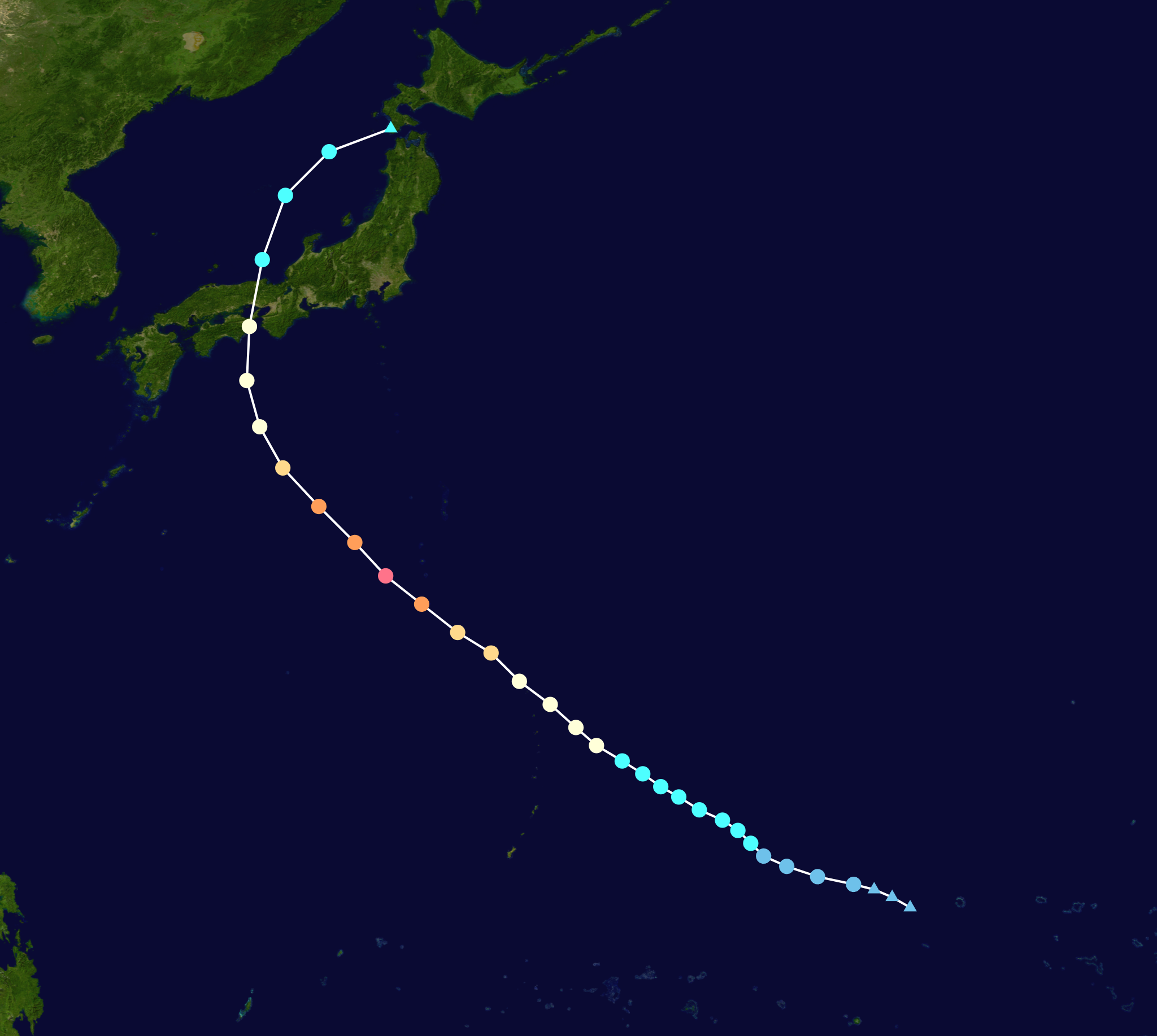
Map plotting the storm's track and intensity, according to the Saffir–Simpson scale Map key Saffir–Simpson scale Tropical depression (≤38 mph, ≤62 km/h) Tropical storm (39–73 mph, 63–118 km/h) Category 1 (74–95 mph, 119–153 km/h) Category 2 (96–110 mph, 154–177 km/h) Category 3 (111–129 mph, 178–208 km/h) Category 4 (130–156 mph, 209–251 km/h) Category 5 (≥157 mph, ≥252 km/h) Unknown Storm type Tropical cyclone Subtropical cyclone Extratropical cyclone, remnant low, tropical disturbance, or monsoon depression

At 12:00 UTC on August 16, 2018, a tropical depression formed near the Marshall Islands according to the JMA. The depression gradually intensified, with the JMA upgraded it into a tropical storm by 12:00 UTC on August 18, while located north of Chuuk. That same day, the JTWC began to monitor the system as a tropical depression, giving it the tag 23W. On August 20, the JTWC began to note that the storm was growing banding features around an exposed center. Cimaron turned northwestward as it became a Category 1 typhoon on August 21. As it did so, thunderstorms began to spiral through the center. The storm strengthened into a Category 2 typhoon at 18:00 UTC that day, and a Category 3 typhoon, just a few hours later. Cimaron then quickly intensified into a Category 4 typhoon as it reached its peak intensity with 1-minute sustained winds of 130 mph (210 km/h) and a barometric pressure of 950 mbar (28 inHg) at 6:00 UTC the next day, while located west of the Ogasawara Islands.

Soon, Cimaron shifted northward and began weakening. The storm had weakened into a Category 1 typhoon as it made its first landfall in the southern portion of Tokushima Prefecture, Japan, at 12:00 UTC then a second landfall in Himeji, Hyogo Prefecture around 14:30 UTC on August 23. Cimaron continued weakening as it turned north-northeastward, transitioning into an extratropical cyclone over the Sea of Japan at 12:00 UTC on August 24. Just 6 hours later, the extratropical remnants dissipated.

== Preparations and impact ==
Cimaron caused heavy rainfall and flash flooding in the Mariana Islands, namely on Saipan. Cimaron then moved across southern Japan as a Category 1 typhoon bringing major travel disruptions, widespread power outages, and numerous injuries. Agricultural damage in Japan reached JP¥3.41 billion (US$30.6 million). Cimaron was the 12th typhoon to make landfall in Japan during 2018.

=== Mariana Islands ===
In the Mariana Islands, a tropical storm warning was put in effect for the islands Saipan and Tinian. Meanwhile, a hurricane warning was issued for the islands of Agrihan, Pagan, and Alamagan. 18 people stayed at 4 shelters in Saipan and Tinian, while a liaison officer was sent to the former to help response efforts. Public schools and government offices were forced to shut down on the islands of Saipan and Tinian. However, schools remained open on Rota. As Cimaron dumped several inches of rainfall over the Northern Mariana Islands, a flash flood watch was put in place for Saipan, Tinian, Alamagan, Pagan, and Agrihan. Widespread flash flooding was reported with the worst being in Saipan where numerous roads were flooded. Heavy rainfall peaked at 8 in (200 mm) in Saipan. A couple of days after Cimaron affected the Mariana Islands, the clearing of floodwaters began in Saipan.

=== Japan ===
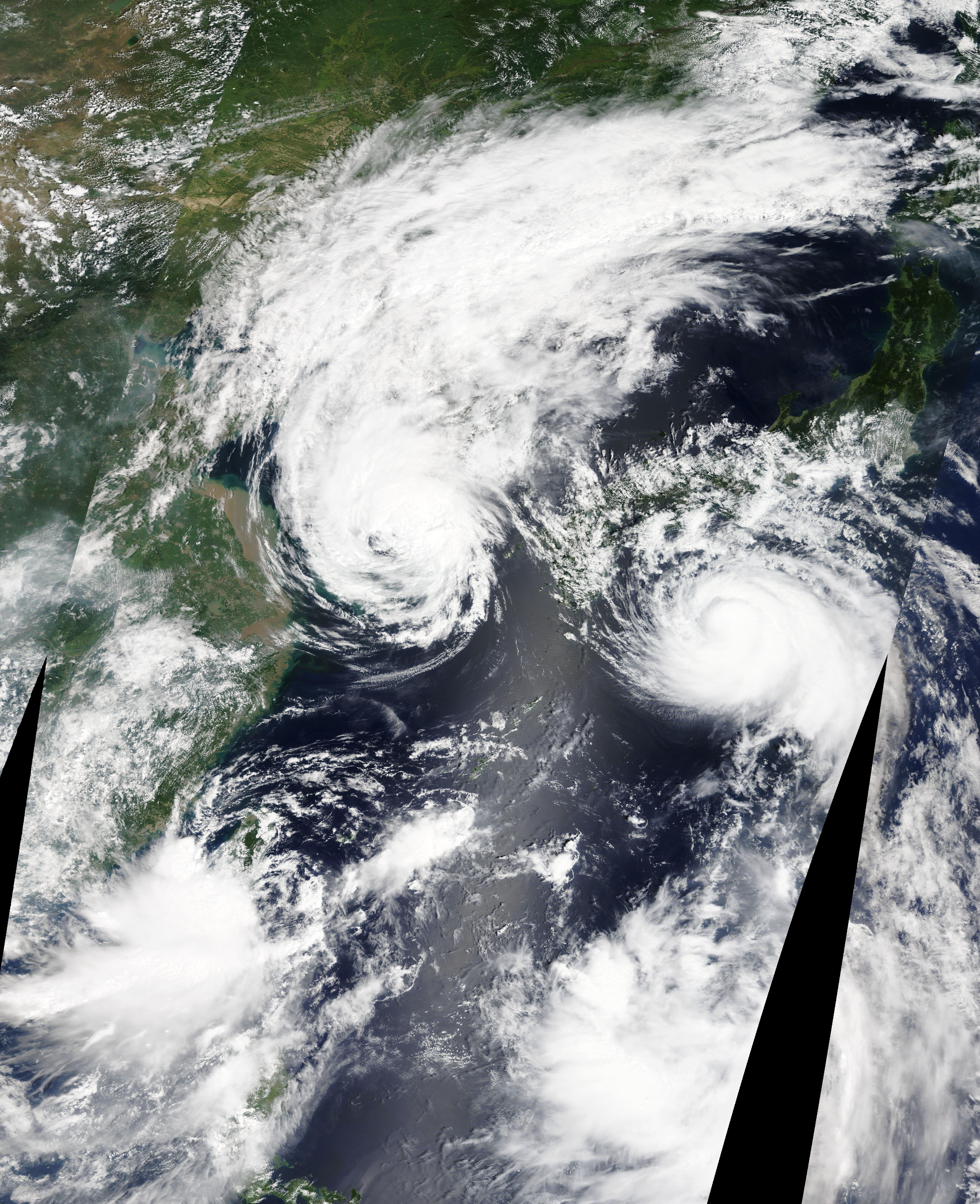
Typhoons Cimaron and Soulik along with Tropical Depression 24W all active simultaneously on August 23

Ahead of the storm, the JMA issued windstorm warnings in parts of Hyogo, Okayama, Wakayama, Tottori, Kagawa, Tokushima, Kochi, Ehime Oita, Miyazaki, and Kagoshima prefectures. Meanwhile, strong wind warnings were put in effect for the prefectures of Osaka, Nara, Hiroshima, Yamaguchi, Shimane, Fukuoka, Nagasaki, and Saga. The British Embassy in Japan and the Japanese Ministry of Defense announced that a beach landing drill would be cancelled due to the storm. Evacuations were ordered in Hyogo, Osaka, and Wakayama prefectures. In Kobe, around 103,550 people were ordered to evacuate. Some public transportation services were suspended on August 23. 76 flights were cancelled at the Osaka International Airport while 52 flights were cancelled at the Kansai International Airport. Ferry services connecting Shikoku and Kansai were mostly suspended on August 23.

As Cimaron made landfall in Japan on August 23, a peak wind gust of 108 mph (174 km/h) was reported in Tomogashima. A peak precipitation amount of 393.7 mm (15.50 in) was recorded in the village of Kamikitayama. Heavy rainfall from the storm in Wakayama Prefecture caused the Kumano River to overflow, causing fields and rice paddies to flood. On the Akashi Kaikyo Bridge in Hyogo Prefecture, 5 vehicles were blown over by gusty winds. A 60-meter-tall (200 ft) wind turbine was toppled in Awaji. The roof of an apartment was blown away with part of it landing on a parking lot in Nishinomiya. At the Narita International Airport in Tokyo, a plane went into a nosedive while making a rough landing during the storm. Roughly 138,000 households lost electricity because of the storm. Five homes were damaged by the storm and seven other were flooded due to Cimaron. 33 people were injured due to wind-related incidents in the prefectures of Hyogo and Kyoto. 3 college students in Shizuoka died after being swept out to sea, with their belongings being found on the beach. 22 people were also injured. Agricultural damage in Kyoto, Wakayama, and Shiga prefectures totaled JP¥3.41 billion (US$30.6 million).

== See also ==
- Weather of 2018
- Tropical cyclones in 2018
- Typhoon Jebi (2018) – took a similar track affecting the same areas as Cimaron nearly two weeks later
