= Typhoon Muifa (2011) =

Pacific typhoon in 2011

Typhoon Muifa (Kabayan)
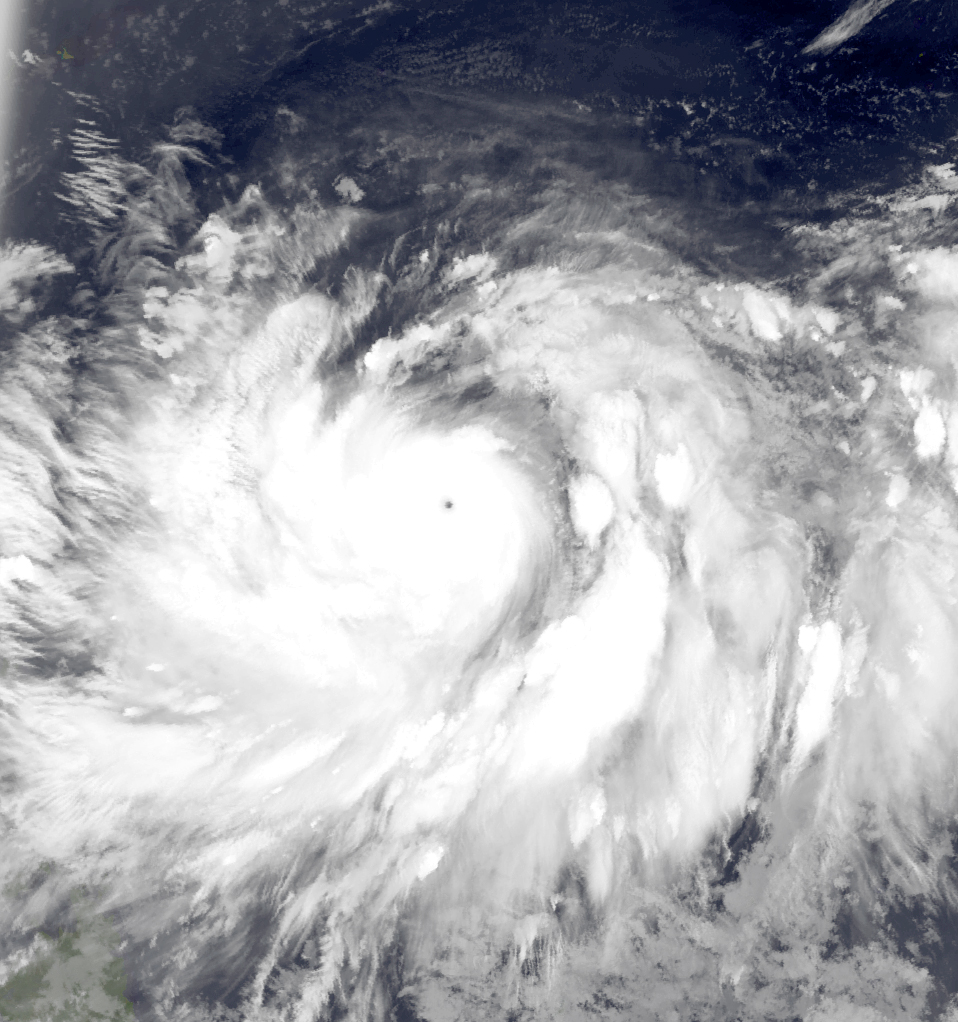
- Muifa at peak intensity on 30 July

Meteorological history
- Formed: July 27, 2011
- Extratropical: August 9, 2011
- Dissipated: August 15, 2011

Very strong typhoon
- 10-minute sustained (JMA)
- Highest winds: 175 km/h (110 mph)
- Lowest pressure: 930 hPa (mbar); 27.46 inHg

Category 5-equivalent super typhoon
- 1-minute sustained (SSHWS/JTWC)
- Highest winds: 260 km/h (160 mph)
- Lowest pressure: 918 hPa (mbar); 27.11 inHg

Overall effects
- Fatalities: 22 total
- Injuries: 42
- Missing: 6
- Damage: $480 million (2011 USD)
- Areas affected: Micronesia, Philippines, Taiwan, Japan, China, Korea, Russia
- IBTrACS
- Part of the 2011 Pacific typhoon season

Typhoon Muifa, (Note: The name Muifa (Cantonese: 梅花, [muːi˨˩ faː˥]) was contributed by Macau and means plum blossom (Prunus mume) in Cantonese.) known in the Philippines as Typhoon Kabayan, was a large, powerful and persistent typhoon which affected a number of countries in the Pacific in early-August 2011, killing 22 and causing widespread damage worth US$480 million. It was the ninth named storm, third typhoon and the second super-typhoon of the 2011 Pacific typhoon season.

The low-pressure area which became Typhoon Muifa originally formed on 23 July. It gradually drifted to the west, becoming a tropical depression. As it turned north and neared the Philippines it rapidly strengthened, becoming a Category 5 typhoon on the Saffir–Simpson hurricane scale (SSHS). In the Philippines, the storm claimed eight lives and caused much damage. The system brought down trees; the northeast Philippines experienced strong winds and heavy rains, leaving motorists stranded on several roads and expressways. Muifa also sank a Malay ship with 178 passengers. The system then drifted north, weakening steadily until it curved to the west and threatened Micronesia. The typhoon hit Okinawa, Japan with 41 inches of rain, flooding the small island and injuring 37 people in a 30-hour period. The storm disrupted air travel, leaving 13,630 people stranded on the island. The system then steadily drifted west, nearing Taiwan and prompting emergency warnings and high alerts; however, the storm missed the island. The typhoon moved further west towards mainland China, causing thousands to flee from their homes. A level-4 high-wave warning was issued, and some 11,000 rescue workers mobilized in 120 teams.

== Meteorological history ==
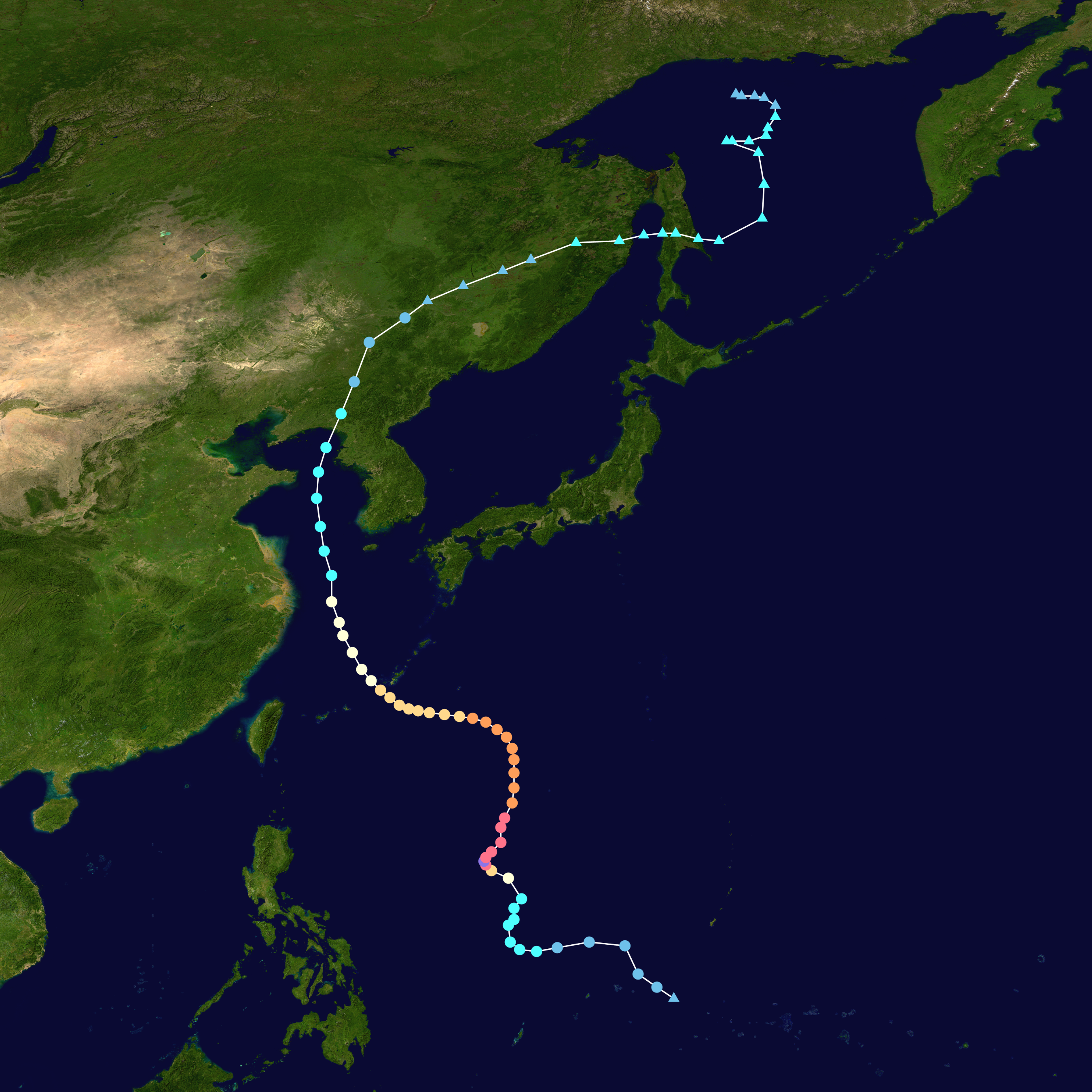
Map plotting the storm's track and intensity, according to the Saffir–Simpson scale Map key Saffir–Simpson scale Tropical depression (≤38 mph, ≤62 km/h) Tropical storm (39–73 mph, 63–118 km/h) Category 1 (74–95 mph, 119–153 km/h) Category 2 (96–110 mph, 154–177 km/h) Category 3 (111–129 mph, 178–208 km/h) Category 4 (130–156 mph, 209–251 km/h) Category 5 (≥157 mph, ≥252 km/h) Unknown Storm type Tropical cyclone Subtropical cyclone Extratropical cyclone, remnant low, tropical disturbance, or monsoon depression

A parade of low-pressure areas and tropical disturbances formed from the Intertropical Convergence Zone late on 15 July. Late on 23 July, one of the last low-pressure systems developed further to a weak tropical disturbance, which formed southeast of Chuuk in Micronesia. The system drifted to the west, and on 25 July the Joint Typhoon Warning Center (JTWC) upgraded the low-pressure area to a tropical depression. At that time, it was located approximately 505 nautical miles (935 km; 581 mi) west of Guam. At midnight that day, the JMA began monitoring the system as a tropical depression.

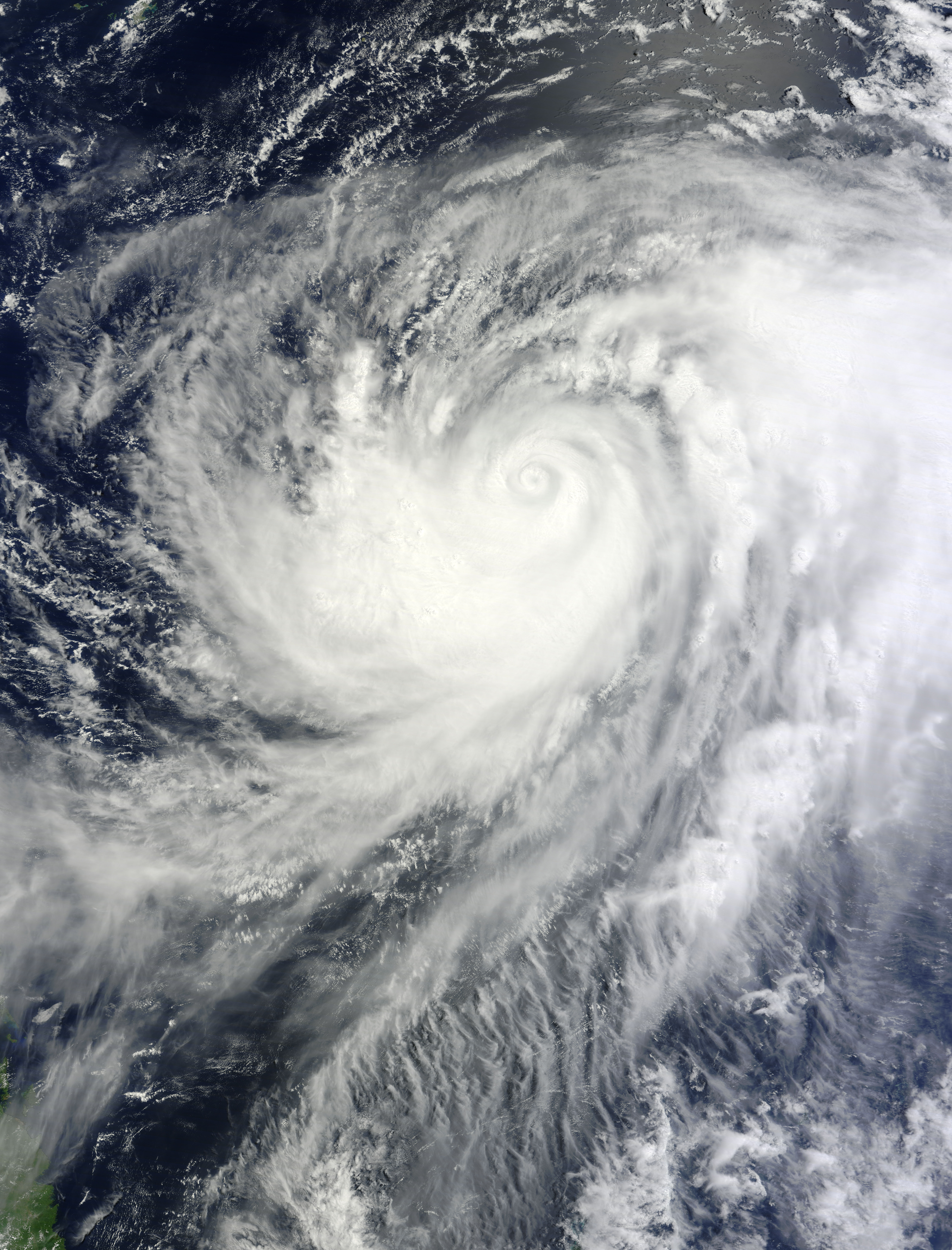
Typhoon Muifa during an eyewall replacement cycle on 1 August

Early on 28 July, the JTWC upgraded the system to a tropical storm. A few hours later the JMA also upgraded the system to a tropical storm, naming it Muifa. Also on 28 July, the storm entered the Philippine Area of Responsibility (PAR); the Philippine Atmospheric, Geophysical and Astronomical Services Administration (PAGASA) named it Kabayan. The storm drifted north over the next day, while maintaining tropical-storm strength. On the night of 29 July, Muifa was upgraded to a severe tropical storm. Overnight, the storm strengthened rapidly and was upgraded to a typhoon the next morning. According to the JTWC, Muifa had strengthened from a tropical storm to a super typhoon in less than 24 hours; it reported that the storm was reaching one-minute sustained wind speed of 140 knots (260 km/h; 160 mph). However, the typhoon weakened later in the day. According to the JTWC, on 31 July the typhoon encountered an upper-level trough and weakened to a category-4 typhoon on the SSHS.

The system gradually moved north, then turned west and drifted towards Okinawa before turning northwest again (when it was finally downgraded to a tropical storm by the JTWC). Soon afterwards, the JMA downgraded Muifa to a severe tropical storm. After weakening to a tropical storm, Muifa made landfall at the estuary of the Yalu River on 8 August and the JTWC issued its final warning. Early on 9 August, Muifa weakened to a tropical depression in northeast China and later became a low-pressure area.

== Preparations ==
=== Okinawa ===
Japanese officials canceled several flights to Okinawa, leaving hundreds of passengers stranded. On 5 August, China Airlines cancelled several flights to Okinawa as the storm passed within 45 nautical miles (83 km) of the island.

=== Taiwan ===
Light rain with moderate winds were reported throughout Taiwan, as the outer rain bands of the system brushed the island nation. The Central Weather Bureau (CWB) announced that heavy rains and strong winds would impact the Republic of China. On 6 August the CWB lifted the sea warning for Taiwan, since the system had turned northwest and was no longer expected to cause any damage to the island.

=== Mainland China ===
As the system approached mainland China, PRC authorities began ordering fishing boats back to shore. Residents of Shanghai were also warned, since the storm was expected to be as strong as Typhoon Matsa in 2005. To prevent railway accidents during the storm, Shanghai railway authorities set up a team to inspect high-speed railway facilities. The Ministry of Civil Affairs (MCA) issued a decree on 4 August ordering civil agencies in Shanghai and the provinces of Zhejiang, Jiangsu, Anhui, Fujian, Jiangxi and Shandong to carry out disaster-relief operations, preventing as many casualties as possible. An orange alert, the second highest in the four-level sea-wave alert system, was issued on the East China Sea as the system neared land. On 5 August the port of Ningbo, one of China's busiest ports, was partially shut down due to the typhoon. PRC officials declared that the system was the strongest that year to date to impact the nation, as it passed Taiwan maintaining typhoon strength. As a result, PRC officials temporarily closed several oil, dry-bulk and container ports. Millions of people living along the coast were ordered to stay indoors, and several hundred flights were cancelled as the typhoon was expected to be the worst to affect China's commercial centre since 2005. Landfall was initially expected over Zhejiang Province on Saturday, 6 August. The storm was expected to bring rainfall to more than ten provinces, over an area of one million square kilometers.

On 6 August, as the typhoon approached, over 200,000 people were evacuated from low-lying areas; however, although 140 more flights were cancelled the typhoon was no longer expected to directly impact the nation. The meteorological agency announced that heavy rain and strong winds would affect the nation for three days, beginning on 7 August. Some 11,000 rescue workers in 120 teams were mobilized to respond to the storm and protect as many people as possible. The National Marine Environmental Forecasting Center issued a red alert (the highest alert in the four-level high-wave warning system) as the system swept across the East China Sea at typhoon strength. Waves as high as 9–11 meters were expected throughout the East China Sea. Shanghai railway authorities established an emergency response plan: if Muifa's winds were less than 62 km/h in Shanghai, the subway would be manually operated at low speed. If winds were greater than 89 km/h, the trains would be cancelled. Both airports in Shanghai were closed, and all outdoor events were also cancelled or postponed. As the system neared land, the Shanghai government urged residents to stay indoors with first-aid kits and emergency supplies. A message from the federal government of the United States to Americans living in China advised them to "stock up on emergency supplies of food, water, and cash in case of storm-related power outages".

As the system brushed Shanghai, residents of Qingdao began their preparations for the storm. Although weaker, the system's heavy surf battered Qingdao's waterfront and the beaches were closed. As reported on 9 August, some 1.35 million people were evacuated as the system approached its final landfall in northern China.

== Impact ==
Impact by country or region
| Country | Casualties | | | Damage (USD) |
| Country | Deaths | Injuries | Missing | Damage (USD) |
| Mainland China | 0 | 0 | 1 | ~$480 million |
| Japan | 0 | 37 | 0 | N/A |
| Philippines | 8 | 5 | 3 | $59,428 |
| South Korea | 4 | 0 | 2 | N/A |
| North Korea | 10 | 0 | 0 | N/A |
| Total | 22 | 42 | 6 | ~$480 million |

=== Philippines ===
Although the storm did not directly impact the Philippines, its rain bands caused considerable damage to the nation. According to a situation report by the National Disaster Risk Reduction and Management Council (NDRRMC), the typhoon killed four people and caused damage worth US$59,203. On 2 August thousands of people living near the Marikina River in Metro Manila fled as alert level 2 was issued, after water rose to dangerously-high levels. Minutes before the announcement was made, the Malacañan Palace released an order closing schools, colleges and offices. Authorities mobilized emergency personnel to ready evacuations from areas near the capital region's rivers and canals, where flood waters were rising. On 4 August, the NDRRMC raised the death toll to eight and total damage to agriculture and infrastructure to US$59,428. It was reported that CGAC in Iloilo coordinated commercial vessels rescuing 178 passengers after a passenger ship, M/V Asia Malaysia, sank near Calabazas Island, Ajuy, Iloilo.

=== Okinawa ===
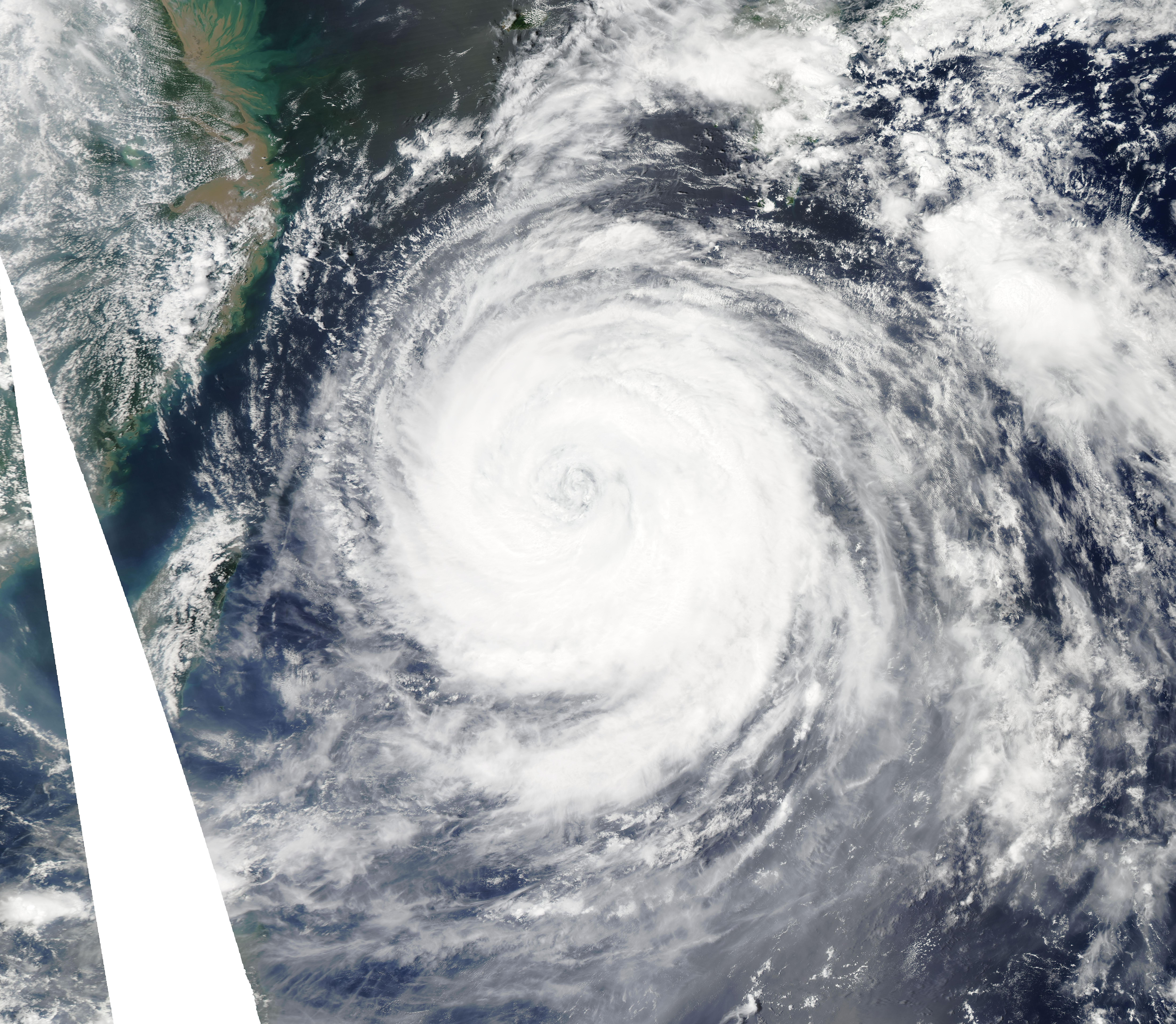
Typhoon Muifa near Okinawa Island on 5 August

On 5 August, the storm passed just 45 nautical miles (83 km) southwest of Kadena Air Base, bringing sustained winds of 65 knots (75 mph; 120 km/h) and 41 inches (1,000 mm) of rain. Thirty-seven people were injured, six critically. Nearly 300 flights were cancelled, leaving 13,630 stranded.

=== China ===
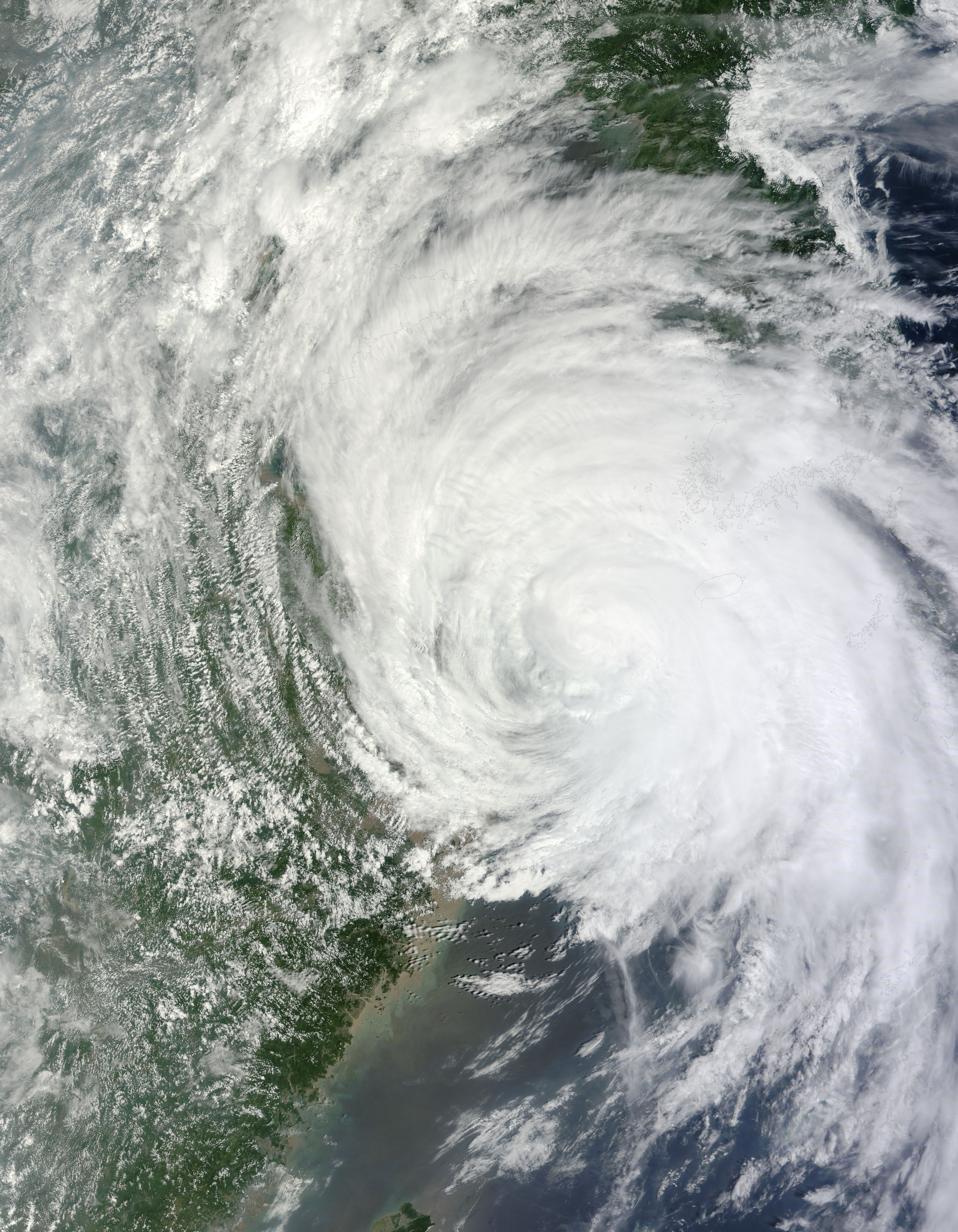
Typhoon Muifa brushing the eastern coast of China on 7 August

Offshore, ten fishing vessels (with about 200 people aboard) were reported missing; however, there was uncertainty about whether Muifa was the cause. On 7 August, as the typhoon brushed the coast of Shanghai, a major sea bridge linking the urban area to an outlying island was closed. Heavy rains and strong winds battered the city, and some 400,000 people were moved to evacuation centers. Tens of thousands of fishing boats remained in port. Hundreds of flights were cancelled, leaving thousands of passengers stranded. One person was reported missing as a boat sank off Zhejiang in storm surge associated with Muifa. Strong winds knocked down billboards and cut power in two residential areas of Shanghai. However, the typhoon weakened before it reached the city and many stores remained open.

Although weakened, the storm wreaked havoc in Zhejiang province; 169 houses, 3,500 tonnes of crops and 121,300 tonnes of aquatic products were destroyed. Economic losses were estimated at US$289.9 million. The system threatened the chemical plant in Dalian; authorities reported that loads of rocks were dumped along the coastline to prevent damage to the plant from the 25-metre (82 ft)-high waves spawned by the storm.

On 9 August, as the system approached its final landfall, a total of 183 counties in China's coastal provinces were reported to be battered by the system and estimates of economic loss were raised to US$480 million. The system battered the provinces of Liaoning, Zhejiang and Jiangsu, affecting 1.74 million residents and damaging 101,000 hectares of farmland.

=== Korean Peninsula ===
In South Korea the system felled trees, outed power and caused the cancellation of many Seoul-bound flights. Heavy rain and strong winds were experienced on the west Korean coast. Four people were killed and two others were missing in South Korea due to the storm. In North Korea the storm destroyed 2,400 acres of cropland, 100 houses and 10 public buildings, leaving 10 people dead.

== See also ==
- Other tropical cyclones named Muifa
- Other tropical cyclones named Kabayan
- Tropical cyclones in 2011
- Weather of 2011
- Typhoon Sinlaku (2002)
- Tropical Storm Trami (2013)
- Tropical Storm Khanun (2012)
- Typhoon Bolaven (2012)
- Typhoon Soulik (2018)
- Typhoon Lingling (2019)
- Typhoon Bavi (2020)
