= Tropical Storm Cimaron (2013) =

Pacific tropical storm in 2013

Tropical Storm Cimaron (Isang)
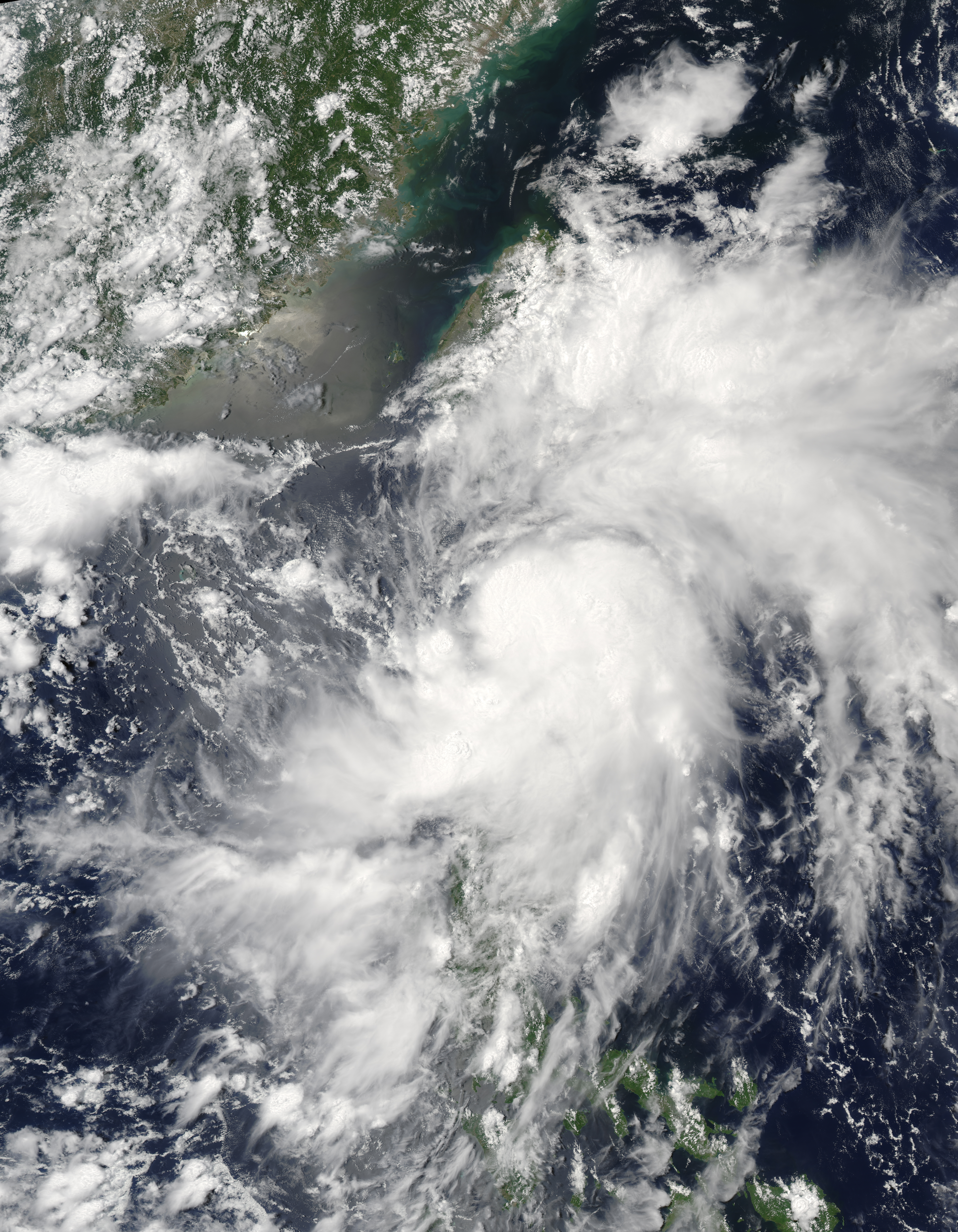
- Tropical Storm Cimaron over Calayan Group of Islands on July 17

Meteorological history
- Formed: July 15, 2013
- Dissipated: July 18, 2013

Tropical storm
- 10-minute sustained (JMA)
- Highest winds: 75 km/h (45 mph)
- Lowest pressure: 1000 hPa (mbar); 29.53 inHg

Tropical storm
- 1-minute sustained (SSHWS/JTWC)
- Highest winds: 75 km/h (45 mph)
- Lowest pressure: 993 hPa (mbar); 29.32 inHg

Overall effects
- Fatalities: 6 total
- Damage: $322 million (2013 USD)
- Areas affected: Philippines; Taiwan; China
- IBTrACS
- Part of the 2013 Pacific typhoon season

Tropical Storm Cimaron, (Note: The name Cimaron (Tagalog: cimaron, [simɐɾo̞n]) was contributed by the Philippines and means "to be wild, ferocious" in Tagalog.) known in the Philippines as Tropical Storm Isang, was a weak tropical storm, with only a pressure of 1000 hPa and 45 mph. It formed and made landfall in the Philippines, especially Luzon, and China, as well as affecting Southern Taiwan during its nearby passage. Cimaron started as an area of low-pressure near Eastern Luzon. The disturbance indicated that it would intensify gradually in the coming days. PAGASA later named the depression Isang after they started issuing advisories. JTWC would later give its identifier as Tropical Depression 08W. 08W made landfall at the eastern tip of Northern Luzon, bringing heavy rainfall over the area. It began to enter the Bashi Channel, where environmental conditions were favorable to intensify the depression. On May 17, 08W further intensified into a tropical storm, prompting the JMA to name the storm Cimaron. Cimaron turned northwest and entered the South China Sea. Cimaron made its 2nd and last landfall in Zhangpu County in China on July 18. Rapid weakening ensued and all agencies declared Cimaron that it had dissipated on the same day.

Despite being weak, the storm caused extensive damage amounting to approximately $325 million in China, as well as 6 deaths in total, with 2 in the Philippines.

== Meteorological history ==
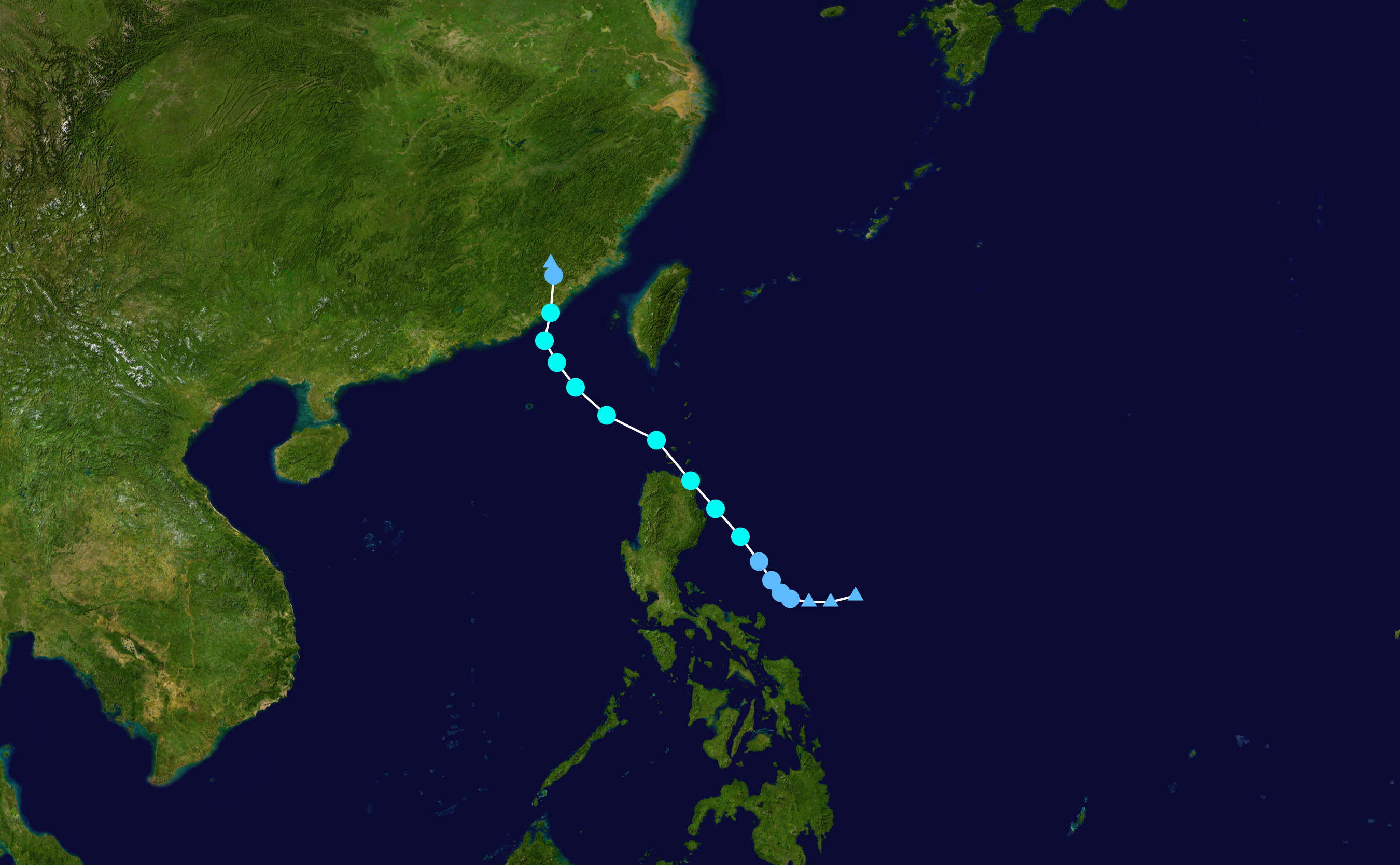
Map plotting the storm's track and intensity, according to the Saffir–Simpson scale Map key Saffir–Simpson scale Tropical depression (≤38 mph, ≤62 km/h) Tropical storm (39–73 mph, 63–118 km/h) Category 1 (74–95 mph, 119–153 km/h) Category 2 (96–110 mph, 154–177 km/h) Category 3 (111–129 mph, 178–208 km/h) Category 4 (130–156 mph, 209–251 km/h) Category 5 (≥157 mph, ≥252 km/h) Unknown Storm type Tropical cyclone Subtropical cyclone Extratropical cyclone, remnant low, tropical disturbance, or monsoon depression

In late July 14, a tropical low was formed near Eastern Luzon, as it was gradually moving eastward, the tropical low's deep convection started to wrap around forming a better-defined circulation. Still as a tropical depression, finally on July 16, a tropical depression generated over the western North Pacific to the east of the Luzon Island of the Philippines. The Joint Typhoon Warning Center (JTWC) categorized the depression as 08W, and the Philippine Atmospheric, Geophysical and Astronomical Services Administration (PAGASA) promptly named it the Philippine name Isang.

As the tropical cyclone which will soon become Cimaron, was currently moving northeastward, still as a tropical depression, it made landfall in Northern Luzon at the same intensity. Many raindrops fell from the sky while thunderstorms spread around the area. A strike of lightning spawned and struck the province of Ilocos Sur, killing 2 people and leaving an extra 2 more injured.

After its landfall in the Philippines, the cyclone entered the Bashi Channel. As it did, it also entered conducive conditions. Due to the favorable ocean conditions, the cyclone's intensity was upgraded to tropical storm status. Simultaneously, it was named Cimaron (1308) by the JMA on early July 17. Cimaron continued to move northwest and entered the northeastern South China Sea, where it affected areas of Taiwan, but no fatalities, injuries, or any missing people were reported around that area. It afterwards began to turn towards the north and approached the south coast of Fujian. It finally made its last landfall as a weak tropical storm of the Zhangpu County on the date of July 18, with the maximum wind speed at its center reaching at least 45 mph at its landfall.

After landfall, Cimaron continued to move in a northwestern direction, with its intensity decreasing very rapidly, and it weakened into a tropical depression within Fujian on July 18. The Japan Meteorological Agency stopped monitoring the storm at 21:00 UTC on July 18, as it was declared it had dissipated by then.

== Preparations and impact ==
=== Philippines ===
On July 17, a lightning incident within the Philippine province of Ilocos Sur, left two people dead and two others injured.

=== China ===
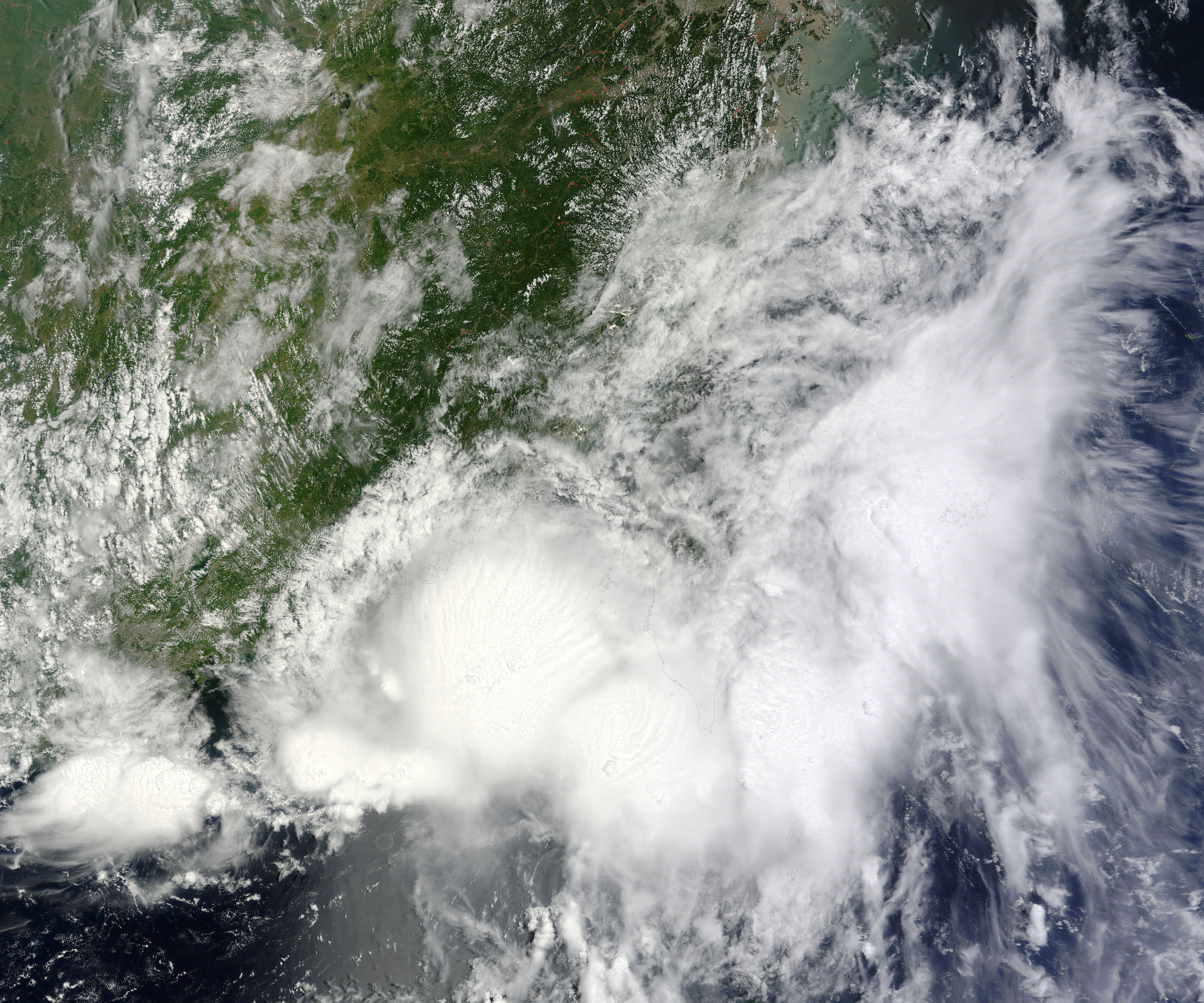
Tropical Storm Cimaron near landfall in Fujian on July 18

300,000 people were evacuated due to safety. As previously mentioned, a lightning incident occurred in the Philippines killing 2 people. 20 million people were affected by the cyclone, and approximately 9 million people were relocated around the landfall area. An intense and unusual thunderstorm by the cyclone produced 406 lightning strikes in under 2 hours in Xiamen. Direct economic losses from the storm amounted to ¥1.98 billion (US$322 million).

== Aftermath ==
Many torrential rains cascaded down to land in Fujian. In 24 hours, a peak of 505.3 mm (19.89 in) was measured in Mei Village, with an hourly maximum of 132.3 mm (5.21 in). Many roads were flooded and houses damaged due to Cimaron's passage. Areas near Cimaron's landfall had experienced flooding that can happen once in every 500 years. Many powers lines were cut, as well as houses were also destroyed.

== See also ==
- Other tropical cyclones named Cimaron
- Other tropical cyclones named Isang
- Tropical Storm Linfa (2009)
- Tropical Storm Hagibis (2014)
- Tropical Storm Merbok (2017)
