= Tropical Storm Khanun (2012) =

Pacific severe tropical storm in 2012

Severe Tropical Storm Khanun (Enteng)
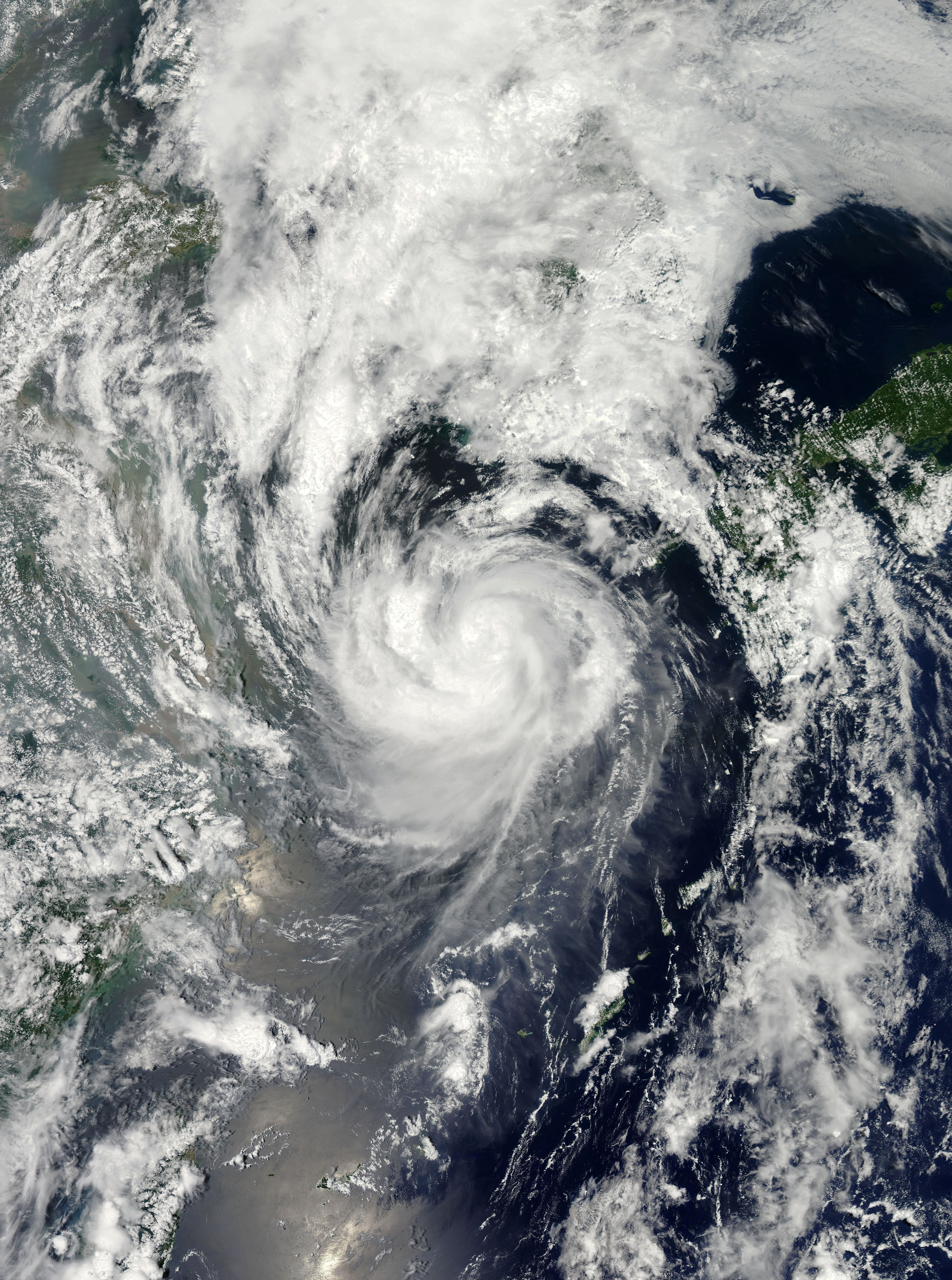
- Tropical Storm Khanun approaching South Korea at peak intensity on July 18

Meteorological history
- Formed: July 14, 2012
- Extratropical: July 19, 2012
- Dissipated: July 20, 2012

Severe tropical storm
- 10-minute sustained (JMA)
- Highest winds: 95 km/h (60 mph)
- Lowest pressure: 985 hPa (mbar); 29.09 inHg

Tropical storm
- 1-minute sustained (SSHWS/JTWC)
- Highest winds: 95 km/h (60 mph)
- Lowest pressure: 982 hPa (mbar); 29.00 inHg

Overall effects
- Fatalities: 89 total
- Damage: $11.4 million (2012 USD)
- Areas affected: South Korea, North Korea, Japan, Mariana Islands
- IBTrACS
- Part of the 2012 Pacific typhoon season

Severe Tropical Storm Khanun, (Note: The name Khanun (Thai: ขนุน, [kʰa˨˩ nun˩˩˦]) was contributed by Thailand and means jackfruit (Artocarpus heterophyllus) in Thai.) known in the Philippines as Tropical Storm Enteng, was the first tropical cyclone to directly impact Korea in two years. It is the 8th named storm, the 3rd severe tropical storm, and overall, the 13th tropical cyclone to be monitored by the Japan Meteorological Agency (JMA) during 2012. Khanun was also the first tropical storm to make a landfall over Korea in 2012.

== Meteorological history ==
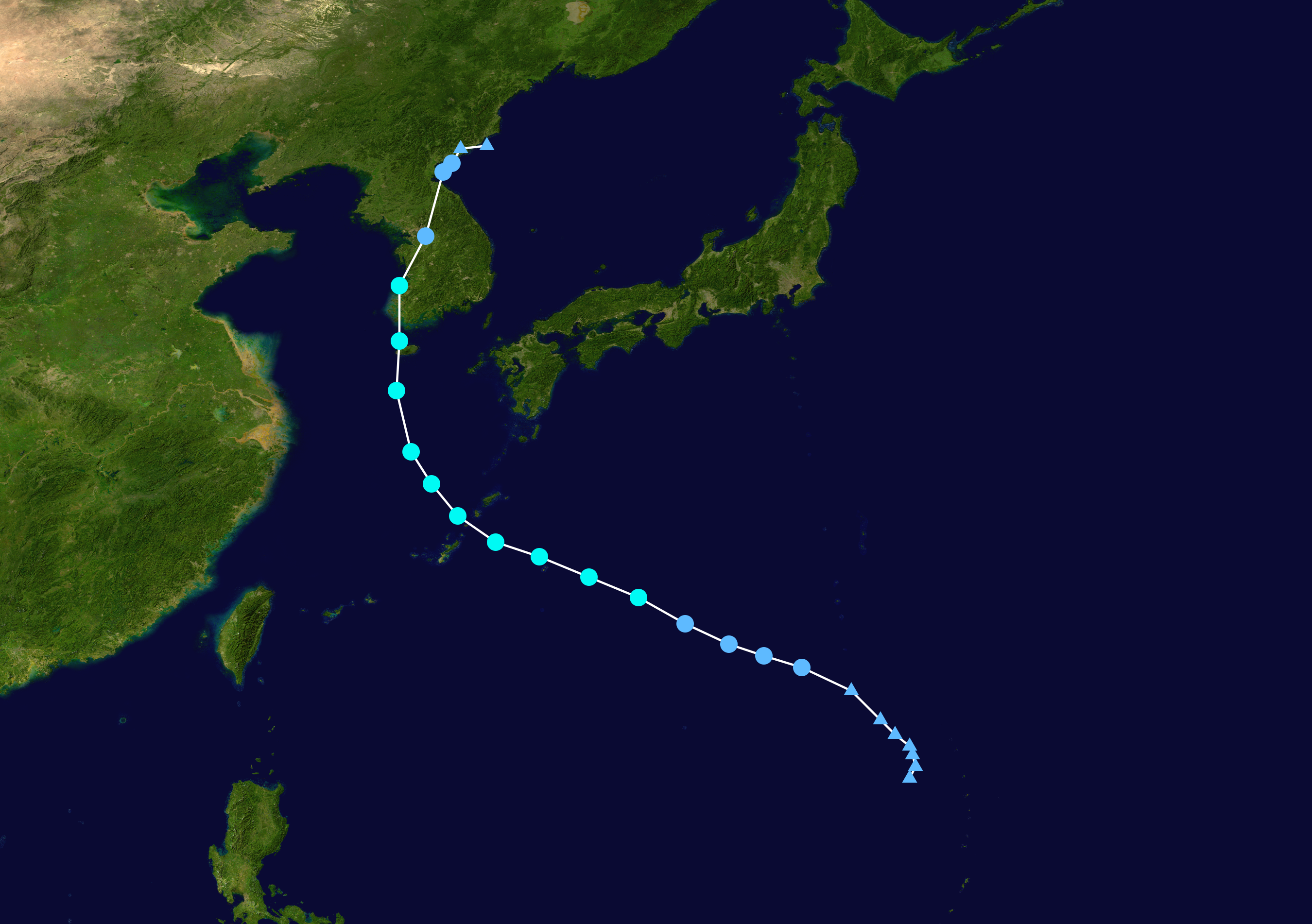
Map plotting the storm's track and intensity, according to the Saffir–Simpson scale Map key Saffir–Simpson scale Tropical depression (≤38 mph, ≤62 km/h) Tropical storm (39–73 mph, 63–118 km/h) Category 1 (74–95 mph, 119–153 km/h) Category 2 (96–110 mph, 154–177 km/h) Category 3 (111–129 mph, 178–208 km/h) Category 4 (130–156 mph, 209–251 km/h) Category 5 (≥157 mph, ≥252 km/h) Unknown Storm type Tropical cyclone Subtropical cyclone Extratropical cyclone, remnant low, tropical disturbance, or monsoon depression

On July 14 at 02:30 UTC, the Joint Typhoon Warning Center (JTWC) began monitoring an area of convection that had originated from a non-tropical low as it was located approximately 420 nautical miles (780 km; 485 mi) north-northeast of Guam. The low-level circulation was ill-defined, with the JTWC assessing its development potential within the next 24 hours as low. At 06:00 UTC, the JTWC further upgraded its development potential within the next 24 hours to medium, with sea surface temperatures in the area around 30–32 °C (86–90 °F). At 18:00 UTC, the Japan Meteorological Agency (JMA) upgraded the system to a tropical depression as it was moving west-northwest. (Note: The Japan Meteorological Agency is the official Regional Specialized Meteorological Center for the western Pacific Ocean.)

The depression was located in favorable conditions as convection flared to the east of an elongated low-level circulation, and on July 15 at 04:30 UTC, the JTWC issued a Tropical Cyclone Formation Alert on the system as it was located approximately 235 nautical miles (435 km; 270 mi) south-southeast of Iwo Jima. Convection continued to organize, and at 15:00 UTC, the JTWC upgraded the system to a tropical depression, giving it the unofficial designation of 08W. On July 16 at 06:00 UTC, the JMA upgraded the depression to a tropical storm, assigning it the name Khanun. The low-level circulation continued to consolidate, and at 12:00 UTC, Khanun entered the Philippine Area of Responsibility (PAR), with the PAGASA giving it the local name Enteng. It later exited the PAR at 18:00 UTC. Khanun continued to organize, and at 15:00 UTC, the JTWC upgraded it to a tropical storm as it was located approximately 370 nautical miles (685 km; 425 mi) east-northeast of Kadena Air Base. A weak eye feature appeared on microwave imagery, and on July 17 at 11:00 UTC, Khanun made its closest approach to Okinawa, passing within 85 nautical miles (155 km; 100 mi) of the island. Khanun peaked in intensity at 18:00 UTC, with maximum sustained winds of 95 kilometres per hour (60 mph) and a minimum central pressure of 985 hPa (mbar; 29.09 inHg). (Note: All winds are in ten-minute sustained standards, as per the Japan Meteorological Agency, unless otherwise stated.) On July 18, the JMA downgraded Khanun to a tropical storm south-southwest of Jeju Province. Around 21:00 (UTC) that same day, Khanun made landfall over Taean County, South Chungcheong Province, South Korea as a tropical storm, and soon made its extratropical transition over Korea, as it weakened into a tropical depression. On July 20, the remnant low dissipated completely.

== Preparations and impact ==
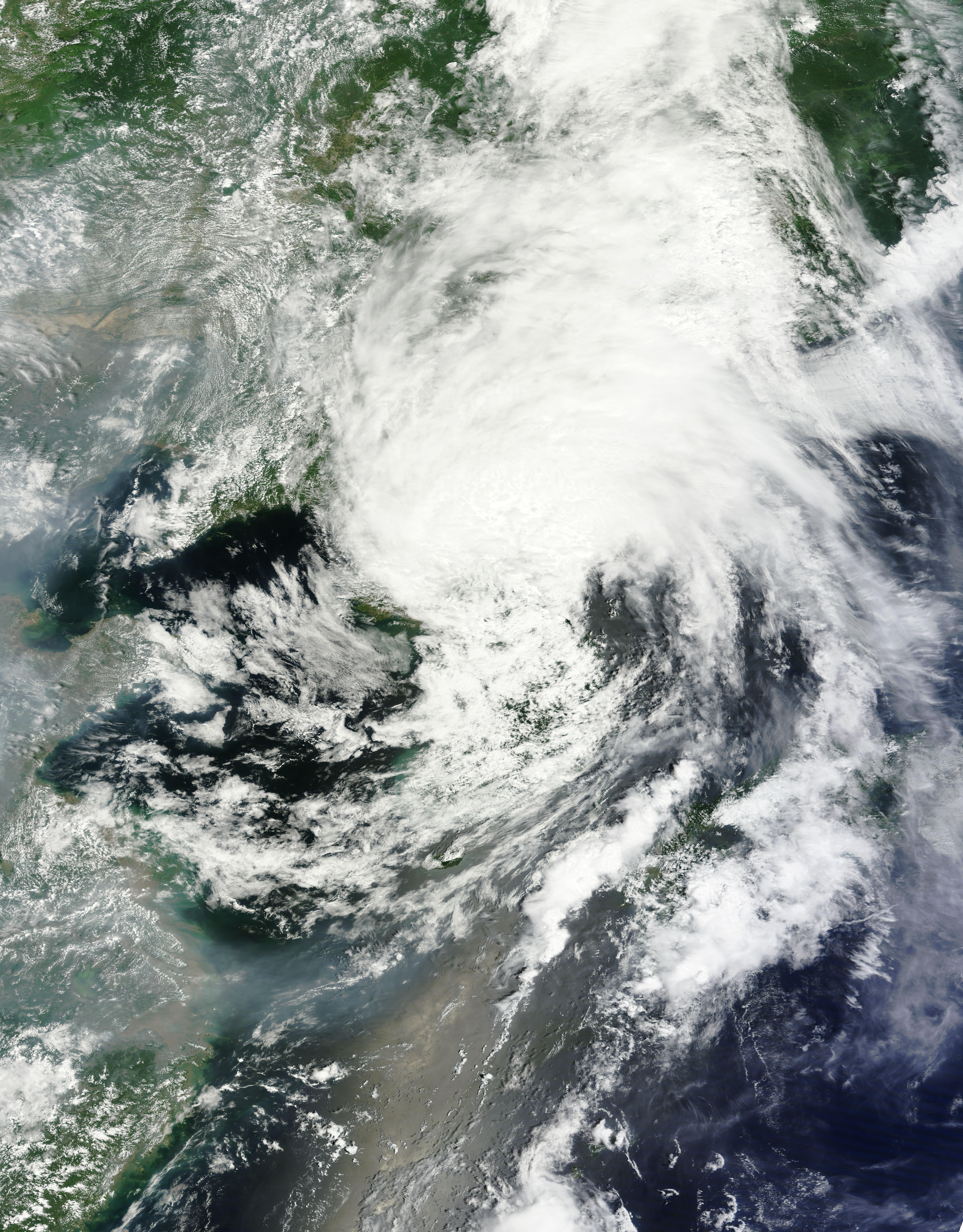
Tropical Storm Khanun over South Korea, on July 19, as it became extratropical.

=== South Korea ===
As Khanun approached the country, some 90 flights scheduled for Jeju and the southern city of Pohang, as well as 115 ferry trips for the southern islands were canceled.

The storm brought a severe drought to an end, due to the country experiencing less rainfall than average. Heavy rainfall was concentrated in Jeju and the western part of Korea, recording over 40 mm (1.6 in). The city of Suncheon reported accumulated rainfall totals of 135 mm (5.3 in) during July 18-19. The storm temporarily left some 26,000 households without electricity. An 83 year-old woman was killed as heavy rains and gales caused parts of a house to collapse in North Gyeongsang Province. Losses across the country were at ₩1.5 billion (US$11.4 million).

=== North Korea ===
In North Korea, state-run media reported that at least seven people were killed in Kangwon province, with an eighth fatality reported elsewhere. It said the storm caused significant damage, destroying 650 dwelling houses, 30 public buildings, railways, roads, bridges, and various systems. Flooding from the storm inundated 3,870 homes, which left at least 16,250 homeless.

On 29 July the North Korean government dramatically raised the death toll in the country to 88, with an additional 134 injured. At least 63,000 were made homeless by the flooding, while more than 30,000 hectares of land for growing crops were submerged and will add to growing fears of another looming famine in the country.

On 31 July United Nations staff visited flood-ravaged areas in hard-hit South Pyongan and Kangwon provinces. Heavy rain continued along the western edge of the country, including the capital Pyongyang. North Korea's official media reported that premier Choe Yong Rim visited flooded towns and discussed ways to help recovery efforts.

== Aftermath ==
The North Korean government requested assistance from resident United Nations agencies. On 4 August, government sources announced the death toll from both Khanun and the torrential rains in late July had risen to 169, with around 400 others missing. At least 8,600 houses were destroyed and 44,000 houses were flooded, leaving more than 212,200 people homeless.

== See also ==
- Typhoon Prapiroon (2000)
- Typhoon Muifa (2011)
- Typhoon Halola
- Typhoon Soulik (2018)
- Typhoon Khanun (2023) - a tropical cyclone with the same name and affected the same area eleven years later.
