= List of storms named Soulik =

The name Soulik (Pohnpeian: Soulik, [sʲoulik]) has been used for five tropical cyclones in the western North Pacific Ocean. The name was contributed by the Federated States of Micronesia and is a traditional title of chiefs on Pohnpei.

- Typhoon Soulik (2000) (T0023, 34W, Welpring) – a major December storm that peaked in 2001 but never threatened land.
- Typhoon Soulik (2006) (T0618, 21W) – affected the Marianas and Volcano Islands.
- Typhoon Soulik (2013) (T1307, 07W, Huaning) – a strong Category 4 typhoon that caused widespread damage in Taiwan and East China.
- Typhoon Soulik (2018) (T1819, 22W) – a deadly and strong Category 3 typhoon that affected Japan and South Korea.
- Tropical Storm Soulik (2024) (T2415, 16W, Gener) – weak storm that made landfall in Vietnam.

Preceded by Pulasan	Pacific typhoon season names Soulik	Succeeded by Cimaron
