= Typhoon Rusa =

Pacific typhoon in 2002

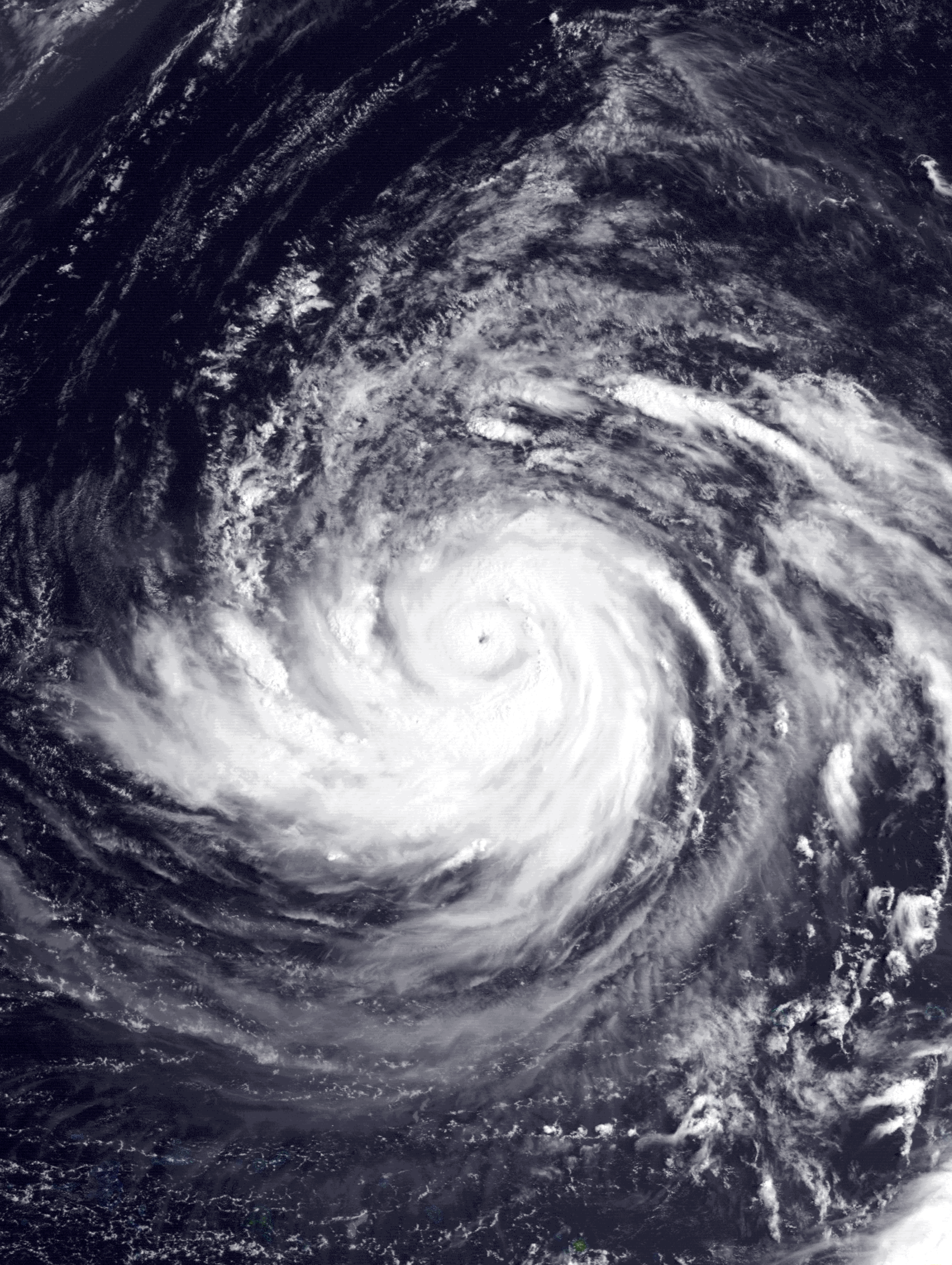
- Typhoon Rusa rapidly intensifying north of the Mariana Islands on August 25

Meteorological history
- Formed: August 22, 2002
- Extratropical: September 1, 2002
- Dissipated: September 4, 2002

Typhoon
- 10-minute sustained (JMA)
- Highest winds: 150 km/h (90 mph)
- Lowest pressure: 950 hPa (mbar); 28.05 inHg

Category 4-equivalent typhoon
- 1-minute sustained (SSHWS/JTWC)
- Highest winds: 215 km/h (130 mph)
- Lowest pressure: 927 hPa (mbar); 27.37 inHg

Overall effects
- Fatalities: >238 total
- Damage: $4.2 billion (2002 USD)
- Areas affected: Japan; Taiwan; Korea; Russian Far East
- IBTrACS
- Part of the 2002 Pacific typhoon season

Typhoon Rusa (Note: The name Rusa (Malay: rusa, [rusa]) was contributed by Malaysia and means deer in Malay.) was a deadly and destructive typhoon that severely affected South Korea in 2002. The twenty-first tropical depression (Note: according to the Joint Typhoon Warning Center (JTWC)), the fifteenth named storm, and the tenth typhoon of the 2002 Pacific typhoon season, Rusa developed on August 22 from a monsoon trough in the northwestern Pacific Ocean, to the southeast of Japan. For several days, Rusa moved northwestward, eventually intensifying into a powerful typhoon. On August 26, the storm moved across the Amami Islands, where it left 20,000 people without power and caused two fatalities. The typhoon dropped torrential rainfall across Japan, peaking at 902 mm (35.5 in) in Tokushima Prefecture.

After slightly weakening, Rusa made landfall in Goheung, South Korea with 10-minute maximum sustained winds of 140 km/h (85 mph). (Note: The Japan Meteorological Agency (JMA) uses 10-minute sustained winds, while the Joint Typhoon Warning Center (JTWC) uses 1-minute sustained winds. The conversion factor between the two is 1.14.) The storm was able to maintain much of its intensity due to warm air and instability from a nearby cold front. Rusa weakened while moving through the country, dropping heavy rainfall that peaked at 897.5 mm (35.33 in) in Gangneung. A 24-hour total precipitation of 880 mm (35 in) in the city broke the record for the highest daily precipitation in the country; however, the heaviest rainfall was localized. Over 17,000 houses were damaged, and large areas of crop fields were flooded. In South Korea, Rusa killed at least 233 people, making it the deadliest typhoon in the country in over 43 years, and caused $4.2 billion in damage. (Note: All damage totals are in 2002 United States dollars unless otherwise noted.) The typhoon also dropped heavy rainfall in the neighboring North Korea, leaving 26,000 people homeless and killing three. Rusa also destroyed large areas of crops in the country already affected by ongoing famine conditions. The typhoon later transitioned into an extratropical cyclone over eastern Russia on September 1 before dissipating three days later.

== Meteorological history ==
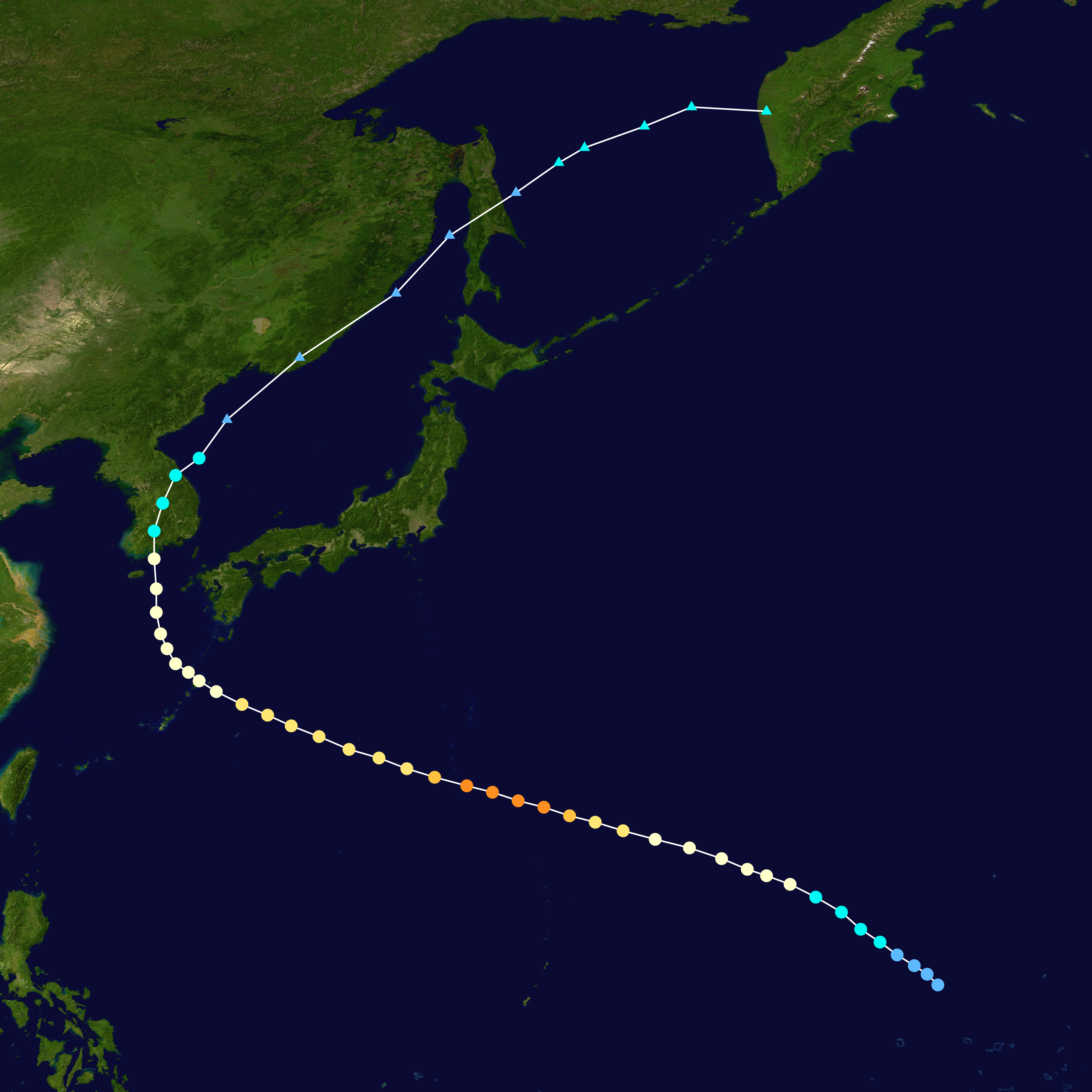
Map plotting the storm's track and intensity, according to the Saffir–Simpson scale Map key Saffir–Simpson scale Tropical depression (≤38 mph, ≤62 km/h) Tropical storm (39–73 mph, 63–118 km/h) Category 1 (74–95 mph, 119–153 km/h) Category 2 (96–110 mph, 154–177 km/h) Category 3 (111–129 mph, 178–208 km/h) Category 4 (130–156 mph, 209–251 km/h) Category 5 (≥157 mph, ≥252 km/h) Unknown Storm type Tropical cyclone Subtropical cyclone Extratropical cyclone, remnant low, tropical disturbance, or monsoon depression

The monsoon trough spawned a tropical depression on August 22 north of Bikini Atoll and southwest of Wake Island. It moved to the west-northwest, a movement it would maintain for much of its duration. Early on August 23, it intensified into Tropical Storm Rusa, about 1,800 km (1,100 mi) east of Guam. At 1800 UTC on August 25, the Japan Meteorological Agency (JMA) (Note: The Japan Meteorological Agency is the official Regional Specialized Meteorological Center for the western Pacific Ocean.) upgraded Rusa to a typhoon while the system was northeast of the Northern Marianas Islands. The next day, the agency estimated that the typhoon attained peak winds of 150 km/h (90 mph 10 minute sustained). Around the same time, the Joint Typhoon Warning Center (JTWC) (Note: The Joint Typhoon Warning Center is a joint United States Navy – United States Air Force task force that issues tropical cyclone warnings for the western Pacific Ocean and other regions.) estimated peak winds of 215 km/h (135 mph 1 minute sustained).

While at peak intensity, Rusa struck the Japanese island of Amami Ōshima. After maintaining the peak winds for about 12 hours, Rusa weakened slightly as it continued to the west-northwest, but on August 28 the JMA again reported the typhoon attained winds of 150 km/h (90 mph 10 minute sustained). Despite forecasts that it would weaken, Rusa maintained its intensity while passing south of Japan, due to minimal wind shear and warm sea surface temperatures of up to 29 °C (84 °F). The typhoon again weakened slightly on August 29 while passing between the Amami Islands and Japan. Thereafter, Rusa turned to the north toward the Korean Peninsula. Warm, moist air blew across the peninsula ahead of the storm, which prevented significant weakening, and an approaching cold front contributed to atmospheric instability. At around 0800 UTC on August 31, Rusa made landfall on Goheung, South Korea, with winds of 140 km/h (85 mph 10 minute sustained). According to the JTWC, Rusa was the most powerful typhoon to hit the country since 1959. The typhoon rapidly weakened while crossing the country, deteriorating into a tropical depression early on September 1. Around that time, the JTWC issued its last advisory on the system. The depression turned to the northeast, and after moving through the Sea of Japan, Rusa became extratropical over Primorsky Krai in the Russian Far East late on September 1. The extratropical remnants continued northeast and dissipated on September 4 over the Kamchatka Peninsula.

== Preparations and impact ==
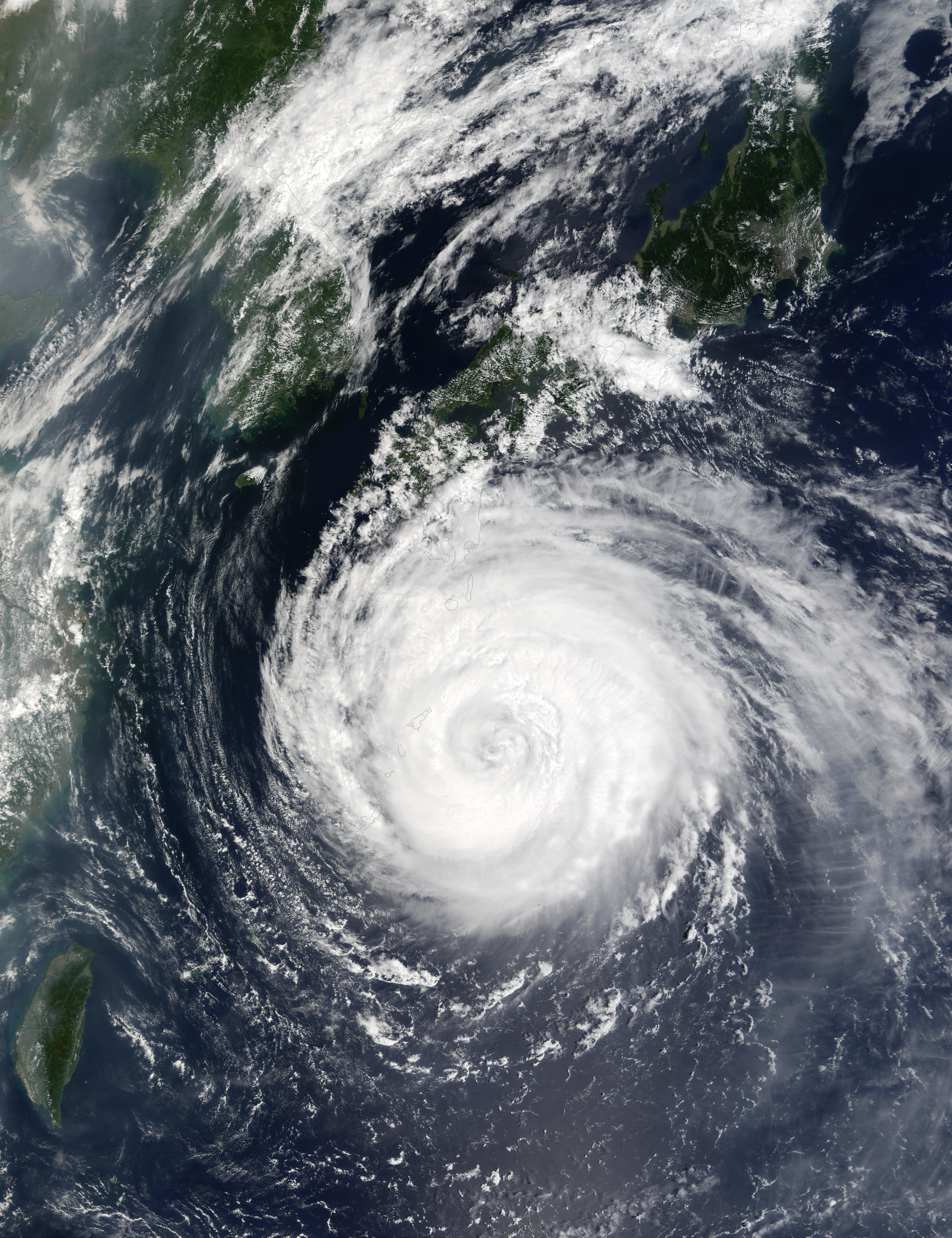
Rusa near the Ryukyu Islands on August 29

Although damage was heaviest in South Korea, Typhoon Rusa first affected Japan. The threat from the storm prompted Okinawa's government to cancel a disaster drill for the island. On the island, high seas from Rusa left two United States marines missing; a later news report included the two missing as storm-related fatalities. In the Amami Islands, Rusa destroyed six houses, forcing 38 people to evacuate. The storm left 20,000 people without power and cancelled several flights. Winds reached 104 km/h (65 mph) in Nomozaki, Nagasaki. Rains fell for seven days in the country, peaking at 902 mm (35.5 in) in Tokushima Prefecture. The heaviest of the precipitation fell in Nara Prefecture, where a station reported 84 mm (3.3 in) in one hour. At least 275 houses were flooded, and 137 houses were damaged. During its passage, Rusa injured 12 people, 4 seriously. The typhoon also produced light rain and high seas along the coast of Taiwan.

Before Rusa affected South Korea, the Korea Meteorological Administration (KMA) issued high sea warnings on August 29. Airports were closed in the southern portion of the country, and dams let out water to prevent excessive flooding. Typhoon Rusa affected much of South Korea with heavy rainfall and high winds. Jeju Island off the country's southern coast reported 660 mm (26 in) of rainfall, producing flash flooding that flooded cars. On the island, high winds downed trees and left 60,000 people without power. All lower and middle schools on the island were closed, and residents were stranded after officials halted ferry and airline service. On the South Korean mainland, winds reached as high as 180 km/h (110 mph). High amounts of rainfall were reported on Jeju Province and along the country's southern coast, although the heaviest rainfall was only reported in a small region. In Gangneung, located in the eastern portion of the country, severe thunderstorms developed due to high instability resulting from humid air from the east interacting with the Taebaek Mountains, producing high amounts of precipitation. The city reported the highest rainfall total in the country with 897.5 mm (35.33 in), of which 880 mm (35 in) was observed in one day. The total represented 62% of Gangneung's average yearly rainfall, and became the highest daily rainfall in the country's history, exceeding the previous record set in 1981 by 300 mm (12 in). In the South Korea interior, rainfall rates were considered a 1 in 200 year event.

Typhoon Rusa approaching South Korea on August 31

Damage in South Korea was estimated at $4.2 billion (₩5.15 trillion KRW). Damage was heaviest in Gangneung, where about 36,000 homes and 622 military buildings were flooded. At the airbase in Gangneung, floods submerged 16 jet fighters. Along the coast, high winds damaged 640 boats and about 200,000 marine buildings, and 265 industrial buildings were also damaged. The heavy rainfall left mudslides in the country, one of which covered ten cars in Gangneung. Flooding and the landslides disrupted the country's infrastructure; the storm destroyed 274 bridges and damaged roads and rails at 164 locations. Rusa killed 300,000 livestock and flooded 85,000 hectares (210,000 acres) of crop fields, representing 6% of the country's agricultural lands, mostly affecting fruit and vegetables. The storm caused the Vana H Cup KBC Augusta golf tournament to end early, and a stadium to be used for the 2002 Asian Games was damaged. Across the country, 88,625 people were forced to evacuate due to the typhoon, and 17,046 houses were damaged. High winds left 1.25 million people after blowing down 24,000 power lines. There were 213 deaths in the country, and another 33 were missing and presumed dead; This made Rusa the deadliest typhoon in the country in more than 43 years.

In neighboring North Korea, Rusa produced winds of 72 km/h (45 mph) and heavy rainfall reaching 700 mm (28 in) in mountainous areas of Kangwon Province; rainfall totaled 530 mm (21 in) in the county of Kosong. The rains caused flash flooding and increased surface runoff. This occurred about a month after similarly heavy rains caused severe damage in the country. The rains from Rusa damaged and flooded thousands of houses and many public buildings, and destroyed 86,000 tonnes of crop fields; the latter was most significant due to the country's ongoing famine conditions. Damage was heaviest in Kangwon Province, and the typhoon affected four provinces and one administrative city. More than 26,000 people were left homeless in the country, although advance warning allowed for evacuations. Rusa disrupted transportation by destroying 25 km (16 mi) of roads and 24 bridges; however, most of the damage was isolated to a small region. There were three deaths in North Korea.

The typhoon also affected the Russian Far East. On Sakhalin island, Rusa's remnants dropped heavy rainfall, the equivalence of two months average precipitation. The rains flooded 350 houses, but there were no deaths in the region.

== Aftermath ==
Following the storm, damaged buildings polluted rivers in South Korea with chemicals and heavy metals. The country utilized 30,000 soldiers to assist in cleaning up and repairing storm damage. President Kim Dae-jung authorized emergency funding for disaster aid. Much of Gangneung lost power and water; as a result, relief supplies were sent to the affected citizens. By ten days after Rusa struck the country, power lines were restored and transportation returned to normal. After an appeal to other residents in the country, the South Korea Red Cross chapter received $49 million in donations (₩58 billion won), mostly from the country's northwest portion. The agency provided 50,680 meals to 16,919 families, as well as clothing and cooking supplies. Residents in the country raised about $60 million (₩72.1 billion won) in disaster relief, the highest such total for a disaster in the nation. The Chinese Red Cross sent $20,000 to the South Korean Red Cross in the weeks after the storm. On September 13, the South Korean government declared 203 cities and counties as disaster zones, which entitled 8,714 families who sustained storm damage to receive government loans. The combined storm damage and floods preceding the storm caused the nation's economy to contract during the third quarter of 2002. The 2003 fiscal year reported a $300 million deficit for non-life insurance companies, mostly due to losses from the typhoon. Crop damage from Rusa caused the price of rice to increase to their highest levels since 1980. In the year after the storm, the South Korean government worked to reconstruct damaged roads and provided monthly assistance payments to families who lost their homes. However, many residents remained homeless and were residing in temporary shelters. The country's Habitat for Humanity built 69 houses for storm victims in 2003, although that was only for a small portion of the overall number of people affected. About a year after Rusa hit, Typhoon Maemi also struck South Korea with stronger winds, causing $3.74 billion in damage and 117 deaths. The damage total was less than from Rusa but was more significant to industrial areas.

In North Korea, the Red Cross provided relief supplies to residents affected by flooding. The agency's international disaster relief fund provided FR75,000 (2002 CHF (US$50,000). (Note: The total was originally reported in Swiss francs. Total converted by website from the Oanda Corporation.). Soldiers were used to assist in search and rescue missions and to repair damaged infrastructure. Due to storm damage, the Red Cross in North Korea distributed over 2.1 million water purification tablets and over 11,000 water containers. The agency also provided 32,753 blankets and 4,931 kitchen units. After the storm, people left homeless by the storm sought shelter with neighbors or in shelters. A South Korean dairy company donated 42,000 cans of baby formula to North Korea.

=== Retirement ===
Due to the storm's extensive damage in South Korea, the name Rusa was retired by the Typhoon Committee and would never be used again as a storm name in the Western Pacific basin. In 2004, it was replaced with the name Nuri, which was first used in the 2008 season.

== See also ==
- Tropical cyclones in 2002
- List of retired Pacific typhoon names

Other typhoons that took a similar track towards South Korea:

- Typhoon Sarah (1959)
- Typhoon Dinah (1987)
- Typhoon Saomai (2000)
- Typhoon Maemi (2003)
- Typhoon Nari (2007)
- Typhoon Soulik (2018)
- Typhoon Haishen (2020)
- Typhoon Hinnamnor (2022)
- Typhoon Khanun (2023)
