= Typhoon Soulik (2018) =

Pacific typhoon in 2018

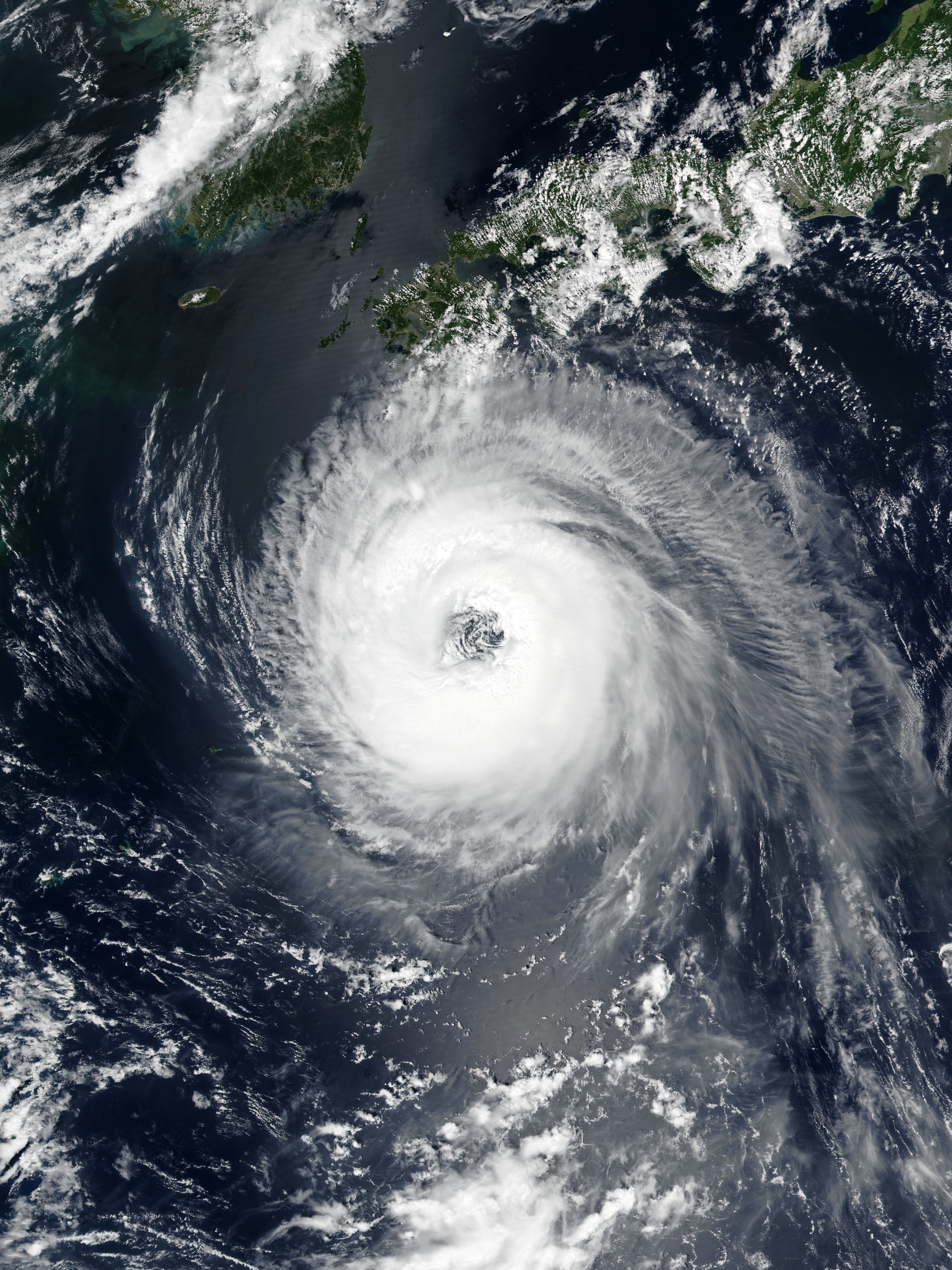
- Soulik at peak intensity on August 21

Meteorological history
- Formed: August 15, 2018
- Extratropical: August 24, 2018
- Dissipated: September 1, 2018

Very strong typhoon
- 10-minute sustained (JMA)
- Highest winds: 155 km/h (100 mph)
- Lowest pressure: 950 hPa (mbar); 28.05 inHg

Category 3-equivalent typhoon
- 1-minute sustained (SSHWS/JTWC)
- Highest winds: 195 km/h (120 mph)
- Lowest pressure: 942 hPa (mbar); 27.82 inHg

Overall effects
- Fatalities: 86 direct
- Damage: $125 million (2018 USD)
- Areas affected: Caroline Islands, Mariana Islands, Northeast China, Japan, Korean Peninsula, Russian Far East, Alaska
- IBTrACS
- Part of the 2018 Pacific typhoon season

Typhoon Soulik (Note: The name Soulik (Pohnpeian: Soulik, [sʲoulik]) was contributed by the Federated States of Micronesia and refers to a traditional title of Pohnpeian chiefs in Pohnpeian.) was an unusually large, and the deadliest typhoon to strike the Korean Peninsula as a tropical system since Tropical Storm Khanun in 2012. (Note: Typhoon Lionrock in 2016 was deadlier, but it affected the Korean Peninsula as an extratropical system.) Soulik formed from an area of low pressure on August 15, and was the twenty-ninth tropical depression, twentieth tropical storm, tenth severe tropical storm, and sixth typhoon of the 2018 Pacific typhoon season.

== Meteorological history ==
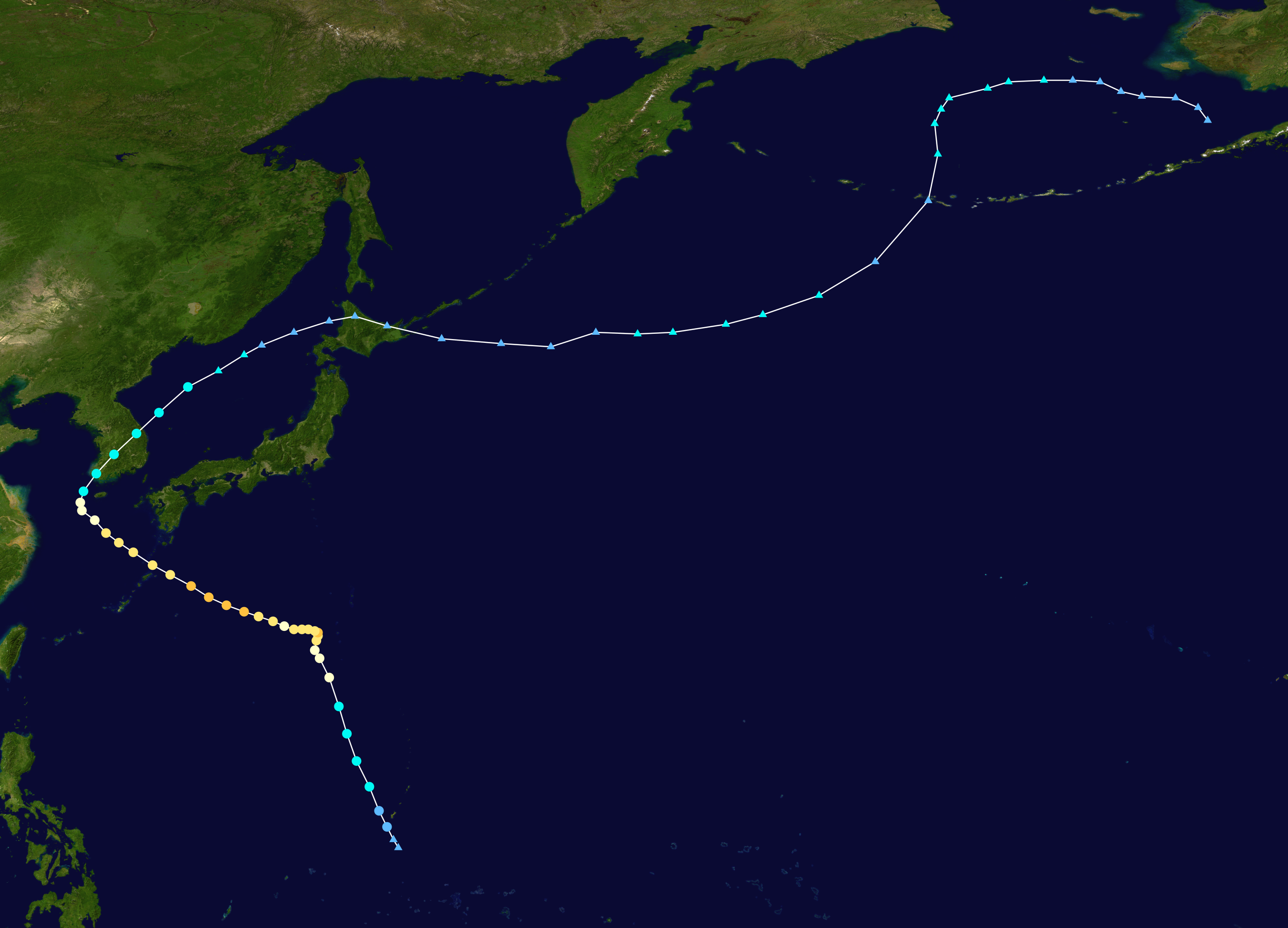
Map plotting the storm's track and intensity, according to the Saffir–Simpson scale Map key Saffir–Simpson scale Tropical depression (≤38 mph, ≤62 km/h) Tropical storm (39–73 mph, 63–118 km/h) Category 1 (74–95 mph, 119–153 km/h) Category 2 (96–110 mph, 154–177 km/h) Category 3 (111–129 mph, 178–208 km/h) Category 4 (130–156 mph, 209–251 km/h) Category 5 (≥157 mph, ≥252 km/h) Unknown Storm type Tropical cyclone Subtropical cyclone Extratropical cyclone, remnant low, tropical disturbance, or monsoon depression

On August 14 at 06:00 UTC, the Joint Typhoon Warning Center (JTWC) began monitoring an area of convection approximately 435 nautical miles (805 km; 500 mi) southeast of Andersen Air Force Base, assessing its development potential in the next day as low. The system was located in favorable conditions for development, though its low-level circulation remained elongated. Sea surface temperatures in the area were around 28–29 °C (82–84 °F). Convective bands began to form around the system, though they remained shallow; by 15:00 UTC, the JTWC upgraded its development potential in the next day to medium. Convection began to deepen and wrap into a consolidating low-level circulation, and at 22:30 UTC, the JTWC issued a Tropical Cyclone Formation Alert on the system.

On August 15 at 06:00 UTC, the Japan Meteorological Agency (JMA) began monitoring a tropical depression in the Philippine Sea. The depression continued north-northwestward, and at 15:00 UTC, the JTWC also upgraded the system to a tropical depression as it was located approximately 53 nautical miles (98 km; 61 mi) south-southwest of Hagatna, giving it the designation 22W. Deep convection was located southeast of a broad and elongated low-level circulation. Conditions remained favorable for further development as the depression began consolidating despite an exposed low-level circulation, and on August 16 at 00:00 UTC, the JMA upgraded the depression to a tropical storm, giving it the name Soulik. Convective banding began to wrap into the still-exposed low-level circulation, and at 03:00 UTC, the JTWC also upgraded Soulik to a tropical storm. Soulik then organized rapidly as its low-level circulation became more defined, and at 18:00 UTC, the JMA further upgraded Soulik to a severe tropical storm. By 21:00 UTC, a low-level eye feature appeared as its structure began to rapidly improve, and on August 17 at 03:00 UTC, the JTWC upgraded Soulik to a typhoon. At 12:00 UTC, the JMA also upgraded Soulik to a typhoon as it was steered by a mid-level subtropical high-pressure area.

Soulik then rapidly intensified into a severe typhoon, and on the next day, Soulik reached its peak intensity, with winds of 165 km/h (103 mph), and remained that intensity for several days. It also began to display some annular characteristics. After passing the Ryukyu Islands early on 22 August, the storm gradually weakened due to low sea-surface temperatures. On August 23, Soulik made landfall over Haenam County, South Jeolla Province of South Korea at around 23:00 KST (14:00 UTC).

== Impact ==
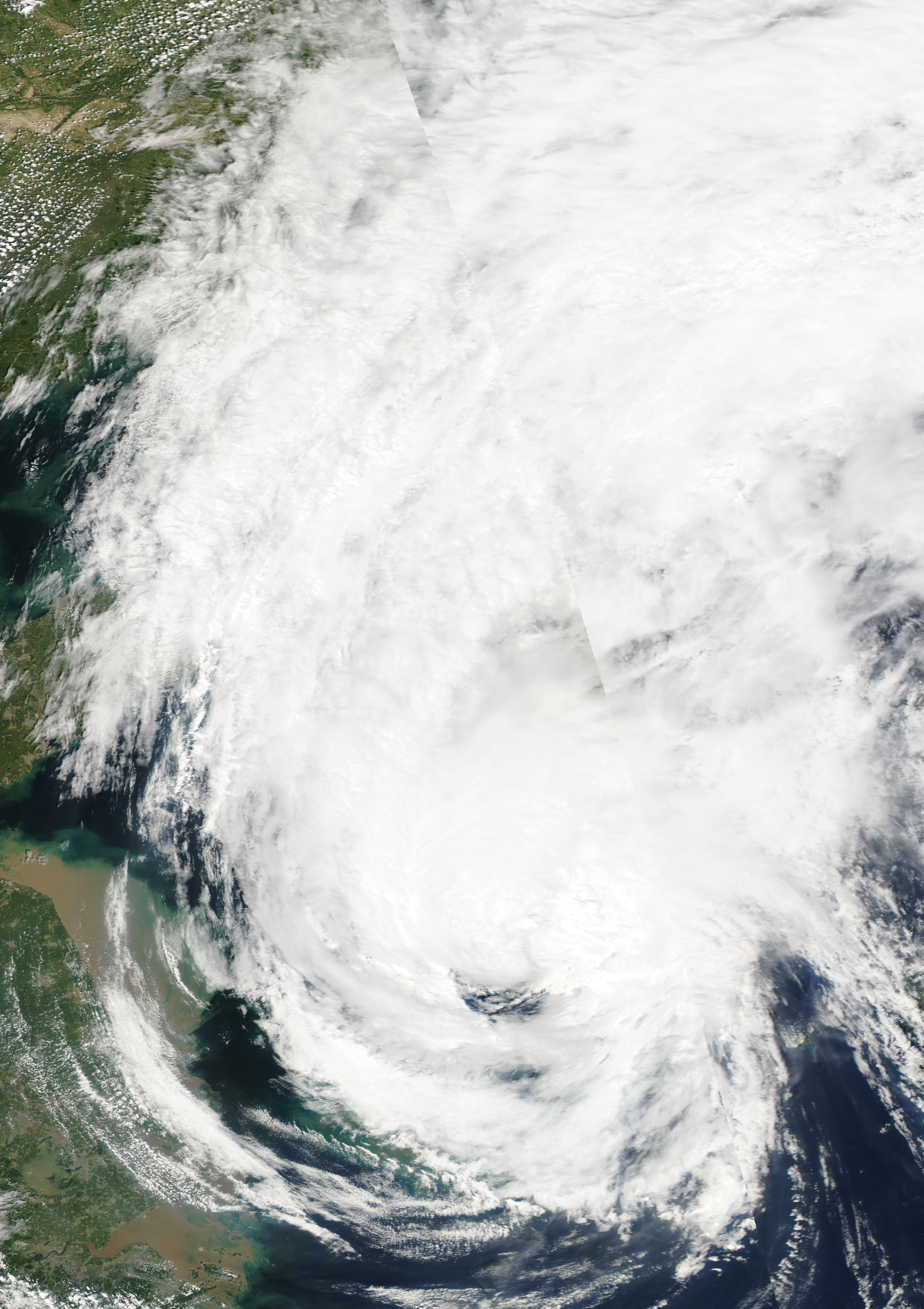
Soulik weakening while approaching Korea on August 23

Economic loss in Northeast China were counted to be CN¥550 million (US$79.9 million). Flooding in North Korea triggered by Soulik killed 86 people.

== See also ==
- Weather of 2018
- Tropical cyclones in 2018
- Other systems named Soulik
- Typhoon Rusa (2002) – Another typhoon that killed over 200 people in the Korean Peninsula
- Typhoon Kompasu (2010) – Another typhoon took a similar track
- Tropical Storm Khanun (2012)
- Typhoon Haishen (2020)
