= List of historical tropical cyclone names =

Tropical cyclones are named for historical reasons and so as to avoid confusion when communicating with the public, as more than one tropical cyclone can exist at a time. Names are drawn in order from predetermined lists. They are usually assigned to tropical cyclones with one-, three-, or ten-minute windspeeds of at least 65 km/h (40 mph). However, standards vary from basin to basin, with some tropical depressions named in the western Pacific whilst tropical cyclones have to have gale-force winds occurring more than halfway around the center within the Australian and southern Pacific regions.

The official practice of naming tropical cyclones started in 1945 within the western Pacific. Naming continued through the next few years, and in 1950, names also started to be assigned to tropical storms forming in the northern Atlantic Ocean. In the Atlantic, names were originally taken from the World War II version of the phonetic alphabet, but this was changed in 1953 to use lists of women's names which were created yearly. Around this time naming of tropical cyclones also began within the southern and central parts of the Pacific. However naming did not begin in the eastern Pacific until 1969, with the original naming lists designed to be used year after year in sequence. In 1960, naming also began in the southwestern Indian Ocean, and in 1963 the Philippine Meteorological Service (then known as the Philippine Weather Bureau and later reorganized as PAGASA) started assigning names to tropical cyclones that moved into or formed in their area of responsibility. Later in 1963, warning centers within the Australian region also commenced naming tropical cyclones. In 2004, the India Meteorological Department began naming cyclones that formed in the northern Indian Ocean, and in 2011, the Brazilian Navy Hydrographic Center started using a naming list to name tropical cyclones over the southern Atlantic Ocean.

== North Atlantic ==
By 1950, tropical cyclones that were judged by the US Weather Bureau to have intensified into a tropical storm started to be assigned names. Storms were originally named in alphabetical order using the World War II version of the Phonetic Alphabet. By 1952 a new phonetic alphabet had been developed and this led to confusion as some parties wanted to use the newer phonetic alphabet. In 1953, to alleviate any confusion, forecasters decided to use a set of 23 feminine names. After the 1953 Atlantic hurricane season, public reception to the idea seemed favorable, so the same list was adopted for the next year with one change: Gilda for Gail. However, after storms like Carol and Hazel got a lot of publicity during the 1954 season, forecasters agreed to develop a new set of names for 1955. However, before this could happen, a tropical storm was declared significant on January 2, 1955, and was named as Alice. The new set of names were developed and used in 1955 beginning with Brenda continuing through the alphabet to Zelda. For each season before 1960, a new set of names was developed. In 1960 forecasters decided to begin rotating names in a regular sequence and thus four alphabetical lists were established to be repeated every four years. The sets followed the example of the western Pacific typhoon naming lists and excluded names beginning with the letters Q, U, X, Y and Z. These four lists were used until 1972 when the National Oceanic and Atmospheric Administration (NOAA) replaced them with 9 lists designed to be used from 1972. Also in 1972, subtropical cyclones began receiving names from a separate naming list using the NATO phonetic alphabet. The policy at that time indicated that if a subtropical storm transitioned into a fully tropical system it would receive a second name from the main list, as seen with Hurricane Fran in 1973, which was initially referred to as Subtropical Storm Bravo. This practice was later discontinued after the 1973 season, with subtropical storms receiving numbers rather than names. In 1977, NOAA made the decision to relinquish control over the name selection by allowing a regional committee of the World Meteorological Organization to select the new sets of names, which would contain male names and some Spanish and French names, in order to reflect all the cultures and languages within the Atlantic Ocean. The World Meteorological Organization decided that the new lists of hurricane name would start to be used in 1979. Since 1979 the same lists have been used, but with names of significant tropical cyclones removed from the lists and replaced with new names. In 2002, subtropical cyclones started to be assigned names from the main list of names set up for that year. In 2005 and 2020, as all the names pre-selected for the season were exhausted, the contingency plan of using letters from the Greek alphabet as names had to be used. The original WMO policy of naming storms with Greek letters stated that if a storm was destructive enough to warrant retirement of the name, the Greek letter would be used again, but the name, with the year after it, would be included in the list of retired names; for example, "Alpha (2005)" would be listed under retired names, but Alpha could still be used again in later seasons. However, following the devastation wrought by hurricanes Eta and Iota in 2020, the former policy was rejected, and it was decided that Eta and Iota would be permanently retired, and that the Greek alphabet would be discontinued and replaced with an auxiliary name list, which has not yet been used.

=== Names used between 1950 and 1964 ===
1950	1951	1952	1953	1954	1955	1956	1957	1958	1959	1960	1961	1962	1963	1964
Able	Able	Able	Alice	Alice	Alice	Anna	Audrey	Alma	Arlene	Abby	Anna	Alma	Arlene	Abby
Baker	Baker	Baker	Barbara	Barbara	Brenda	Betsy	Bertha	Becky	Beulah	Brenda	Betsy	Becky	Beulah	Brenda
Charlie	Charlie	Charlie	Carol	Carol	Connie	Carla	Carrie	Cleo	Cindy	Cleo	Carla	Celia	Cindy	Cleo
Dog	Dog	Dog	Dolly	Dolly	Diane	Dora	Debbie	Daisy	Debra	Donna	Debbie	Daisy	Debra	Dora
Easy	Easy	Easy	Edna	Edna	Edith	Ethel	Esther	Ella	Edith	Ethel	Esther	Ella	Edith	Ethel
Fox	Fox	Fox	Florence	Florence	Flora	Flossy	Frieda	Fifi	Flora	Florence	Frances		Flora	Florence
George	George		Gail	Gilda	Gladys	Greta		Gerda	Gracie		Gerda		Ginny	Gladys
How	How		Hazel	Hazel	Hilda			Helene	Hannah		Hattie		Helena	Hilda
Item	Item		Irene		Ione			Ilsa	Irene		Inga			Isbell
Jig	Jig				Janet			Janice	Judith		Jenny			
King					Katie									
Love														
Mike														

=== Names used between 1965 and 1979 ===
1965	1966	1967	1968	1969	1970	1971	1972	1973	1974	1975	1976	1977	1978	1979
Anna	Alma	Arlene	Abby	Anna	Alma	Arlene	Alpha	Alice	Alma	Amy	Anna	Anita	Amelia	Ana
Betsy	Becky	Beulah	Brenda	Blanche	Becky	Beth	Agnes	Alfa	Becky	Blanche	Belle	Babe	Bess	Bob
Carol	Celia	Chloe	Candy	Camille	Celia	Chloe	Betty (Bravo)	Brenda	Carmen	Caroline	Candice	Clara	Cora	Claudette
Debbie	Dorothy	Doria	Dolly	Debbie	Dorothy	Doria	Carrie	Christine	Dolly	Doris	Dottie	Dorothy	Debra	David
Elena	Ella	Edith	Edna	Eve	Ella	Edith	Dawn	Delia	Elaine	Eloise	Emmy	Evelyn	Ella	Elena
	Faith	Fern	Frances	Francelia	Felice	Fern	Charlie	Ellen	Fifi	Faye	Frances	Frieda	Flossie	Frederic
	Greta	Ginger	Gladys	Gerda	Greta	Ginger	Delta	Fran (Bravo)	Gertrude	Gladys	Gloria		Greta	Gloria
	Hallie	Heidi		Holly		Heidi		Gilda		Hallie	Holly		Hope	Henri
	Inez			Inga		Irene							Irma	
	Judith			Jenny		Janice							Juliet	
	Kendra			Kara		Kristy							Kendra	
	Lois			Laurie		Laura								
				Martha										

=== Names used between 1980 and 1994 ===
1980	1981	1982	1983	1984	1985	1986	1987	1988	1989	1990	1991	1992	1993	1994
Allen	Arlene	Alberto	Alicia	Arthur	Ana	Andrew	Arlene	Alberto	Allison	Arthur	Ana	Andrew	Arlene	Alberto
Bonnie	Bret	Beryl	Barry	Bertha	Bob	Bonnie	Bret	Beryl	Barry	Bertha	Bob	Bonnie	Bret	Beryl
Charley	Cindy	Chris	Chantal	Cesar	Claudette	Charley	Cindy	Chris	Chantal	Cesar	Claudette	Charley	Cindy	Chris
Danielle	Dennis	Debby	Dean	Diana	Danny	Danielle	Dennis	Debby	Dean	Diana	Danny	Danielle	Dennis	Debby
Earl	Emily	Ernesto		Edouard	Elena	Earl	Emily	Ernesto	Erin	Edouard	Erika	Earl	Emily	Ernesto
Frances	Floyd			Fran	Fabian	Frances	Floyd	Florence	Felix	Fran	Fabian	Frances	Floyd	Florence
Georges	Gert			Gustav	Gloria			Gilbert	Gabrielle	Gustav	Grace		Gert	Gordon
Hermine	Harvey			Hortense	Henri			Helene	Hugo	Hortense			Harvey	
Ivan	Irene			Isidore	Isabel			Isaac	Iris	Isidore				
Jeanne	Jose			Josephine	Juan			Joan	Jerry	Josephine				
Karl	Katrina			Klaus	Kate			Keith	Karen	Klaus				
				Lili						Lili				
										Marco				
										Nana				

=== Names used between 1995 and 2008 ===
1995	1996	1997	1998	1999	2000	2001	2002	2003	2004	2005		2006	2007	2008
Allison	Arthur	Ana	Alex	Arlene	Alberto	Allison	Arthur	Ana	Alex	Arlene	Alpha	Alberto	Andrea	Arthur
Barry	Bertha	Bill	Bonnie	Bret	Beryl	Barry	Bertha	Bill	Bonnie	Bret	Beta	Beryl	Barry	Bertha
Chantal	Cesar	Claudette	Charley	Cindy	Chris	Chantal	Cristobal	Claudette	Charley	Cindy	Gamma	Chris	Chantal	Cristobal
Dean	Dolly	Danny	Danielle	Dennis	Debby	Dean	Dolly	Danny	Danielle	Dennis	Delta	Debby	Dean	Dolly
Erin	Edouard	Erika	Earl	Emily	Ernesto	Erin	Edouard	Erika	Earl	Emily	Epsilon	Ernesto	Erin	Edouard
Felix	Fran	Fabian	Frances	Floyd	Florence	Felix	Fay	Fabian	Frances	Franklin	Zeta	Florence	Felix	Fay
Gabrielle	Gustav	Grace	Georges	Gert	Gordon	Gabrielle	Gustav	Grace	Gaston	Gert		Gordon	Gabrielle	Gustav
Humberto	Hortense		Hermine	Harvey	Helene	Humberto	Hanna	Henri	Hermine	Harvey		Helene	Humberto	Hanna
Iris	Isidore		Ivan	Irene	Isaac	Iris	Isidore	Isabel	Ivan	Irene		Isaac	Ingrid	Ike
Jerry	Josephine		Jeanne	Jose	Joyce	Jerry	Josephine	Juan	Jeanne	Jose			Jerry	Josephine
Karen	Kyle		Karl	Katrina	Keith	Karen	Kyle	Kate	Karl	Katrina			Karen	Kyle
Luis	Lili		Lisa	Lenny	Leslie	Lorenzo	Lili	Larry	Lisa	Lee			Lorenzo	Laura
Marilyn	Marco		Mitch		Michael	Michelle		Mindy	Matthew	Maria			Melissa	Marco
Noel			Nicole		Nadine	Noel		Nicholas	Nicole	Nate			Noel	Nana
Opal						Olga		Odette	Otto	Ophelia			Olga	Omar
Pablo								Peter		Philippe				Paloma
Roxanne										Rita				
Sebastien										Stan				
Tanya										Tammy				
										Vince				
										Wilma				

=== Names used between 2009 and 2022 ===
2009	2010	2011	2012	2013	2014	2015	2016	2017	2018	2019	2020		2021	2022
Ana	Alex	Arlene	Alberto	Andrea	Arthur	Ana	Alex	Arlene	Alberto	Andrea	Arthur	Alpha	Ana	Alex
Bill	Bonnie	Bret	Beryl	Barry	Bertha	Bill	Bonnie	Bret	Beryl	Barry	Bertha	Beta	Bill	Bonnie
Claudette	Colin	Cindy	Chris	Chantal	Cristobal	Claudette	Colin	Cindy	Chris	Chantal	Cristobal	Gamma	Claudette	Colin
Danny	Danielle	Don	Debby	Dorian	Dolly	Danny	Danielle	Don	Debby	Dorian	Dolly	Delta	Danny	Danielle
Erika	Earl	Emily	Ernesto	Erin	Edouard	Erika	Earl	Emily	Ernesto	Erin	Edouard	Epsilon	Elsa	Earl
Fred	Fiona	Franklin	Florence	Fernand	Fay	Fred	Fiona	Franklin	Florence	Fernand	Fay	Zeta	Fred	Fiona
Grace	Gaston	Gert	Gordon	Gabrielle	Gonzalo	Grace	Gaston	Gert	Gordon	Gabrielle	Gonzalo	Eta	Grace	Gaston
Henri	Hermine	Harvey	Helene	Humberto	Hanna	Henri	Hermine	Harvey	Helene	Humberto	Hanna	Theta	Henri	Hermine
Ida	Igor	Irene	Isaac	Ingrid		Ida	Ian	Irma	Isaac	Imelda	Isaias	Iota	Ida	Ian
	Julia	Jose	Joyce	Jerry		Joaquin	Julia	Jose	Joyce	Jerry	Josephine		Julian	Julia
	Karl	Katia	Kirk	Karen		Kate	Karl	Katia	Kirk	Karen	Kyle		Kate	Karl
	Lisa	Lee	Leslie	Lorenzo			Lisa	Lee	Leslie	Lorenzo	Laura		Larry	Lisa
	Matthew	Maria	Michael	Melissa			Matthew	Maria	Michael	Melissa	Marco		Mindy	Martin
	Nicole	Nate	Nadine				Nicole	Nate	Nadine	Nestor	Nana		Nicholas	Nicole
	Otto	Ophelia	Oscar				Otto	Ophelia	Oscar	Olga	Omar		Odette	
	Paula	Philippe	Patty					Philippe		Pablo	Paulette		Peter	
	Richard	Rina	Rafael					Rina		Rebekah	Rene		Rose	
	Shary	Sean	Sandy							Sebastien	Sally		Sam	
	Tomas		Tony								Teddy		Teresa	
											Vicky		Victor	
											Wilfred		Wanda	

=== Names used between 2023 and 2026 ===
2023	2024	2025	2026
Arlene	Alberto	Andrea	Arthur
Bret	Beryl	Barry	Bertha
Cindy	Chris	Chantal	Cristobal
Don	Debby	Dexter	Dolly
Emily	Ernesto	Erin	Edouard
Franklin	Francine	Fernand	Fay
Gert	Gordon	Gabrielle	Gonzalo
Harold	Helene	Humberto	Hanna
Idalia	Isaac	Imelda	Isaias
Jose	Joyce	Jerry	Josephine
Katia	Kirk	Karen	
Lee	Leslie	Lorenzo	
Margot	Milton	Melissa	
Nigel	Nadine		
Ophelia	Oscar		
Philippe	Patty		
Rina	Rafael		
Sean	Sara		
Tammy			

== Eastern North Pacific ==
Within the Eastern Pacific basin between the western coasts of the Americas and 140°W the naming of tropical cyclones started in 1960, with four lists of female names initially designed to be used consecutively before being repeated. In 1965 after two lists of names had been used, it was decided to return to the top of the second list and start recycling the sets of names on an annual basis. In 1977, after protests by various women's rights groups, NOAA made the decision to relinquish control over the name selection by allowing a regional committee of the World Meteorological Organization (WMO) to select new sets of names. The WMO selected six lists of names which contained male names and rotated every six years. They also decided that the new lists of hurricane name would start to be used in 1978 which was a year earlier than the Atlantic. Since 1978 the same lists of names have been used, with names of significant tropical cyclones removed from the lists and replaced with new names. As in the Atlantic basin should the names preselected for the season be exhausted, the contingency plan of using Greek letters for names would be used. However unlike in the Atlantic basin the contingency plan has never had to be used, although in 1985 to avoid using the contingency plan, the letters X, Y, and Z were added to the lists. Since the contingency plan had to be used in the North Atlantic during 2005 there have been a few attempts to get rid of the Greek names as they are seen to be inconsistent with the standard naming convention used for tropical cyclones and are generally unknown and confusing to the public. In wake of the 2020 Atlantic hurricane season with Hurricane Iota and Hurricane Eta the World Meteorological Organization decided to stop using the Greek letter naming system in the Eastern Pacific as well despite never being used in the basin, it was replaced with a new supplemental naming system different from the Atlantic's list.

=== Names used between 1960 and 1974 ===
1960	1961	1962	1963	1964	1965	1966	1967	1968	1969	1970	1971	1972	1973	1974
Annette	Iva	Valerie	Emily	Natalie	Victoria	Adele	Agatha	Annette	Ava	Adele	Agatha	Annette	Ava	Aletta
Bonny	Joanne	Willa	Florence	Odessa	Wallie	Blanca	Bridget	Bonny	Bernice	Blanca	Bridget	Bonny	Bernice	Blanca
Celeste	Kathleen	Ava	Glenda	Prudence	Ava	Connie	Carlotta	Celeste	Claudia	Connie	Carlotta	Celeste	Claudia	Connie
Diana	Liza	Bernice	Hazel	Roslyn	Bernice	Dolores	Denise	Diana	Doreen	Dolores	Denise	Diana	Doreen	Dolores
Estelle	Madeline	Claudia	Irah	Silvia	Claudia	Eileen	Eleanor	Estelle	Emily	Eileen	Eleanor	Estelle	Emily	Eileen
Fernanda	Naomi	Doreen	Jennifer	Tillie	Doreen	Francesca	Francene	Fernanda	Florence	Francesca	Francene	Fernanda	Florence	Francesca
Gwen	Orla		Katherine		Emily	Gretchen	Georgette	Gwen	Glenda	Gretchen	Georgette	Gwen	Glenda	Gretchen
Hyacinth	Pauline		Lillian		Florence	Helga	Hilary	Hyacinth	Heather	Helga	Hilary	Hyacinth	Heather	Helga
	Rebecca		Mona		Glenda	Ione	Ilsa	Iva	Irah	Ione	Ilsa	Iva	Irah	Ione
	Simone				Hazel	Joyce	Jewel	Joanne	Jennifer	Joyce	Jewel	Joanne	Jennifer	Joyce
	Tara					Kirsten	Katrina	Kathleen		Kristen	Katrina	Kathleen	Katherine	Kirsten
						Lorraine	Lily	Liza		Lorraine	Lily	Liza	Lillian	Lorraine
						Maggie	Monica	Madeline		Maggie	Monica			Maggie
							Nanette	Naomi		Norma	Nanette			Norma
							Olivia	Orla		Orlene	Olivia			Orlene
							Priscilla	Pauline		Patricia	Priscilla			Patricia
							Ramona	Rebecca		Rosalie	Ramona			Rosalie
								Simone		Selma	Sharon			
								Tara						

=== Names used between 1975 and 1989 ===
1975	1976	1977	1978	1979	1980	1981	1982	1983	1984	1985	1986	1987	1988	1989
Agatha	Annette	Ava	Aletta	Andres	Agatha	Adrian	Aletta	Adolph	Alma	Andres	Agatha	Adrian	Aletta	Adolph
Bridget	Bonny	Bernice	Bud	Blanca	Blas	Beatriz	Bud	Barbara	Boris	Blanca	Blas	Beatriz	Bud	Barbara
Carlotta	Celeste	Claudia	Carlotta	Carlos	Celia	Calvin	Carlotta	Cosme	Cristina	Carlos	Celia	Calvin	Carlotta	Cosme
Denise	Diana	Doreen	Daniel	Dolores	Darby	Dora	Daniel	Dalilia	Douglas	Dolores	Darby	Dora	Daniel	Dalilia
Eleanor	Estelle	Emily	Emilia	Enrique	Estelle	Eugene	Emilia	Erick	Elida	Enrique	Estelle	Eugene	Emilia	Erick
Francene	Fernanda	Florence	Fico	Fefa	Frank	Fernanda	Fabio	Flossie	Fausto	Fefa	Frank	Fernanda	Fabio	Flossie
Georgette	Gwen	Glenda	Gilma	Guillermo	Georgette	Greg	Gilma	Gil	Genevieve	Guillermo	Georgette	Greg	Gilma	Gil
Hilary	Hyacinth	Heather	Hector	Hilda	Howard	Hilary	Hector	Henriette	Hernan	Hilda	Howard	Hilary	Hector	Henriette
Ilsa	Iva		Iva	Ignacio	Isis	Irwin	Iva	Ismael	Iselle	Ignacio	Isis	Irwin	Iva	Ismael
Jewel	Joanne		John	Jimena	Javier	Jova	John	Juliette	Julio	Jimena	Javier	Jova	John	Juliette
Katrina	Kathleen		Kristy		Kay	Knut	Kristy	Kiko	Kenna	Kevin	Kay	Knut	Kristy	Kiko
Lily	Liza		Lane		Lester	Lidia	Lane	Lorena	Lowell	Linda	Lester	Lidia	Lane	Lorena
Monica	Madeline		Miriam		Madeline	Max	Miriam	Manuel	Marie	Marty	Madeline	Max	Miriam	Manuel
Nanette	Naomi		Norman		Newton	Norma	Norman	Narda	Norbert	Nora	Newton	Norma		Narda
Olivia			Olivia			Otis	Olivia	Octave	Odile	Olaf	Orlene	Otis		Octave
Priscilla			Paul				Paul	Priscilla	Polo	Pauline	Paine	Pilar		Priscilla
			Rosa				Rosa	Raymond	Rachel	Rick	Roslyn	Ramon		Raymond
			Sergio				Sergio	Sonia	Simon	Sandra		Selma		
							Tara	Tico		Terry				
								Velma		Vivian				
								Winnie		Waldo				
										Xina				

=== Names used between 1990 and 2003 ===
1990	1991	1992		1993	1994	1995	1996	1997	1998	1999	2000	2001	2002	2003
Alma	Andres	Agatha	Madeline	Adrian	Aletta	Adolph	Alma	Andres	Agatha	Adrian	Aletta	Adolph	Alma	Andres
Boris	Blanca	Blas	Newton	Beatriz	Bud	Barbara	Boris	Blanca	Blas	Beatriz	Bud	Barbara	Boris	Blanca
Cristina	Carlos	Celia	Orlene	Calvin	Carlotta	Cosme	Cristina	Carlos	Celia	Calvin	Carlotta	Cosme	Cristina	Carlos
Douglas	Delores	Darby	Paine	Dora	Daniel	Dalila	Douglas	Dolores	Darby	Dora	Daniel	Dalila	Douglas	Dolores
Elida	Enrique	Estelle	Roslyn	Eugene	Emilia	Erick	Elida	Enrique	Estelle	Eugene	Emilia	Erick	Elida	Enrique
Fausto	Fefa	Frank	Seymour	Fernanda	Fabio	Flossie	Fausto	Felicia	Frank	Fernanda	Fabio	Flossie	Fausto	Felicia
Genevieve	Guillermo	Georgette	Tina	Greg	Gilma	Gil	Genevieve	Guillermo	Georgette	Greg	Gilma	Gil	Genevieve	Guillermo
Hernan	Hilda	Howard	Virgil	Hilary	Hector	Henriette	Hernan	Hilda	Howard	Hilary	Hector	Henriette	Hernan	Hilda
Iselle	Ignacio	Isis	Winifred	Irwin	Ileana	Ismael		Ignacio	Isis	Irwin	Ileana	Ivo	Iselle	Ignacio
Julio	Jimena	Javier	Xavier	Jova	John	Juliette		Jimena	Javier		John	Juliette	Julio	Jimena
Kenna	Kevin	Kay	Yolanda	Kenneth	Kristy			Kevin	Kay		Kristy	Kiko	Kenna	Kevin
Lowell	Linda	Lester	Zeke	Lidia	Lane			Linda	Lester		Lane	Lorena	Lowell	Linda
Marie	Marty			Max	Miriam			Marty	Madeline		Miriam	Manuel		Marty
Norbert	Nora			Norma	Norman			Nora			Norman	Narda		Nora
Odile					Olivia			Olaf			Olivia	Octave		Olaf
Polo					Paul			Pauline			Paul			Patricia
Rachel					Rosa			Rick			Rosa			
Simon														
Trudy														
Vance														

=== Names used between 2004 and 2018 ===
2004	2005	2006	2007	2008	2009	2010	2011	2012	2013	2014	2015	2016	2017	2018
Agatha	Adrian	Aletta	Alvin	Alma	Andres	Agatha	Adrian	Aletta	Alvin	Amanda	Andres	Agatha	Adrian	Aletta
Blas	Beatriz	Bud	Barbara	Boris	Blanca	Blas	Beatriz	Bud	Barbara	Boris	Blanca	Blas	Beatriz	Bud
Celia	Calvin	Carlotta	Cosme	Cristina	Carlos	Celia	Calvin	Carlotta	Cosme	Cristina	Carlos	Celia	Calvin	Carlotta
Darby	Dora	Daniel	Dalila	Douglas	Dolores	Darby	Dora	Daniel	Dalila	Douglas	Dolores	Darby	Dora	Daniel
Estelle	Eugene	Emilia	Erick	Elida	Enrique	Estelle	Eugene	Emilia	Erick	Elida	Enrique	Estelle	Eugene	Emilia
Frank	Fernanda	Fabio	Flossie	Fausto	Felicia	Frank	Fernanda	Fabio	Flossie	Fausto	Felicia	Frank	Fernanda	Fabio
Georgette	Greg	Gilma	Gil	Genevieve	Guillermo	Georgette	Greg	Gilma	Gil	Genevieve	Guillermo	Georgette	Greg	Gilma
Howard	Hilary	Hector	Henriette	Hernan	Hilda		Hilary	Hector	Henriette	Hernan	Hilda	Howard	Hilary	Hector
Isis	Irwin	Ileana	Ivo	Iselle	Ignacio		Irwin	Ileana	Ivo	Iselle	Ignacio	Ivette	Irwin	Ileana
Javier	Jova	John	Juliette	Julio	Jimena		Jova	John	Juliette	Julio	Jimena	Javier	Jova	John
Kay	Kenneth	Kristy	Kiko	Karina	Kevin		Kenneth	Kristy	Kiko	Karina	Kevin	Kay	Kenneth	Kristy
Lester	Lidia	Lane		Lowell	Linda			Lane	Lorena	Lowell	Linda	Lester	Lidia	Lane
	Max	Miriam		Marie	Marty			Miriam	Manuel	Marie	Marty	Madeline	Max	Miriam
	Norma	Norman		Norbert	Nora			Norman	Narda	Norbert	Nora	Newton	Norma	Norman
	Otis	Olivia		Odile	Olaf			Olivia	Octave	Odile	Olaf	Orlene	Otis	Olivia
		Paul		Polo	Patricia			Paul	Priscilla	Polo	Patricia	Paine	Pilar	Paul
		Rosa			Rick			Rosa	Raymond	Rachel	Rick	Roslyn	Ramon	Rosa
		Sergio							Sonia	Simon	Sandra	Seymour	Selma	Sergio
										Trudy		Tina		Tara
										Vance				Vicente
														Willa
														Xavier

=== Names used between 2019 and 2026 ===
2019	2020	2021	2022	2023	2024	2025	2026
Alvin	Amanda	Andres	Agatha	Adrian	Aletta	Alvin	Amanda
Barbara	Boris	Blanca	Blas	Beatriz	Bud	Barbara	Boris
Cosme	Cristina	Carlos	Celia	Calvin	Carlotta	Cosme	Cristina
Dalila	Douglas	Dolores	Darby	Dora	Daniel	Dalila	Douglas
Erick	Elida	Enrique	Estelle	Eugene	Emilia	Erick	Elida
Flossie	Fausto	Felicia	Frank	Fernanda	Fabio	Flossie	Fausto
Gil	Genevieve	Guillermo	Georgette	Greg	Gilma	Gil	Genevieve
Henriette	Hernan	Hilda	Howard	Hilary	Hector	Henriette	Hernan
Ivo	Iselle	Ignacio	Ivette	Irwin	Ileana	Ivo	Iselle
Juliette	Julio	Jimena	Javier	Jova	John	Juliette	Julio
Kiko	Karina	Kevin	Kay	Kenneth	Kristy	Kiko	Karina
Lorena	Lowell	Linda	Lester	Lidia	Lane	Lorena	Lowell
Mario	Marie	Marty	Madeline	Max		Mario	Marie
Narda	Norbert	Nora	Newton	Norma		Narda	Norbert
Octave	Odalys	Olaf	Orlene	Otis		Octave	Odalys
Priscilla	Polo	Pamela	Paine	Pilar		Priscilla	Polo
Raymond		Rick	Roslyn	Ramon		Raymond	Rachel
		Sandra				Sonia	Simon
		Terry					Trudy
							Vance

== Central North Pacific (Date Line to 140°W) ==
In 1950 a tropical cyclone that affected Hawaii was named Able, after a tropical cyclone had not affected Hawaii for a number of years. The system was also named Salome by the Air Weather Service Office in Guam, before it became widely known as Hurricane Hiki. Typhoon Olive of 1952 developed within the Central Pacific, but was not named until it had crossed the International Dateline and moved into the Western Pacific basin. During 1957, three other tropical cyclones developed in the Central Pacific and were named Kanoa, Della and Nina, by the Hawaiian military meteorological offices. It was subsequently decided that future tropical cyclones, would be named by borrowing names from the Western Pacific naming lists. Hawaiian names were reinstated for the lists during 1979, with 5 sets of names drafted using only the 12 letters of the Hawaiian alphabet, with the intent being to use the sets of names on an annual rotation basis. However, after no storms had developed in this region between 1979 and 1981, the annual lists were scrapped and replaced with four sets of names and designed to be used consecutively. Ahead of the 2007 hurricane season, the Central Pacific Hurricane Center (CPHC) introduced a revised set of Hawaiian names for the Central Pacific, after they had worked with the University of Hawaii Hawaiian studies department to ensure the correct meaning and appropriate historical and cultural use of the names.

Hiki—Salome (1950)	Kanoa (1957)	Della (1957)	Nina (1957)	Cora (1958)	Clara (1959)	Dot (1959)	Patsy (1959)	Wanda (1959)	Sarah (1967)
Dot (1970)	June (1972)	Ruby (1972)	Olive (1974)	Kate (1976)	Susan (1978)	Akoni (1982)	Ema (1982)	Hana (1982)	Iwa (1982)
Keli (1984)	Lala (1984)	Moke (1984)	Nele (1985)	Oka (1987)	Peke (1987)	Uleki (1988)	Wila (1988)	Aka (1990)	Ekeka (1992)
Hali (1992)	Iniki (1992)	Keoni (1993)	Li (1994)	Mele (1994)	Nona (1994)	Oliwa (1997)	Paka (1997)	Upana (2000)	Wene (2000)
Alika (2002)	Ele (2002)	Huko (2002)	Ioke (2006)	Kika (2008)	Lana (2009)	Maka (2009)	Neki (2009)	Omeka (2010)	Pewa (2013)
Unala (2013)	Wali (2014)	Ana (2014)	Ela (2015)	Halola (2015)	Iune (2015)	Kilo (2015)	Loke (2015)	Malia (2015)	Niala (2015)
Oho (2015)	Pali (2016)	Ulika (2016)	Walaka (2018)	Akoni (2019)	Ema (2019)	Hone (2024)	Iona (2025)	Keli (2025)	Lala (2026)
Moke (2026)	Nolo (2026)	Olana (2026)	Pena (2026)						

== Western North Pacific ==
In the Western North Pacific Ocean, there are two sets of names generally used. The first are the international names assigned to a tropical cyclone by the Japan Meteorological Agency (JMA) or the Joint Typhoon Warning Center (JTWC). The second set of names are local names assigned to a tropical cyclone by the Philippine Atmospheric, Geophysical and Astronomical Services Administration. This system often ends up with a tropical cyclone being assigned two names, should a tropical storm threaten the Philippines.

On January 1, 2000, the Japan Meteorological Agency, as the official Regional Specialized Meteorological Center, took over the naming of tropical cyclones in this basin. The names selected by the World Meteorological Organization's Typhoon Committee were from a pool of names submitted by the various countries that make up the Typhoon Committee.

=== Names used between 1945 and 1959 ===
1945	1946	1947	1948	1949	1950	1951	1952	1953	1954	1955	1956	1957	1958	1959	
Ann	Barbara	Anna	Karen	Carmen	Doris	Georgia	Charlotte	Irma	Elsie	Violet	Sarah	Rose	Ophelia	Ruby	Marge
Betty	Charlotte	Bernida	Lana	Della	Elsie	Hope	Dinah	Judy	Flossie	Wilda	Thelma	Shirley	Phyllis	Sally	Nora
Connie	Dolly	Carol	Mabel	Elaine	Flossie	Iris	Emma	Kit	Grace	Anita	Vera	Trix	Rita	Tilda	Opal
Doris	Elinor	Donna	Nadine	Faye	Grace	Joan	Freda	Lola	Helen	Billie	Wanda	Virginia	Susan	Violet	Patsy
Nancy	Ginny	Eileen	Ophelia	Gloria	Helene	Kate	Gilda	Mamie	Ida	Clara	Amy	Wendy	Tess	Wilda	Ruth
Opal	Ingrid	Faith	Pearl	Hester	Ida	Louise	Harriet	Nina	June	Dot	Babs	Agnes	Viola	Anita	Sarah
Peggy	Janie	Gwen	Rose	Irma	Jane	Marge	Ivy	Ophelia	Kathy	Ellen	Charlotte	Bess	Winnie	Billie	Thelma
Edna	Lilly	Helena	Annabell	Judith	Kezia	Nora	Jeanne	Phyllis	Lorna	Fran	Dinah	Carmen	Alice	Clara	Vera
Eva	Maggie	Inez	Bertha	Kitty	Lucretia	Ora	Karen	Rita	Marie	Georgia	Emma	Della	Betty	Dot	Wanda
Queenie	Opal	Joyce	Chris	Lise	Missatha	Pat	Lois	Susan	Nancy	Hope	Freda	Elaine	Cora	Ellen	Amy
Frances	Priscilla	Kathleen	Dolores	Madeline	Nancy	Ruth	Mary	Tess	Olga	Iris	Gilda	Faye	Doris	Fran	Babs
Grace	Querida	Laura	Eunice	Nelly	Ossia	Sarah	Nona	Viola	Pamela	Joan	Harriet	Gloria	Elsie	Georgia	Charlotte
Ruth	Alma	Mildred	Flo	Omelia	Petie	Thelma	Olive	Winnie	Ruby	Kate	Ivy	Hester	Flossie	Hope	Dinah
Susan	Betty	Nanette	Gertrude	Patricia	Ruby	Vera	Polly	Alice	Sally	Louise	Jean	Irma	Grace	Iris	Emma
Tess	Dianne	Olive	Hazel	Rena	Anita	Wanda	Rose	Betty	Tilda	Marge	Karen	Judy	Helen	Joan	Freda
Helen		Pauline	Ione	Allyn	Billie	Amy	Shirley	Cora		Nora	Lucille	Kit	Ida	Kate	Gilda
Ursula		Rosalind	Jackie	Betty	Clara	Babs	Trix	Doris		Opal	Mary	Lola	June	Louise	Harriet
Ida		Alice	Kit	Camilla	Delilah		Vae			Patsy	Nadine	Mamie	Kathy		
Verna		Beatrice	Libby		Ellen		Wilma			Ruth	Olive	Nina	Lorna		
Wanda		Cathy	Martha		Fran		Agnes				Polly		Marie		
Jean		Dora	Norma				Bess						Nancy		
Kate		Elnora	Olga				Carmen						Olga		
Louise		Flora	Pat				Della						Pamela		
Marge		Gladys	Rita				Elaine								
Yvonne		Hannah	Agnes				Faye								
Nora		Irene	Beverly				Gloria								
		Jean					Hester								

=== Names used between 1960 and 1974 ===
1960	1961	1962	1963	1964	1965	1966	1967	1968	1969	1970	1971	1972	1973	1974
Ivy	Rita	Fran	Olive	Tess	Patsy	Hester	Ruby	Jean	Phyllis	Nancy	Sarah	Kit	Wilda	Wanda
Jean	Susan	Georgia	Polly	Viola	Ruth	Irma	Sally	Kim	Rita	Olga	Thelma	Lola	Anita	Amy
Karen	Tess	Hope	Rose	Winnie	Sarah	Judy	Therese	Lucy	Susan	Pamela	Vera	Mamie	Billie	Babe
Lucille	Viola	Iris	Shirley	Alice	Thelma	Kit	Violet	Mary	Tess	Ruby	Wanda	Nina	Clara	Carla
Mary	Winnie	Joan	Trix	Betty	Vera	Lola	Wilda	Nadine	Viola	Sally	Amy	Ora	Dot	Dinah
Nadine	Alice	Kate	Virginia	Cora	Wanda	Mamie	Anita	Olive	Winnie	Therese	Babe	Phyllis	Ellen	Emma
Olive	Betty	Louise	Wendy	Doris	Amy	Nina	Billie	Polly	Alice	Violet	Carla	Rita	Fran	Freda
Polly	Cora	Marge	Agnes	Elsie	Babe	Ora	Clara	Rose	Betty	Wilda	Dinah	Susan	Georgia	Gilda
Rose	Doris	Nora	Bess	Flossie	Carla	Phyllis	Dot	Shirley	Cora	Anita	Emma	Tess	Hope	Harriet
Shirley	Elsie	Opal	Carmen	Grace	Dinah	Rita	Ellen	Trix	Doris	Billie	Freda	Viola	Iris	Ivy
Trix	Flossie	Patsy	Della	Helen	Emma	Susan	Fran	Virginia	Elsie	Clara	Gilda	Winnie	Joan	Jean
Virginia	Grace	Ruth	Elaine	Ida	Freda	Tess	Georgia	Wendy	Flossie	Dot	Harriet	Alice	Kate	Kim
Wendy	Helen	Sarah	Faye	June	Gilda	Viola	Hope	Agnes	Grace	Ellen	Ivy	Betty	Louise	Lucy
Agnes	Ida	Thelma	Gloria	Kathy	Harriet	Winnie	Iris	Bess	Helen	Fran	Jean	Cora	Marge	Mary
Bess	June	Vera	Hester	Lorna	Ivy	Alice	Joan	Carmen	Ida	Georgia	Kim	Doris	Nora	Nadine
Carmen	Kathy	Wanda	Irma	Marie	Jean	Betty	Kate	Della	June	Hope	Lucy	Elsie	Opal	Olive
Della	Lorna	Amy	Judy	Nancy	Kim	Cora	Louise	Elaine	Kathy	Iris	Mary	Flossie	Patsy	Polly
Elaine	Marie	Babe	Kit	Olga	Lucy	Doris	Marge	Faye	Lorna	Joan	Nadine	Grace	Ruth	Rose
Faye	Nancy	Carla	Lola	Pamela	Mary	Elsie	Nora	Gloria	Marie	Kate	Olive	Helen	Sarah	Shirley
Gloria	Olga	Dinah	Mamie	Ruby	Nadine	Flossie	Opal	Hester		Louise	Polly	Ida	Thelma	Trix
Hester	Pamela	Emma	Nina	Sally	Olive	Grace	Patsy	Irma		Marge	Rose	June	Vera	Virginia
Irma	Ruby	Freda	Ora	Tilda	Polly	Helen	Ruth	Judy		Nora	Shirley	Kathy		Wendy
Judy	Sally	Gilda	Phyllis	Violet	Rose	Ida	Sarah	Kit		Opal	Trix	Lorna		Agnes
Kit	Tilda	Harriet	Rita	Wilda	Shirley	June	Thelma	Lola		Patsy	Virginia	Marie		Bess
Lola	Violet	Ivy	Susan	Anita	Trix	Kathy	Vera	Mamie		Ruth	Wendy	Nancy		Carmen
Mamie	Wilda	Jean		Billie	Virginia	Lorna	Wanda	Nina			Agnes	Olga		Della
Nina	Anita	Karen		Clara	Wendy	Marie	Amy	Ora			Bess	Pamela		Elaine
Ophelia	Billie	Lucy		Dot	Agnes	Nancy	Babe				Carmen	Ruby		Faye
Phyllis	Clara	Mary		Ellen	Bess	Olga	Carla				Della	Sally		Gloria
	Dot	Nadine		Fran	Carmen	Pamela	Dinah				Elaine	Therese		Hester
	Ellen			Georgia	Della		Emma				Faye	Violet		Irma
				Hope	Elaine		Freda				Gloria			Judy
				Iris	Faye		Gilda				Hester			Kit
				Joan	Gloria		Harriet				Irma			
				Kate			Ivy				Judy			
				Louise										
				Marge										
				Nora										
				Opal										

=== Names used between 1975 and 1989 ===
1975	1976	1977	1978	1979	1980	1981	1982	1983	1984	1985	1986	1987	1988	1989
Lola	Kathy	Patsy	Nadine	Alice	Carmen	Freda	Mamie	Sarah	Vernon	Elsie	Judy	Orchid	Roy	Winona
Mamie	Lorna	Ruth	Olive	Bess	Dom	Gerald	Nelson	Tip	Wynne	Fabian	Ken	Percy	Susan	Andy
Nina	Marie	Sarah	Polly	Cecil	Ellen	Holly	Odessa	Vera	Alex	Gay	Lola	Ruth	Thad	Brenda
Ora	Nancy	Thelma	Rose	Dot	Forrest	Ike	Pat	Wayne	Betty	Hal	Mac	Sperry	Vanessa	Cecil
Phyllis	Olga	Vera	Shirley	Ellis	Georgia	June	Ruby	Abby	Cary	Irma	Nancy	Thelma	Warren	Dot
Rita	Pamela	Wanda	Trix	Faye	Herbert	Kelly	Skip	Ben	Dinah	Jeff	Owen	Vernon	Agnes	Ellis
Susan	Ruby	Amy	Virginia	Gordon	Ida	Lynn	Tess	Carmen	Ed	Kit	Peggy	Wynne	Bill	Faye
Tess	Sally	Babe	Wendy	Hope	Joe	Maury	Val	Dom	Freda	Lee	Roger	Alex	Clara	Gordon
Viola	Therese	Carla	Agnes	Irving	Kim	Nina	Winona	Ellen	Gerald	Mamie	Sarah	Betty	Doyle	Hope
Winnie	Violet	Dinah	Bess-Bonnie	Judy	Lex	Ogden	Andy	Forrest	Holly	Nelson	Tip	Cary	Elsie	Irving
Alice	Wilda	Emma	Carmen	Ken	Marge	Phyllis	Bess	Georgia	Ike	Odessa	Vera	Dinah	Fabian	Judy
Betty	Anita	Freda	Della	Lola	Norris	Roy	Cecil	Herbert	June	Pat	Wayne	Ed	Gay	Ken
Cora	Billie	Gilda	Elaine	Mac	Orchid	Susan	Dot	Ida	Kelly	Ruby	Abby	Freda	Hal	Lola
Doris	Clara	Harriet	Faye	Nancy	Percy	Thad	Ellis	Joe	Lynn	Skip	Ben	Gerald	Irma	Mac
Elsie	Dot	Ivy	Gloria	Owen	Ruth	Vanessa	Faye	Kim	Maury	Tess	Carmen	Holly	Jeff	Nancy
Flossie	Ellen	Jean	Hester	Pamela	Sperry	Warren	Gordon	Lex	Nina	Val	Dom	Ian	Kit	Owen
Grace	Fran	Kim	Irma	Roger	Thelma	Agnes	Hope	Marge	Ogden	Winona	Ellen	June	Lee	Peggy
Helen	Georgia	Lucy	Judy	Sarah	Vernon	Bill	Irving	Norris	Phyllis	Andy	Forrest	Kelly	Mamie	Roger
Ida	Hope	Mary	Kit	Tip	Wynne	Clara	Judy	Orchid	Roy	Brenda	Georgia	Lynn	Nelson	Sarah
June	Iris		Lola	Vera	Alex	Doyle	Ken	Percy	Susan	Cecil	Herbert	Maury	Odessa	Tip
	Joan		Mamie	Wayne	Betty	Elsie	Lola	Ruth	Thad	Dot	Ida	Nina	Pat	Vera
	Kate		Nina	Abby	Cary	Fabian	Mac	Sperry	Vanessa	Ellis	Joe	Ogden	Ruby	Wayne
	Louise		Ora	Ben	Dinah	Gay	Nancy	Thelma	Warren	Faye	Kim	Phyllis	Skip	Angela
	Marge		Phyllis		Ed	Hazen	Owen		Agnes	Gordon	Lex		Tess	Brian
	Nora		Rita			Irma	Pamela		Bill	Hope	Marge		Val	Colleen
	Opal		Tess			Jeff	Roger		Clara	Irving	Norris			Dan
			Viola			Kit			Doyle					Elsie
			Winnie			Lee								Forrest
														Gay
														Hunt
														Irma
														Jack

=== Names used between 1990 and 2004 ===
1990	1991	1992	1993	1994	1995	1996	1997	1998	1999	2000	2001	2002	2003	2004
Koryn	Sharon	Axel	Irma	Owen	Chuck	Ann	Hannah	Nichole	Hilda	Damrey	Cimaron	Tapah	Yanyan	Sudal
Lewis	Tim	Bobbie	Jack	Page	Deanna	Bart	Isa	Otto	Iris	Longwang	Chebi	Mitag	Kujira	Nida
Marian	Vanessa	Chuck	Koryn	Russ	Eli	Cam	Jimmy	Penny	Jacob	Kirogi	Durian	Hagibis	Chan-hom	Omais
Nathan	Walt	Deanna	Lewis	Sharon	Faye	Dan	Kelly	Rex	Kate	Kai-tak	Utor	Noguri	Linfa	Conson
Ofelia	Yunya	Eli	Marian	Tim	Gary	Eve	Levi	Stella	Leo	Tembin	Trami	Rammasun	Nangka	Chanthu
Percy	Zeke	Faye	Nathan	Vanessa	Helen	Frankie	Marie	Todd	Maggie	Bolaven	Kong-rey	Chataan	Soudelor	Dianmu
Robyn	Amy	Gary	Ofelia	Walt	Irving	Gloria	Nestor	Vicki	Neil	Chanchu	Yutu	Halong	Imbudo	Mindulle
Steve	Brendan	Helen	Percy	Yunya	Janis	Herb	Opal	Waldo	Olga	Jelawat	Toraji	Nakri	Koni	Tingting
Tasha	Caitlin	Irving	Robyn	Zeke	Kent	Ian	Peter	Yanni	Paul	Ewiniar	Man-yi	Fengshen	Morakot	Kompasu
Vernon	Doug	Janis	Steve	Amy	Lois	Joy	Rosie	Zeb	Rachel	Bilis	Usagi	Kalmaegi	Etau	Namtheun
Winona	Ellie	Kent	Tasha	Brendan	Mark	Kirk	Scott	Alex	Sam	Kaemi	Pabuk	Fung-wong	Vamco	Malou
Yancy	Fred	Lois	Vernon	Caitlin	Nina	Lisa	Tina	Babs	Tanya	Prapiroon	Wutip	Kammuri	Krovanh	Meranti
Zola	Gladys	Mark	Winona	Doug	Oscar	Marty	Victor	Chip	Virgil	Maria	Sepat	Phanfone	Dujuan	Rananim
Abe	Harry	Nina	Yancy	Ellie	Polly	Niki	Winnie	Dawn	Wendy	Saomai	Fitow	Vongfong	Maemi	Malakas
Becky	Ivy	Omar	Zola	Fred	Ryan	Orson	Yule	Elvis	York	Bopha	Danas	Rusa	Choi-wan	Megi
Cecil	Joel	Polly	Abe	Gladys	Sibyl	Piper	Zita	Faith	Zia	Wukong	Nari	Sinlaku	Koppu	Chaba
Dot	Kinna	Ryan	Becky	Harry	Ted	Rick	Amber	Gil	Ann	Sonamu	Vipa	Hagupit	Ketsana	Aere
Ed	Luke	Sibyl	Cecil	Ivy	Val	Sally	Bing		Bart	Shanshan	Francisco	Changmi	Parma	Songda
Flo	Mireille	Ted	Dot	Joel	Ward	Tom	Cass		Cam	Yagi	Lekima	Mekkhala	Melor	Sarika
Gene	Nat	Val	Ed	Kinna	Yvette	Violet	David		Dan	Xangsane	Krosa	Higos	Nepartak	Haima
Hattie	Orchid	Ward	Flo	Luke	Zack	Willie	Ella		Eve	Bebinca	Haiyan	Bavi	Lupit	Meari
Ira	Pat	Yvette	Gene	Melissa	Angela	Yates	Fritz		Frankie	Rumbia	Podul	Maysak		Ma-on
Jeana	Ruth	Zack	Hattie	Nat	Brian	Zane	Ginger		Gloria	Soulik	Lingling	Haishen		Tokage
Kyle	Seth	Angela	Ira	Orchid	Colleen	Abel	Hank				Kajiki	Pongsona		Nock-ten
Lola	Thelma	Brian	Jeana	Pat	Dan	Beth	Ivan				Faxai			Muifa
Mike	Verne	Colleen	Kyle	Ruth		Carlo	Joan				Vamei			Merbok
Nell	Wilda	Dan	Lola	Seth		Dale	Keith							Nanmadol
Owen	Yuri	Elsie	Manny	Teresa		Ernie	Linda							Talas
Page	Zelda	Forrest	Nell	Verne		Fern	Mort							Noru
Russ		Gay		Wilda		Greg								
		Hunt		Yuri										
				Zelda										
				Axel										
				Bobbie										

=== Names used between 2005 and 2018 ===
2005	2006	2007	2008	2009	2010	2011	2012	2013	2014	2015	2016	2017	2018
Kulap	Chanchu	Kong-rey	Neoguri	Kujira	Omais	Aere	Pakhar	Sonamu	Lingling	Mekkhala	Nepartak	Muifa	Bolaven
Roke	Jelawat	Yutu	Rammasun	Chan-hom	Conson	Songda	Sanvu	Shanshan	Kajiki	Higos	Lupit	Merbok	Sanba
Sonca	Ewiniar	Toraji	Matmo	Linfa	Chanthu	Sarika	Mawar	Yagi	Faxai	Bavi	Mirinae	Nanmadol	Jelawat
Nesat	Bilis	Man-yi	Halong	Nangka	Dianmu	Haima	Guchol	Leepi	Peipah	Maysak	Nida	Talas	Ewiniar
Haitang	Kaemi	Usagi	Nakri	Soudelor	Mindulle	Meari	Talim	Bebinca	Tapah	Haishen	Omais	Noru	Maliksi
Nalgae	Prapiroon	Pabuk	Fengshen	Molave	Lionrock	Ma-on	Doksuri	Rumbia	Mitag	Noul	Conson	Kulap	Gaemi
Banyan	Maria	Wutip	Kalmaegi	Goni	Kompasu	Tokage	Khanun	Soulik	Hagibis	Dolphin	Chanthu	Roke	Prapiroon
Washi	Saomai	Sepat	Fung-wong	Morakot	Namtheun	Nock-ten	Vicente	Cimaron	Neoguri	Kujira	Dianmu	Sonca	Maria
Matsa	Bopha	Fitow	Kammuri	Etau	Malou	Muifa	Saola	Jebi	Rammasun	Chan-hom	Mindulle	Nesat	Son-Tinh
Sanvu	Wukong	Danas	Phanfone	Vamco	Meranti	Merbok	Damrey	Mangkhut	Matmo	Linfa	Lionrock	Haitang	Ampil
Mawar	Sonamu	Nari	Vongfong	Krovanh	Fanapi	Nanmadol	Haikui	Utor	Halong	Nangka	Kompasu	Nalgae	Wukong
Guchol	Shanshan	Wipha	Nuri	Dujuan	Malakas	Talas	Kirogi	Trami	Nakri	Soudelor	Namtheun	Banyan	Jongdari
Talim	Yagi	Francisco	Sinlaku	Mujigae	Megi	Noru	Kai-tak	Kong-rey	Fengshen	Molave	Malou	Hato	Shanshan
Nabi	Xangsane	Lekima	Hagupit	Koppu	Chaba	Kulap	Tembin	Yutu	Kalmaegi	Goni	Meranti	Pakhar	Yagi
Khanun	Bebinca	Krosa	Jangmi	Choi-wan		Roke	Bolaven	Toraji	Fung-wong	Atsani	Rai	Sanvu	Leepi
Vicente	Rumbia	Haiyan	Mekkhala	Ketsana		Sonca	Sanba	Man-yi	Kammuri	Etau	Malakas	Mawar	Bebinca
Saola	Soulik	Podul	Higos	Parma		Nesat	Jelawat	Usagi	Phanfone	Vamco	Megi	Guchol	Rumbia
Damrey	Cimaron	Lingling	Bavi	Melor		Haitang	Ewiniar	Pabuk	Vongfong	Krovanh	Chaba	Talim	Soulik
Longwang	Chebi	Kajiki	Maysak	Nepartak		Nalgae	Maliksi	Wutip	Nuri	Dujuan	Aere	Doksuri	Cimaron
Kirogi	Durian	Faxai	Haishen	Lupit		Banyan	Gaemi	Sepat	Sinlaku	Mujigae	Songda	Khanun	Jebi
Kai-tak	Utor	Peipah	Noul	Mirinae		Washi	Prapiroon	Fitow	Hagupit	Choi-wan	Sarika	Lan	Mangkhut
Tembin	Trami	Tapah	Dolphin	Nida			Maria	Danas	Jangmi	Koppu	Haima	Saola	Barijat
Bolaven		Mitag					Son-Tinh	Nari		Champi	Meari	Damrey	Trami
		Hagibis					Bopha	Wipha		In-fa	Ma-on	Haikui	Kong-rey
							Wukong	Francisco		Melor	Tokage	Kirogi	Yutu
								Lekima			Nock-ten	Kai-tak	Toraji
								Krosa				Tembin	Man-yi
								Haiyan					Usagi
								Podul					

=== Names used between 2019 and 2026 ===
2019	2020	2021	2022	2023	2024	2025	2026
Pabuk	Vongfong	Dujuan	Malakas	Sanvu	Ewiniar	Wutip	Nokaen
Wutip	Nuri	Surigae	Megi	Mawar	Maliksi	Sepat	Penha
Sepat	Sinlaku	Choi-wan	Chaba	Guchol	Gaemi	Mun	Nuri
Mun	Hagupit	Koguma	Aere	Talim	Prapiroon	Danas	Sinlaku
Danas	Jangmi	Champi	Songda	Doksuri	Maria	Nari	Hagupit
Nari	Mekkhala	In-fa	Trases	Khanun	Son-Tinh	Wipha	Jangmi
Wipha	Higos	Cempaka	Mulan	Lan	Ampil	Francisco	Mekkhala
Francisco	Bavi	Nepartak	Meari	Saola	Wukong	Co-May	Higos
Lekima	Maysak	Lupit	Ma-on	Damrey	Jongdari	Krosa	Bavi
Krosa	Haishen	Mirinae	Tokage	Haikui	Shanshan	Bailu	Maysak
Bailu	Noul	Nida	Hinnamnor	Kirogi	Yagi	Podul	Haishen
Podul	Dolphin	Omais	Muifa	Yun-yeung	Leepi	Lingling	Noul
Lingling	Kujira	Conson	Merbok	Koinu	Bebinca	Kajiki	Dolphin
Kajiki	Chan-hom	Chanthu	Nanmadol	Bolaven	Pulasan	Nongfa	Kujira
Faxai	Linfa	Dianmu	Talas	Sanba	Soulik	Peipah	Chan-hom
Peipah	Nangka	Mindulle	Noru	Jelawat	Cimaron	Tapah	Peilou
Tapah	Saudel	Lionrock	Kulap		Jebi	Mitag	Nangka
Mitag	Molave	Kompasu	Roke		Krathon	Ragasa	Saudel
Hagibis	Goni	Namtheun	Sonca		Barijat	Neoguri	Narra
Neoguri	Atsani	Malou	Nesat		Trami	Bualoi	Gaenari
Bualoi	Etau	Nyatoh	Haitang		Kong-rey	Matmo	Atsani
Matmo	Vamco	Rai	Nalgae		Yinxing	Halong	Etau
Halong	Krovanh		Banyan		Toraji	Nakri	Bang-Lang
Nakri			Yamaneko		Man-yi	Fengshen	Krovanh
Fengshen			Pakhar		Usagi	Kalmaegi	Dujuan
Kalmaegi					Pabuk	Fung-wong	Surigae
Fung-wong						Koto	Choi-wan
Kammuri							Koguma
Phanfone							Champi
							In-fa
							Cempaka

== Philippines ==
Since 1963, the PAGASA (Philippine Atmospheric, Geophysical and Astronomical Services Administration) and its predecessor, the Philippine Weather Bureau, have assigned their own names to typhoons that pass through its area of responsibility. Unlike the World Meteorological Organization's standard of assigning names to tropical cyclones when they reach wind-speeds of 65 km/h (40 mph), PAGASA assigns a name to a tropical depression when they either form or move into their area of responsibility. Four sets of tropical cyclone names are rotated annually with typhoon names stricken from the list should they do more than 1 billion pesos worth of damage to the Philippines and/or cause 300 or more deaths. Should the list of names for a given year prove insufficient, names are taken from an auxiliary list.

=== Names used between 1963 and 1974 ===
1963	1964		1965	1966	1967	1968	1969	1970	1971		1972	1973	1974
Auring	Asiang	Toyang	Atring	Atang	Auring	Asiang	Atring	Atang	Auring	Sisang	Asiang	Atring	Atang
Bebeng	Biring	Undang	Bining	Bising	Bebeng	Biring	Bining	Bising	Bebeng	Trining	Biring	Bining	Bising
Karing	Konsing	Welpring	Kuring	Klaring	Karing	Konsing	Kuring	Klaring	Karing	Uring	Konsing	Kuring	Klaring
Diding	Dading	Yoning	Daling	Deling	Diding	Didang	Daling	Deling	Diding	Warling	Didang	Daling	Deling
Etang	Edeng	Aring	Elang	Emang	Etang	Edeng	Elang	Emang	Etang	Yayang	Edeng	Elang	Emang
Gening	Gloring	Basiang	Goring	Gading	Gening	Gloring	Goring	Gading	Gening	Ading	Gloring	Goring	Gading
Herming	Huaning	Kayang	Huling	Heling	Herming	Huaning	Huling	Heling	Herming	Barang	Huaning	Huling	Heling
Ising	Isang	Dorang	Ibiang	Iliang	Ising	Iniang	Ibiang	Iliang	Ising	Krising	Isang	Ibiang	Iliang
Luding	Lusing	Enang	Luming	Loleng	Luding	Lusing	Luming	Loleng	Luding	Dadang	Lusing	Luming	Loleng
Mameng	Maring	Grasing	Miling	Miding	Mameng	Maring	Miling	Miding	Mameng	Erling	Maring	Miling	Miding
Neneng	Nitang	Hobing	Narsing	Norming	Neneng	Nitang	Narsing	Norming	Neneng	Goying	Nitang	Narsing	Norming
Oniang	Osang	Ining	Openg	Oyang	Oniang	Osang	Openg	Oyang	Oniang	Hobing	Osang	Openg	Oyang
Pepang	Paring	Liling	Pining	Pitang	Pepang	Paring	Pining	Pitang	Pepang	Ining	Paring		Pasing
Rosing	Reming	Moning	Rubing	Ruping	Rosing	Reming	Rubing	Ruping	Rosing		Reming		Ruping
Sisang	Seniang	Naning	Saling	Sening	Sisang	Seniang	Saling	Sening			Seniang		Susang
Trining		Oring	Tasing	Titang	Trining	Toyang		Titang			Toyang		Tering
			Unding	Uding	Uring			Uding			Undang		Uding
			Walding	Wening	Welming			Wening					Wening
			Yeyeng	Yoling	Yayang			Yoling					Yaning
			Anding	Aning	Ading			Aning					Aning
			Binang		Barang			Bidang					Bidang
													Kading
													Delang

=== Names used between 1975 and 1987 ===
1975	1976	1977	1978	1979	1980	1981	1982	1983	1984	1985	1986	1987
Auring	Asiang	Atring	Atang	Auring	Asiang	Atring	Akang	Auring	Asiang	Atring	Akang	Auring
Bebeng	Biring	Bining	Bising	Bebeng	Biring	Bining	Bising	Bebeng	Biring	Bining	Bising	Bebeng
Karing	Konsing	Kuring	Klaring	Karing	Konsing	Kuring	Klaring	Katring	Konsing	Kuring	Klaring	Katring
Diding	Didang	Daling	Deling	Diding	Ditang	Daling	Deling	Diding	Ditang	Daling	Deling	Diding
Etang	Edeng	Elang	Emang	Etang	Edeng	Elang	Emang	Etang	Edeng	Elang	Emang	Etang
Gening	Gloring	Goring	Gading	Gening	Gloring	Goring	Gading	Gening	Gloring	Goring	Gading	Gening
Herming	Huaning	Huling	Heling	Herming	Huaning	Huling	Heling	Herming	Huaning	Huling	Heling	Herming
Ising	Isang	Ibiang	Iliang	Ising	Isang	Ibiang	Iliang	Ising	Isang	Ibiang	Iliang	Ising
Luding	Lusing	Luming	Loleng	Luding	Lusing	Luming	Loleng	Luding	Lusing	Luming	Loleng	Luding
Mameng	Maring	Miling	Miding	Mameng	Maring	Miling	Miding	Mameng	Maring	Miling	Miding	Mameng
Neneng	Nitang	Narsing	Norming	Neneng	Nitang	Narsing	Norming	Neneng	Nitang	Narsing	Norming	Neneng
Oniang	Osang	Openg	Oyang	Oniang	Osang	Openg	Oyang	Oniang	Osang	Openg	Oyang	Oniang
Pepang	Paring	Pining	Pasing	Pepang	Paring	Pining	Pasing	Pepang	Paring	Pining	Pasing	Pepang
Rosing	Reming	Rubing	Ruping	Rosing	Reming	Rubing	Ruping	Rosing	Reming	Rubing	Ruping	Rosing
Sisang	Seniang	Saling	Susang	Sisang	Seniang	Saling	Susang	Sisang	Seniang	Saling	Susang	Sisang
	Toyang	Tasing	Tering	Trining	Toyang	Tasing	Tering	Trining	Toyang	Tasing	Tering	Trining
	Undang	Unding	Uding	Uring	Undang	Unsing	Uding	Uring	Undang	Unsing	Uding	
	Welpring	Walding	Weling	Warling	Welpring	Walding	Weling	Warling	Welpring		Weling	
	Yoning	Yeyeng	Yaning	Yayang	Yoning	Yeyeng	Yaning	Yayang	Yoning		Yaning	
	Aring		Aning	Ading	Aring	Anding	Aning	Ading	Aring		Aning	
	Basiang		Bidang	Barang	Basiang	Binang	Bidang	Barang			Bidang	
	Kayang		Kading	Krising	Kayang	Kadiang		Krising				
			Delang		Dorang	Dinang		Dadang				
			Esang									
			Garding									

=== Names used between 1988 and 2000 ===
1988	1989	1990	1991	1992	1993		1994		1995	1996	1997	1998	1999	2000
Asiang	Atring	Akang	Auring	Asiang	Atring	Walding	Akang	Ritang	Auring	Asiang	Atring	Akang	Auring	Asiang
Biring	Bining	Bising	Bebeng	Biring	Bining	Yeyeng	Bising	Susang	Bebeng	Biring	Bining	Bising	Bebeng	Biring
Konsing	Kuring	Klaring	Karing	Konsing	Kuring	Anding	Klaring	Tering	Karing	Konsing	Kuring	Klaring	Karing	Konsing
Ditang	Daling	Deling	Diding	Ditang	Daling	Binang	Deling	Uding	Diding	Ditang	Daling	Deling	Diding	Ditang
Edeng	Elang	Emang	Etang	Edeng	Elang	Kadiang	Emang	Weling	Etang	Edeng	Elang	Emang	Etang	Edeng
Gloring	Goring	Gading	Gening	Gloring	Goring	Dinang	Gading	Yaning	Gening	Gloring	Goring	Gading	Gening	Gloring
Huaning	Huling	Heling	Helming	Huaning	Huling	Epang	Heling	Aning	Helming	Huaning	Huling	Heling	Helming	Huaning
Isang	Ibiang	Iliang	Ising	Isang	Ibiang	Gundang	Iliang	Bidang	Ising	Isang	Ibiang	Iliang	Ising	Isang
Lusing	Luming	Loleng	Luding	Lusing	Luming	Husing	Loleng	Katring	Luding	Lusing	Luming	Loleng	Luding	Lusing
Maring	Miling	Miding	Mameng	Maring	Miling	Indang	Miding	Delang	Mameng	Maring	Miling	Miding	Mameng	Maring
Ningning	Narsing	Norming	Neneng	Ningning	Narsing	Luring	Norming	Esang	Neneng	Ningning	Narsing	Norming	Neneng	Ningning
Osang	Openg	Oyang	Oniang	Osang	Openg	Monang	Oyang	Garding	Oniang	Osang	Openg		Oniang	Osang
Paring	Pining	Pasing	Pepang	Paring	Pining	Naning	Pasing		Pepang	Paring	Pining		Pepang	Paring
Reming	Rubing	Ruping	Rosing	Reming	Rubing	Oning			Rosing	Reming	Rubing		Rening	Reming
Seniang	Saling	Susang	Sendang	Seniang	Saling	Puring			Sendang	Seniang			Sendang	Seniang
Toyang	Tasing	Tering	Trining		Tasing				Trining	Toyang			Trining	Toyang
Unsang	Unsing	Uding	Uring		Unsing					Ulpiang				Ulpiang
Welpring	Walding		Warling											Welpring
Yoning	Yeyeng		Yayang											
Apiang														

=== Names used between 2001 and 2013 ===
2001	2002	2003		2004		2005	2006	2007	2008	2009	2010	2011	2012	2013	
Auring	Agaton	Amang	Niña	Ambo	Nina	Auring	Agaton	Amang	Ambo	Auring	Agaton	Amang	Ambo	Auring	Nando
Barok	Basyang	Batibot	Onyok	Butchoy	Ofel	Bising	Basyang	Bebeng	Butchoy	Bising	Basyang	Bebeng	Butchoy	Bising	Odette
Crising	Caloy	Chedeng	Pogi	Cosme	Pablo	Crising	Caloy	Chedeng	Cosme	Crising	Caloy	Chedeng	Carina	Crising	Paolo
Darna	Dagul	Dodong	Quiel	Dindo	Quinta	Dante	Domeng	Dodong	Dindo	Dante	Domeng	Dodong	Dindo	Dante	Quedan
Emong	Espada	Egay	Roskas	Enteng	Rolly	Emong	Ester	Egay	Enteng	Emong	Ester	Egay	Enteng	Emong	Ramil
Feria	Florita	Falcon	Sikat	Frank	Siony	Feria	Florita	Falcon	Frank	Feria	Florita	Falcon	Ferdie	Fabian	Santi
Gorio	Gloria	Gilas	Tisoy	Gener	Tonyo	Gorio	Glenda	Goring	Gener	Gorio	Glenda	Goring	Gener	Gorio	Tino
Huaning	Hambalos	Harurot	Ursula	Helen	Unding	Huaning	Henry	Hanna	Helen	Huaning	Henry	Hanna	Helen	Huaning	Urduja
Isang	Inday	Ineng	Viring	Igme	Violeta	Isang	Inday	Ineng	Igme	Isang	Inday	Ineng	Igme	Isang	Vinta
Jolina	Juan	Juaning	Weng	Julian	Winnie	Jolina	Juan	Juaning	Julian	Jolina	Juan	Juaning	Julian	Jolina	Wilma
Kiko	Kaka	Kabayan	Yoyoy	Karen	Yoyong	Kiko	Katring	Kabayan	Karen	Kiko	Katring	Kabayan	Karen	Kiko	Yolanda
Labuyo	Lagalag	Lakay	Zigzag	Lawin	Zosimo	Labuyo	Luis	Lando	Lawin	Labuyo		Lando	Lawin	Labuyo	Zoraida
Maring	Milenyo	Manang		Marce		Maring	Milenyo	Mina	Marce	Maring		Mina	Marce	Maring	
Nanang	Neneng					Nando	Neneng		Nina	Nando		Nonoy	Nina		
Ondoy						Ondoy	Ompong		Ofel	Ondoy		Onyok	Ofel		
Pabling						Pepeng	Paeng		Pablo	Pepeng		Pedring	Pablo		
Quedan						Quedan	Queenie		Quinta	Quedan		Quiel	Quinta		
							Reming		Rolly	Ramil		Ramon			
							Seniang		Siony	Santi		Sendong			
							Tomas		Tonyo	Tino					
									Ulysses	Urduja					
										Vinta					

=== Names used between 2014 and 2026 ===
2014	2015	2016	2017	2018	2019	2020	2021	2022	2023	2024	2025	2026
Agaton	Amang	Ambo	Auring	Agaton	Amang	Ambo	Auring	Agaton	Amang	Aghon	Auring	Ada
Basyang	Betty	Butchoy	Bising	Basyang	Betty	Butchoy	Bising	Basyang	Betty	Butchoy	Bising	Basyang
Caloy	Chedeng	Carina	Crising	Caloy	Chedeng	Carina	Crising	Caloy	Chedeng	Carina	Crising	Caloy
Domeng	Dodong	Dindo	Dante	Domeng	Dodong	Dindo	Dante	Domeng	Dodong	Dindo	Dante	Domeng
Ester	Egay	Enteng	Emong	Ester	Egay	Enteng	Emong	Ester	Egay	Enteng	Emong	Ester
Florita	Falcon	Ferdie	Fabian	Florita	Falcon	Ferdie	Fabian	Florita	Falcon	Ferdie	Fabian	Francisco
Glenda	Goring	Gener	Gorio	Gardo	Goring	Gener	Gorio	Gardo	Goring	Gener	Gorio	Gardo
Henry	Hanna	Helen	Huaning	Henry	Hanna	Helen	Huaning	Henry	Hanna	Helen	Huaning	Henry
Inday	Ineng	Igme	Isang	Inday	Ineng	Igme	Isang	Inday	Ineng	Igme	Isang	Inday
Jose	Jenny	Julian	Jolina	Josie	Jenny	Julian	Jolina	Josie	Jenny	Julian	Jacinto	Josie
Karding	Kabayan	Karen	Kiko	Karding	Kabayan	Kristine	Kiko	Karding	Kabayan	Kristine	Kiko	Kiyapo
Luis	Lando	Lawin	Lannie	Luis	Liwayway	Leon	Lannie	Luis		Leon	Lannie	Luis
Mario	Marilyn	Marce	Maring	Maymay	Marilyn	Marce	Maring	Maymay		Marce	Mirasol	Maymay
Neneng	Nona	Nina	Nando	Neneng	Nimfa	Nika	Nando	Neneng		Nika	Nando	Neneng
Ompong	Onyok		Odette	Ompong	Onyok	Ofel	Odette	Obet		Ofel	Opong	Obet
Paeng			Paolo	Paeng	Perla	Pepito		Paeng		Pepito	Paolo	Pilandok
Queenie			Quedan	Queenie	Quiel	Quinta		Queenie		Querubin	Quedan	Queenie
Ruby			Ramil	Rosita	Ramon	Rolly		Rosal		Romina	Ramil	Rosal
Seniang			Salome	Samuel	Sarah	Siony					Salome	Samuel
			Tino	Tomas	Tisoy	Tonyo					Tino	
			Urduja	Usman	Ursula	Ulysses					Uwan	
			Vinta			Vicky					Verbena	
											Wilma	

== North Indian Ocean ==
At its 27th annual session in February and March 2000, the WMO/ESCAP Panel on North Indian Tropical Cyclones discussed the contents of a report, it had commissioned on the naming of tropical cyclones over the Bay of Bengal and the Arabian Sea. It agreed in principle with the report's recommendation that there was a need for tropical cyclones to be named in its region, however, the representatives of India expressed concern at naming tropical cyclones, because of the regional, cultural and linguistic diversity of the Member countries in the Panel. As a result, the panel agreed that the subject would be considered further at the next session and asked its eight members to provide its rapporteur with at least 10 names as well as their meanings, in accordance with the various criteria that the rapporteur had proposed before the end of the year. At the following session, the rapporteur reported to the panel that seven of the eight members had submitted a list of names to him and presented these to the panel, which reviewed them and felt that they would not be appealing to either the media or the public. As a result, the panel requested that the members should provide the rapporteur with a fresh set of names by June 2001, which should be appealing to both the public and the media. Over the next few months, there was a poor response to this request from members of the panel and at the 29th session of the panel, the rapporteur noted that it wasn't possible to complete the project, without the full cooperation of members. In response to the rapporteur's comments, the panel decided to urge all of its members to submit their proposed names to the rapporteur and ask for a named person who could be contacted to talk about the proposed naming scheme. Over the next year, seven of the eight members submitted their proposed names to the rapporteur, however, at its 30th session, the panel decided that the naming list could not be implemented during the 2003 Season, as India hadn't submitted its names. As a result, the panel urged India to cooperate and submit a list of names for the panel's consideration, while other members were asked to submit the pronunciation of the names that they had suggested.

At the 31st session of the panel, the rapporteur revealed that the proposed list of names was ready for use by panel members, however, India had still not submitted its list of names despite a promise to cooperate from the Director General of the India Meteorological Department (IMD). As a result, the rapporteur recommended that the panel endorsed the proposed list of names and started to use it on an experimental basis, during the 2004 season after India had submitted its names. The rapporteur also recommended that the IMD's Regional Specialized Meteorological Centre in New Delhi, would be responsible for naming the tropical cyclones, once the system had become a cyclonic storm with 3-minute sustained winds of at least 34 knots (63 km/h; 39 mph). It was also suggested that each name should only be used once and that the list of names should be replaced for the 2010 season and every 10 years afterwards. In response the Indian representatives decided to seek approval from the WMO's permanent representative of India for Indian names to be included in the naming scheme and for it to be implemented during the season on an experimental basis. The work on the proposed naming list was completed in May 2004, after India submitted its names and was available to be used by the IMD from September 2004, before the first system was named Onil on October 1, 2004. At its 33rd session, the panel noted that there had been keen media interest in the naming scheme and decided to ask the IMD to continue naming tropical cyclones, before it reviewed it at its following session. Over the next few years, the IMD continued to name tropical cyclones when they had become a cyclonic storm with 3-minute sustained winds of at least 34 knots (63 km/h; 39 mph), before the panel noted at their 45th session in 2018 that the majority of names had been used and that only six remained. As a result of five countries joining the panel since the original list of names was created, the panel decided that a new list of names would be prepared and presented to the panel. Over the next 18 months, each of the member countries submitted a list of names before the final list of names was approved and publicly released by the Panel on April 28, 2020. The first name to be assigned from this fresh list of names was Nisarga, which was named by the IMD when it became a cyclonic storm on June 2, 2020.

=== Names used between 2004 and 2018 ===
2004	2005	2006	2007	2008	2009	2010	2011	2012	2013	2014	2015	2016	2017	2018
Onil	Hibaru	Mala	Akash	Nargis	Bijli	Laila	Keila	Murjan	Mahasen-Viyaru	Nanauk	Ashobaa	Roanu	Maarutha	Sagar
Agni	Pyarr	Mukda	Gonu	Rashmi	Aila	Bandu	Thane	Nilam	Phailin	Hudhud	Komen	Kyant	Mora	Mekunu
	Baaz	Ogni	Yemyin	Khai-Muk	Phyan	Phet			Helen	Nilofar	Chapala	Nada	Ockhi	Daye
	Fanoos		Sidr	Nisha	Ward	Giri			Lehar		Megh	Vardah		Luban
						Jal			Madi					Titli
														Gaja
														Phethai

=== Names used between 2019 and 2026 ===
2019	2020	2021	2022	2023	2024	2025	2026
Fani	Amphan	Tauktae	Asani	Mocha	Remal	Shakhti	Arnab
Vayu	Nisarga	Yaas	Sitrang	Biparjoy	Asna	Montha	Murasu
Hikaa	Gati	Gulab	Mandous	Tej	Dana	Senyar	Akvan
Kyarr	Nivar	Shaheen		Hamoon	Fengal	Ditwah	
Maha	Burevi	Jawad		Midhili			
Bulbul				Michaung			
Pawan							

== South-West Indian Ocean ==
In January 1960, a formal naming scheme was introduced for the South-West Indian Ocean between Africa and 80°E, by the Mauritius and Madagascan Weather Services with the first cyclone being named Alix. Over the next few years the names were selected in various ways including by the meteorological services of the region for several years at a time, before it was turned over to the WMO's South West Indian Ocean Tropical Cyclone Committee at the start of the 2000–01 season.

=== Names used between January 1960 and July 1974 ===
1959-60	1960-61	1961-62	1962–63	1963–64	1964–65		1965–66	1966–67	1967–68	1968–69	1969–70	1970–71	1971–72	1972–73	1973–74
Alix	Anna	Ada	Amy	Amanda	Arlette	Judy	Anne	Angela	Anita	Annie	Aline	Andree	Odette	Ariane	Alice
Brigitte	Barbara	Beryl	Bertha	Betty	Bessie	Kathleen	Brenda	Bella	Belinda	Berthe	Blanche	Betsy	Agnes	Beatrice	Bernadette
Carol	Clara	Chantal	Cecile	Christine	Connie	Lesley	Claude	Colette	Carmen	Claire	Corrine	Claudine	Belle	Charlotte	Christiane
Diane	Doris	Daisy	Delia	Danielle	Doreen	Maureen	Denise	Daphne	Debby	Dany	Delphine	Dominique	Caroline	Dorothee	Dalida
Elise	Eva	Emily	Emma	Eileen	Edna	Nancy	Evelyn	Elisa	Elspeth	Eve	Eliane	Edith	Dolly	Emmanuelle	Esmeralda
		Flora	Fanny	Frances	Freda	Olive	Francine	Florence	Flossie	Fanny	Francoise	Felicie	Eugenie	Faustine	Fredegonde
		Gina	Grace	Giselle	Ginette	Peggy	Germaine	Gilberte	Georgette	Gilette	Genevieve	Ginette	Fabienne	Gertrude	Ghislaine
		Helen	Hilda	Harriet	Hazel	Rose	Hilary	Huguette	Henriette	Helene	Hermine	Helga	Gigi	Hortense	Honorine
		Isabel	Irene	Ingrid	Iris		Ivy	Irma	Ida		Iseult	Iphigenie	Hermione	Isis	
		Jenny	Julie	Jose			Judith	Jackie	Janine		Jane	Joelle		Jessy	
		Kate		Karen			Kay	Kathy	Karine		Katia	Kalinka		Kitty	
		Lucy					Lily		Lottie		Louise	Lise		Lydie	
		Maud							Monique		Michelle	Muriel		Marcelle	
									Noreen			Nelly			

=== Names used between August 1974 and July 1989 ===
1974–75	1975–76	1976–77	1977–78	1978–79	1979–80	1980–81	1981–82	1982–83	1983–84	1984–85	1985–86	1986–87	1987–88	1988–89
Adele	Audrey	Agathe	Aurore	Angele	Albine	Adelaide	Armelle	Arilisy	Andry	Anety	Alifredy	Alinina	Ariny	Adelinina
Blandine	Barbara	Brigitta	Babette	Benjamine	Berenice	Bettina	Benedicte	Bemany	Bakoly	Bobalahy	Berobia	Bemazava	Benandro	Barisaona
Camille	Clotilde	Clarence	Celimene	Celine	Claudette	Christelle	Clarissee	Clera	Caboto	Celestina	Costa	Clotilda	Calidera	Calasanjy
Deborah	Danae	Domitile	Dulcinee	Dora	Danitza	Diana	Damia	Dadafy	Domoina	Ditra	Delifinina	Daodo	Doaza	Dona
Elsa	Ella	Emilie	Esther	Estelle	Eglantine	Edwige	Electre	Elinah	Edoara	Esitera	Erinesta	Elizabeta	Ezenina	Edme
Fernande	Frederique	Fifi	Fleur	Fatou	Flore	Florine	Frida	Fely	Fanja	Feliksa	Filomena		Filao	Firinga
Gervaise	Gladys	Gilda	Georgia	Gelie	Gudule	Gaelle	Gabrielle		Galy	Gerimena	Gista		Gasitao	Gizela
Heloise	Heliotrope	Hervea	Huberte	Helios	Hyacinthe	Helyette	Heberte		Haja	Helisaonina	Honorinina		Hely	Hanitra
Ines		Io	Irena	Idylle	Ivanne	Iadine	Isabeau		Imboa		Iarima		Iarisena	Iana
Junon			Jacqueline		Jacinthe	Johanne	Justine		Jaminy		Jefotra			Jinabo
			Kiki		Kolia	Klara	Karla		Kamisy		Krisostoma			Krisy
			Lucie		Laure	Lisa					Lila			Lezissy
			Marylou											
			Nadine											

=== Names used between August 1989 and June 2004 ===
1989–90	1990–91	1991–92	1992–93	1993–94	1994–95	1995–96	1996–97	1997–98	1998–99	1999–2000	2000–01	2001–02	2002–03	2003–04
Alibera	Alison	Alexandra	Aviona	Alexina	Albertine	Agnielle	Antoinette	Anacelle	Alda	Astride	Ando	Andre	Atang	Abaimba
Baomavo	Bella	Bryna	Babie	Bettina	Bentha	Bonita	Bellamine	Beltane	Birenda	Babiola	Bindu	Bako	Boura	Beni
Cezera	Cynthia	Celesta	Colina	Cecilia	Christelle	Coryna	Chantelle	Cindy	Chikita	Connie	Charly	Cyprien	Crystal	Cela
Dety	Debra	Davilia	Dessilia	Daisy	Dorina	Doloresse	Daniella	Donaline	Davina	Damienne	Dera	Dina	Delfina	Darius
Edisoana	Elma	Elizabetha	Edwina	Edmea	Eliceca	Edwige	Elvina	Elsie	Evrina	Eline	Evariste	Eddy	Ebula	Elita
Felana	Fatima	Farida	Finella	Farah	Fodah	Flossy	Fabriola	Fiona		Felicia		Francesca	Fari	Frank
Gregoara	Gritelle	Gerda	Gracia	Geralda	Gail	Guylianne	Gretelle	Gemma		Gloria		Guillaume	Gerry	Gafilo
Hanta		Heather	Hutelle	Hollanda	Heida	Hansella	Helinda			Hudah		Hary	Hape	Helma
Ikonjo		Irna	Ionia	Ivy	Ingrid	Itelle	Iletta			Innocente		Ikala	Isha	Itseng
			Jourdanne	Julita	Josta	Jenna	Josie					Jery	Japhet	Juba
			Konita	Kelvina	Kylie		Karlette					Kesiny	Kalunde	
				Litanne	Lidy		Lisette						Luma	
				Mariola	Marlene								Manou	
				Nadia										
				Odille										

=== Names used between July 2004 and June 2016 ===
2004–05	2005–06	2006–07	2007–08	2008–09	2009–10	2010–11	2011–12	2012–13	2013–14	2014–15	2015–16
Arola	Alvin	Anita	Ariel	Asma	Anja	Abele	Alenga	Anais	Amara	Adjali	Annabelle
Bento	Boloetse	Bondo	Bongwe	Bernard	Bongani	Bingiza	Benilde	Boldwin	Bejisa	Bansi	Bohale
Chambo	Carina	Clovis	Celina	Cinda	Cleo	Cherono	Chanda	Claudia	Colin	Chedza	Corentin
Daren	Diwa	Dora	Dama	Dongo	David		Dando	Dumile	Deliwe	Diamondra	Daya
Ernest	Elia	Enok	Elnus	Eric	Edzani		Ethel	Emang	Edilson	Eunice	Emeraude
Felapi		Favio	Fame	Fanele	Fami		Funso	Felleng	Fobane	Fundi	Fantala
Gerard		Gamede	Gula	Gael	Gelane		Giovanna	Gino	Guito	Glenda	
Hennie		Humba	Hondo	Hina	Hubert		Hilwa	Haruna	Hellen	Haliba	
Isang		Indlala	Ivan	Izilda	Imani		Irina	Imelda	Ivanoe	Ikola	
Juliet		Jaya	Jokwe	Jade	Joël		Joni	Jamala		Joalane	
			Kamba				Kuena				
			Lola								

=== Names used between July 2016 and June 2027 ===
2016–17	2017–18	2018–19	2019–20	2020–21	2021–22	2022–23	2023–24	2024–25	2025–26	2026–27
Abela	Ava	Alcide	Ambali	Alicia	Ana	Ashley	Alvaro	Ancha	Awo	Agueda
Bransby	Berguitta	Bouchra	Belna	Bongoyo	Batsirai	Balita	Belal	Bheki	Blossom	
Carlos	Cebile	Cilida	Calvinia	Chalane	Cliff	Cheneso	Candice	Chido	Chenge	
Dineo	Dumazile	Desmond	Diane	Danilo	Dumako	Dingani	Djoungou	Dikeledi	Dudzai	
Enawo	Eliakim	Eketsang	Esami	Eloise	Emnati	Enala	Eleanor	Elvis	Ewetse	
Fernando	Fakir	Funani	Francisco	Faraji	Fezile	Fabien	Filipo	Faida	Fytia	
		Gelena	Gabekile	Guambe	Gombe		Gamane	Garance	Gezani	
		Haleh	Herold	Habana	Halima		Hidaya	Honde	Horacio	
		Idai	Irondro	Iman	Issa		Ialy	Ivone	Indusa	
		Joaninha	Jeruto	Jobo	Jasmine			Jude	Juluka	
		Kenneth			Karim			Kanto		
		Lorna								

== Australian Region ==
Ahead of the 1963-64 season, the Australian Bureau of Meteorology announced that a national scheme to name tropical cyclones had been introduced. Each of the Tropical Cyclone Warning Centers (TCWCs) in Perth, Darwin and Brisbane were allocated a separate list of fourteen female names, that started with every third letter, while the letters Q, X, Y and Z were not used. The names were designed to be used in public bulletins, allocated in alphabetical order by the warning centre concerned and on the first indication that a tropical cyclone had developed within their individual area of responsibility. It was also decided that should a tropical cyclone would retain its original name, should it move into another TCWC's area of responsibility. The first name was assigned to Tropical Cyclone Bessie by TCWC Perth on January 6, 1964, before TCWC Brisbane named Tropical Cyclone Audrey later that month. Over the next two years, these naming lists were used by the individual warning centres, before a fresh list of 90 female names was introduced ahead of the 1965-66. Female names were used exclusively until the current convention of alternating male and female names commenced in 1975. Naming lists were introduced for the Papuan National Weather Service and Indonesian Badan Meteorologi, Klimatologi, dan Geofisika. In 2008, the lists used by the three TCWC centres were combined to form a single list of names. Names that cause significant damage within the Australian region are retired with new names selected at the bi-annual meeting of the World Meteorological Organization's RA V Tropical Cyclone Committee.

=== Names used between July 1963 and June 1973 ===
1963–64	1964–65	1965–66		1966–67	1967–68	1968–69	1969–70		1970–71		1971–72		1972–73
Bessie	Rita	Amanda	Martha	Angela	Betsy	Adele	Blossom	Judy	Andrea	Aggie	Kitty	Angela	Jean
Audrey	Flora	Carol	Nancy	Beryl	Bertha	Amber	Diane	Dawn	Carmen	Dora	Sally	Belinda	Kerry
Dora	Una	Joy	Sandra	Clara	Doreen	Beatie	Ada	Florence	Beverly	Gertie	Althea	Emily	Adeline
Carmen	Annie	Lisa	Shirley	Delliah	Dixie	Bettina	Glynis	Cindy	Eva	Ida	Bronwyn	Carol	Maud
Gertie	Judy	Betty	Alice	Edith	Ella	Cheri	Harriet	Kathy	Janet	Fiona	Carlotta	Faith	Kirsty
Eva	Marie	Connie	Gisele	Dinah	Gina	Bridget	Dolly	Isa	Loris	Yvonne	Wendy	Gail	Leah
Katie	Dolly			Barbara	Bonnie	Gladys	Ingrid	Lulu	Myrtle	Maggie	Daisy	Hannah	Madge
Hazel	Joan			Cynthia		Audrey			Polly	Lena	Tessie	Ida	Bella
Norma	Mavis			Elaine		Leonie			Rita	Mavis	Vicky		Paula
	Ruth			Glenda		Esther			Shiela				Marcelle

=== Names used between July 1973 and June 1983 ===
1973–74		1974–75		1975–76		1976–77		1977–78	1978–79	1979–80		1980–81		1981–82		1982–83
Ines	Vera	Marcia	Shirley	Ray	Wally	Harry	Nancy	Tom	Peter	Viola	Ruth	Alice	Eddie	Bessi	Graham	Jane
Anne	Wanda	Norah	Trixie	Joan	Colin	Ted	Jack	Sam	Greta	Wilf	Enid	Bert	Neil	Amelia	Coral	Des
Beryl	Yvonne	Penny	Wilma	Kim	Alice	Irene	Karen	Trudy	Rosa	Paul	Fred	Carol	Freda	Chris	Harriet	Elinor
Natalie	Helen	Selma	Vida	Sue	Dawn	June	Otto	Vern	Hazel	Amy	Simon	Dan	Max	Bruno	Ian	Ken
Cecily	Zoe	Tracy	Beverley	Vanessa	Watorea	Keith	Leo	Gwen	Ivan	Brian	Doris	Edna	Olga	Daphne	Bernie	Lena
Una	Isobel	Flora	Amelia	Alan	Carol	Lilly	Verna	Winnie	Jane	Clara	Gloria	Felix	Paddy	Errol	Dominic	Monty
Deidre	Jessie	Robyn	Clara	Beth	Linda	Miles		Alby	Stan	Dean		Mabel		Abigail	Claudia	Naomi
Erica	Jenny	Gloria	Denise					Brenda	Kevin							
Fiona	Alice							Hal								
Gwenda																

=== Names used between July 1983 and June 1993 ===
1983–84		1984–85		1985–86		1986–87	1987–88	1988–89	1989–90		1990–91	1991–92	1992–93
Oscar	Harvey	Emma	Jacob	Nicholas	Selwyn	Connie	Agi	Ilona	Pedro	Laurence	Vincent	Mark	Ken
Pearl	Bobby	Frank	Pierre	Ophelia	Tiffany	Irma	Frederic	Delilah	Felicity	Walter	Joy	Harriet	Nina
Quenton	Ingrid	Monica	Rebecca	Pancho	Alfred	Damien	Gwenda	John	Rosita	Alex	Chris	Ian	Lena
Esther	Chloe	Nigel	Kirsty	Hector	Victor	Jason	Charlie	Kirrily	Sam	Ivor	Daphne	Neville	Oliver
Fritz	Ferdinand	Odette	Lindsay	Vernon	Alison	Elise	Herbie	Leon	Tina	Bessi	Kelvin	Jane	Polly
Tim	Jim	Gertie	Sandy	Winifred	Manu	Kay		Marcia	Greg		Elma		Roger
Grace	Daryl	Hubert	Tanya	Rhonda	Billy	Blanche		Ned			Errol		Monty
Vivienne	Kathy	Isobel	Margot					Aivu			Marian		Adel
Willy	Lance							Orson			Fifi		
Annette								Ernie			Lisa		

=== Names used between July 1993 and June 2003 ===
1993–94		1994–95	1995–96		1996–97		1997–98	1998–99		1999–00		2000–01		2001–02	2002–03
Naomi	Theodore	Annette	Daryl	Jacob	Lindsay	Pancho	Sid	Zelia	Rona	Ilsa	Tessi	Sam	Abigail	Alex	Fiona
Oscar	Sharon	Bobby	Emma	Isobel	Melanie	Gillian	Selwyn	Alison	Vance	John	Vaughan	Terri	Walter	Bessi	Graham
Pearl	Tim	Violet	Frank	Dennis	Nicholas	Ita	Katrina	Billy	Elaine	Kirrily	Paul	Winsome	Alistair	Bernie	Harriet
Quenton	Vivenne	Warren	Gertie	Kirsty	Ophelia	Justin	Tiffany	Thelma	Frederic	Leon	Rosita	Vincent	Errol	Chris	Craig
Sadie	Willy	Chloe	Barry	Ethel	Fergus	Rhonda	Les	Cathy	Gwenda	Marcia		Wylva	Upia	Claudia	Erica
		Agnes	Hubert	Olivia	Phil	Harold	Victor	Olinda	Hamish	Steve				Des	Inigo
			Celeste		Rachel		May	Damien		Norman				Dianne	Epi
							Nathan	Pete		Olga				Bonnie	

=== Names used between July 2003 and June 2013 ===
2003–04	2004–05	2005–06	2006–07	2007–08	2008–09	2009–10	2010–11	2011–12	2012–13
Jana	Phoebe	Bertie	Isobel	Lee	Anika	Laurence	Anggrek	Fina	Mitchell
Debbie	Raymond	Clare	Nelson	Guba	Billy	Magda	Tasha	Grant	Narelle
Ken	Sally	Daryl	Odette	Melanie	Charlotte	Neville	Vince	Heidi	Oswald
Linda	Tim	Jim	George	Helen	Dominic	Olga	Zelia	Iggy	Peta
Fritz	Harvey	Kate	Jacob	Nicholas	Ellie	Paul	Anthony	Jasmine	Rusty
Monty	Vivienne	Emma	Kara	Ophelia	Freddy	Robyn	Bianca	Koji	Sandra
Evan	Ingrid	Larry	Pierre	Pancho	Gabrielle	Sean	Yasi	Lua	Tim
Nicky	Willy	Floyd		Rosie	Hamish		Carlos		Victoria
Fay	Adeline	Glenda		Durga	Ilsa		Dianne		Zane
Grace		Hubert			Jasper		Errol		
Oscar		Monica			Kirrily				

=== Names used between July 2013 and June 2023 ===
2013–14	2014–15	2015–16	2016–17	2017–18	2018–19	2019–20	2020–21	2021–22	2022–23
Alessia	Bakung	Stan	Yvette	Cempaka	Owen	Blake	Imogen	Paddy	Darian
Bruce	Kate	Tatiana	Alfred	Dahlia	Kenanga	Claudia	Joshua	Teratai	Ellie
Christine	Lam	Uriah	Blanche	Hilda	Penny	Damien	Kimi	Ruby	Freddy
Dylan	Marcia		Caleb	Irving	Riley	Esther	Lucas	Seth	Gabrielle
Edna	Nathan		Debbie	Joyce	Savannah	Ferdinand	Marian	Tiffany	Herman
Fletcher	Olwyn		Ernie	Kelvin	Trevor	Gretel	Niran	Vernon	Ilsa
Gillian	Quang		Frances	Linda	Veronica	Harold	Seroja	Anika	
Hadi	Raquel		Greg	Marcus	Wallace	Mangga	Odette	Billy	
Ita				Nora	Lili			Charlotte	
Jack				Flamboyan	Ann				

=== Names used between July 2023 and June 2026 ===
2023–24	2024–25	2025–26
Jasper	Robyn	Fina
Anggrek	Sean	Bakung
Kirrily	Taliah	Grant
Lincoln	Vince	Hayley
Megan	Zelia	Iggy
Neville	Alfred	Jenna
Olga	Bianca	Koji
Paul	Courtney	Luana
	Dianne	Mitchell
	Errol	Narelle
		Maila

== South Pacific ==
Tropical Cyclones started to be named within the South Pacific, by the New Caledonia Meteorological Office during the 1958–59 season. The Fiji Office of the New Zealand Meteorological Service subsequently started to also name cyclones during the 1969–70 season with Alice being the first name to be used.

=== Names used between 1958 and 1970 ===
1958–59		1959–60		1960–61	1961–62	1962–63	1963–64	1964–65	1965–66	1966–67	1967–68	1968–69	1969–70	
Aurelia	Gabrielle	Amanda	Erika	Barbarine	Alizor		Bertha	Lucie		Angela	Annie	Becky	Alice	Gillian
Beatrice	Honorine	Brigitte	Flora	Catherine			Edith	Olga		Dinah	Brenda	Colleen	Dolly	Helen
Charlotte	Ida	Corine	Gina	Isis			Henrietta			Agnes	Esther	Hortense	Emma	Isa
Dorothee	Bertha	Delilah								Barbara	Florence	Irene	Fanny	
Eulalie	Connie									Glenda	Gisele			
Florence														

=== Names used between July 1970 and June 1985 ===
1970–71	1971–72	1972–73	1973–74	1974–75	1975–76	1976–77	1977–78	1978–79	1979–80	1980–81	1981–82	1982–83		1983–84	1984–85
Nora	Ursula	Bebe	Lottie	Val	Charlotte	Kim	Steve	Fay	Ofa	Diola	Gyan	Joti	Rewa	Atu	Drena
Odile	Vivienne	Collette	Monica	Alison	David	Laurie	Tessa	Gordon	Peni	Arthur	Hettie	Kina	Saba	Beti	Eric
Priscilla	Wendy	Diana	Nessie	Betty	Elsa	Marion	Anne	Henry	Rae	Betsy	Isaac	Lisa	Sarah	Cyril	Freda
Rosie	Yolande	Elenore	Pam		Frances	Norman	Bob	Judith	Sina	Cliff		Mark	Tomasi		Gavin
Dora	Agatha	Felicity	Rebecca		George	Pat	Charles	Kerry	Tia	Daman		Nano	Veena		Hina
Ida		Glenda	Stella		Hope	Robert	Diana	Leslie	Val	Esau		Nisha-Orama			
Lena		Henrietta	Tina		Jan		Ernie	Meli	Wally	Tahmar		Oscar	William		
Thelma		Juliette						Nina		Fran		Prema			

=== Names used between July 1985 and June 2000 ===
1985–86	1986–87		1987–88	1988–89		1989–90	1990–91	1991–92		1992–93	1993–94	1994–95	1995–96	1996–97		1997–98		1998–99	1999–00
Ima	Osea	Uma	Anne	Eseta	Judy	Nancy	Sina	Tia	Esau	Joni	Rewa	Vania	Yasi	Cyril	Hina	Lusi	Ursula	Cora	Iris
June	Patsy	Veli	Bola	Fili	Hinano (Note: The name Hinano was assigned by the Tahiti Meteorological Service.)	Ofa		Val	Fran	Kina	Sarah	William	Zaka	Drena	Ian	Martin	Veli	Dani	Jo
Keli	Raja	Wini	Cilla	Gina	Kerry	Peni		Wasa-Arthur		Lin	Tomas		Atu	Evan	June	Nute	Wes	Ella	Kim
Lusi	Sally	Yali	Dovi	Harry	Lili	Rae		Betsy	Gene	Mick	Usha		Beti	Freda	Keli	Osea	Yali	Frank	Leo
Martin	Tusi	Zuman		Ivy	Meena			Cliff	Hettie	Nisha				Gavin		Pam	Zuman	Gita	Mona
Namu								Daman	Innis	Oli						Ron	Alan	Hali	Neil
										Prema						Susan	Bart		
																Tui			

=== Names used between July 2000 and June 2014 ===
2000–01	2001–02	2002–03		2003–04	2004–05		2005–06	2006–07	2007–08	2008–09	2009–10		2010–11	2011–12	2012–13	2013–14	2014–15
Oma	Trina	Yolande	Dovi	Heta	Judy	Olaf	Tam	Xavier	Daman	Hettie	Mick	Rene	Vania	Cyril	Evan	Ian	Niko
Paula	Vicky	Zoe	Eseta	Ivy	Kerry	Percy	Urmil	Yani	Elisa	Innis	Nisha	Sarah	Wilma	Daphne	Freda	June	Ola
Rita	Waka	Ami	Fili		Lola	Rae	Vaianu	Zita	Funa	Joni	Oli	Tomas	Yasi		Garry	Kofi	Pam
Sose		Beni	Gina		Meena	Sheila	Wati	Arthur	Gene	Ken	Pat	Ului	Zaka		Haley	Lusi	Reuben
		Cilla			Nancy			Becky		Lin			Atu			Mike	Solo
								Cliff					Bune				

=== Names used between July 2015 and July 2027 ===
2015–16	2016–17	2017–18	2018–19	2019–20	2020–21	2021–22	2022–23	2023–24	2024–25	2025–26	2026–27
Tuni	Bart	Fehi	Liua	Rita	Yasa	Cody	Hale	Lola	Pita	Urmil	Wati
Ula	Cook	Gita	Mona	Sarai	Zazu	Dovi	Irene	Mal	Rae	Vaianu	Xavier
Victor	Donna	Hola	Neil	Tino	Ana	Eva	Judy	Nat	Seru		
Winston	Ella	Iris	Oma	Uesi	Bina	Fili	Kevin	Osai	Tam		
Yalo		Josie	Pola	Vicky		Gina					
Zena		Keni		Wasi							
Amos											

== South Atlantic ==
During March 2004, a tropical cyclone developed within the Southern Atlantic, about 1,010 km (630 mi) to the east-southeast of Florianópolis in southern Brazil. As the system was threatening the Brazilian state of Santa Catarina, a newspaper used the headline "Furacão Catarina," which was presumed to mean "furacão (hurricane) threatening (Santa) Catarina (the state)". However, when the international press started monitoring the system, it was assumed that "Furacão Catarina" meant "Hurricane Catarina" and that it had been formally named in the usual way. On March 12, 2010, Brazilian public and private weather services decided to name a tropical storm "Anita" in order to avoid confusion in future references. A naming list was subsequently set up by the Brazilian Navy Hydrographic Center with various names taken from that list between 2011 and the present day.

Catarina (2004)	Anita (2010)	Arani (2011)	Bapo (2015)	Cari (2015)	Deni (2016)	Eçaí (2016)	Guará (2017)	Iba (2019)	Jaguar (2019)
Kurumí (2020)	Mani (2020)	Oquira (2020)	Potira (2021)	Raoni (2021)	Ubá (2021)	Yakecan (2022)	Akará (2024)	Biguá (2024)	Caiobá (2026)

== See also ==
- List of named storms
- Tropical cyclone naming
- European windstorm names
- Atlantic hurricane season
- List of Pacific hurricane seasons
- South Atlantic tropical cyclone
- Tropical cyclone
