= Tropical Storm Wendy (1999) =

Pacific tropical storm in 1999

Tropical Storm Wendy (Mameng)
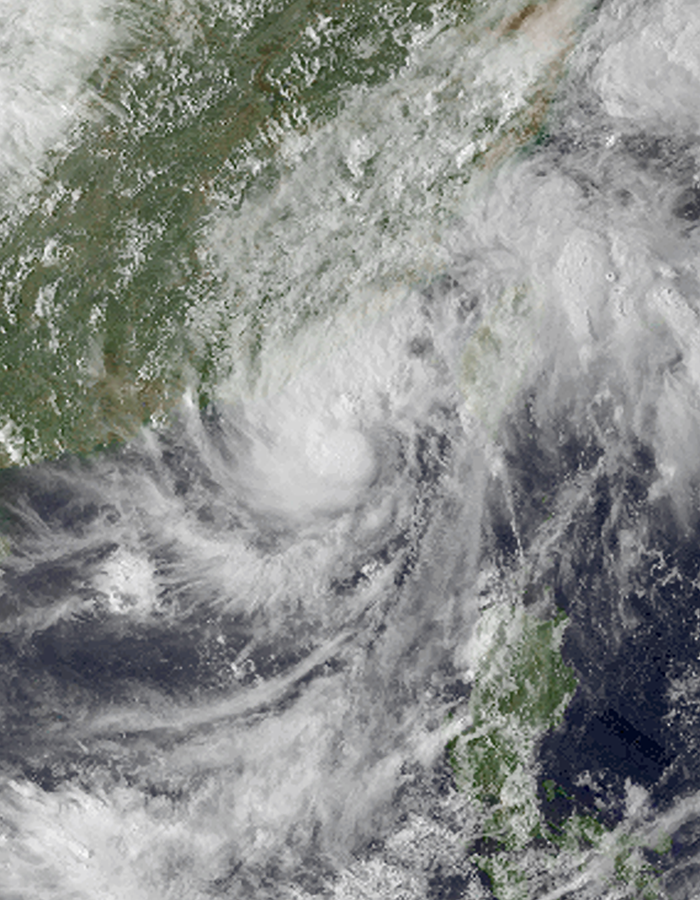
- Tropical Storm Wendy at peak intensity

Meteorological history
- Formed: August 29, 1999
- Dissipated: September 4, 1999

Tropical storm
- 10-minute sustained (JMA)
- Highest winds: 65 km/h (40 mph)
- Lowest pressure: 995 hPa (mbar); 29.38 inHg

Tropical storm
- 1-minute sustained (SSHWS/JTWC)
- Highest winds: 75 km/h (45 mph)

Overall effects
- Fatalities: 133 total
- Damage: $309 million (1999 USD)
- Areas affected: Philippines, China
- IBTrACS
- Part of the 1999 Pacific typhoon season

Tropical Storm Wendy, known in the Philippines as Tropical Storm Mameng, was a deadly tropical cyclone that affected China in early September 1999. Wendy was first monitored on August 29, 1999, and was designated as a tropical depression by PAGASA the next day. Soon afterwards, the JTWC issued a Tropical Cyclone Formation Alert on the strengthening disturbance. On the first day of September, the JTWC designated the disturbance as Tropical Depression 20W. The storm reached its peak intensity late on September 2 and made landfall on China the next night dissipating not long afterward. Wendy caused 133 deaths and 309.3 million dollars (1999 USD) in damage. Despite this, the name Wendy was not retired.

== Meteorological history ==
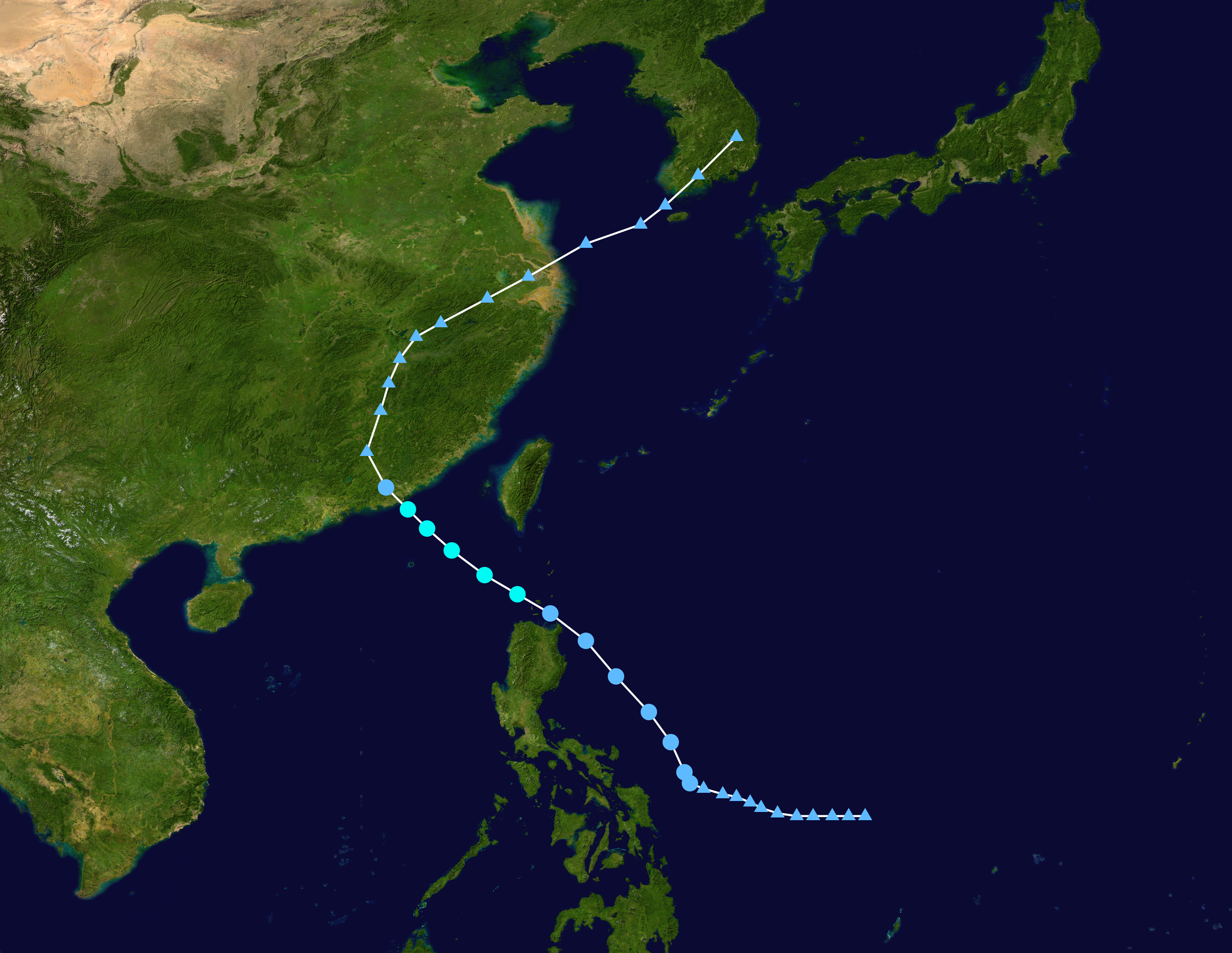
Map plotting the storm's track and intensity, according to the Saffir–Simpson scale Map key Saffir–Simpson scale Tropical depression (≤38 mph, ≤62 km/h) Tropical storm (39–73 mph, 63–118 km/h) Category 1 (74–95 mph, 119–153 km/h) Category 2 (96–110 mph, 154–177 km/h) Category 3 (111–129 mph, 178–208 km/h) Category 4 (130–156 mph, 209–251 km/h) Category 5 (≥157 mph, ≥252 km/h) Unknown Storm type Tropical cyclone Subtropical cyclone Extratropical cyclone, remnant low, tropical disturbance, or monsoon depression

On August 29, 1999, the JTWC began to monitor an area of thunderstorm activity northeast of Yap. By the next day, a broad Lower-Level-Circulation-Center (LLC) had formed with the upper-level environment in the region favorable for additional strengthening. That night, PAGASA began to issue warnings on the disturbance designating it as Tropical Depression Mameng while the system was 400 miles (640 km) northwest of Palau. The system had two primary clusters of strong thunderstorm activity with the highest winds at the edge of the circulation center. The next morning, the JTWC issued a Tropical Cyclone Formation Alert on the developing disturbance because satellite imagery had suggested that a separate LLC was forming in one of the clusters of thunderstorm activity. Early on September 1, the JTWC upgraded the disturbance to a tropical depression designating it "20W".

At the time of the upgrade, the depression had winds of 30 mph (48 km/h) while 175 miles (282 km) east-southeast of Catanduanes Island in the Philippines. Late on September 1, PAGASA upgraded Tropical Depression Mameng (20W) to a tropical storm. Early the next morning, the JTWC relocated the circulation center 200 miles (320 km) to the north as the depression began to approach the island of Luzon. Soon after the storm began to move away from Luzon after its closest approach, the JTWC upgraded Tropical Depression 20W to a tropical storm and assigned it the name Wendy. At 0000 UTC on September 3, the JTWC, PAGASA, and the JMA, the official warning center for the region reported that Wendy (Mameng) had reached its peak intensity with PAGASA issuing its final advisory as it moved out of its area of responsibility. The JTWC reported that peak intensity was 45 mph (72 km/h) (1-min winds), PAGASA reported that peak intensity was 50 mph (80 km/h) (10-min winds), and the JMA reported that peak intensity was 40 mph (65 km.h) (10-min winds). Twelve hours later, the JMA downgraded the tropical storm to a depression. Tropical Storm Wendy continued to move towards the Chinese coast for the next day. As it was nearing land, a Central Dense Overcast, an area of very strong thunderstorms, formed and the tropical storm made landfall about 140 miles (230 km) east-northeast of Hong Kong, and promptly weakened into a tropical depression. The tropical depression dissipated early on September 4 while over the mountains of China.

== Impact and aftermath ==
Tropical Storm Wendy killed at least 133 people in Wenzhou, China, left 59 missing, and injured 2600 more. The storm was labeled "the most serious storm of the century" by the local government. 2.21 million people were effected and 277 million dollars (1999 USD) in direct economic losses due to the storm. The tropical storm flooded over 20,000 hectares of farmland, killed 38,000 livestock and caused 35 million dollars (1999 USD) of direct economic losses in agriculture, forestry, fishing and livestock husbandry. The storm also flooded 54 large companies, causing losses of 4.3 million dollars (1999 USD). Rains from the storm destroyed 2000 houses and damaged 8326 more, and disrupting electric power, communication and traffic in some areas of the region.

== See also ==
- 1999 Pacific typhoon season
- List of historic tropical cyclone names
