= List of named storms =

Storms are named for historical reasons to avoid confusion when communicating with the public, as more than one storm can exist at a time. Names are drawn in order from predetermined lists. For tropical cyclones, names are assigned when a system has one-, three-, or ten-minute winds of more than 65 km/h (40 mph). Standards, however, vary from basin to basin. For example, some tropical depressions are named in the Western Pacific, while within the Australian and Southern Pacific regions, the naming of tropical cyclones are delayed until they have gale-force winds occurring more than halfway around the storm center.

Tropical cyclones are named to avoid confusion with the public and streamline communications, as more than one tropical cyclone can exist at a time. Names are drawn in order from predetermined lists, and are usually assigned to tropical cyclones with one-, three- or ten-minute windspeeds of more than 65 km/h (40 mph). However, standards vary from basin to basin.

== See also ==
- Tropical cyclone
- List of historical tropical cyclone names
- Lists of tropical cyclone names
- List of historical European windstorm names
- Atlantic hurricane season
- Pacific hurricane season
- South Atlantic tropical cyclone
