= Typhoon Tapah (2019) =

Pacific typhoon in 2019

Typhoon Tapah (Nimfa)
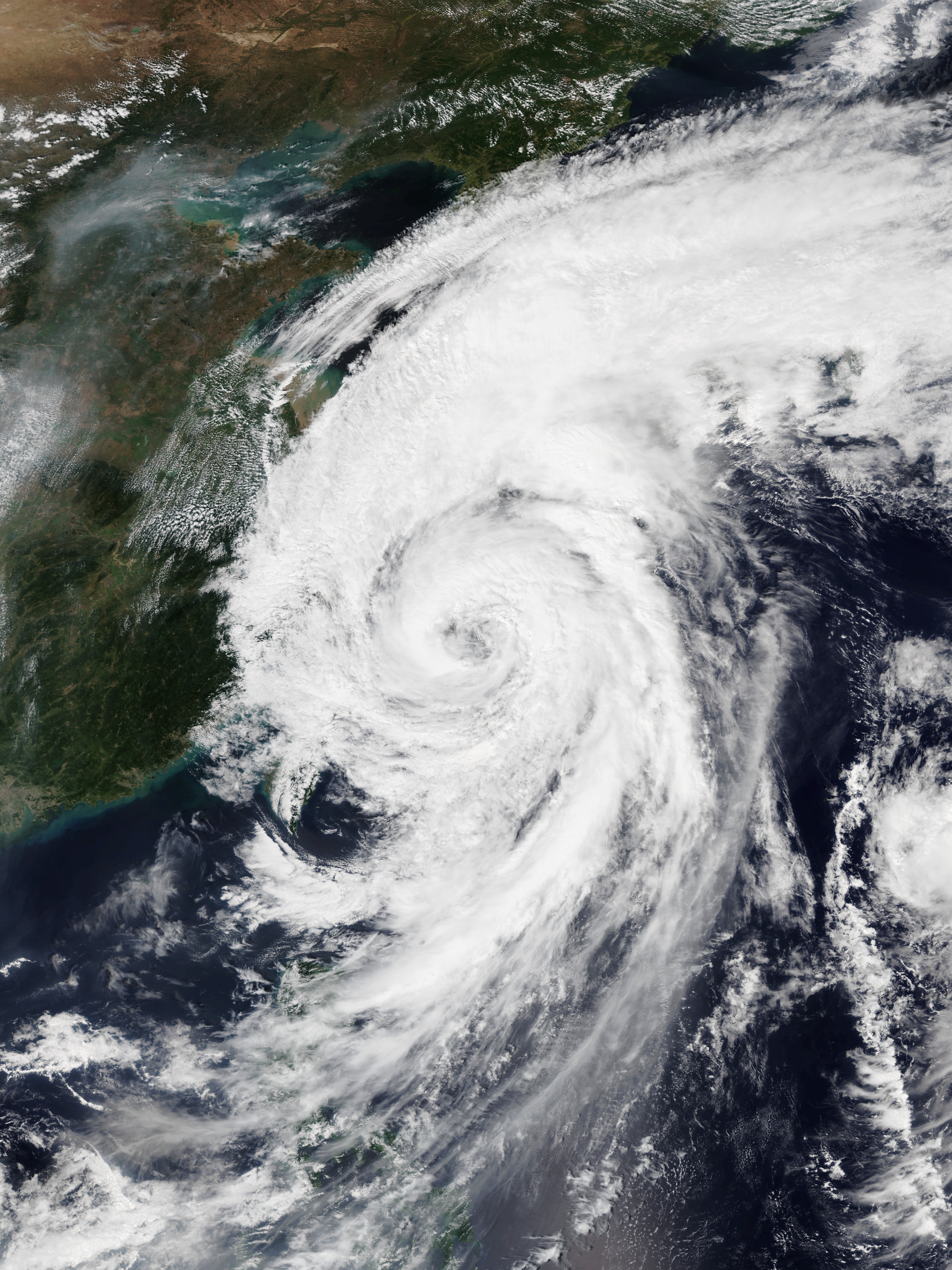
- Tapah over the East China Sea on September 21

Meteorological history
- Formed: September 17, 2019
- Dissipated: September 22, 2019

Typhoon
- 10-minute sustained (JMA)
- Highest winds: 130 km/h (80 mph)
- Lowest pressure: 969 hPa (mbar); 28.61 inHg

Category 1-equivalent typhoon
- 1-minute sustained (SSHWS)
- Highest winds: 140 km/h (85 mph)
- Lowest pressure: 967 hPa (mbar); 28.56 inHg

Overall effects
- Fatalities: 3
- Damage: >$6.9 million (2025 USD)
- Areas affected: Taiwan, East China, Japan, South Korea
- IBTrACS
- Part of the 2019 Pacific typhoon season

Typhoon Tapah, (Note: The name Tapah (Malay: tapah, [tapah]) was contributed by Malaysia and refers to the Wallago catfish (Wallago attu) in Malay.) known in the Philippines as Typhoon Nimfa, was a fairly strong tropical cyclone that peaked as a Category 1-equivalent typhoon, causing damages in Japan and South Korea in mid-September 2019. The seventeenth named storm and the seventh typhoon of the 2019 Pacific typhoon season, Tapah formed on September 17 from the remnants of Tropical Depression Marilyn.

== Meteorological history ==
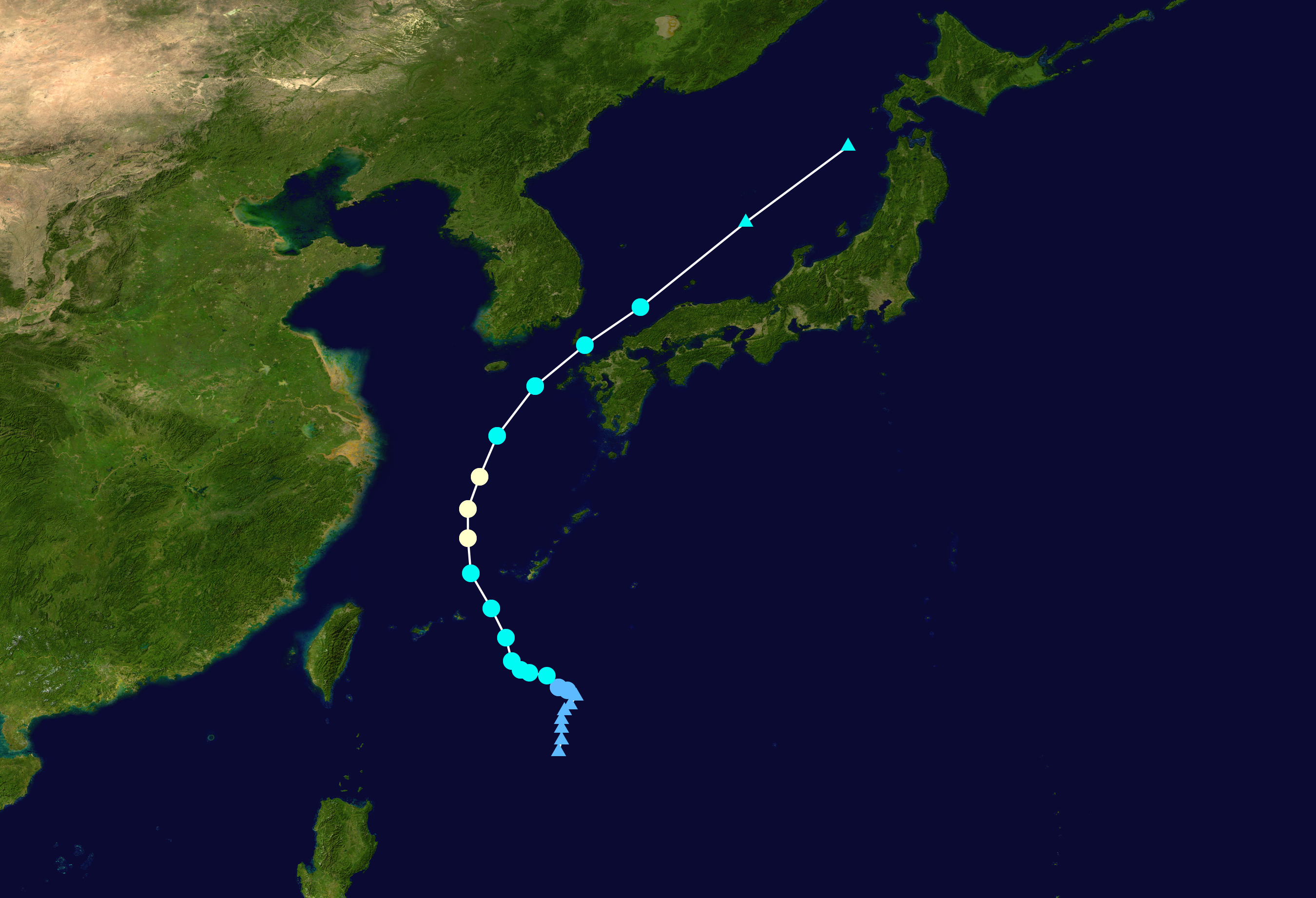
Map plotting the storm's track and intensity, according to the Saffir–Simpson scale Map key Saffir–Simpson scale Tropical depression (≤38 mph, ≤62 km/h) Tropical storm (39–73 mph, 63–118 km/h) Category 1 (74–95 mph, 119–153 km/h) Category 2 (96–110 mph, 154–177 km/h) Category 3 (111–129 mph, 178–208 km/h) Category 4 (130–156 mph, 209–251 km/h) Category 5 (≥157 mph, ≥252 km/h) Unknown Storm type Tropical cyclone Subtropical cyclone Extratropical cyclone, remnant low, tropical disturbance, or monsoon depression

On September 17, a tropical depression formed from the remnants of Tropical Depression Marilyn east of Batanes. The Philippine Atmospheric, Geophysical and Astronomical Services Administration (PAGASA) later named the system Nimfa as it entered the Philippine Area of Responsibility (PAR), with the Joint Typhoon Warning Center (JTWC) issuing a medium warning. The JTWC later issued a Tropical Cyclone Formation Alert (TCFA) for Nimfa, but it was still classified as a monsoon depression, before afterwards designated Nimfa as 18W. The depression was upgraded by the Japan Meteorological Agency (JMA) to a tropical storm, and was named Tapah. A non-warning tropical depression in the South China Sea merged with the circulation of Tapah on September 19. It still had a disorganized and mostly exposed center on that day, though later re-organized itself, and further intensified into a severe tropical storm. Tapah exited the PAR two days later after PAGASA issued its last advisory for it. The storm further intensified as it passed the Ryukyu Islands, upgraded to a typhoon as per the JMA. Later, Tapah weakened into a severe tropical storm, as its wind field diameter expanded. It then began to rapidly weaken, transitioning into an extratropical storm on September 23 at 00:00 UTC. Then, by 18:00 UTC on the same day, the extratropical remnants of Tapah fully dissipated in the Sea of Japan.

== Preparations, impact and aftermath ==
JMA issued a red warning for stormy weather and high waves over the coastal Prefectures of central and northern Honshu. Moderate rainfall to locally heavy rainfall was forecasted for the area. Across the Okinawa and the Miyazaki Prefecture, 21 people were injured and regional authorities had issued evacuation advisories for more than 2,000 people. In addition, media reported that more than 400 flights were canceled and that several railway disruptions and power outages affected around 28,500 buildings. During the passage of Tapah, three people were killed in Japan, and the agricultural damage amounted to ¥583 million (US$5.42 million). Damages in South Korea were at ₩2.96 billion (US$2.48 million). Though three deaths were reported during the storm, officials claimed that they were not related to Tapah.

== See also ==
- Weather of 2019
- Tropical cyclones in 2019
