= Tropical Storm Danas (2019) =

Pacific tropical storm in 2019

Tropical Storm Danas (Falcon)
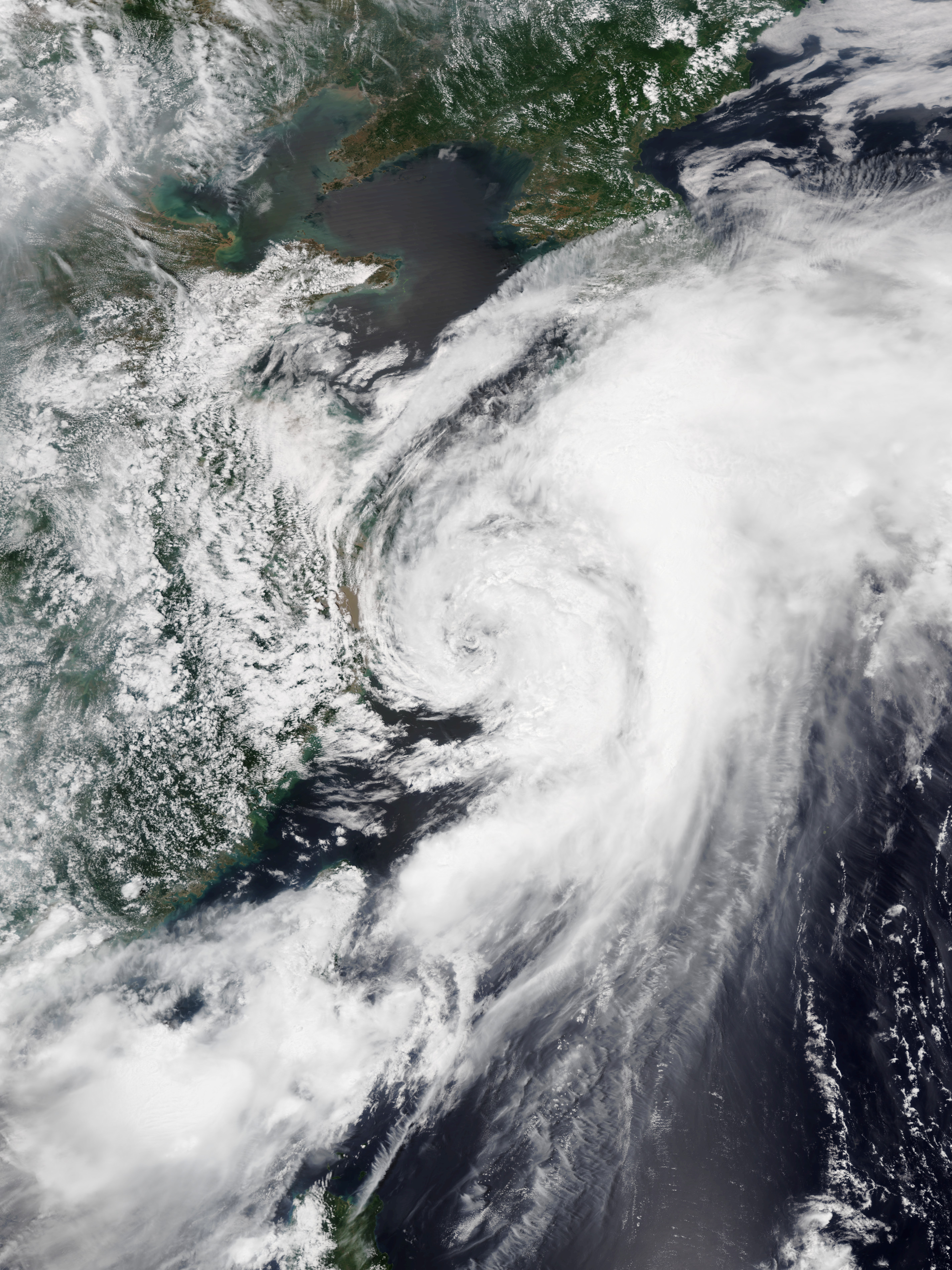
- Tropical Storm Danas (Falcon) near peak intensity on July 19

Meteorological history
- Formed: July 14, 2019
- Dissipated: July 21, 2019

Tropical storm
- 10-minute sustained (JMA)
- Highest winds: 85 km/h (50 mph)
- Lowest pressure: 985 hPa (mbar); 29.09 inHg

Tropical storm
- 1-minute sustained (SSHWS)
- Highest winds: 85 km/h (50 mph)
- Lowest pressure: 984 hPa (mbar); 29.06 inHg

Overall effects
- Fatalities: 6
- Damage: $6.42 million (2019 USD)
- Areas affected: Philippines, Taiwan, China, Japan, South Korea
- IBTrACS
- Part of the 2019 Pacific typhoon season

Tropical Storm Danas, (Note: The name Danas (Tagalog: danas, [ˈdaː.nɐs]) was contributed by the Philippines and means "living, experiencing through an event" in Tagalog.) known in the Philippines as Tropical Storm Falcon, was a tropical cyclone that caused minimal damages throughout its path originating as a low-pressure area near the Mariana Islands. It is the fifth named tropical cyclone and the sixth named storm by the PAGASA of the 2019 Pacific typhoon season.

== Meteorological history ==
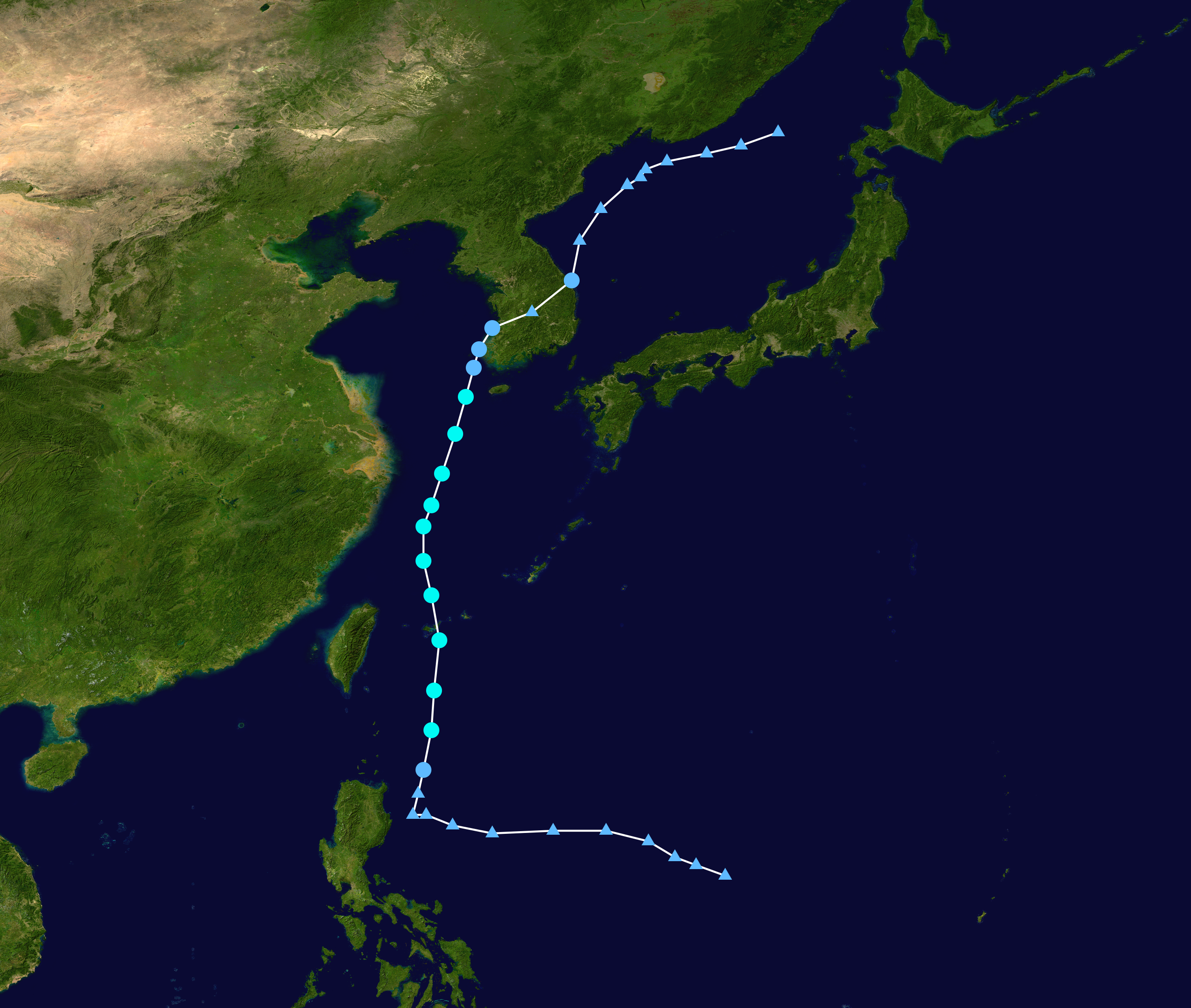
Map plotting the storm's track and intensity, according to the Saffir–Simpson scale Map key Saffir–Simpson scale Tropical depression (≤38 mph, ≤62 km/h) Tropical storm (39–73 mph, 63–118 km/h) Category 1 (74–95 mph, 119–153 km/h) Category 2 (96–110 mph, 154–177 km/h) Category 3 (111–129 mph, 178–208 km/h) Category 4 (130–156 mph, 209–251 km/h) Category 5 (≥157 mph, ≥252 km/h) Unknown Storm type Tropical cyclone Subtropical cyclone Extratropical cyclone, remnant low, tropical disturbance, or monsoon depression

On July 11, a low-pressure zone formed near the Mariana Islands, and the United States Naval Research Laboratory began tracking the system. On the morning of July 14, the Japan Meteorological Agency (JMA) upgraded it to a tropical depression. At this point the system moved westward. At 8 pm, the Joint Typhoon Warning Center gave the system a low chance for tropical cyclogenesis. On the morning of July 15, the JMA issued a gale warning, and the Central Weather Bureau (CWB) of Taiwan upgraded it to a tropical depression. On the same day, the Hong Kong Observatory upgraded the storm to a tropical depression.

At 6:30 am on July 16, the Joint Typhoon Warning Center upgraded the rating to "High" and issued a tropical cyclone warning. The Joint Typhoon Warning Center raised the system to a tropical depression at 2:40 pm, giving the number 06W. At 3 pm on the same day, the Japan Meteorological Agency upgraded it to a tropical storm, naming it Danas, followed by the China Meteorological Center, the CWB, and PAGASA also upgraded it to a tropical storm. The Joint Typhoon Warning Center was upgraded to a tropical storm late that night.

On July 19, the JMA reported that Danas had reached its peak wind speeds with maximum 10-minute sustained winds of 85 km/h (50 mph). Later that day, Danas began to weaken. On July 20, around 13:00 UTC, Danas made landfall in South Korea as a minimal tropical storm, before weakening into a tropical depression soon afterward. The weakening trend also accelerated on July 20 due to the drop in sea surface temperatures to 23 °C (73 °F) near landfall. The Republic of Korea Meteorological Administration downgraded Danas to a tropical depression at 11 am and stopped issuing announcements. At 12:45 UTC on July 21, Danas transitioned into an extratropical low in the Sea of Japan, and the JMA issued their final advisory on the storm.

== Impact ==
=== Philippines ===
In the Philippines, four people were killed after Danas triggered flooding in the country. Agricultural damage in Negros Occidental were calculated at ₱19 million (US$372,000), while agricultural damage in Lanao Norte reached ₱277.8 million (US$5.44 million).

=== South Korea ===
Danas caused stormy weather across South Korea; however, its effects were relatively minor. Heavy rains amounted to 329.5 mm (12.97 in) in Geomun-do. A man died after being swept away by strong waves in Geochang County. Damage in South Jeolla Province were at W395 million (US$336,000), while damage in Jeju Island up to W322 million (US$274,000). Additionally, Danas also triggered flash flooding in Kyushu. An 11-year-old boy was killed.

=== Japan ===
Danas brought heavy rainfall to many western parts of Japan including nearly all of Kyushu. In addition, the amount of rain that fell in the last 24 hours exceeded 350 mm in various places in Goto, and reaches the rainfall for July 1 month in normal years, and it has become the largest since July.

== See also ==
- Weather of 2019
- Tropical cyclones in 2019
