= Typhoon Iris (1959) =

Pacific typhoon in 1959

Meteorological history
- Formed: August 19, 1959
- Dissipated: August 23, 1959

Typhoon
- 10-minute sustained (JMA)
- Lowest pressure: 965 hPa (mbar); 28.50 inHg

Category 2-equivalent typhoon
- 1-minute sustained (SSHWS/JTWC)
- Highest winds: 165 km/h (105 mph)
- Lowest pressure: 966 hPa (mbar); 28.53 inHg

Overall effects
- Fatalities: 820–2,334 total
- Areas affected: Philippines, China, Taiwan
- Part of the 1959 Pacific typhoon season

Typhoon Iris was a catastrophic tropical cyclone that killed as many as 2,334 people in China. Originating from a tropical disturbance over the Philippine Sea on August 19, Iris tracked west-northwestward towards Luzon. Quickly developing into a typhoon by August 21, a northwestward turn kept the center of Iris offshore Luzon. On August 22, the storm attained its peak intensity as a Category 2-equivalent typhoon on the Saffir–Simpson hurricane scale with winds of 165 km/h (105 mph) and a barometric pressure of 966 mbar (hPa; 28.53 inHg). Subsequently, Iris weakened to a tropical storm before making landfall near Kao-Chi, China. Once onshore, the storm rapidly transitioned into an extratropical cyclone and dissipated on August 23.

In the Philippines, rough seas associated with the typhoon caused multiple shipwrecks that killed at least 100 people. Across southeastern China, at least 720 people are known to have been killed by the storm; however, estimates range as high as 2,334.

== Meteorological history ==
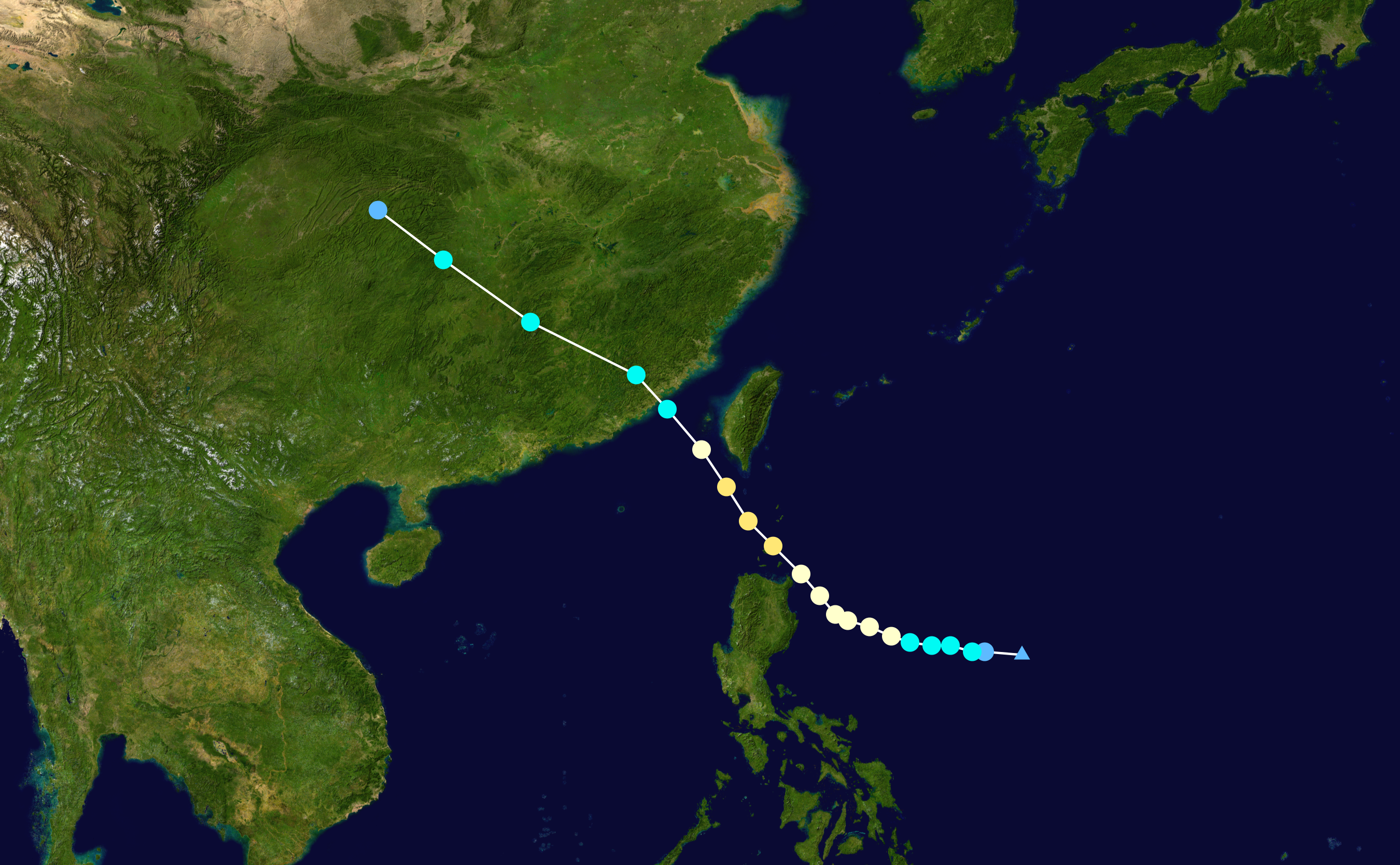
Map plotting the storm's track and intensity, according to the Saffir–Simpson scale Map key Saffir–Simpson scale Tropical depression (≤38 mph, ≤62 km/h) Tropical storm (39–73 mph, 63–118 km/h) Category 1 (74–95 mph, 119–153 km/h) Category 2 (96–110 mph, 154–177 km/h) Category 3 (111–129 mph, 178–208 km/h) Category 4 (130–156 mph, 209–251 km/h) Category 5 (≥157 mph, ≥252 km/h) Unknown Storm type Tropical cyclone Subtropical cyclone Extratropical cyclone, remnant low, tropical disturbance, or monsoon depression

In mid-August, a tropical disturbance developed within the Intertropical Convergence Zone over the Philippine Sea. By August 19, the Japan Meteorological Agency (JMA) began monitoring this system as a tropical depression. (Note: The Japan Meteorological Agency is the official Regional Specialized Meteorological Center for the western Pacific Ocean.) Additionally, the Joint Typhoon Warning Center (JTWC) classified the system as a tropical storm. (Note: The Joint Typhoon Warning Center is a joint United States Navy – United States Air Force task force that issues tropical cyclone warnings for the western Pacific Ocean and other regions.) Initially, a strong ridge over Southeast Asia caused the storm to track slowly west-northwestward; however, the ridge gradually weakened over the following days. The cyclone gradually strengthened to typhoon status on August 21, by which time it had developed a 32 km (20 mi) wide eye. Upon becoming a typhoon, the JTWC named the system Iris. Later that day, Iris turned northwestward as the ridge weakened and brushed the northeastern tip of Luzon.

On August 22, Iris attained its peak intensity as a Category 2-equivalent typhoon on the Saffir–Simpson hurricane scale with winds of 165 km/h (105 mph). Later that day, United States Air Force reconnaissance plane flew into the storm and recorded a barometric pressure of 966 mbar (hPa; 28.53 inHg), the lowest in relation to the storm. After passing roughly 75 km (47 mi) south of Taiwan, known as Formosa at the time, Iris started weakening. Late on August 22, Iris made landfall near Kao-Chi, China as a strong tropical storm. The storm then rapidly transitioned into an extratropical cyclone over China before dissipating late on August 23.

== Impact ==
On August 21, Typhoon Iris brushed the northern coast of Luzon; however, there were no known reports of casualties or damage on land. Offshore, large swells produced by the storm were blamed on at least two shipwrecks. Following the incidents, the United States Seventh Fleet were sent to search for survivors. Near Palawan Island, at least 100 people drowned after a ferry sank; only 11 passengers were rescued. Five more people went missing near Quezon Province after their motorboat capsized.

Heavy rains from the typhoon spread across Taiwan on August 22, triggering significant flash flooding. Along the Haifenglun River, a railroad bridge was washed away. Across the Pescadore Islands, approximately 1,000 people were left homeless.

Across Fujian Province, torrential rains from the typhoon led to catastrophic flooding that killed at least 720 people, injured 618 and left 996 others missing; however, according to the National Oceanic and Atmospheric Administration, the death toll may be as high as 2,334.

== See also ==
- 1959 Pacific typhoon season
