= Typhoon Lorna =

Pacific typhoon in 1954

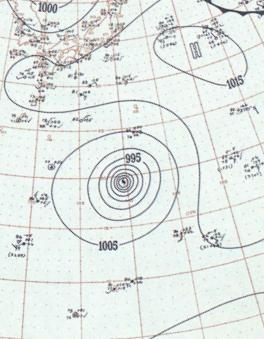
- Surface weather analysis of Typhoon Lorna on September 17

Meteorological history
- Formed: September 10, 1954
- Extratropical: September 18, 1954
- Dissipated: September 22, 1954

Unknown-strength storm
- 10-minute sustained (JMA)
- Lowest pressure: 950 hPa (mbar); 28.05 inHg

Category 3-equivalent typhoon
- 1-minute sustained (SSHWS/JTWC)
- Highest winds: 185 km/h (115 mph)

Overall effects
- Fatalities: 34 total
- Missing: 20
- Damage: >$300 million (1954 USD) (shared with Typhoon June)
- Areas affected: Northern Mariana Islands • Japan
- IBTrACS
- Part of the 1954 Pacific typhoon season

Typhoon Lorna was a strong Category 3 typhoon that severely impacted some areas of Honshu Island, especially Yokohama and Tokyo while also causing damages across the Northern Mariana Islands. The second typhoon to hit Japan after Typhoon June in September, it is the eleventh system to be monitored by the FWC (now-Joint Typhoon Warning Center) during the 1954 Pacific typhoon season. The storm was first tracked by the JMA on September 10, before the FWC followed suit on the next day. After intensifying into a tropical storm by the latter time, it struggled to strengthen further until it intensified into a modern-day Category 1 typhoon on the Saffir–Simpson scale. It then passed just north of the Marianas around September 13, before turning northwestwards on the next day. It then continued to strengthen into a Category 2 typhoon at the morning of September 15 before becoming a Category 3 system on the afternoon of that day. It remained in this strength before it degraded below that status around the next day. On September 17, Lorna was seized by a frontal system, forcing it to move north-northeastwards and make landfall over the Boso Peninsula on the next day. Its eye reportedly passed through Yokohama at that day. It then rapidly degenerated into an extratropical system as it pulled away from Japan, being last monitored by the JMA on September 22.

By September 17, meteorologists of Japan first noticed the threat of Lorna, alerting Tokyo about tropical-storm force winds as Lorna travels towards the country. Many boats and vessels were also warned about the weakening storm, with some of them being asked to leave the harbours. Some of this marine vessels were also advised about the storm via radio equipment. Six houses were pounded by Lorna on Saipan Island, while many establishments there sustained damages. No deaths were registered there. As the typhoon impacted Japan, it caused flooding that left minor damages in Tokyo Bay. Many farmlands were inundated by the typhoon's rainfall, as well as houses. Several highways, railways and public bridges were destroyed while many marine vessels also sank. Two American ships were also caught up with the storm. First estimates of damages were over tens of millions of dollars. Overall, over 422 households and 126 boats sustained damages while over 43,000 were flooded. 34 Japanese were killed by Lorna while 20 were confirmed to have been missing. Along with June, the typhoon incurred over $300 million worth of damages.

== Meteorological history ==
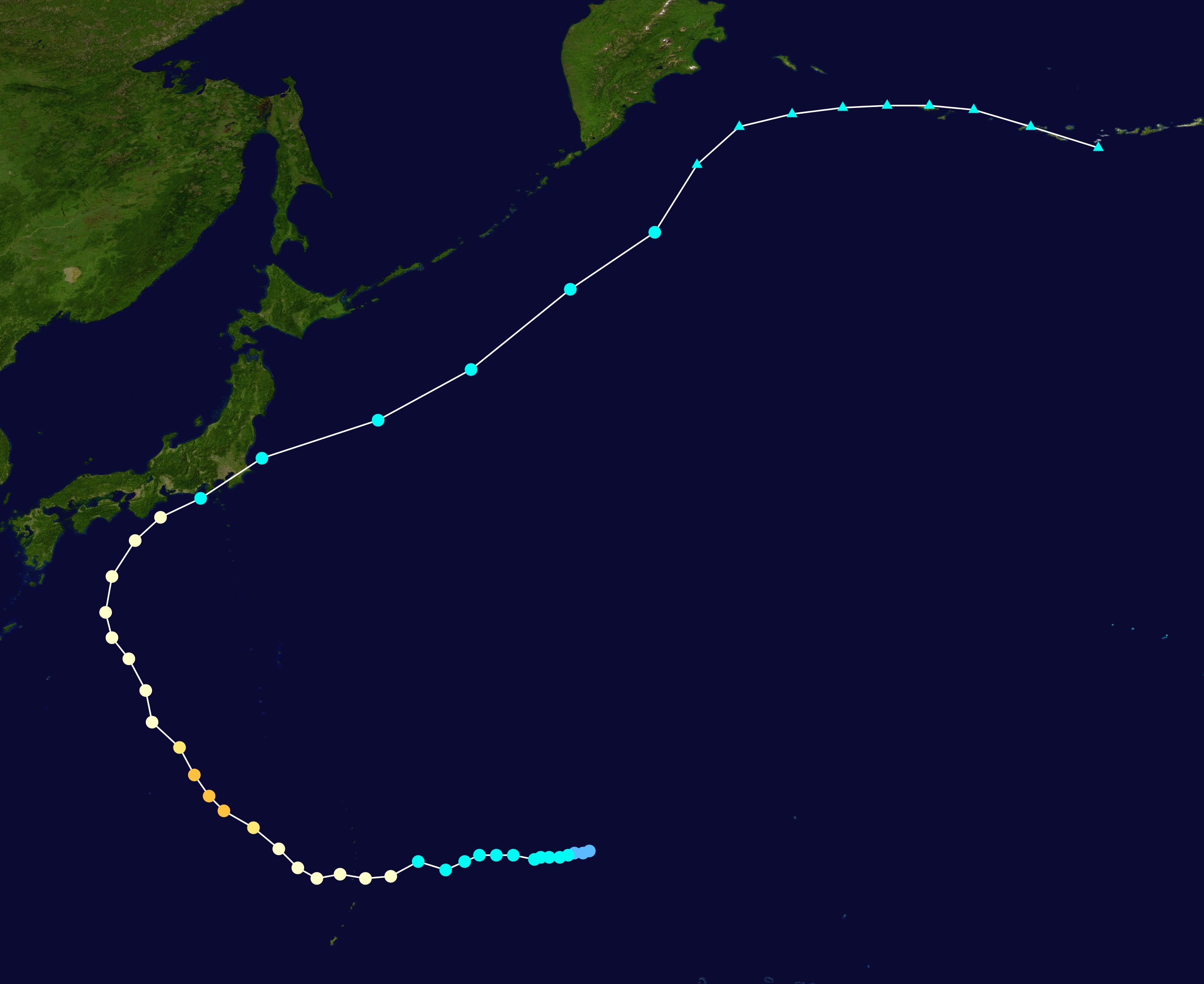
Map plotting the storm's track and intensity, according to the Saffir–Simpson scale Map key Saffir–Simpson scale Tropical depression (≤38 mph, ≤62 km/h) Tropical storm (39–73 mph, 63–118 km/h) Category 1 (74–95 mph, 119–153 km/h) Category 2 (96–110 mph, 154–177 km/h) Category 3 (111–129 mph, 178–208 km/h) Category 4 (130–156 mph, 209–251 km/h) Category 5 (≥157 mph, ≥252 km/h) Unknown Storm type Tropical cyclone Subtropical cyclone Extratropical cyclone, remnant low, tropical disturbance, or monsoon depression

Lorna was first tracked by the Japan Meteorological Agency (JMA) as a 1,006 millibars (29.7 inHg) system at 06:00 UTC of September 10, northeast of Guam. Early the next day, the Fleet Weather Central (FWC) started to monitor the storm's progress, indicating that it intensified into a minimal tropical storm at this time while traveling westwards. Only brief strengthening happened as now-Lorna inclined west-southwestwards and north-northwestwards by September 12 before intensifying into a modern-day Category 1 typhoon by 18:00 UTC of the next day as it dived southwestwards. The typhoon also started to threaten the northern Mariana Islands at this time. However, it took a westward movement, passing just to the territory's north while maintaining its strength of 70 knots (130 km/h; 81 mph). After bypassing the islands, around the afternoon of September 14 it turned north-northwestwards before intensifying further into a Category 2 storm around September 15 at 06:00 UTC and into a Category 3 major typhoon six hours later. Lorna then peaked with winds of 100 knots (190 km/h; 120 mph) and a central estimated pressure of 950 millibars (28 inHg).

Maintaining its intensity as it continued to move just west of the Philippines, it started to weaken at 06:00 UTC of September 16, being downgraded into a Category 2 typhoon; however its central pressure remained at its initial peak estimate. On the same time on the next day, Lorna further weakened into a high-end Category 1 storm as it again inclined near north-northwestwards. Around September 17, Lorna was captured by a frontal system of an extratropical cyclone that was situated over present-day Russia; this caused the system to move north-northeastwards, passing to the south-southeast of the Japanese island of Shikoku before making landfall over the Bōsō Peninsula around September 18. Shortly after Lorna hit land, the weathermen of the United States noted that the typhoon is already becoming an extratropical low as it moved again over the Pacific Ocean. It then moved northeastwards until the FWC stopped tracking the system around 12:00 UTC of September 19; the JMA continued monitoring Lorna until on September 22.

== Effects ==
Six households on Saipan Island were wrecked by the storm there. It also damaged some buildings managed by the United States Base there. However, no deaths were reported there. Starting on September 17, Japanese weathermen forecasted Lorna to slam the island of Honshu, after it briefly threatened Kyushu and Okinawa. These areas were earlier impacted by Typhoon June in the season. Japan's capital Tokyo, were also warned about the storm's possible gale-force winds striking the area. Reports from Kyodo News indicated that all ships and vessels were already warned about the approaching storm by that day, being instructed by port managing individuals there to leave the harbors at Yokohama, while some were informed via radio about Lorna. Individuals over USS General M. M. Patrick and USS Admiral W. S. Benson were also reported to have been "riding out" the storm.

Heavy rains first lashed the southern portions of Japan as Lorna turned northwestwards upon hitting land. By September 17, the area of Tokyo Bay were reported to have been flooded, but it receded by the next day. Only minor damages were caused there. Winds of 58 miles per hour (93 km/h) were registered over Yokohama as the eye of the typhoon passed there over the midnight of September 18. Tokyo also experienced the brunt of the system. The Japanese National Police first recorded a death toll of 13 and 10 missing, along with over 30 suffering different types of injuries. Many houses across the affected portion of the country were also inundated by Lorna's rainfall, along with rice crops and lands. 16 small vessels also sunk on the onslaught of the storm, along with 33 sustaining damages. Many public roadways, bridges and rail tracks were also washed out by the subsequent flooding. However, on the military bases of the United States Forces, no damages were sustained due to Lorna. By the next day, the casualty toll rose to 27 on Honshu, and 8 were reportedly missing. First damage estimates also rain in "tens of millions of dollars" in the country. On September 21, Lorna's death count further rose to 34 and 20 were to be unaccounted for. Almost 300 households and 150,000 hectares (370,000 acres) of cropland were also damaged. This number was finally materialized by the Japan Meteorological Agency in its disaster report about the storm, adding that 422 homes were damages and 43,762 of them were flooded. 126 marine vessels also received damages from Lorna, along with 66,645 hectares (164,680 acres) of farmland. Along with the earlier Typhoon June, Lorna caused over $300 million in damages.

== See also ==
- Typhoon Hagibis
- Typhoon Ida (1958)
