= Typhoon June (1954) =

Pacific typhoon in 1954

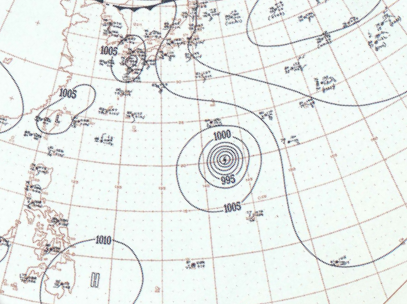
- Surface weather analysis of Typhoon June at peak intensity in the open Pacific Ocean on September 7

Meteorological history
- Formed: September 4, 1954
- Extratropical: September 15, 1954
- Dissipated: September 16, 1954

Unknown-strength storm
- 10-minute sustained (JMA)
- Lowest pressure: 905 hPa (mbar); 26.72 inHg

Category 4-equivalent super typhoon
- 1-minute sustained (SSHWS/JTWC)
- Highest winds: 240 km/h (150 mph)

Overall effects
- Fatalities: 107 reported
- Missing: 39
- Damage: >$300 million (1954 USD) (shared with Typhoon Lorna)
- Areas affected: Japan • Korean Peninsula • Primorsky Krai
- Part of the 1954 Pacific typhoon season

Typhoon June was a large, strong and devastating typhoon that severely impacted the west and central areas of mainland Japan, causing scores of deaths and heavy devastation. A large storm, it was the tenth storm to be tracked by the Fleet Weather Center (FWC) during the 1954 Pacific typhoon season. The storm was already a tropical storm when it was first noticed by both the FWC and JMA by September 4. Only six hours later, the storm intensified into a typhoon and underwent rapid intensification into a modern-day Category 4 super typhoon just east of northern Luzon in the Philippines with maximum sustained winds of 130 knots (240 km/h; 150 mph) calculated in 1-minute sustained winds along with JMA's estimates of its minimum pressure of 910 millibars (27 inHg) on September 7. However, it started to weaken below super typhoon status, and its intensity began to fluctuate while moving northwestwards and north-northwestwards. As it turned northwards by September 12, June regained its intensity as a Category 4 system before making landfall over Yamaguchi Prefecture's Shimonoseki City. There, it weakened and crossed into the Sea of Japan as a tropical storm. Data from the now-Joint Typhoon Warning Center indicated that as the storm made landfall somewhere Primorsky Krai, it retained its tropical storm status. Upon moving inland, it degenerated into an extratropical low before being last monitored by FWC during September 15. However, the JMA did the same on the next day at 06:00 UTC.

Storm warnings were placed for some areas in Japan and the east coast of the Korean Peninsula as June slowly approached these areas. In the former, military bases in Okinawa were sheltered while evacuations of people were initiated over the affected areas, particularly over Miyazaki, Miyakonojo and Nobeoka, where 120,000 estimated people were sheltered into safety. Houses were also shuttered. June's first impacts in the country is at Okinawa, where gale-force winds impacted the island. As the typhoon further approached and made landfall over Japan, public infrastructures including bridges and highways sustained damages. Households were also inundated with floods and some were wrecked. Shipping and communication lines were also affected by the storm. 107 were confirmed to have been killed by the typhoon in the country, while 39 were missing. Over 180,000 were flooded and 39,000 are destroyed completely. Along with Typhoon Lorna that struck Tokyo-Yokohama area, June were responsible for over $300 million (1954 USD) worth of damages. Floods were also experienced across the Korean Peninsula due to the typhoon. The troops of the ROK and US were forced to seek higher ground as their military bases were flooded. Dams were also reported to have been nearing their water levels. The typhoon is also responsible for the highest wind speed being recorded at that time before it was surpassed by 2010's Typhoon Prapiroon. Damages and deaths there, if any are unknown.

== Meteorological history ==
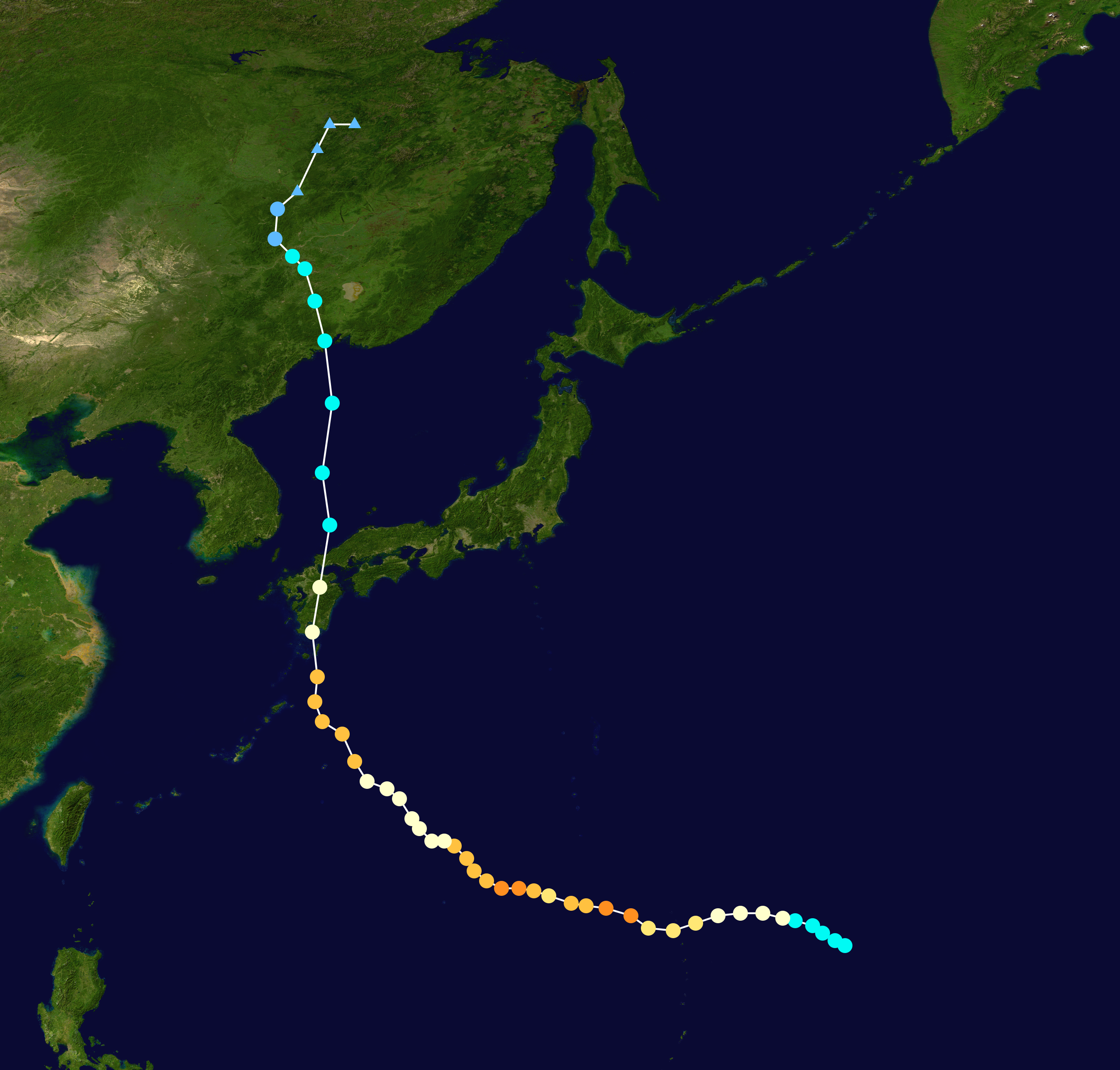
Map plotting the storm's track and intensity, according to the Saffir–Simpson scale Map key Saffir–Simpson scale Tropical depression (≤38 mph, ≤62 km/h) Tropical storm (39–73 mph, 63–118 km/h) Category 1 (74–95 mph, 119–153 km/h) Category 2 (96–110 mph, 154–177 km/h) Category 3 (111–129 mph, 178–208 km/h) Category 4 (130–156 mph, 209–251 km/h) Category 5 (≥157 mph, ≥252 km/h) Unknown Storm type Tropical cyclone Subtropical cyclone Extratropical cyclone, remnant low, tropical disturbance, or monsoon depression

June was first monitored by both the Fleet Weather Center (now Joint Typhoon Warning Center) and the Japan Meteorological Center (JMA), with winds of 50 knots (93 km/h; 58 mph) and a pressure of 1,004 millibars (29.6 inHg) by 06:00 UTC of September 4. At this time, the detected system is moving northwest before steering to the west by the same time on the next day. Six hours later, the FWC upgraded the system into a modern-day Category 1 typhoon while situated to the north-northeast of Guam. As it started to dive southwestwards, it continued to strengthen and from 18:00 UTC that day until 06:00 UTC on September 6, June underwent deepening of its central pressure, bottoming from 996 to 970 millibars (29.4 to 28.6 inHg). The typhoon then strengthened into a Category 2 system, six hours later and kept this designation until it rapidly intensified to a major Category 4 storm by September 7. However, June slightly weakened by the middle of the day, being degraded into a Category 3 cyclone by September 8. Despite the findings of the FWC, the JMA found the typhoon even stronger than earlier, with 910 millibars (27 inHg) being reported at this time. Continued weakening took place before abruptly restrengthening while due northeast of Manila in the Philippines. By the next day, the typhoon further reintensified into a Category 4 typhoon but the JMA analysed the system as a weakened storm with a pressure of 925 millibars (27.3 inHg). On 06:00 UTC, June again weakened below that status while traveling northwestwards to north-northwestwards.

Reconnaissance aircraft examined the system by September 10, and found that June has nearly the same size as Grace in that season, with over 300-mile radius. Its rapid intensification were also unexpected, according to weathermen at the Fleet Weather Central. Starting by 12:00 UTC of September 10, June further degraded into a Category 1 typhoon and this remained until 18:00 UTC of the next day. The typhoon then, for the third and last time intensified again to a Category 4 typhoon by September 12 while still moving northwestwards before turning towards the north, aiming at the main Japanese islands. The storm's size further grew to 600 miles around that day, with meteorologists from Japan comparing the storm to the deadly 1934 Muroto typhoon. It then moved just west of Yakushima Island before making landfall over Shimonoseki City in Yamaguchi Prefecture by the night of September 13. By the next day, it then moved over the Sea of Japan, where, according to FWC it was downgraded into a tropical storm before proceeding northwards and make landfall at 12:00 UTC on the next day somewhere over Primorsky Krai in now-Russia. On September 15, the FWC reported that the system degenerated into a "deep" extratropical low further inland. The agency would stop monitor the storm at 12:00 UTC of September 15; however, the JMA continued to track the typhoon's remnants until the same time of the next day.

== Effects ==
=== Japan ===
Storm warnings were issued for the Okinawan Islands as early as September 10 and over the island of Kyushu due to June as early as September 11. Military installations by the American and Japanese troops were also readied for the approaching storm. Their equipments were also sheltered. The storm also threatened the attacks from the Chinese Civil War, which is occurring at that time. Air Force bases of the Far East troops were also placed on an alert status. The Japanese Red Cross and other soldiers were also alerted of the storm. Weights were also placed on other small or easily damaged establishments due to the storm. Basic needs such as drinking water, food and medical attentions were also addressed. However, American meteorologists forecasted that the Tokyo-Yokohama region will be spared over the full brunt of the storm. The southern portion of the Korean Peninsula were also forecasted by Japanese weathermen to be affected. Rescue workers across Tokyo were also warned of possible impacts from June in the city, with winds up to 50 miles per hour (80 km/h). 350 individuals from Hōfu and Chugoku Bay's small island of Etajima were also sheltered. Thousands across Shikoku and Kyushu were also immediately evacuated due to June. Over Camp Bofu at Kokura, 49 children and women were asked to move out of the area, from the order of a high-ranked military officer. Over 120,000 individuals across Miyazaki, Miyakonojo and Nobeoka were also sheltered to safety.

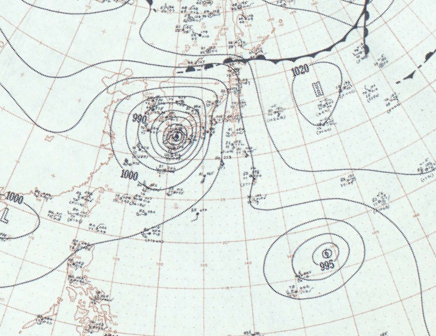
June nearing landfall in Kyushu. Typhoon Lorna is also seen to the typhoon's southeast, developing.

Described as the strongest typhoon to hit Japan since the 1934 Muroto typhoon, Ten-foot rough waves from June caused breaches on a seawall elsewhere on Kyushu, according to the United Press (UP). However weatherman from USA questioned this claim, saying that the typhoon is still far away from Japan. Nevertheless, Okinawa was impacted by 60 miles per hour (97 km/h) wind gusts from June's outer bands. First reports from the storm in Kyushu and Shikoku from the Japanese National Police registered one death and missing each and three injuries somewhere the aforementioned regions. 2,781 houses were inundated with floodwaters while 85 were either wrecked or sustained damages. On the next day, the death toll rose to 22 and the missing at 19. Many rescues were also conducted over the villages and areas that are the most impacted by June. The storm's rainfall also disrupted the ongoing strike by the country's national employees over the military bases in Japan's south. The western half of Japan were skirted by the typhoon's fury as it slowly weakened upon moving inland. Many highways, bridges and communication lines were also damaged. However, no damages were reported on military bases of Americans and Japanese. Shipping operations were disrupted in the country's northern portions. On September 15, the death count rose to 47, with unofficial toll of 92 from Mainichi, a Japanese newspaper. 35 of them were in Minakima, Kyushu alone due to the swelling of Kuma River. The construction ministry of the country also placed the first estimates of the damages in government establishments and equipments from the typhoon to be at $4 million (1954 USD). Cloudy weather with some downpour were also experienced in some areas of Siberia due to the remnants of June, including Vladivostok. Miyakonojō registered a rainfall amount of 679.6 millimetres (26.76 in) from the system, while Uwajima, Ehime got 316.7 millimetres (12.47 in). Overall, 107 were confirmed to have been killed due to June, with 37 missing. 39,855 homes across the country were completely leveled while 181,380 of them were flooded. Over 61,722 hectares (152,520 acres) of farmland were destroyed while 688 marine vessels sustained damages. Along with Typhoon Lorna, June caused over $300 million worth of damages.

=== Korean Peninsula ===
The Korean Peninsula also didn't escape June's impacts, where areas over the region received torrential rainfall from the storm. Before noon by September 14, the Yomsok-chon River over Pyeongtaek overflowed due to the typhoon's rainfall. This incident forced the troops of Republic of Korea and United States' air base to move into a higher place. Roadways leading to the area were flooded, as well as bridges. Two water reservoirs somewhere around the peninsula were also reported to be nearly overflowing due to the downpour. Around Seoul, soldiers there and civilians were also alerted of the Han River increasing its water level for the second time after it did so in the morning of September 15. Over 17 feet (5.2 m) were seen in the reservoir. The now-Seoul Incheon International Airport also prepared its manpower in case of possible evacuations. An eastern small area to the Korean Demilitarized Zone's south received a rainfall amount of 35.5 inches (900 mm) from the reports of the engineers from the Eighth United States Army, which would make the typhoon the fourth-wettest tropical cyclone across the modern-day South Korea. Ulleungdo Island, a small volcanic island registered the highest wind speed to be recorded in the mainland at that time, 45 metres per second (150 ft/s) before it was surpassed in 2010 by Typhoon Prapiroon. On September 16, stranded soldiers at the Camp Taro Leaf somewhere the peninsula were brought food via air, as highways were still not passable.

== See also ==
- 1959 Pacific typhoon season
- Typhoon Grace (1954)
- Typhoon Haishen (2020) – took a similar approach to Japan.
