= Typhoon Grace (1954) =

Pacific typhoon in 1954

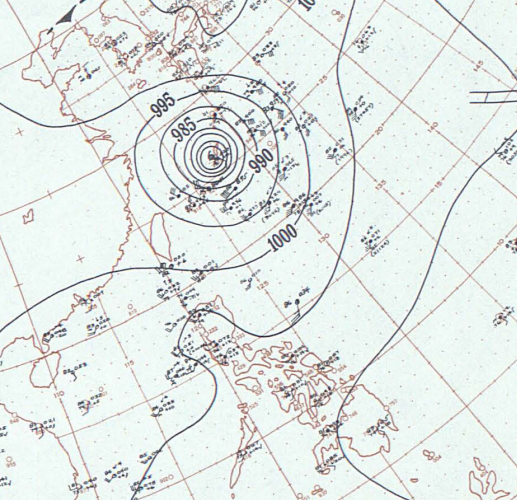
- Surface weather analysis of Typhoon Grace on August 15

Meteorological history
- Formed: August 11, 1954
- Extratropical: August 19, 1954
- Dissipated: August 23, 1954

Unknown-strength storm
- 10-minute sustained (JMA)
- Lowest pressure: 940 hPa (mbar); 27.76 inHg

Category 3-equivalent typhoon
- 1-minute sustained (SSHWS/JTWC)
- Highest winds: 185 km/h (115 mph)

Overall effects
- Fatalities: 43 total
- Missing: 33
- Damage: Unknown
- Areas affected: Formosa • South Korea • Ryukyu Islands • Japan
- Part of the 1954 Pacific typhoon season

Typhoon Grace was a strong typhoon that severely impacted the mainland Japan, whilst the Ryukyu Islands also receiving minor damages. The fourth storm to be monitored by the Fleet Weather Central during the 1954 Pacific typhoon season, Grace was first monitored by the FWC as a tropical storm in the Philippine Sea on the night of August 11. The christened storm then kept its status while tracking northwestwards and due westwards. Two days later, the agency upgraded it into a typhoon before turning towards the Ryukyu Islands by August 14, where its eye passed just near Okinawa Island. Grace peaked as a Category 3 typhoon into the modern-day Saffir–Simpson scale two times; upon entering the East China Sea and just near landfall over the mainland Japan. Upon doing it so, it rapidly weakened and degenerated into a low-pressure system on August 19. However, the JMA tracked the storm's remnants until August 23.

Airplanes from the 307th Bomb Wing were flown into the Philippines to escape any damages from the approaching Grace and Americans on Okinawa were asked to shelter. Only minor damages occurred there, but one person was killed and 10 other suffered injuries. Disruption were also confined to electricity and water supply being lost and huts being wrecked. Ships around Formosa, and troops over the Korean Peninsula were also warned about the storm. Landslides from heavy rains caused over 20 people to be buried alive in Miyazaki Prefecture while many houses across Kagoshima Prefecture were either destroyed or inundated. Over 510 mm of rain were also received over the country's mountain areas. 191 vessels also received damages from the storm, as well as croplands. In total, over 28 were confirmed to be killed due to Grace across Japan, while 33 were to be unaccounted for. 15 more were killed over the Korean Peninsula's south when rough waves overturned a fishing vessel and three only survived.

== Meteorological history ==
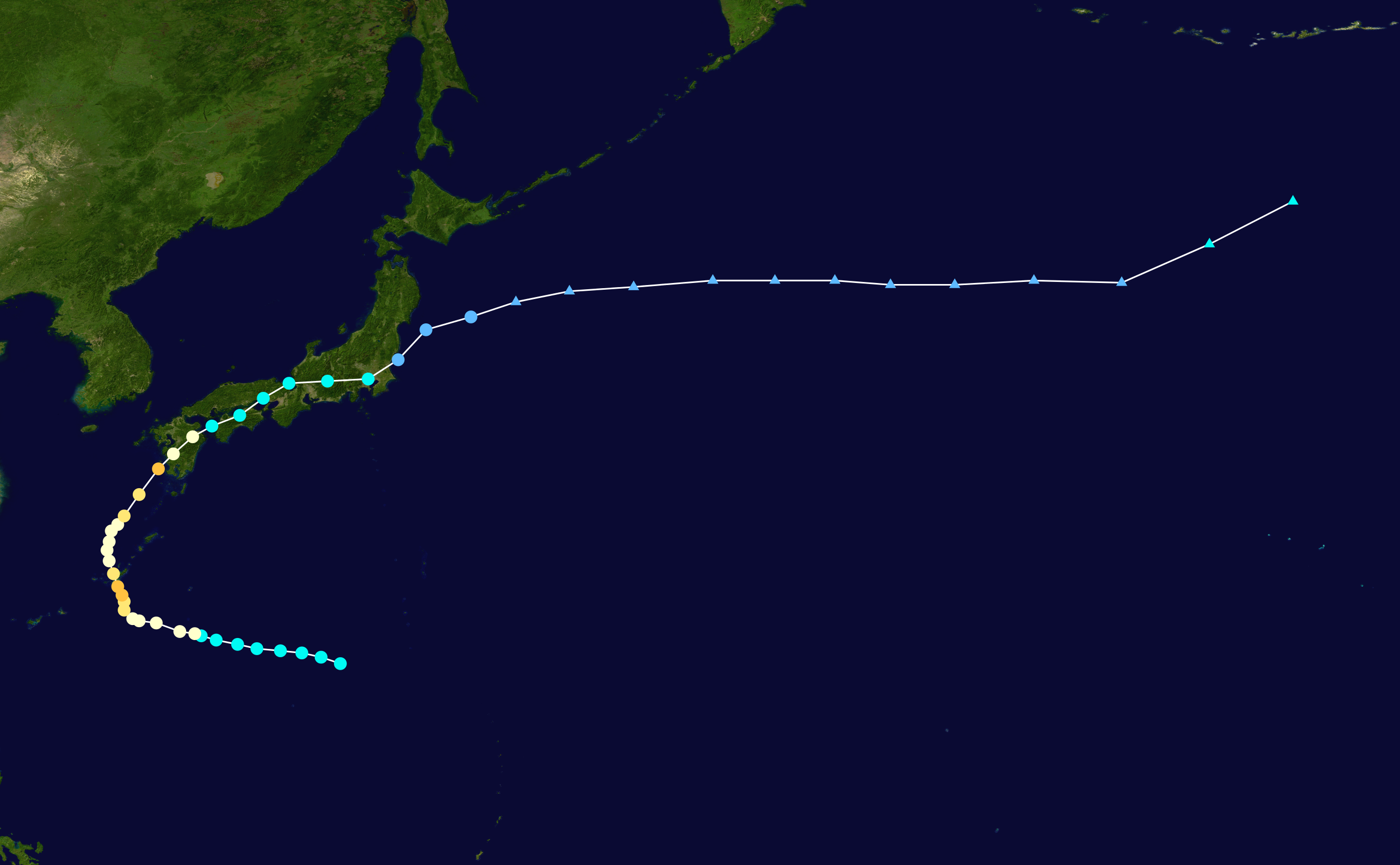
Map plotting the storm's track and intensity, according to the Saffir–Simpson scale Map key Saffir–Simpson scale Tropical depression (≤38 mph, ≤62 km/h) Tropical storm (39–73 mph, 63–118 km/h) Category 1 (74–95 mph, 119–153 km/h) Category 2 (96–110 mph, 154–177 km/h) Category 3 (111–129 mph, 178–208 km/h) Category 4 (130–156 mph, 209–251 km/h) Category 5 (≥157 mph, ≥252 km/h) Unknown Storm type Tropical cyclone Subtropical cyclone Extratropical cyclone, remnant low, tropical disturbance, or monsoon depression

Grace was first tracked by the Fleet Weather Center (now Joint Typhoon Warning Center) at 18:00 UTC as a 40 knots (74 km/h; 46 mph) tropical storm, to the south of Japan on August 11 at 18:00 UTC. Now moving northwestwards, it remained in this intensity until the JMA first monitored the storm six hours later with a pressure of 990 millibars (29 inHg). The storm then slightly inclined westwards before returning to its former movement. Staying in tropical storm intensity, it slowly intensified to modern-day Category 1 typhoon by August 13 at 06:00 UTC. Intensification again halted as Grace continued a westward trajectory before turning towards the north, where it intensified into a Category 2 system by 12:00 UTC of August 14 as it started to impact the Ryukyu Islands. Grace further strengthened into a Category 3 typhoon by the next day before passing into the East China Sea from the Philippine Sea, where it first developed. The JMA also estimated a pressure of 940 millibars (28 inHg) at that time, which continued until two days later. Shortly after passing near the main island of Okinawa, the JTWC reported that the system started to weaken, degrading to 70 knots (130 km/h; 81 mph) by 18:00 UTC.

Grace again then halted its intensification trend as it started to aim at the main Japanese islands while turning northeast. By 18:00 UTC of August 16, it restrengthened slightly and into the next day, the storm attained Category 2 strength for the second time. The typhoon further continued strengthening back into its initial peak by 12:00 UTC before it made landfall somewhere over the Kagoshima Prefecture at that intensity before weakening inland. Still attaining the pressure estimates of JMA upon hitting land, the typhoon is considered one of the strongest to hit mainland Japan in terms of minimum pressure. On August 19 at 06:00 UTC (15:00 JST), the FWC downgraded Grace into a low-pressure area while situated over the central portion of the country. The agency would stop following the system three hours later. However, Grace was still monitored by the JMA as it exited the mainland back into the Pacific Ocean as a weakened system. The agency ceased tracking the remnants of Grace by 06:00 UTC of August 23, to the south of the Aleutian Islands.

== Effects ==
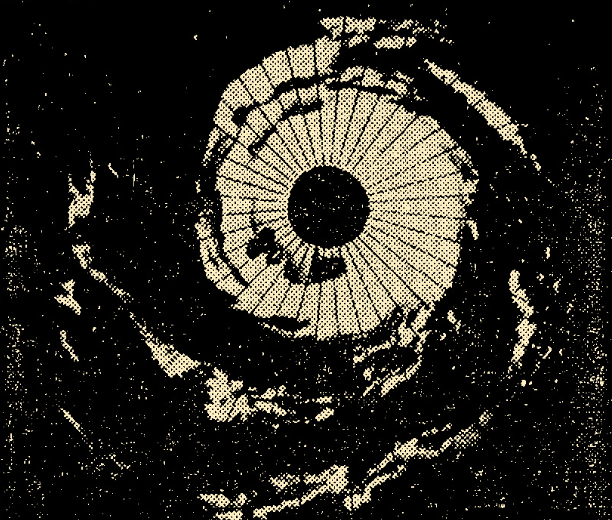
This radar image is captured by 20th Air Force members while Grace is impacting Okinawa Island.

Ships across the waters of Formosa (now Taiwan) were alerted to leave the area where the typhoon would track. Strong winds were also forecasted to batter the country. The weathermen at the Tokyo Weather Central also noted that the typhoon may bring rainfall to the Yangtze Valley, where the place was already flooded. The outer bands of the typhoon were also foreseen to affect the Korean Peninsula, where American troops there were alerted.

As a preparation for Grace, the B-29 Superforts airplanes of the 307th Bomb Wing were sheltered to the Clark Air Field in the Philippines. American individuals residing in Okinawa were also warned to seek shelter. Reconnaissance aircraft from the TWC were also analysing the storm, along with Helen, which is developing to Grace's right. The eye of the storm passed about 60 miles (97 km) to the islands’ south-southeast, where wind gusts of 124 miles per hour (200 km/h) were registered. Its center also possessed winds of 105 miles per hour (169 km/h) upon grazing the region. Although, no major damages or reported deaths were first reported there. Quonset huts were also wrecked by the storm, and power lines were downed, causing electrical outages on areas of Okinawa but not on all parts of the island. Water supply were also disrupted. Further assessments on the island revealed that a Japanese man was killed and 11 Americans suffered injuries due to Grace. Over 16 residential areas in Fort Buckner also suffered damages, and high tide flooded 500 homes in coastal places. An aircraft also received damages.

As the storm roared into the mainland Japanese archipelago, 31 persons were either killed or became missing. The Miyazaki Prefecture alone reported 22 people being buried alive by a landslide. In Kagoshima Prefecture, over 251 homes were completely destroyed while over 4,400 households were inundated by the storm's floods. The National Rural Police in Kyushu also collected reports about nine vessels sinking during the onslaught of the storm by August 18. Rainfall amounts in mountainous areas were estimated to be over 20 inches (510 mm) were recorded. The region also listed 43 individuals to be missing and 17 dead due to the storm, from United Press International (UPI). A vessel named ‘’Ebisu Maru’’ also sent a distress signal over the East China Sea while the typhoon is strengthening there and was presumed to be lost thereafter. USS Rowan, a destroyer were sent into the area to search for the ill-fated ship. The weakening Grace then hit Yokohama, where flooding were seen over the residential areas around Lake Hamana and the city of Tokyo. Rough waves also impacted shores around the former city. Many tourists over Mount Fuji were stranded there and intermittent weather also halted the arrival of SS President Cleveland into Yokohama Harbor. A fishing boat named ‘’No. 2 Sakae Maru’’, a 46-ton vessel also sank during the storm; out of its 45 crew, 32 were successfully rescued and 13 were declared dead as search operations for them were called off by August 23. According to the now-Japan Meteorological Agency (JMA), Grace overall caused 28 casualties in the country, as well as 33 missing. 69 individuals also received injuries. 5,442 homes were wrecked, and 32,265 houses were inundated with floodwaters. 191 marine boats and ships were damaged, as well as 30,476 hectares (75,310 acres) of cropland. 15 more were killed as a fishing boat over the waters of the Man River in present-day South Korea sank and three only managed to swam into safety.

== See also ==
- 1954 Pacific typhoon season
- Typhoon June (1954)
