= 1954 Pacific typhoon season =

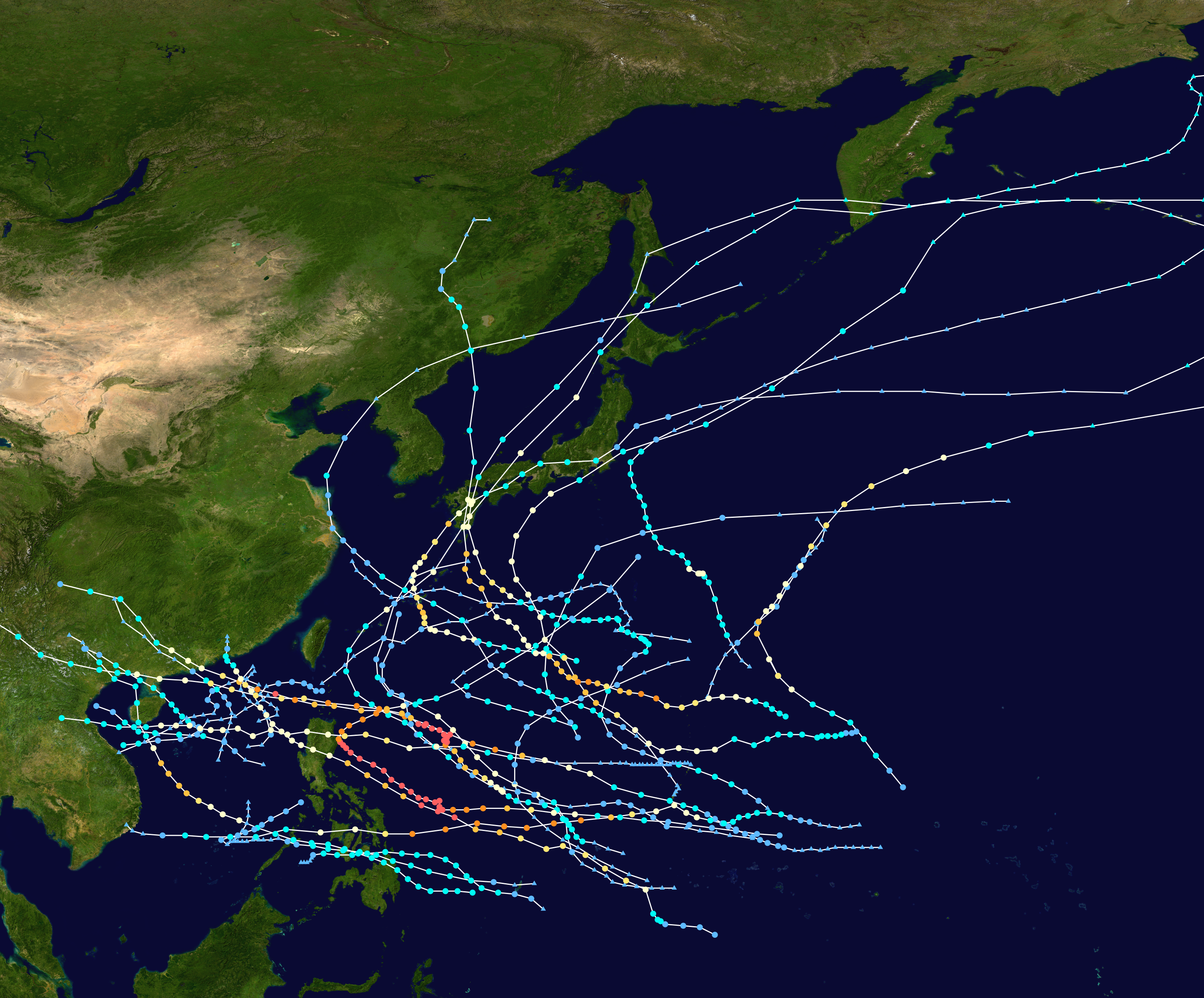
- Season summary map

Seasonal boundaries
- First system formed: March 1, 1954
- Last system dissipated: December 26, 1954

Strongest storm
- Name: Ida
  - Maximum winds: 280 km/h (175 mph) (1-minute sustained)
  - Lowest pressure: 890 hPa (mbar)

Seasonal statistics
- Total depressions: 33
- Total storms: 19
- Typhoons: 15
- Very strong typhoons: 5 (unofficial)
- Total fatalities: 1,530
- Total damage: Unknown

Related articles
- 1954 Atlantic hurricane season; 1954 Pacific hurricane season; 1950s North Indian Ocean cyclone seasons

The 1954 Pacific typhoon season has no official bounds; it ran year-round in 1954, but most tropical cyclones tend to form in the northwestern Pacific Ocean between June and December. These dates conventionally delimit the period of each year when most tropical cyclones form in the northwestern Pacific Ocean.

The scope of this article is limited to the Pacific Ocean, north of the equator and west of the International Date Line. Storms that form east of the date line and north of the equator are called hurricanes; see 1954 Pacific hurricane season. Tropical Storms formed in the entire west Pacific basin were assigned a name by the Fleet Weather Center on Guam.

== Seasonal summary ==
33 tropical depressions formed this year in the Western Pacific, of which 19 became tropical storms. 15 storms reached typhoon intensity, of which 5 reached super typhoon strength.

== Systems ==
=== Tropical Storm 01W ===
- Tropical storm (JMA)
- Tropical storm (SSHWS)
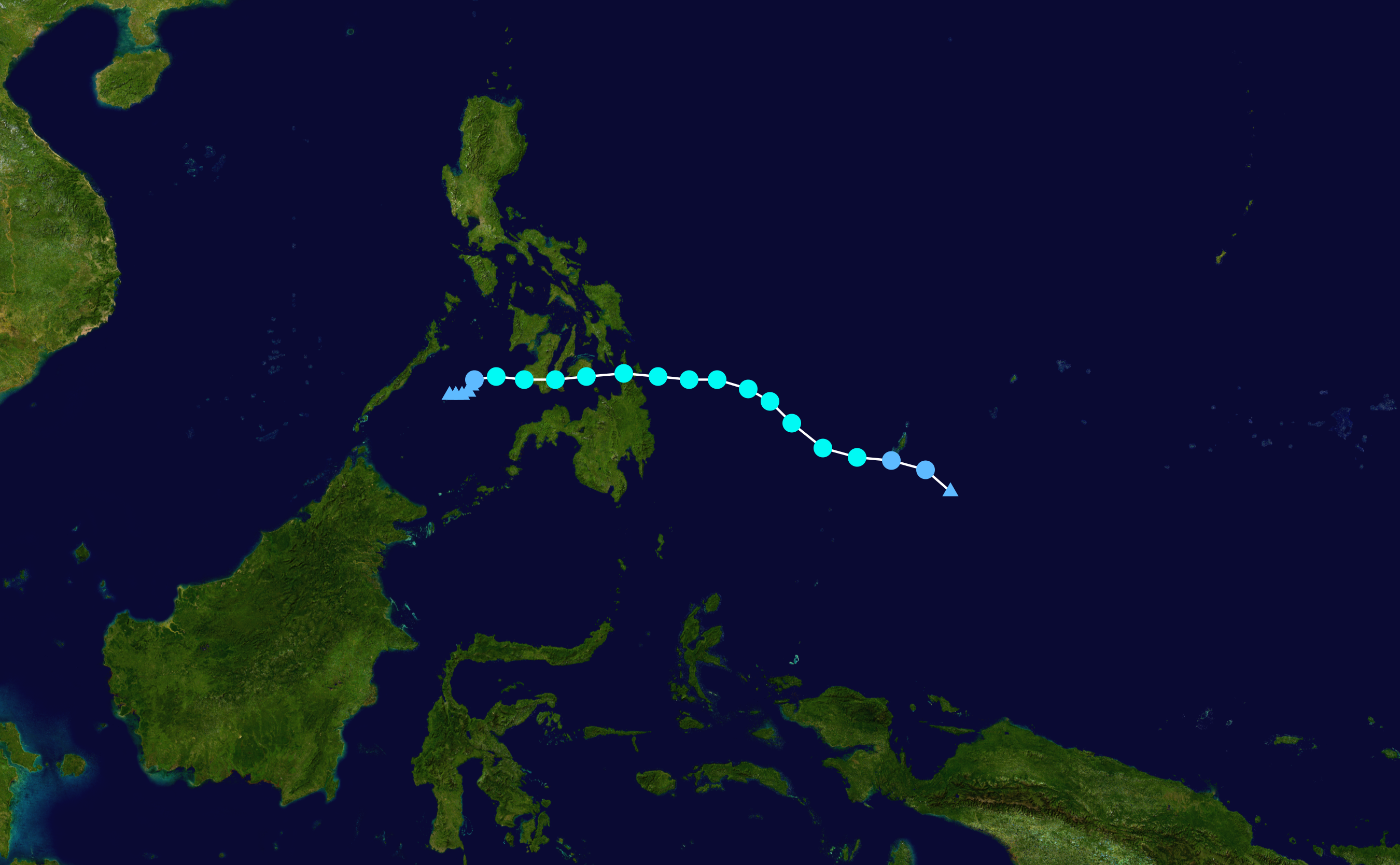
- Duration: March 1 – March 4
- Peak intensity: 95 km/h (60 mph) (1-min); 990 hPa (mbar)

A tropical storm that affected the Philippines.

=== Typhoon Elsie ===
- Typhoon (JMA)
- Category 3 typhoon (SSHWS)
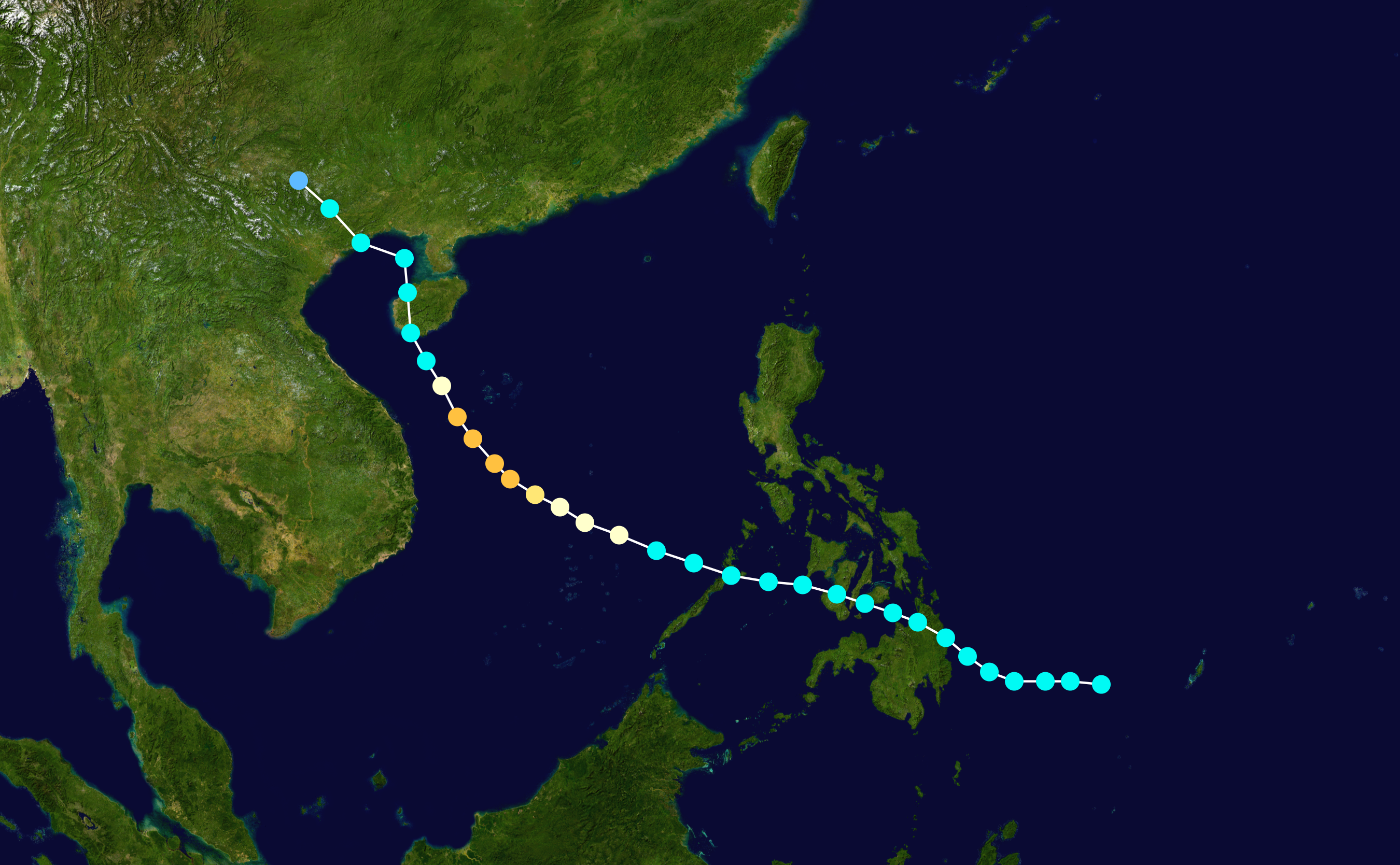
- Duration: May 5 – May 12
- Peak intensity: 185 km/h (115 mph) (1-min); 945 hPa (mbar)

Elsie formed on May 5 east of the Philippines. After moving into the South China Sea, Elsie strengthened into a Category 3 typhoon. It later weakened and hit China as a tropical storm, and dissipated on May 12.

=== Typhoon Flossie ===
- Typhoon (JMA)
- Category 1 typhoon (SSHWS)
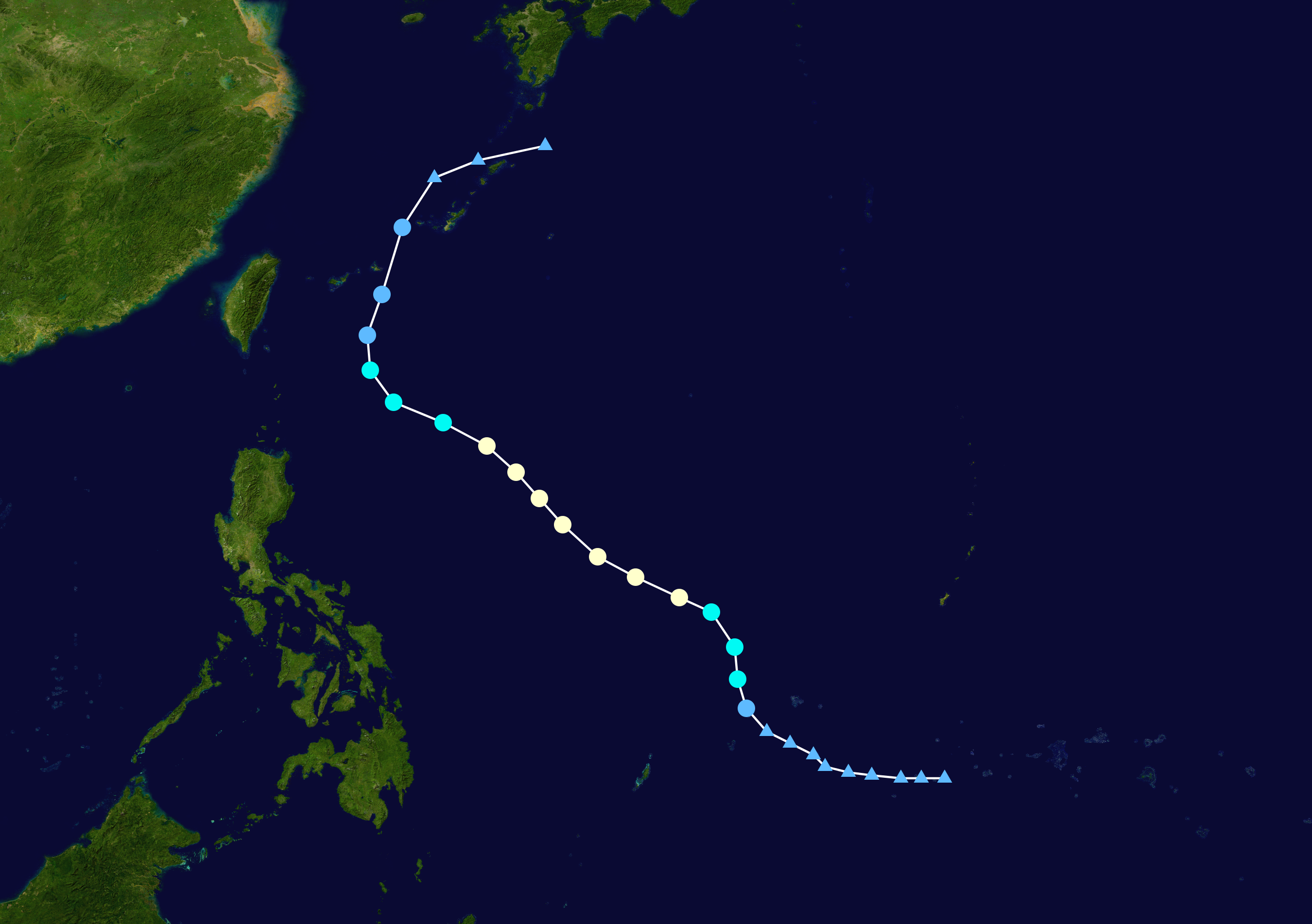
- Duration: July 4 – July 10
- Peak intensity: 140 km/h (85 mph) (1-min); 985 hPa (mbar)

Flossie tracked into open waters.

=== Typhoon Grace ===
- Typhoon (JMA)
- Category 3 typhoon (SSHWS)
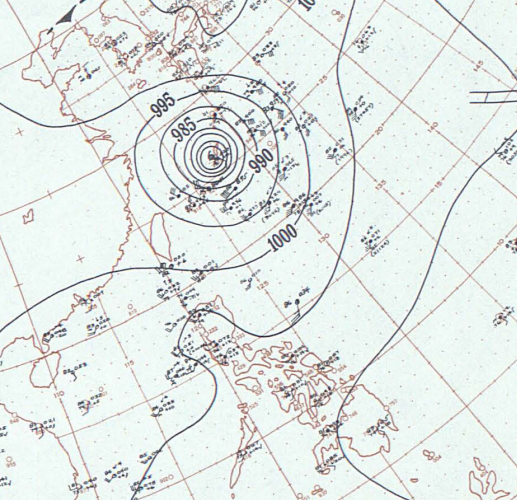
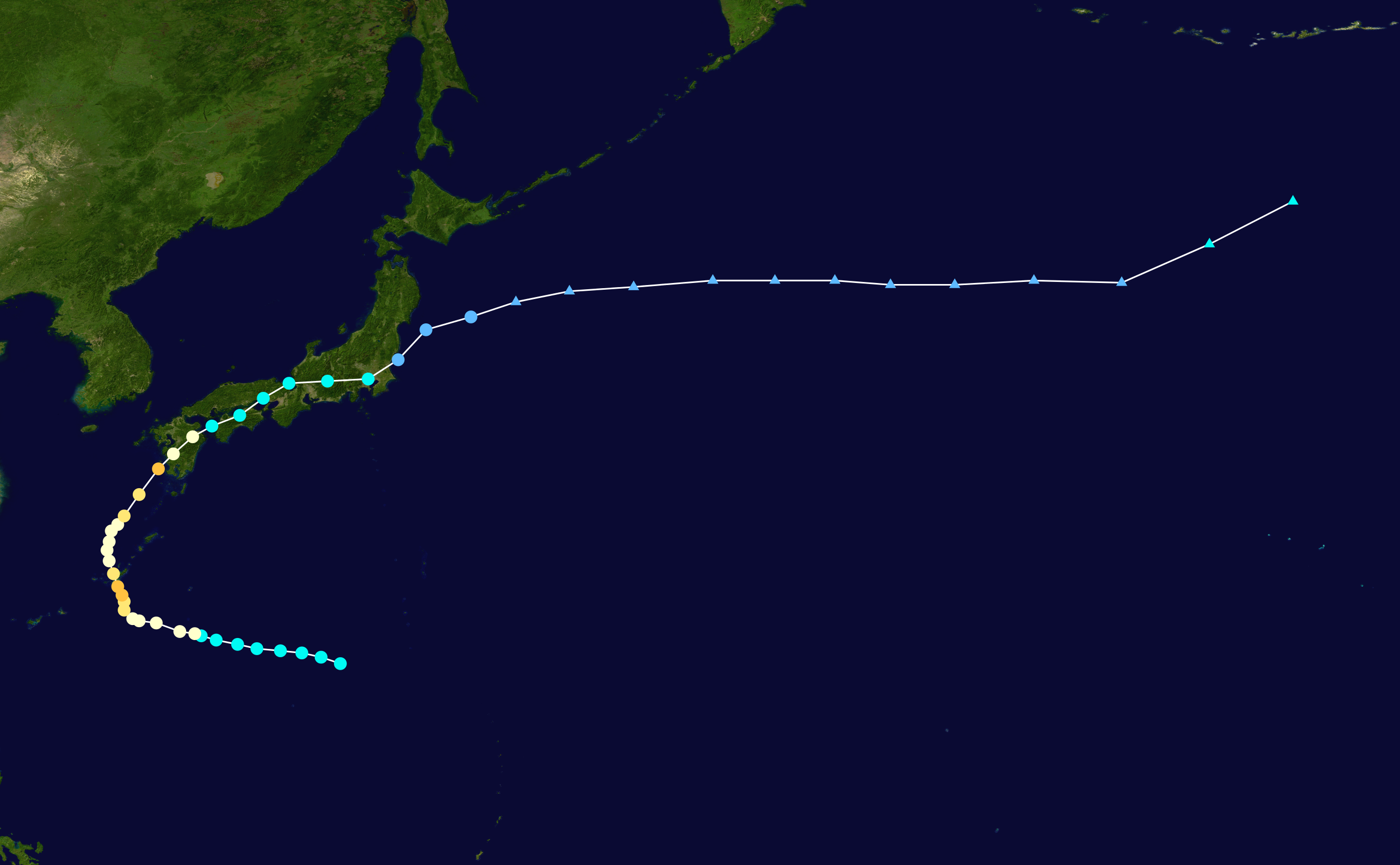
- Duration: August 11 – August 19
- Peak intensity: 185 km/h (115 mph) (1-min); 940 hPa (mbar)

Typhoon Grace struck the Southern Japanese islands of Kyūshū and Shikoku as well as Okinawa. 28 people were killed and 33 were missing.

=== Typhoon Helen ===
- Typhoon (JMA)
- Category 1 typhoon (SSHWS)
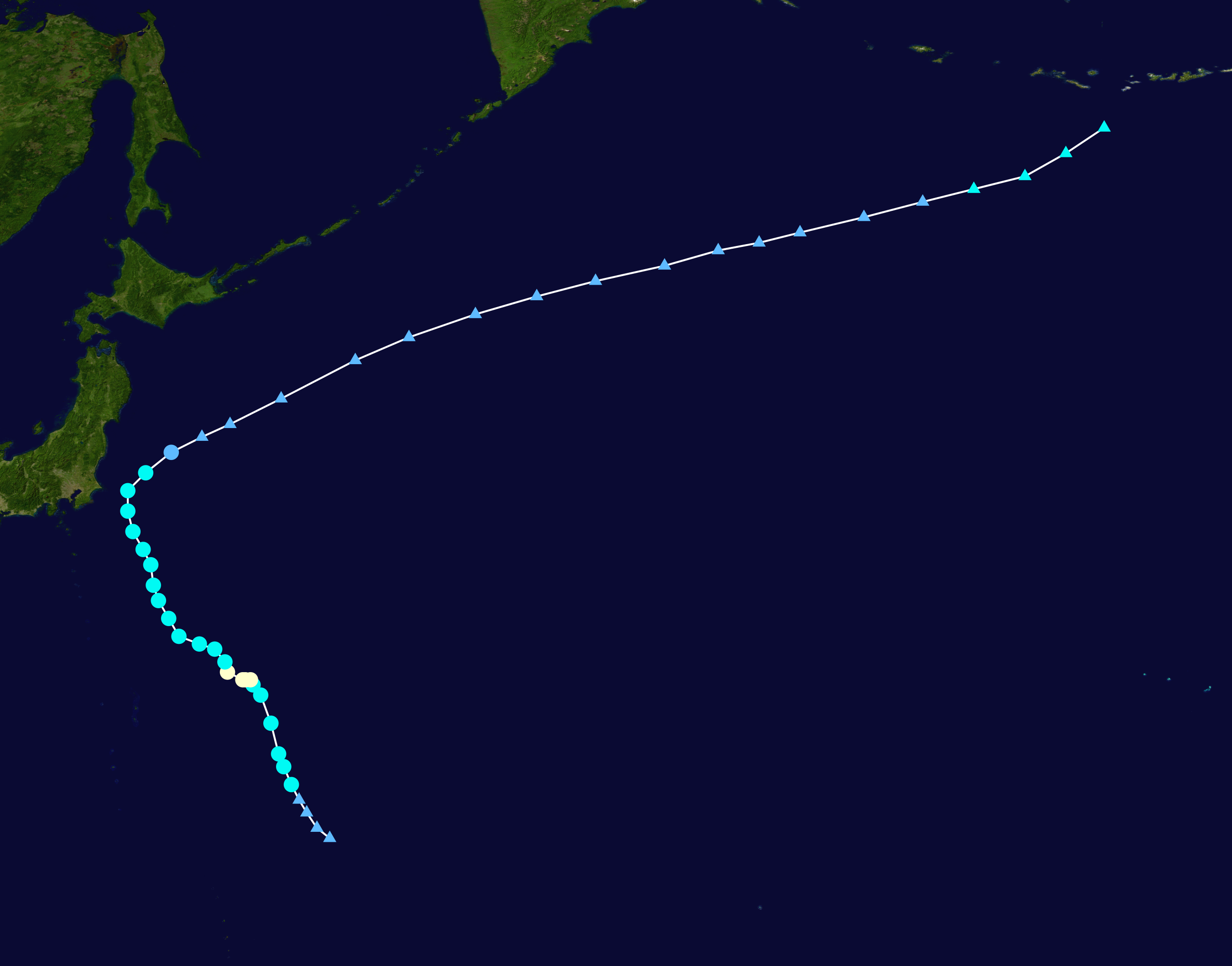
- Duration: August 11 – August 17
- Peak intensity: 130 km/h (80 mph) (1-min); 965 hPa (mbar)

Helen approached Japan as a tropical storm but didn't make landfall.

=== Super Typhoon Ida ===
- Typhoon (JMA)
- Category 5 super typhoon (SSHWS)
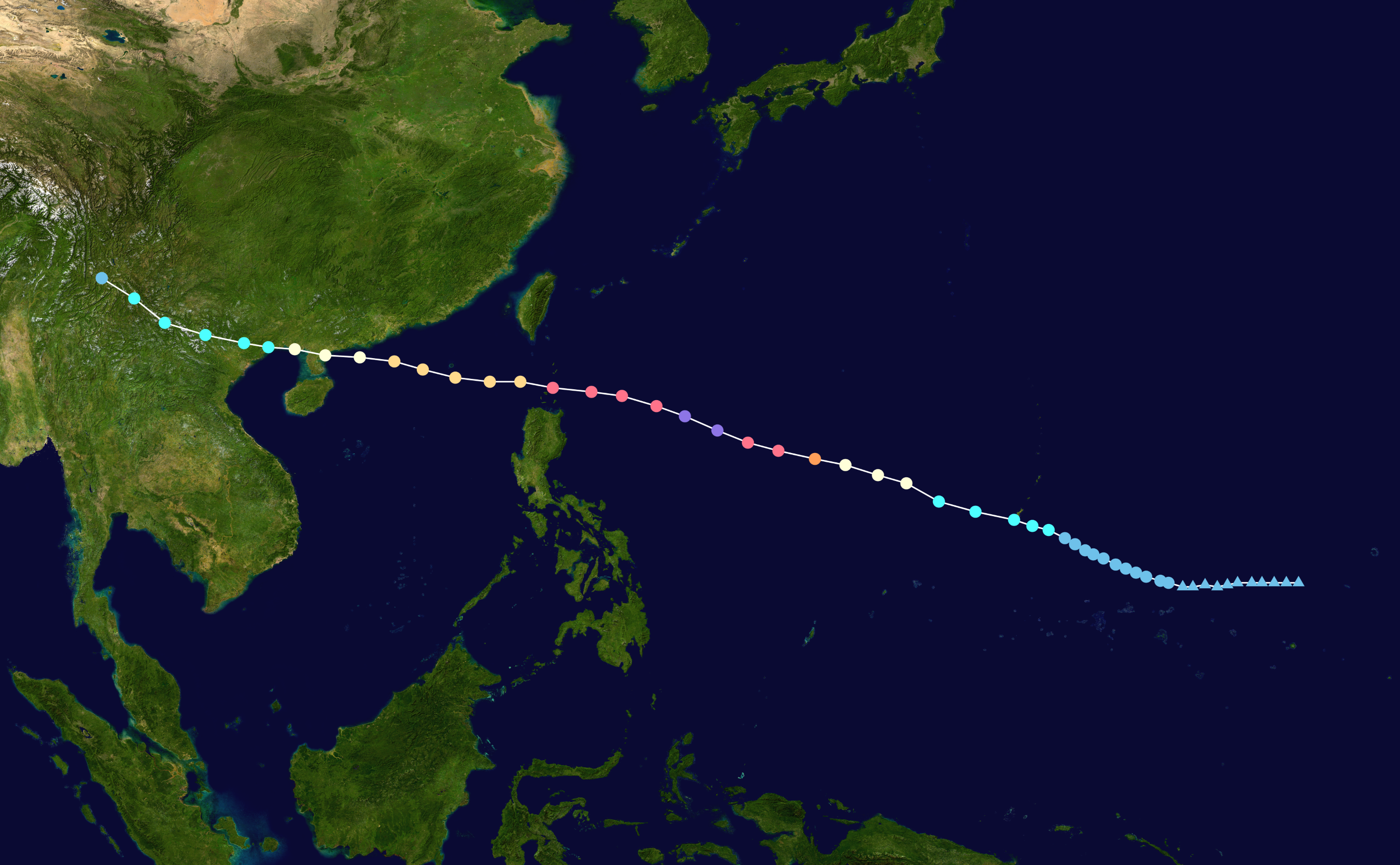
- Duration: August 18 – August 31
- Peak intensity: 280 km/h (175 mph) (1-min); 890 hPa (mbar)

Ida was the strongest storm of 1954, and made landfall in China. At least 884 were killed. Ida caused maximum storm surge of 1.68 metre at North Point/Quarry Bay when passing by Hong Kong.

=== Tropical Storm 07W ===
- Tropical storm (JMA)
- Tropical storm (SSHWS)
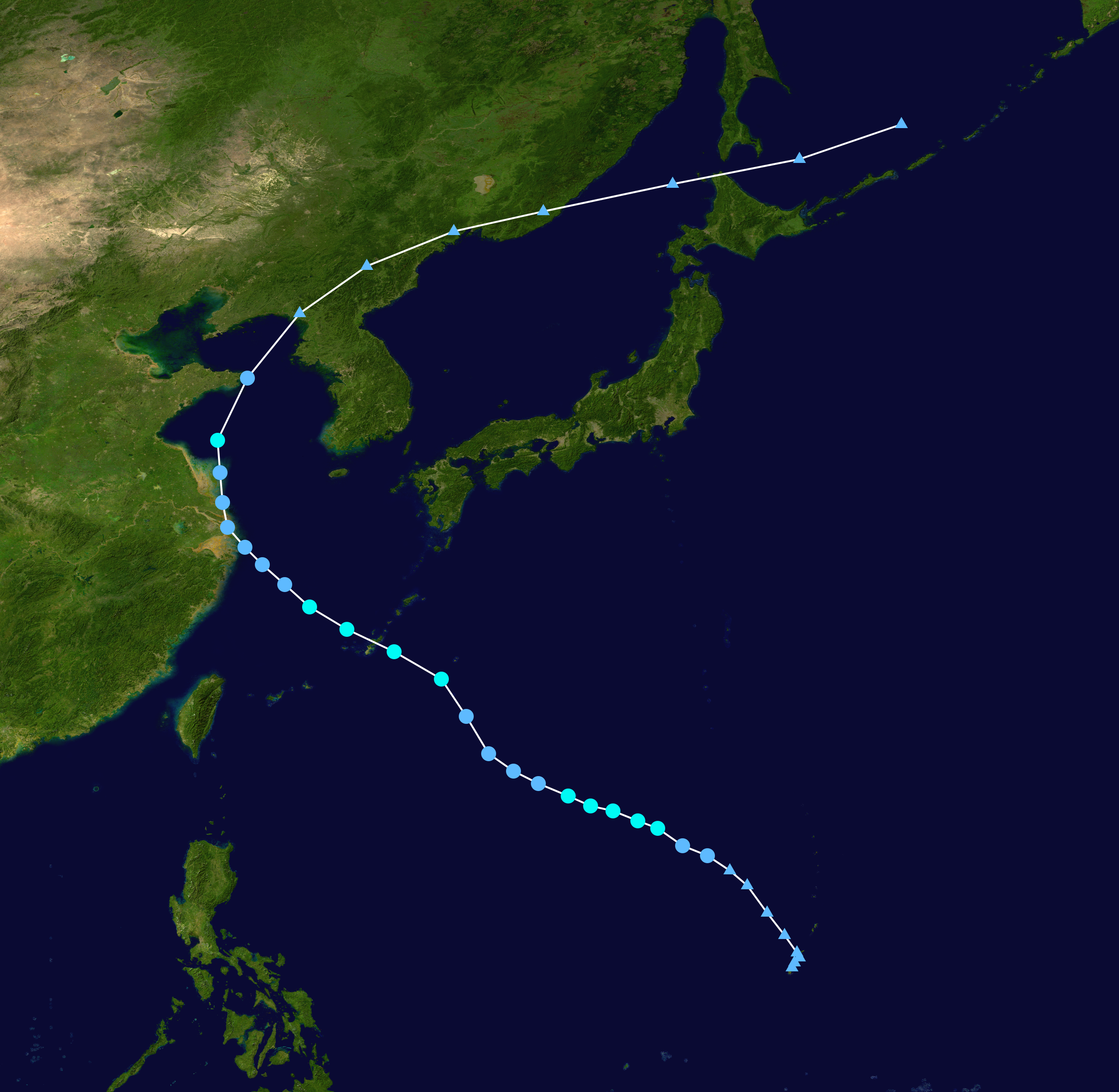
- Duration: August 20 – August 26
- Peak intensity: 75 km/h (45 mph) (1-min); 998 hPa (mbar)

07W hit Shanghai, China as a tropical depression.

=== Typhoon Kathy ===
- Typhoon (JMA)
- Category 2 typhoon (SSHWS)
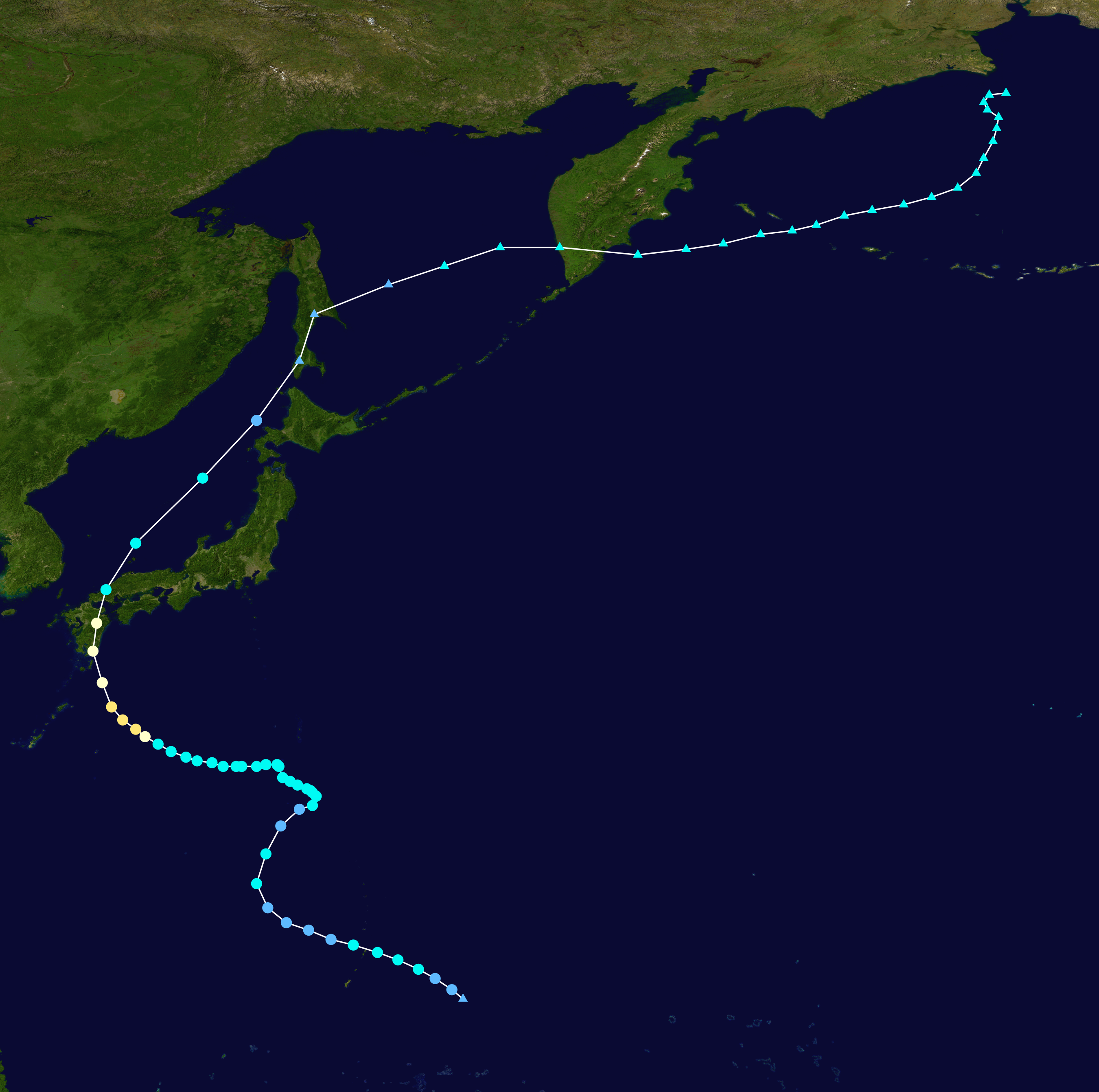
- Duration: August 28 – September 8
- Peak intensity: 165 km/h (105 mph) (1-min); 940 hPa (mbar)

Kathy hit Japan.

=== Super Typhoon June ===
- Typhoon (JMA)
- Category 4 super typhoon (SSHWS)
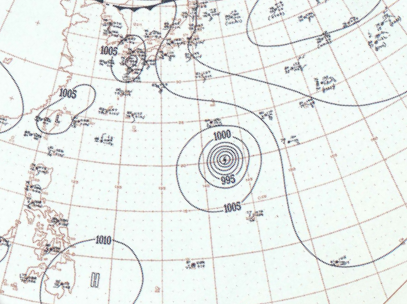
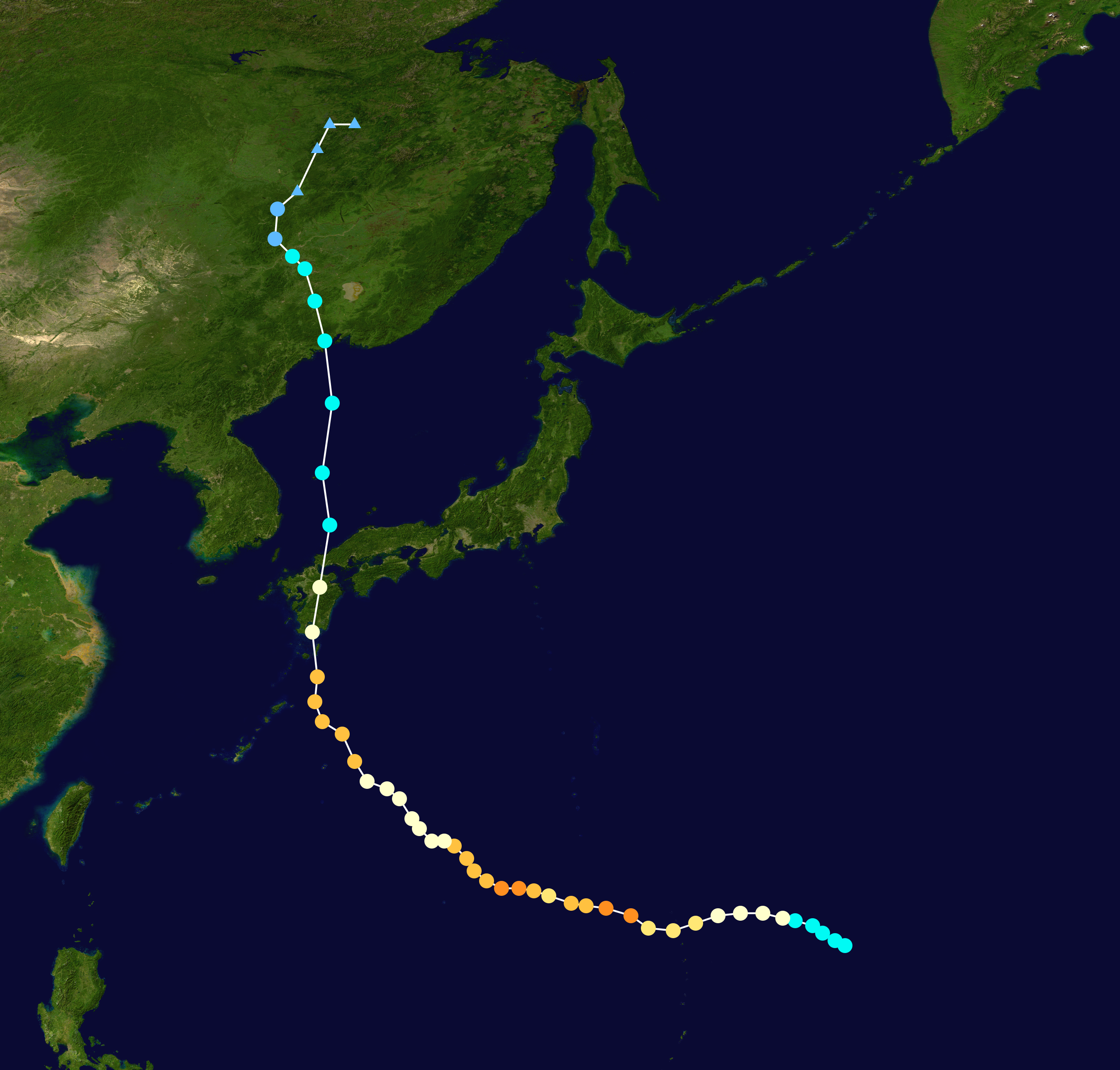
- Duration: September 4 – September 15
- Peak intensity: 240 km/h (150 mph) (1-min); 910 hPa (mbar)

June was first monitored by both the FWC and the JMA on September 4. As it started to dive southwestwards, it continued to strengthen, and became a major Category 4 storm by September 7. June slightly weakened by the middle of the day, being degraded into a Category 3 cyclone by September 8. Despite the findings of the FWC, the JMA found the typhoon even stronger than earlier, with 910 millibars (27 inHg) being reported at this time. Continued weakening took place before abruptly restrengthening while due northeast of Manila in the Philippines. By the next day, the typhoon further reintensified into a Category 4 typhoon but the JMA analysed the system as a weakened storm with a pressure of 925 millibars (27.3 inHg). On 06:00 UTC, June again weakened below that status while traveling northwestwards to north-northwestwards.The typhoon then, for the third and last time intensified again to a Category 4 typhoon by September 12 while still moving northwestwards before turning towards the north, aiming at the main Japanese islands. The storm's size further grew to 600 miles around that day, with meteorologists from Japan comparing the storm to the deadly 1934 Muroto typhoon. It then moved just west of Yakushima Island before making landfall over Shimonoseki City in Yamaguchi Prefecture by the night of September 13. On September 15, the FWC reported that the system degenerated into a “deep” extratropical low further inland. The agency would stop monitor the storm at 12:00 UTC of September 15; however, the JMA continued to track the typhoon's remnants until the same time of the next day.

During the typhoon, 107 people were killed and 39 were missing.

=== Typhoon Lorna ===
- Typhoon (JMA)
- Category 3 typhoon (SSHWS)
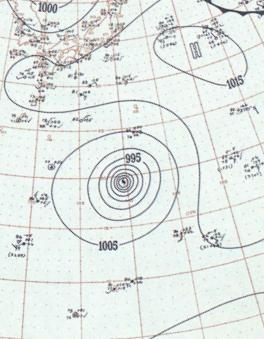
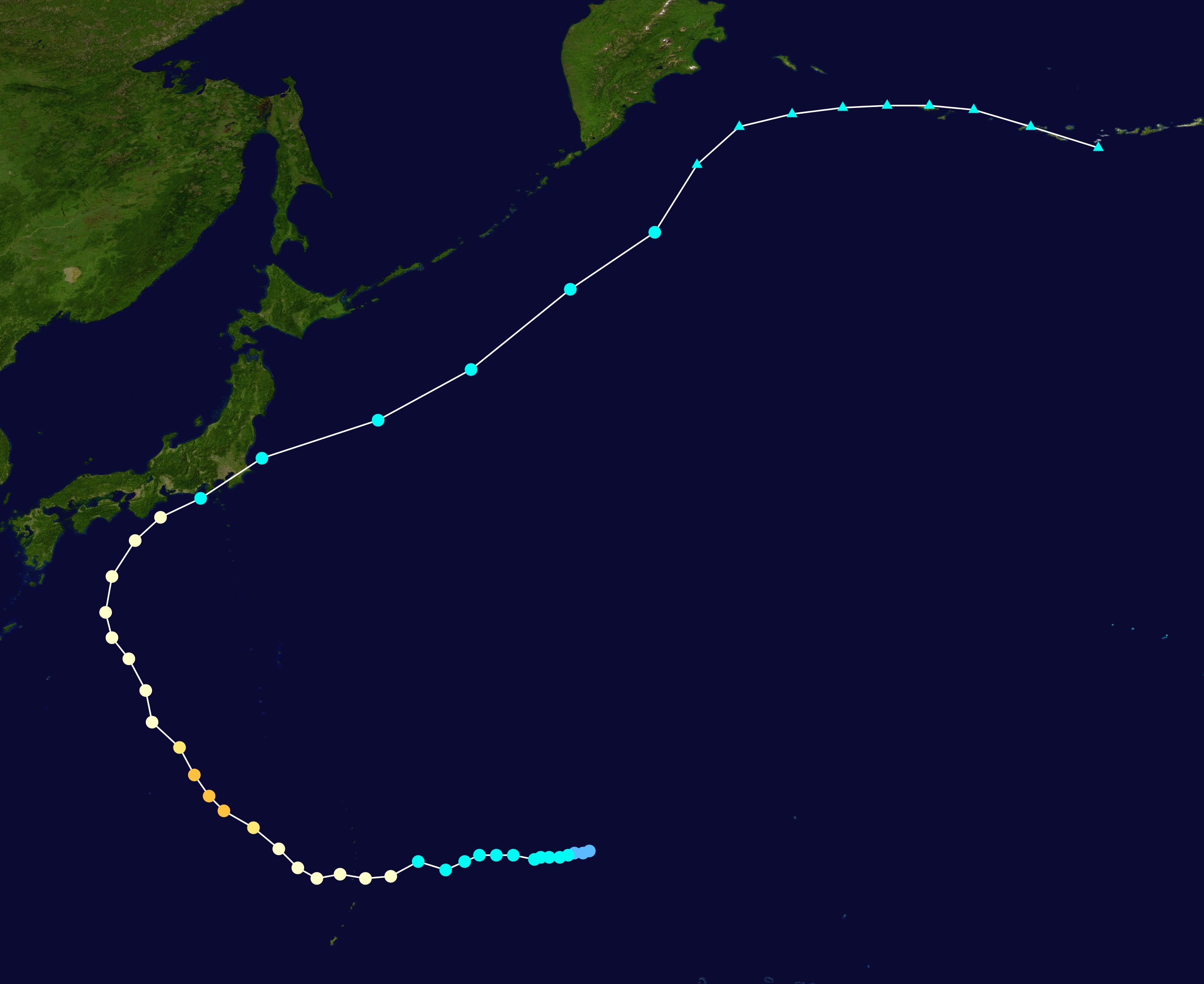
- Duration: September 11 – September 19
- Peak intensity: 185 km/h (115 mph) (1-min); 950 hPa (mbar)

Typhoon Lorna formed northeast of Guam on September 10. It intensified while moving west, becoming a typhoon by September 13 and threatening the Northern Mariana Islands. Peaking as a Category 3 storm with winds of 100 knots (190 km/h) on September 15, it passed west of the Philippines. Lorna weakened while turning north-northwest, then accelerated north-northeast on September 17, steered by a frontal system. It made landfall on Japan's Bōsō Peninsula on September 18, shortly before transitioning into an extratropical low over the Pacific. Tracking ended by September 19-22.

The storm damaged six households on Saipan. In Japan, it caused significant destruction: 34 deaths, 20 missing, and hundreds of injuries. Flooding inundated over 43,000 homes, damaged 422 houses, ruined vast areas of cropland (66,645 hectares), and sank or damaged 149 vessels. Public infrastructure was washed out. Combined with earlier Typhoon June, Lorna caused over $300 million in damage.

=== Typhoon Marie ===
- Typhoon (JMA)
- Category 1 typhoon (SSHWS)
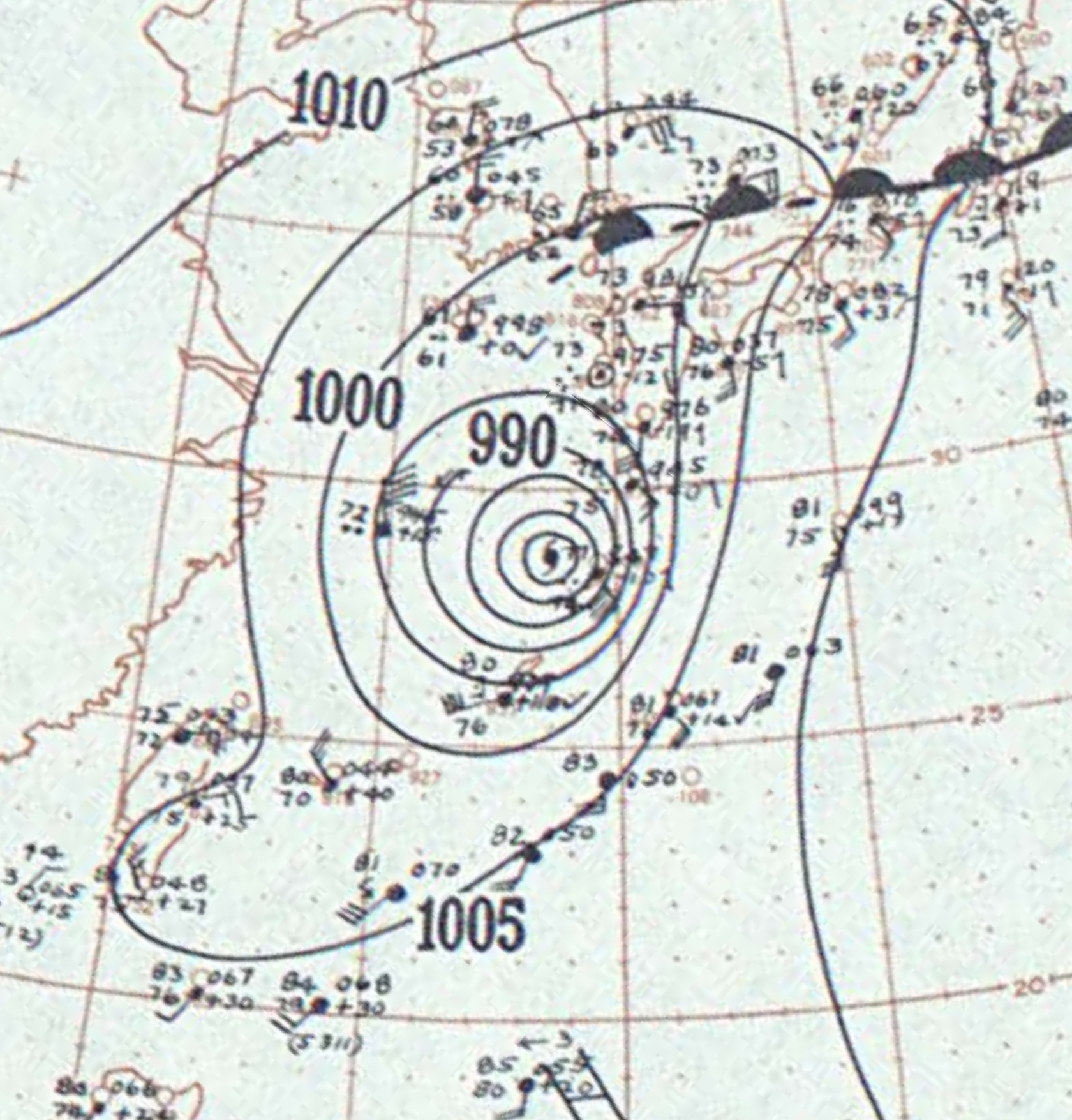
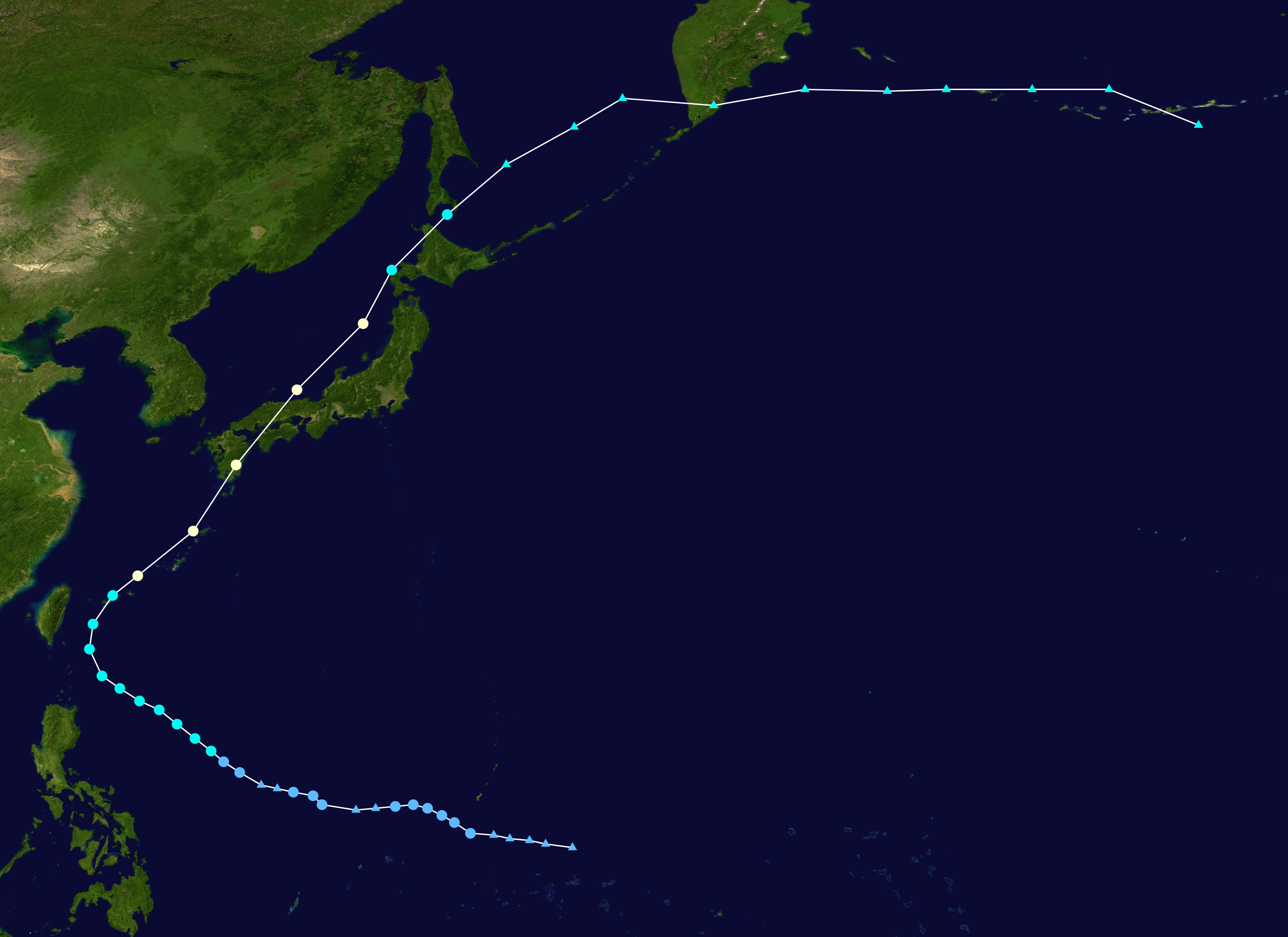
- Duration: September 19 – September 28
- Peak intensity: 140 km/h (85 mph) (1-min); 956 hPa (mbar)

Typhoon Marie had a minimum pressure of 956 mb and a maximum windspeeds of 85 mph. On September 26, Typhoon Marie hit Japan. After passing Kyushu and Chugoku, Marie proceeded through the Sea of Japan northeast at a tremendous speed and hit Hokkaido before turning extratropical. The storm eventually dissipated on September 28.

Due to Marie, some Seikan ferries such as Tōya Maru that departed from Hakodate Port, suffered a gale and high waves. Tōya Maru sank, 1,361 people were killed and 400 were left missing. Due to this disaster, the typhoon is known in Japan as the Toya Maru Typhoon.

Also, a large fire broke out in Iwanai, Hokkaido, partly due to the effects of Marie. This fire was called Fire of Iwanai (岩内大火) in Japan.

=== Typhoon Nancy ===
- Typhoon (JMA)
- Category 2 typhoon (SSHWS)
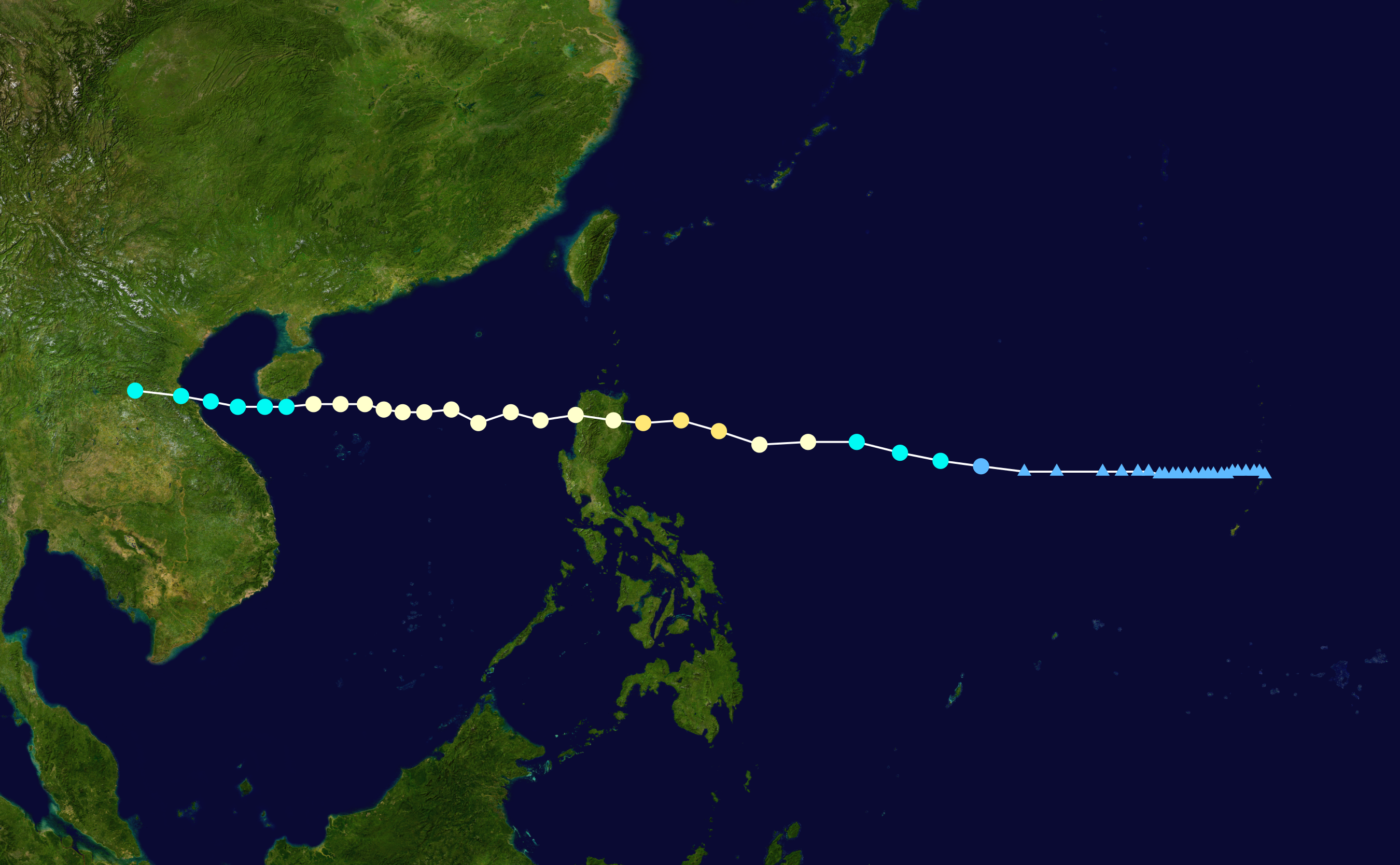
- Duration: September 30 – October 13
- Peak intensity: 155 km/h (100 mph) (1-min); 965 hPa (mbar)

Nancy hit the Philippines as a Category 2 typhoon.

=== Typhoon Olga ===
- Typhoon (JMA)
- Category 3 typhoon (SSHWS)
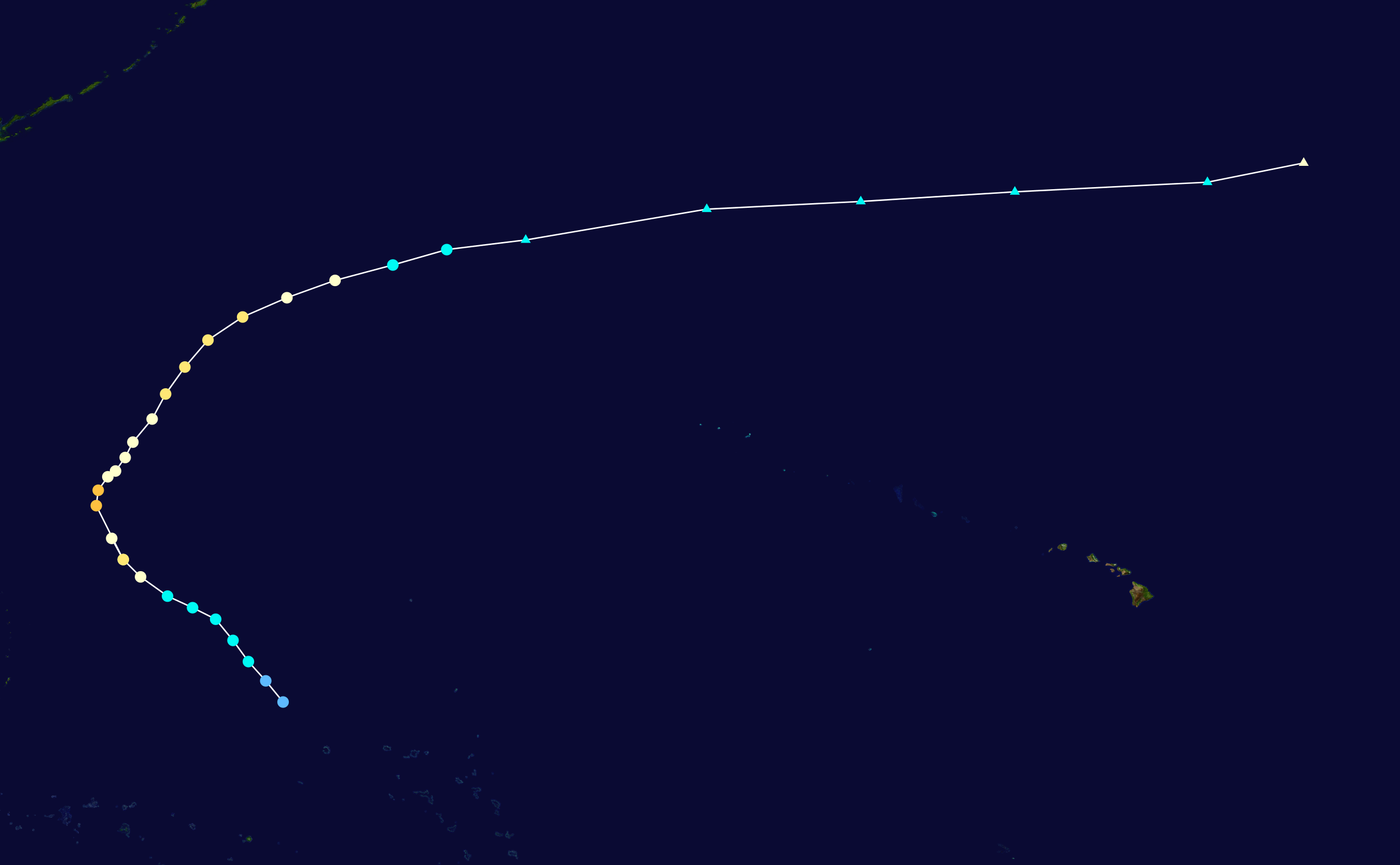
- Duration: October 12 – October 19
- Peak intensity: 185 km/h (115 mph) (1-min); 935 hPa (mbar)

Olga was a Category 3 typhoon that remained out to sea.

=== Tropical Storm 15W ===
- Tropical storm (JMA)
- Tropical storm (SSHWS)
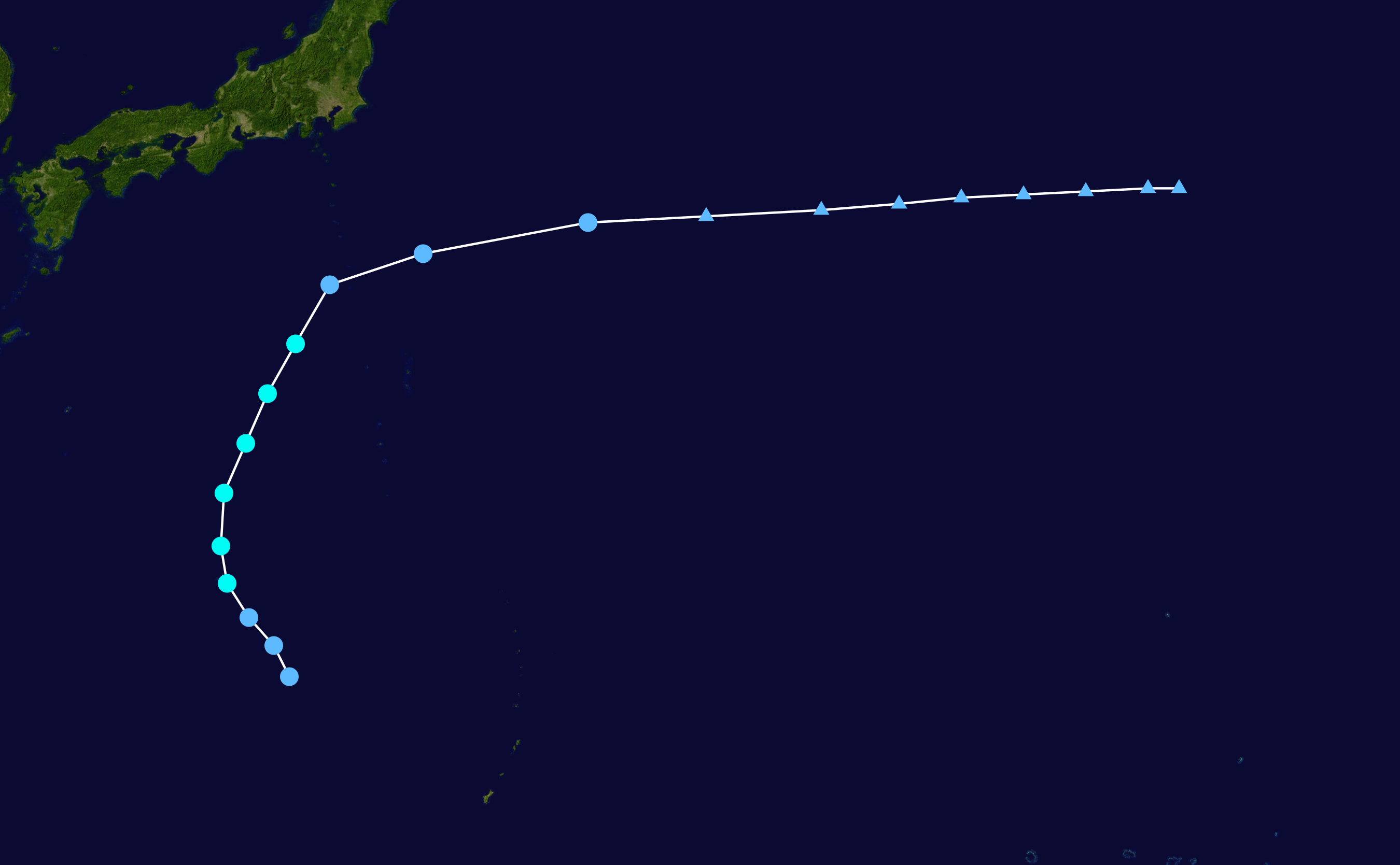
- Duration: October 24 – October 26
- Peak intensity: 75 km/h (45 mph) (1-min); 1004 hPa (mbar)

15W was a weak tropical storm that didn't affect land.

=== Super Typhoon Pamela ===
- Typhoon (JMA)
- Category 5 super typhoon (SSHWS)
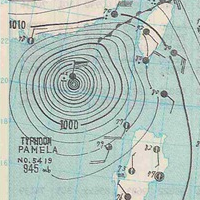
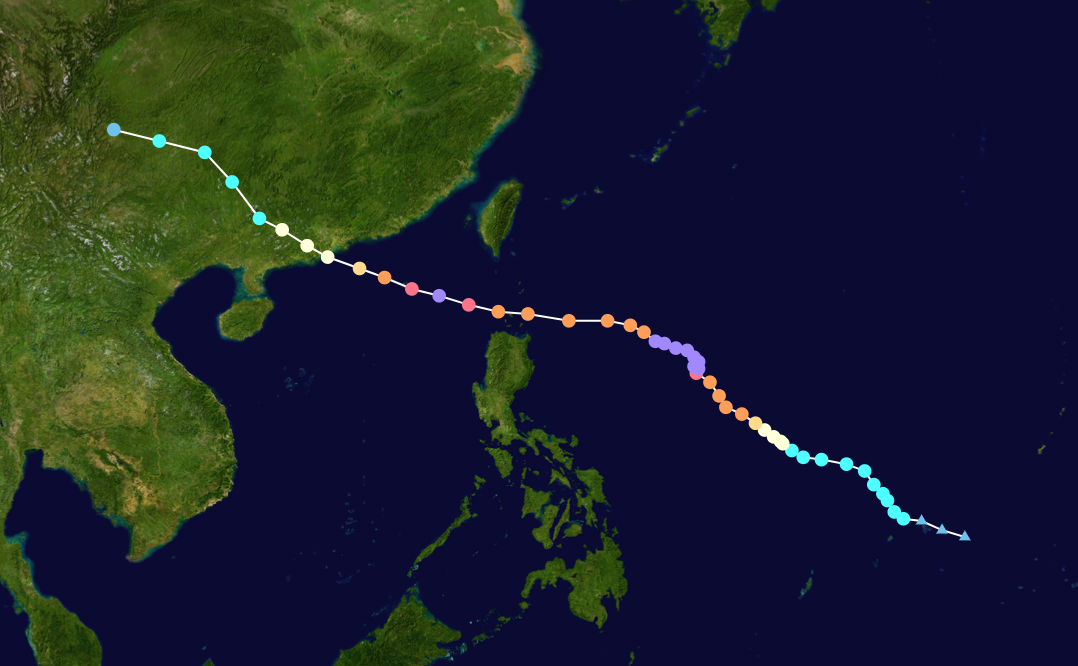
- Duration: October 27 – November 8
- Peak intensity: 280 km/h (175 mph) (1-min); 900 hPa (mbar)

On October 27, Typhoon Pamela formed as a tropical depression. Pamela reached a peak of 900 mbar and 175 mph on November 1 and reached a secondary peak of 935 mbars on November 5. Gusts at landfall just to the west of Macau reached 175 km/h in Waglan Island and 155 km/h in Hong Kong Observatory which were the strongest since November 10, 1900 when the mean hourly wind speed reached 113 km/h (71 mph or 61 kts) at the Royal Observatory in Tsim Sha Tsui, in par with Typhoon Gloria. Pamela was one of four storms that reached Category 5 super typhoon status in the South China Sea, with others being Typhoon Rammasun of 2014, Typhoon Rai of 2021 and Typhoon Yagi of 2024.

=== Super Typhoon Ruby ===
- Typhoon (JMA)
- Category 5 super typhoon (SSHWS)
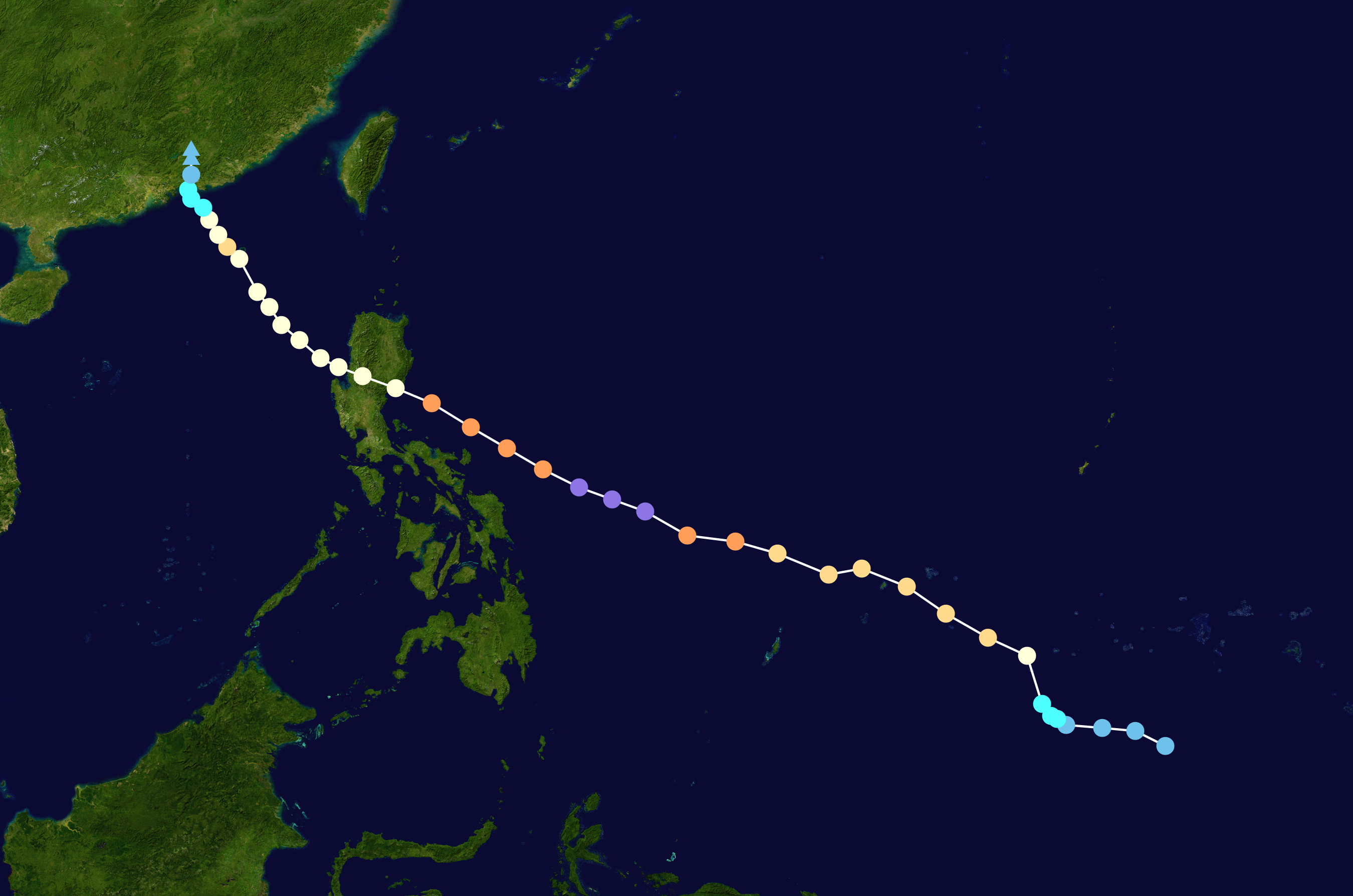
- Duration: November 2 – November 11
- Peak intensity: 270 km/h (165 mph) (1-min); 925 hPa (mbar)

Ruby hit the Philippines as a typhoon, and hit China as a tropical storm.

=== Super Typhoon Sally ===
- Typhoon (JMA)
- Category 5 super typhoon (SSHWS)
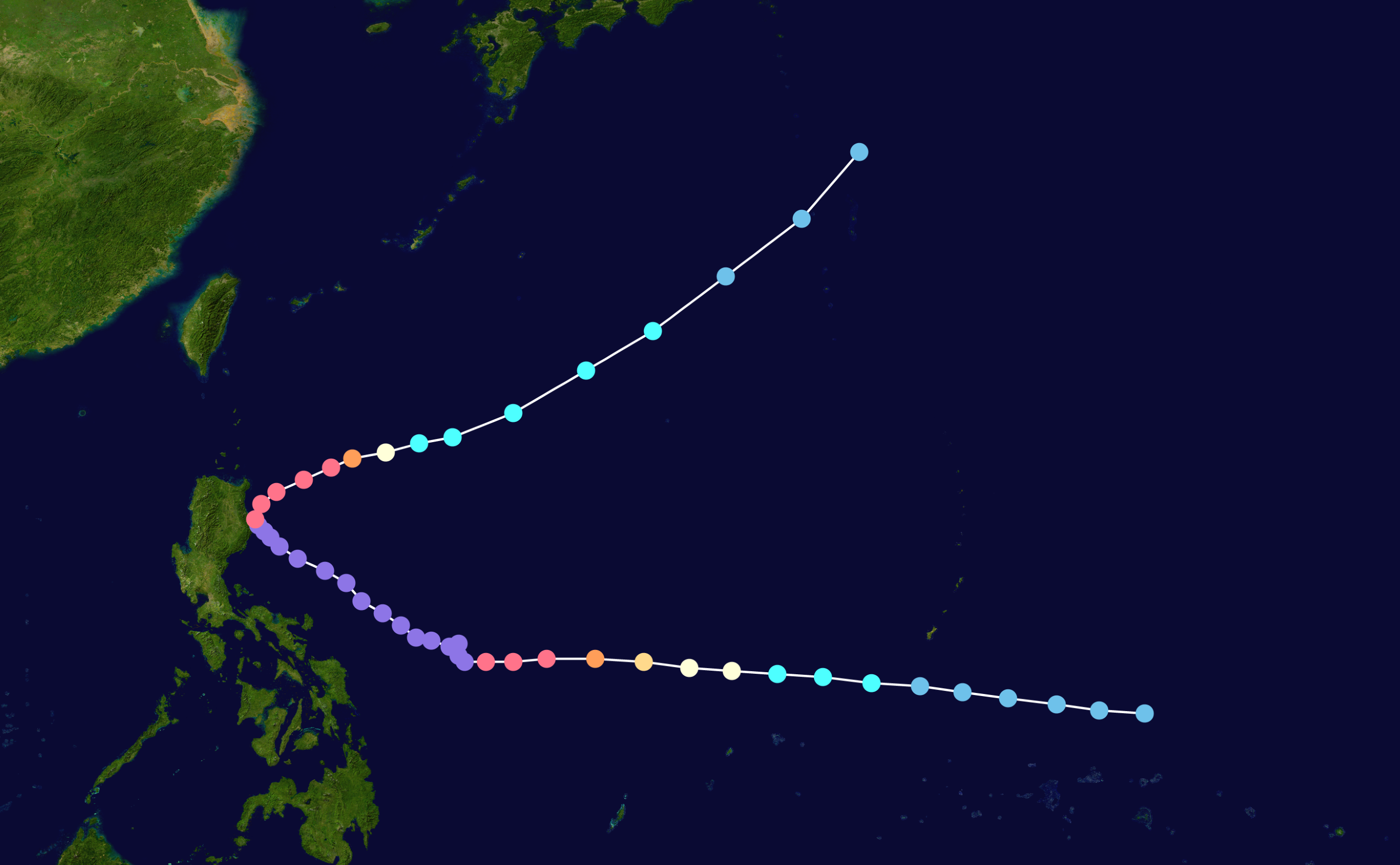
- Duration: November 10 – November 20
- Peak intensity: 280 km/h (175 mph) (1-min); 925 hPa (mbar)

Sally brushed the Philippines as a Category 5 typhoon.

=== Typhoon Tilda ===
- Typhoon (JMA)
- Category 4 typhoon (SSHWS)
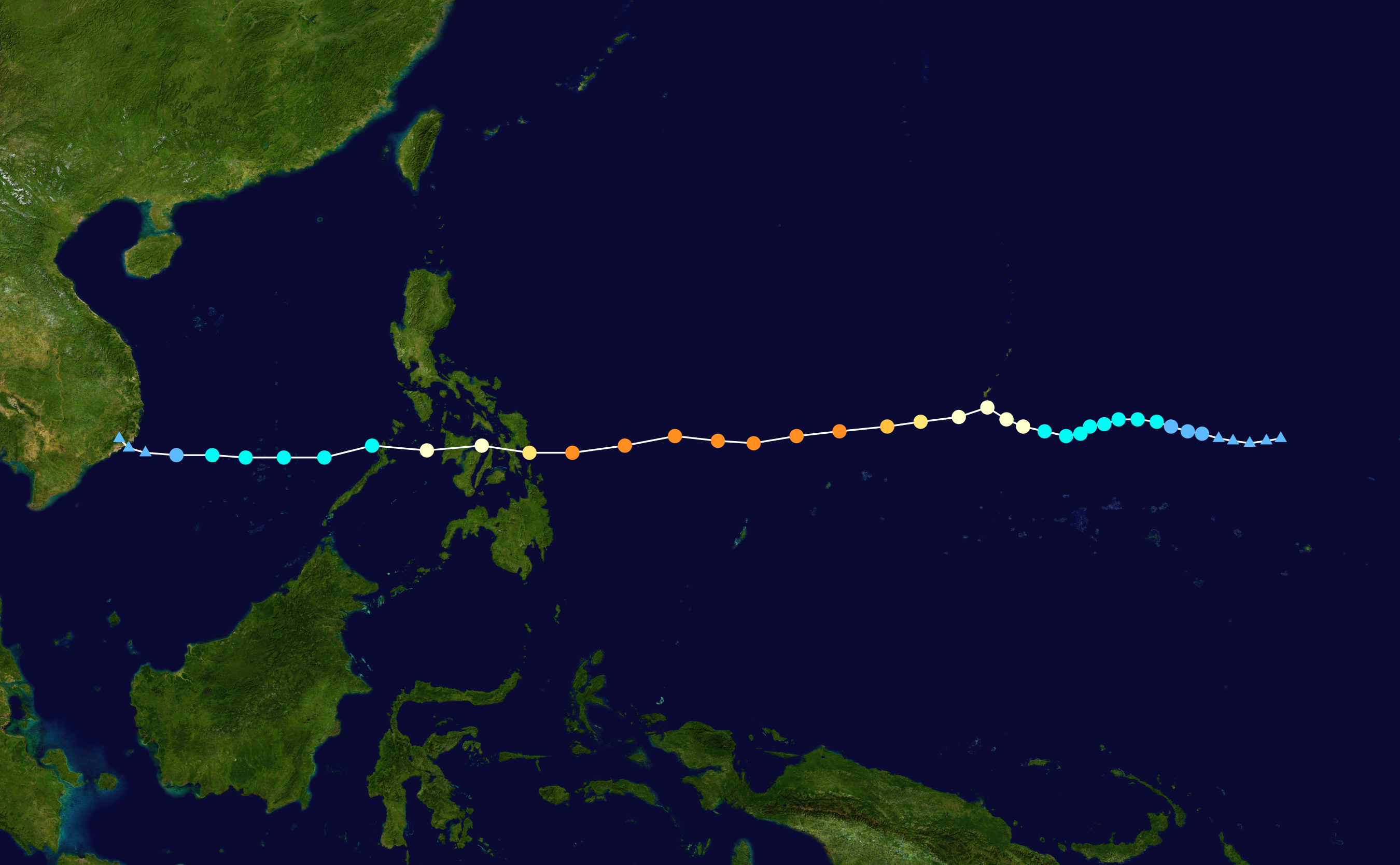
- Duration: November 22 – December 1
- Peak intensity: 230 km/h (145 mph) (1-min); 940 hPa (mbar)

Tilda hit the Philippines as a typhoon and dissipated near Vietnam.

== Storm names ==
- Elsie
- Flossie
- Grace
- Helen
- Ida
- June
- Kathy
- Lorna
- Marie
- Nancy
- Olga
- Pamela
- Ruby
- Sally
- Tilda

== See also ==
- 1954 Pacific hurricane season
- 1954 Atlantic hurricane season
- 1950s North Indian Ocean cyclone seasons
- 1950s Australian region cyclone seasons
- Australian region cyclone seasons: 1953–54 1954–55
- South Pacific cyclone seasons: 1953–54 1954–55
- South-West Indian Ocean cyclone seasons: 1953–54 1954–55
