= Tropical Storm Kammuri (2008) =

Pacific severe tropical storm in 2008

Severe Tropical Storm Kammuri (Julian)
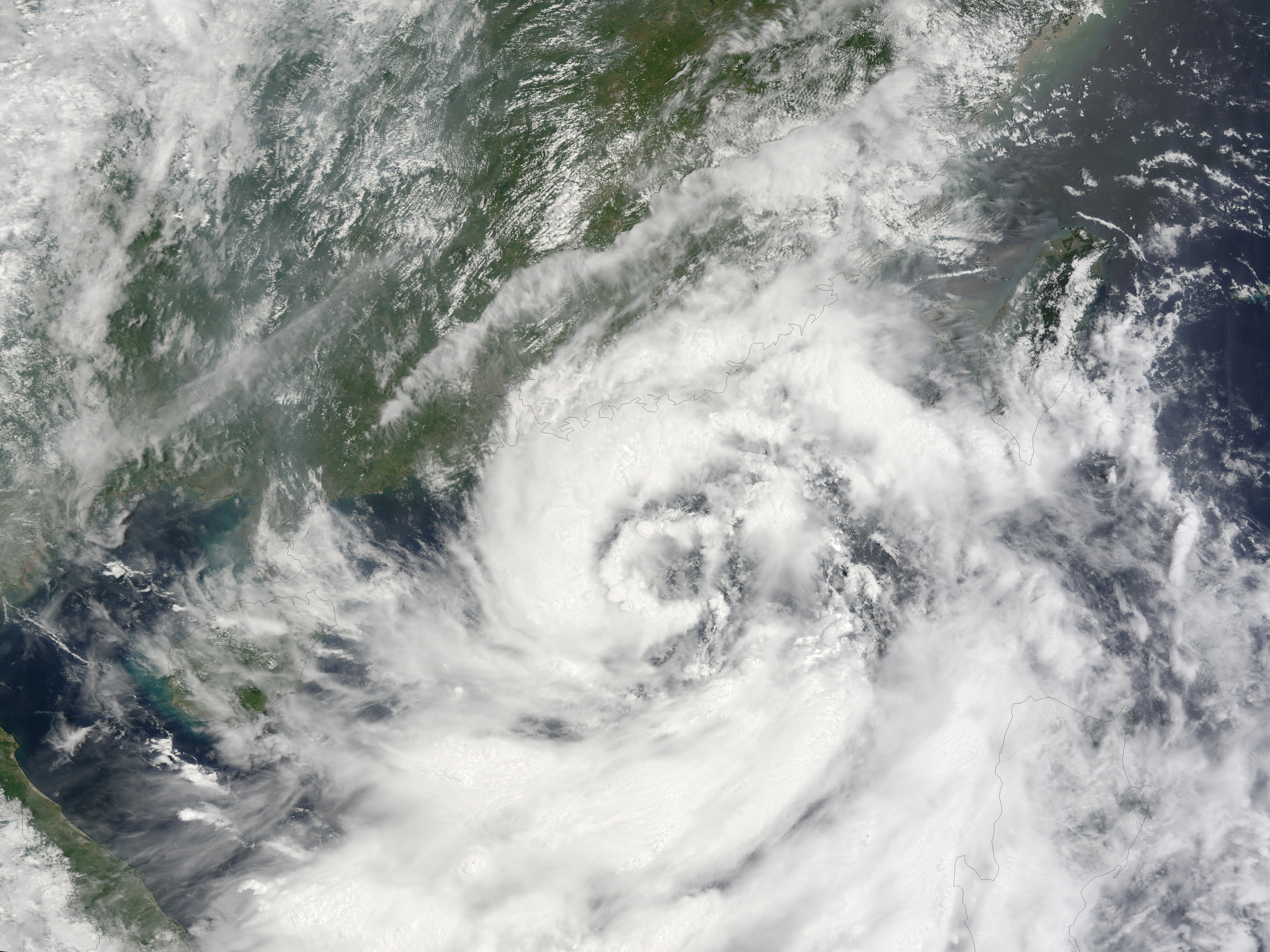
- Severe Tropical Storm Kammuri at peak intensity on August 6

Meteorological history
- Formed: August 3, 2008
- Dissipated: August 8, 2008

Severe tropical storm
- 10-minute sustained (JMA)
- Highest winds: 95 km/h (60 mph)
- Lowest pressure: 975 hPa (mbar); 28.79 inHg

Tropical storm
- 1-minute sustained (SSHWS/JTWC)
- Highest winds: 95 km/h (60 mph)
- Lowest pressure: 985 hPa (mbar); 29.09 inHg

Overall effects
- Fatalities: 204 total
- Damage: $200 million (2008 USD)
- Areas affected: Philippines, China, Vietnam, Hong Kong
- IBTrACS
- Part of the 2008 Pacific typhoon season

Severe Tropical Storm Kammuri, (Note: The name Kammuri was contributed by Japan (Japanese: カンムリ, [kã̠mːɯ̟ɾʲi]) and refers to the constellation Corona Borealis, the northern crown, in Japanese.) known in the Philippines as Tropical Storm Julian, was a weak but deadly tropical storm which impacted the Philippines, China, Vietnam, and Hong Kong in early August 2008. The ninth named storm of the 2008 Pacific typhoon season, Kammuri developed as a tropical depression on August 4 north of Luzon. The next day, the depression intensified into a tropical storm, resulting in the Japan Meteorological Agency naming it Kammuri. The following day, Kammuri reached its peak intensity with sustained winds of 50 kn (93 km/h) before making landfall in Guangdong province, China. This would make Kammuri weaken into a tropical storm that evening, resulting in the JTWC issuing their last advisory on the system. Kammuri would later emerge in the Gulf of Tonkin the next day, making a second landfall over Guangxi province, China. After Kammuri made landfall, the JMA issued its final advisory on Kammuri.

Heavy rains from Kammuri in Vietnam led to the loss of at least 100 lives and destroyed over 300 homes while damaging over 3,500 others.

== Meteorological history ==
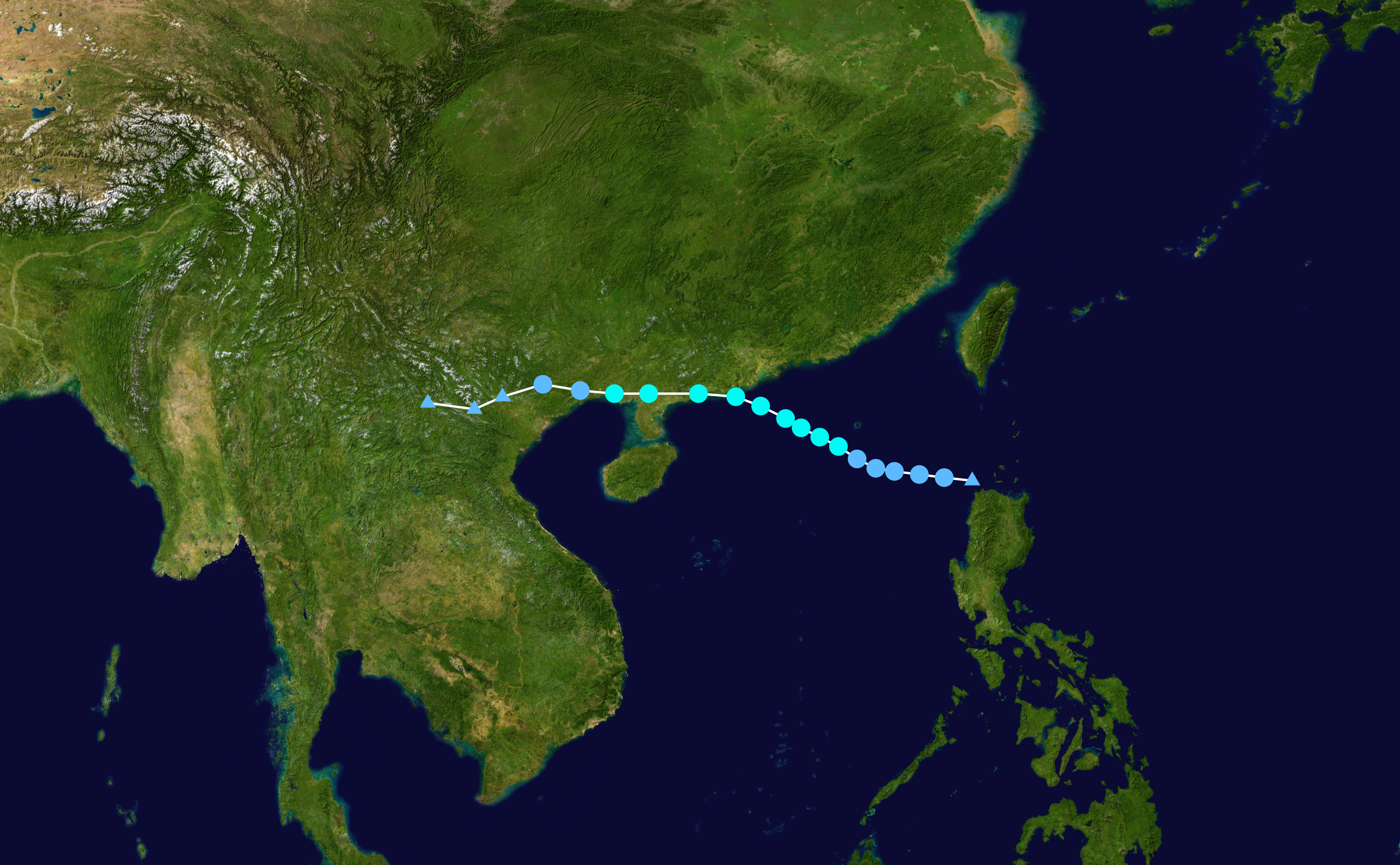
Map plotting the storm's track and intensity, according to the Saffir–Simpson scale Map key Saffir–Simpson scale Tropical depression (≤38 mph, ≤62 km/h) Tropical storm (39–73 mph, 63–118 km/h) Category 1 (74–95 mph, 119–153 km/h) Category 2 (96–110 mph, 154–177 km/h) Category 3 (111–129 mph, 178–208 km/h) Category 4 (130–156 mph, 209–251 km/h) Category 5 (≥157 mph, ≥252 km/h) Unknown Storm type Tropical cyclone Subtropical cyclone Extratropical cyclone, remnant low, tropical disturbance, or monsoon depression

On August 3, PAGASA identified a tropical disturbance which was located in the South China Sea to the north of Luzon island in the Philippines and was later classified as Tropical Depression Julian. Later that day the Japan Meteorological Agency (JMA) designated Julian as a minor tropical depression and initiated advisories on the tropical depression.

Early the next day the JMA started to issue full advisories on the tropical depression. The Joint Typhoon Warning Center (JTWC) then started to issue warnings on the tropical depression later that day with them designating it as Tropical Depression 10W. Furthermore, later that day both PAGASA and the JTWC upgraded the tropical depression to a tropical storm.

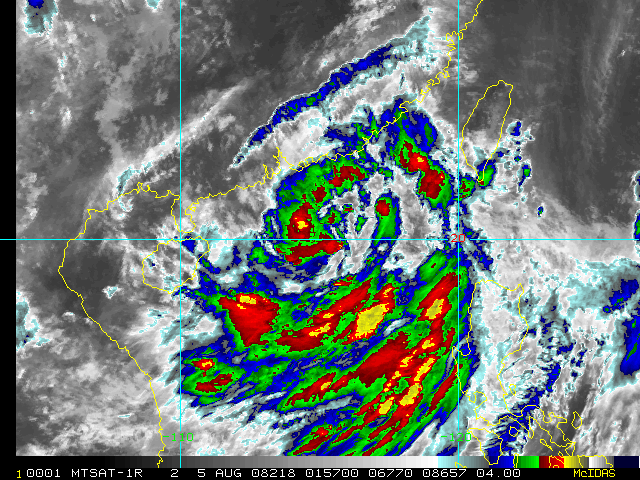
Infra-red satellite image of Tropical Storm Kammuri intensifying on August 5

On August 5, the JMA upgraded the depression to a tropical storm and named it Kammuri, whilst PAGASA released their final advisory on Tropical Storm Kammuri (Julian) later that day as it moved out of their Area of Responsibility and headed towards mainland China. The Hong Kong Observatory (HKO) then upgraded Kammuri to a severe tropical storm late on August 5, with the JMA doing the same early the next morning.

However, Kammuri started to weaken after making landfall along the south coast of China in the Western Guangdong Province at about 12pm UTC on August 6. After Kammuri had made landfall the JMA downgraded Kammuri to a tropical storm, whilst the JTWC issued their final advisory later that day on Tropical Storm Kammuri. Early the next day Tropical Storm Kammuri emerged into the Gulf of Tonkin, however later that day Kammuri made landfall again in the Guangxi province of China. After making landfall for the second time on August 7 Kammuri weakened to a tropical depression as the JMA issued its final advisory. However the JMA continued to monitor the depression in their WWJP25 warnings until early on August 8.

== Preparations ==
=== Philippines ===
As Tropical Depression Julian formed to the north of the Philippines On August 3, PAGASA issued Storm Signal #1, a warning for winds of 30–60 km/h (19–37 mph), for parts of Luzon. The parts of Luzon that were under Public Storm Signal #1 included the Batanes Group of Islands, Babuyan Group of Islands, Calayan Group of Islands, northern Cagayan, Apayao, Ilocos Norte, Ilocos Sur, Abra and La Union. Early on the afternoon of August 4 PAGASA lowered Storm Signal #1 for all regions of Luzon except for Ilocos Norte, Ilocos Sur, Abra, La Union. Early the next morning they lowered the rest of the Public Warning Signals as they released their final advisory on Julian.

=== China ===
==== Macau ====
Late on August 5, the weather bureau of Macau hoisted the Gale or Storm Signal No.8, whilst earlier in the day they had hoisted Strong Wind Signal No.3. The weather bureau of Macau then replaced signal No.8 with signal No.3 as the storm moved away from Macau.

==== Hong Kong ====
Early on August 4, the Hong Kong Observatory (HKO) started to issue public warnings on a tropical depression which was located within 500 nmi (930 km) of Hong Kong. Within their first advisory on Kammuri the HKO raised the Standby Signal No.1 for Hong Kong Late the next day the HKO hoisted the Strong Wind Signal No.3 which meant that winds above 25 mph (40 km/h) were expected to be blowing in Hong Kong within 12 hours. However, during the morning of August 6 the HKO issued the Northeast Gale or Storm Signal No.8. Later that day, the HKO hoisted the Southeast Gale or Storm Signal No.8, which was replacing the 8NE Warning However nine hours later the HKO removed the 8SE warning and downgraded it to Signal No.3 later that day, which was in force for 11 hours before it was downgraded to Signal 1 which was in force for 3 hours before all signals were cancelled.

== Impact ==
=== Philippines ===
Tropical Storm Julian (Kammuri) did not make landfall in the Philippines. However, it enhanced the southwest monsoon which continued to bring heavy rain to the Philippines. However, no damage was reported in the Philippines

=== China ===
Kammuri affected athletes training for the Olympics which were about to be held within China and Hong Kong.

==== Macau ====
Kammuri caused ferry services between Macau and Guangdong Province to close down. Bus services were cancelled with most plane flights cancelled or severely delayed

==== Hong Kong ====
The impact of Tropical Storm Kammuri was felt strongly in Hong Kong, shortly before its landfall in China, with at least 37 people being injured. The public transport service were halted or reduced and as significant cross winds affected the Hong Kong International Airport the Airport Authority had to cancel or delay over 380 flights with five others diverted to other airports. There were also over 40 reports of fallen trees and collapsed scaffoldings in various districts of Hong Kong. There was a report of a landslide in Tai Hang. At least 10 people had to be evacuated in Kwun Tong as the zinc roof of their hut was blown away.

=== Vietnam ===
In Vietnam, at least 127 fatalities would occur while 34 others were missing since Kammuri caused flash flooding and landslides. Entire towns and villages were cut off. Hundreds of tourists were also landlocked in Sa Pa and in Lào Cai.

== See also ==
- Other tropical cyclones named Kammuri
- Other tropical cyclones named Julian
- Timeline of the 2008 Pacific typhoon season
