= Tropical Storm Kammuri (2002) =

Pacific severe tropical storm in 2002

Severe Tropical Storm Kammuri (Lagalag)
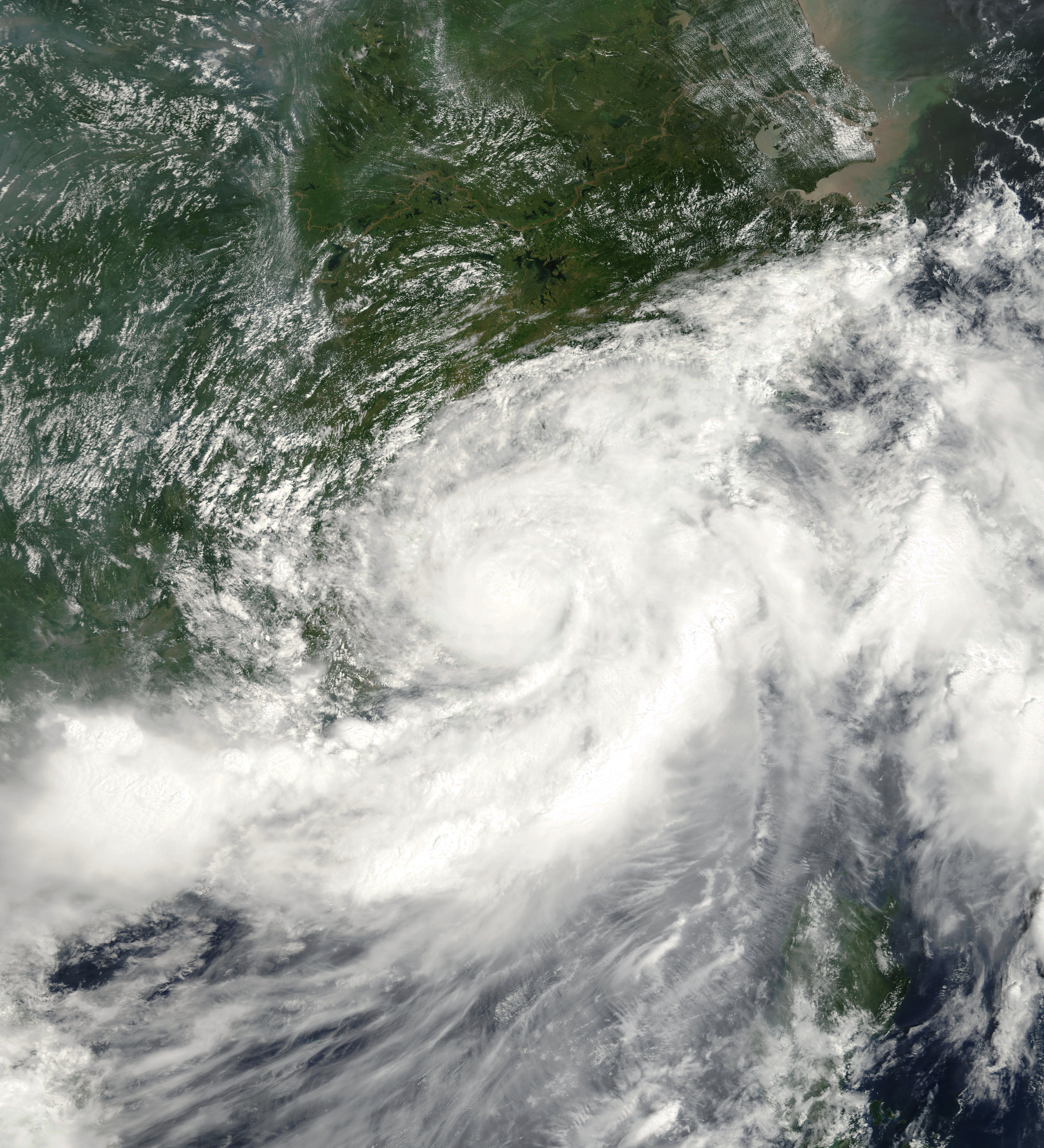
- Tropical Storm Kammuri making landfall in Guangdong on August 5

Meteorological history
- Formed: August 2, 2002
- Dissipated: August 7, 2002

Severe tropical storm
- 10-minute sustained (JMA)
- Highest winds: 100 km/h (65 mph)
- Lowest pressure: 980 hPa (mbar); 28.94 inHg

Tropical storm
- 1-minute sustained (SSHWS/JTWC)
- Highest winds: 95 km/h (60 mph)
- Lowest pressure: 987 hPa (mbar); 29.15 inHg

Overall effects
- Fatalities: 153
- Damage: $509 million (2002 USD)
- Areas affected: China, Taiwan, Okinawa, South Korea
- IBTrACS
- Part of the 2002 Pacific typhoon season

Severe Tropical Storm Kammuri, (Note: The name Kammuri was contributed by Japan (Japanese: カンムリ, [kã̠mːɯ̟ɾʲi]) and refers to the constellation Corona Borealis, the northern crown, in Japanese.) known in the Philippines as Tropical Storm Lagalag, killed hundreds of people in the wake of a deadly flood season in China. The system developed from a large monsoonal system that persisted toward the end of July 2002 near the Philippines. On August 2, a tropical depression formed off the northwest coast of Luzon and moved west-northwestward. Late on August 3, it intensified into Tropical Storm Kammuri off the coast of Hong Kong. A weakening ridge turned the storm northward toward the coast of China. The storm made landfall with late on August 4, after reaching peak winds of 100 km/h (65 mph). The system dissipated over the mountainous coastline of eastern China and merged with a cold front on August 7.

High rainfall from Kammuri affected large portions of China, particularly in Guangdong Province where it moved ashore. In that province, over 100,000 people had to evacuate due to flooding and after 6,810 houses were destroyed. The floods damaged roads, railroads, and tunnels, and left power and water outages across the region. Rainfall was beneficial in alleviating drought conditions in Guangdong, although further inland the rains occurred after months of deadly flooding. In Hunan Province, the storm's remnants merged with a cold front, destroying 12,400 houses. Across its path, the floods damaged or destroyed 245,000 houses and destroyed 60 ha (150 acres) of crop fields. Kammuri caused 153 deaths, most of which were related to the remnants, and damage was estimated at $509 million (¥4.219 billion yuan). (Note: This total and all others in the article were originally reported in Chinese yuan. Totals were converted via the Oanda Corporation website.)

== Meteorological history ==
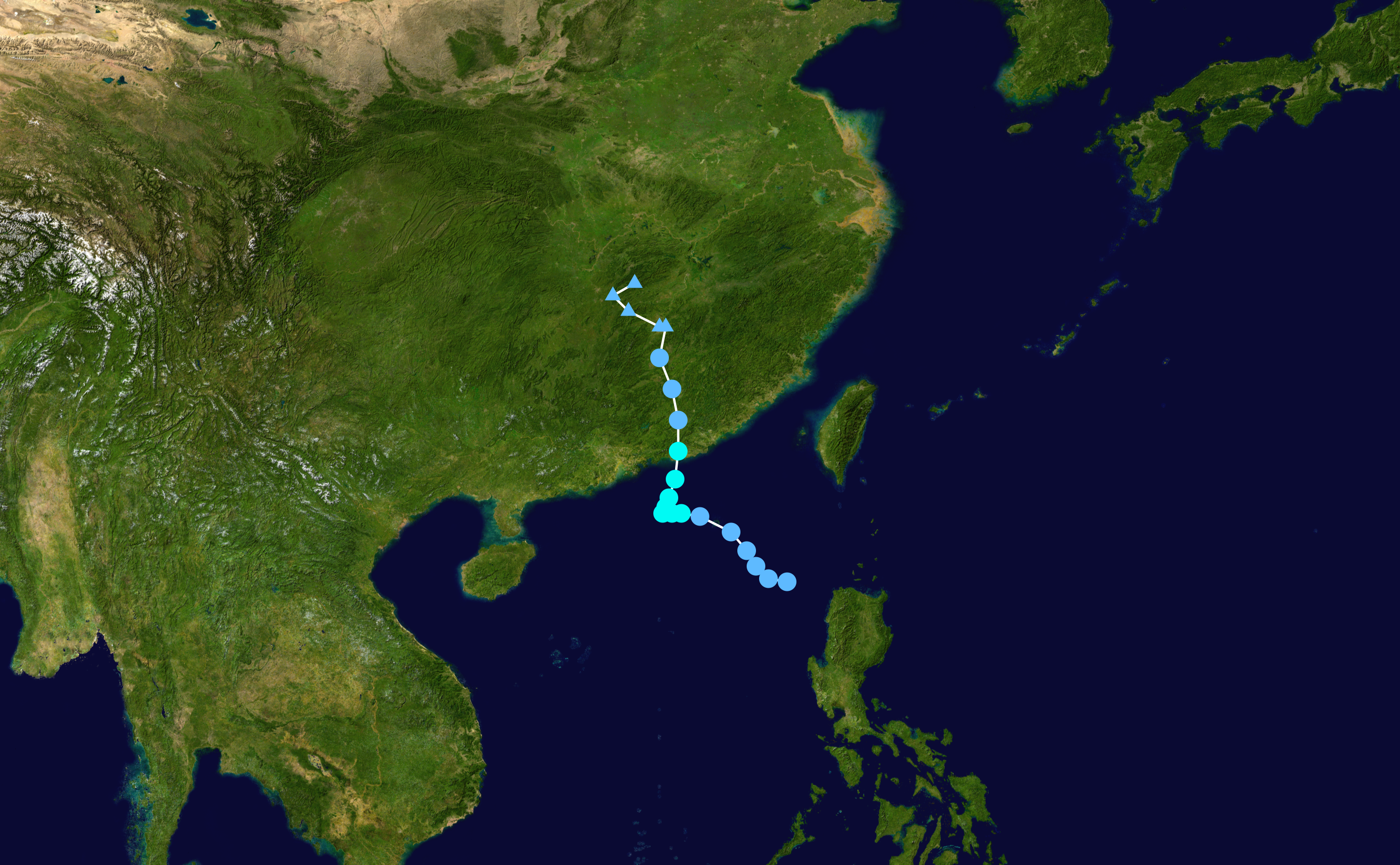
Map plotting the storm's track and intensity, according to the Saffir–Simpson scale Map key Saffir–Simpson scale Tropical depression (≤38 mph, ≤62 km/h) Tropical storm (39–73 mph, 63–118 km/h) Category 1 (74–95 mph, 119–153 km/h) Category 2 (96–110 mph, 154–177 km/h) Category 3 (111–129 mph, 178–208 km/h) Category 4 (130–156 mph, 209–251 km/h) Category 5 (≥157 mph, ≥252 km/h) Unknown Storm type Tropical cyclone Subtropical cyclone Extratropical cyclone, remnant low, tropical disturbance, or monsoon depression

The origins of Kammuri are uncertain; they were possibly related to the monsoon trough that moved across the Philippines toward Guam. In late July, a large area of convection persisted in the Philippine Sea, organizing enough for the Philippine Atmospheric, Geophysical and Astronomical Services Administration (PAGASA) to initiate advisories on Tropical Depression Lagalag on August 1. Around that time, the system had several weak circulations, one of which persisted in the South China Sea; this center was located east of an area of thunderstorms due to moderate wind shear. Early on August 2, the Japan Meteorological Agency (JMA) (Note: The Japan Meteorological Agency is the official Regional Specialized Meteorological Center for the western Pacific Ocean.) classified the system as a tropical depression to the north of Luzon. Shortly thereafter, the Joint Typhoon Warning Center (JTWC) (Note: The Joint Typhoon Warning Center is a joint United States Navy–United States Air Force task force that issues tropical cyclone warnings for the western Pacific Ocean and other regions.) followed suit by initiating advisories on Tropical Depression 16W, and the Hong Kong Observatory (HKO) followed suit early on August 3. Initially, it moved generally to the west-northwest, owing to a mid-level ridge over eastern China. The convection became more concentrated, and the JMA upgraded the depression to Tropical Storm Kammuri late on August 3, to the south of Hong Kong.

An upper-level low connected to a trough weakened the ridge over China, allowing Kammuri to move slowly northward. Continued wind shear initially prevented the thunderstorms from being located over the center, although the shear gradually decreased, allowing the convection to organize. Kammuri quickly intensified into a severe tropical storm; the JMA estimated peak 10-minute sustained winds of 100 km/h (65 mph) at 1800 UTC on August 4. The JTWC estimated the storm was weaker, with 1-minute winds of 95 km/h (60 mph). At around 2300 UTC on August 4, Kammuri made landfall east of Hong Kong in Guangdong Province, just east of Shanwei. An approaching mid-latitude storm caused it to accelerate over land. Kammuri quickly weakened to a tropical depression, and the JTWC discontinued advisories at 1200 UTC on August 5. The JMA continued tracking the system until Kammuri dissipated on August 7 over central China. The remnants were absorbed by a cold front.

== Preparations, impact, and aftermath ==
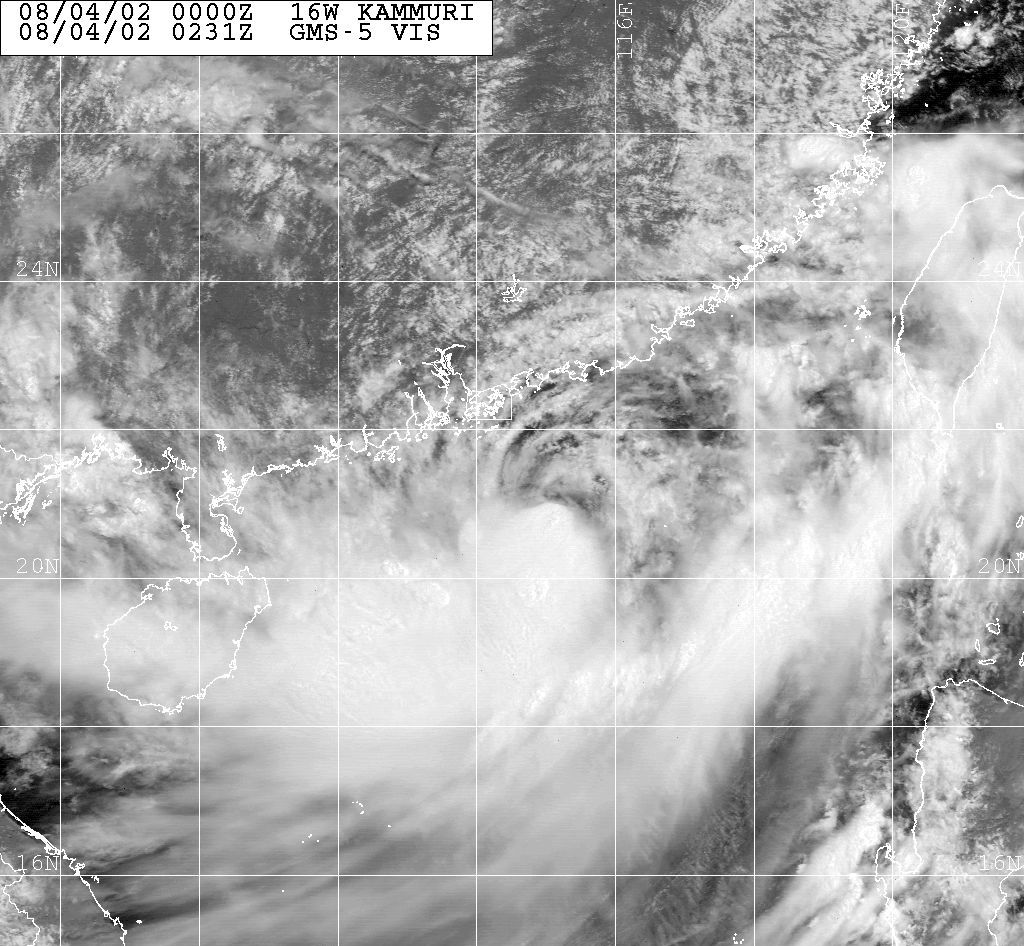
Tropical Storm Kammuri intensifying in the South China Sea on August 4

On August 3, when Kammuri was located about 390 km (240 mi) southeast of Hong Kong, the HKO issued Standby Signal No. 1, the first such signal for a storm that season. By that time, the outer rainbands had begun affecting the region. Kammuri dropped heavy rainfall in Hong Kong that reached 280 mm (11 in) in the town of Kwai Chung, most of which fell after the storm passed the region. The rains caused one landslide and damaged one road. Wind gusts in the city reached 99 km/h (62 mph), and sustained winds of 65 km/h (40 mph) were reported on Waglan Island. There, a storm surge of 0.49 m (1.6 ft) was also reported. In nearby Macau, outer rainbands delayed airplane flights, and there was some flooding.

In Guangdong Province where Kammuri made landfall, rainfall peaked at 275 mm (10.8 in) in Jieyang, and several other stations reported totals of over 100 mm (3.9 in). The rains caused flash flooding in the province, which destroyed 6,810 houses, leaving thousands homeless. At Guangzhou Baiyun International Airport, officials delayed or canceled 56 flights because of the storm. Similarly, Shantou Waisha Airport was closed for four hours, which delayed or canceled 10 flights. Heavy damage was reported in three coastal cities. Two small electrical dams were destroyed by the storm, causing additional flooding. Widespread areas lost power or water, and floods damaged or destroyed roads, tunnels, and large areas of crop lands. The storm killed two people by electrocution in Shantou, and a landslide killed 10 people in Wuhua County. Another landslide disrupted rail traffic between the region and Beijing. About 100,000 people had to evacuate their houses in two cities. There were 27 deaths in the province, and damage was estimated at $109 million (¥904 million yuan). After the storm, provincial officials coordinated the rescue effort for missing people. Despite the destruction, the rainfall from Kammuri helped alleviate drought conditions in the province. However, elsewhere in China, the rainfall occurred after months of heavy rainfall had killed 800 people.

Neighboring Fujian Province to Guangdong experienced heavier rainfall, peaking at 315 mm (12.4 in) in Quanzhou. Two stations in the city reported the highest daily total on record. In a six-hour period, a total of 104 mm (4.1 in) was recorded in Pingtan County. Wind gusts reached 79 km/h (49 mph) in Putian, Fujian. The province experienced river flooding due to the heavy rains; the Dazhang Stream crested at 34.62 m (113.6 ft) in Yongtai County, which was above "danger" flood levels. Damage in the province totaled $131 million (¥1.085 billion yuan). There were 19 deaths in Fujian. Significant flooding from Kammuri occurred inland, related to the storm's remnants' merging with a cold front. Rainfall reached 147 mm (5.8 in) at a station in Jiangxi Province. In Hunan Province, the storms destroyed 12,400 houses, leaving over 10,000 people homeless. Also in the province, 14 reservoirs surpassed their capacity. A total of 107 people were killed in Hunan, and damage totaled $322 million (¥2.665 billion yuan).

Across Guangdong, Fujian, and Hunan provinces, floods forced 394,000 people to evacuate, and there were 153 deaths. Overall, 72,000 houses were destroyed and 173,000 sustained damage. In the three provinces, the floods destroyed 60 ha (150 acres) and damaged 292,000 ha (720,000 acres) of crop fields. After the storm, thousands of soldiers in the People's Liberation Army placed sandbags and maintained dykes along Dongting Lake, and, by the end of August, most floods had receded nationwide.

While Kammuri was moving ashore, several ships offshore reported winds of over 74 km/h (40 mph). High rainfall totals spread as far east as Taiwan, where 591 mm (23.3 in) was reported in Taitung County; this was the station's highest daily total. Stations in Okinawa reported rainfall totals as high as 178 mm (7.0 in). The remnants of Kammuri spread across South Korea with rainfall.

== See also ==
- Other tropical cyclones named Kammuri
