= List of storms named Julian =

The name Julian has been used for seven tropical cyclones worldwide: one in the Atlantic Ocean and six in the Western Pacific, assigned by PAGASA in the Philippine Area of Responsibility.

In the Atlantic:

- Tropical Storm Julian (2021) – short-lived tropical storm that formed in the central subtropical Atlantic and remained at sea.

In the Western Pacific:

- Tropical Storm Kompasu (2004) (T0409, 12W, Julian) – a weak tropical cyclone that affected China.
- Severe Tropical Storm Kammuri (2008) (T0809, 10W, Julian) – deadly tropical storm that impacted China and Vietnam.
- Typhoon Bolaven (2012) (T1215, 16W, Julian) – regarded as the most powerful storm to strike the Korean Peninsula in nearly a decade.
- Severe Tropical Storm Aere (2016) (T1619, 22W, Julian) – a long-lived tropical cyclone that hit Central Vietnam.
- Typhoon Maysak (2020) (T2009, 10W, Julian) – a deadly and powerful tropical cyclone that struck the Ryukyu Islands and the Korean Peninsula.
- Typhoon Krathon (2024) (T2418, 20W, Julian) – a powerful tropical cyclone that struck the Philippines and the made landfall in Taiwan

The name Julian was retired following the 2024 Pacific typhoon season and was replaced with Josefa.
