= Typhoon Bolaven (2012) =

Pacific typhoon in 2012

Typhoon Bolaven (Julian)
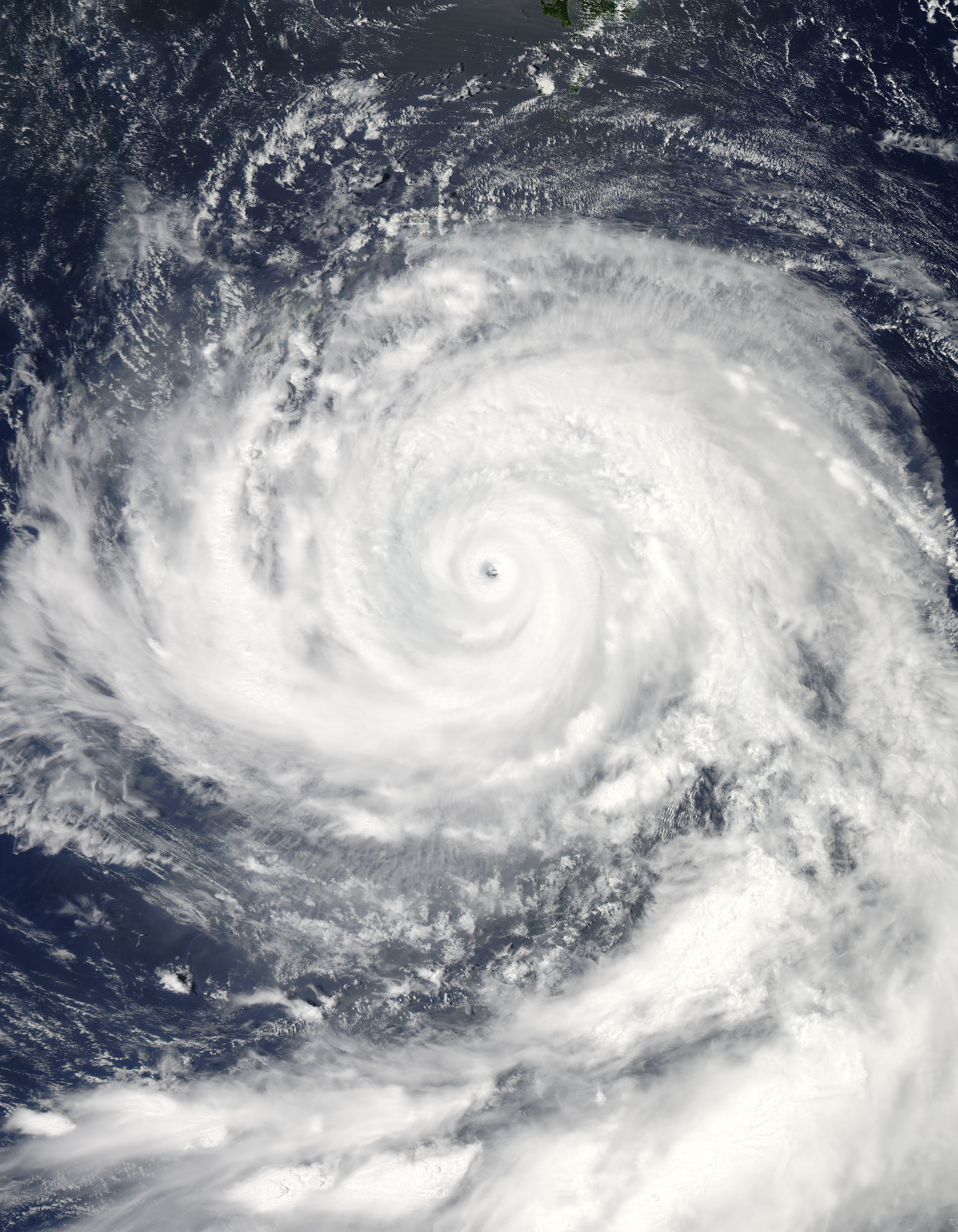
- Bolaven near peak intensity while moving over East China Sea on August 25

Meteorological history
- Formed: August 19, 2012
- Extratropical: August 29, 2012
- Dissipated: September 1, 2012

Very strong typhoon
- 10-minute sustained (JMA)
- Highest winds: 185 km/h (115 mph)
- Lowest pressure: 910 hPa (mbar); 26.87 inHg

Category 4-equivalent typhoon
- 1-minute sustained (SSHWS/JTWC)
- Highest winds: 230 km/h (145 mph)
- Lowest pressure: 929 hPa (mbar); 27.43 inHg

Overall effects
- Fatalities: 96
- Damage: $3.77 billion (2012 USD)
- Areas affected: Ryukyu Islands, Kyushu, Northeastern China, Korean Peninsula, Russian Far East
- IBTrACS
- Part of the 2012 Pacific typhoon season

Typhoon Bolaven, (Note: The name Bolaven (Lao: ບໍລະເວນ, [bɔː˩ la˧ ʋeːn˦˥]) was contributed by Laos and refers to Bolaven Plateau in Lao.) known in the Philippines as Typhoon Julian, was regarded as the most powerful storm to strike the Korean Peninsula in nearly a decade, with wind gusts measured up to 186 km/h (116 mph). Forming as a tropical depression on August 19, 2012, to the southwest of the Mariana Islands, Bolaven steadily intensified as it slowly moved west-northwestward in a region favoring tropical development. The system was soon upgraded to a tropical storm less than a day after formation and further to a typhoon by August 21.

Strengthening became more gradual thereafter as Bolaven grew in size. On August 24, the system attained its peak intensity, with winds of 185 km/h (115 mph) (Note: All winds are in ten-minute sustained standards, as per the Japan Meteorological Agency, unless otherwise stated.) and a barometric pressure of 910 mbar (hPa; 26.87 inHg). Weakening only slightly, the storm passed directly over Okinawa on August 26 as it began accelerating toward the north. Steady weakening continued as Bolaven approached the Korean Peninsula and it eventually made landfall in North Korea late on August 28 before transitioning into an extratropical cyclone. The remnants rapidly tracked northeastward over the Russian Far East before turning eastward and were last noted on September 1 crossing the International Dateline.

Although Bolaven struck the Ryukyu Islands as a powerful typhoon, damage was less than expected. Relatively few buildings were damaged or destroyed across the region. The most significant effects stemmed from heavy rains, amounting to 551.5 mm (21.71 in), that caused flash flooding and landslides. One person drowned on Amami Ōshima after being swept away by a swollen river. In mainland Japan, two people drowned after being swept away by rough seas. In South Korea, 19 people were killed by the storm. Many buildings were damaged and approximately 1.9 million homes were left without power. Losses in the country reached ₩420 billion (US$374.3 million), the majority of which was due to destroyed apple orchards. Significant damage also took place in North Korea, where at least 59 people were killed and 50 others were reported missing. Additionally, 6,700 homes were destroyed. Offshore, nine people drowned after two Chinese vessels sank.

== Meteorological history ==
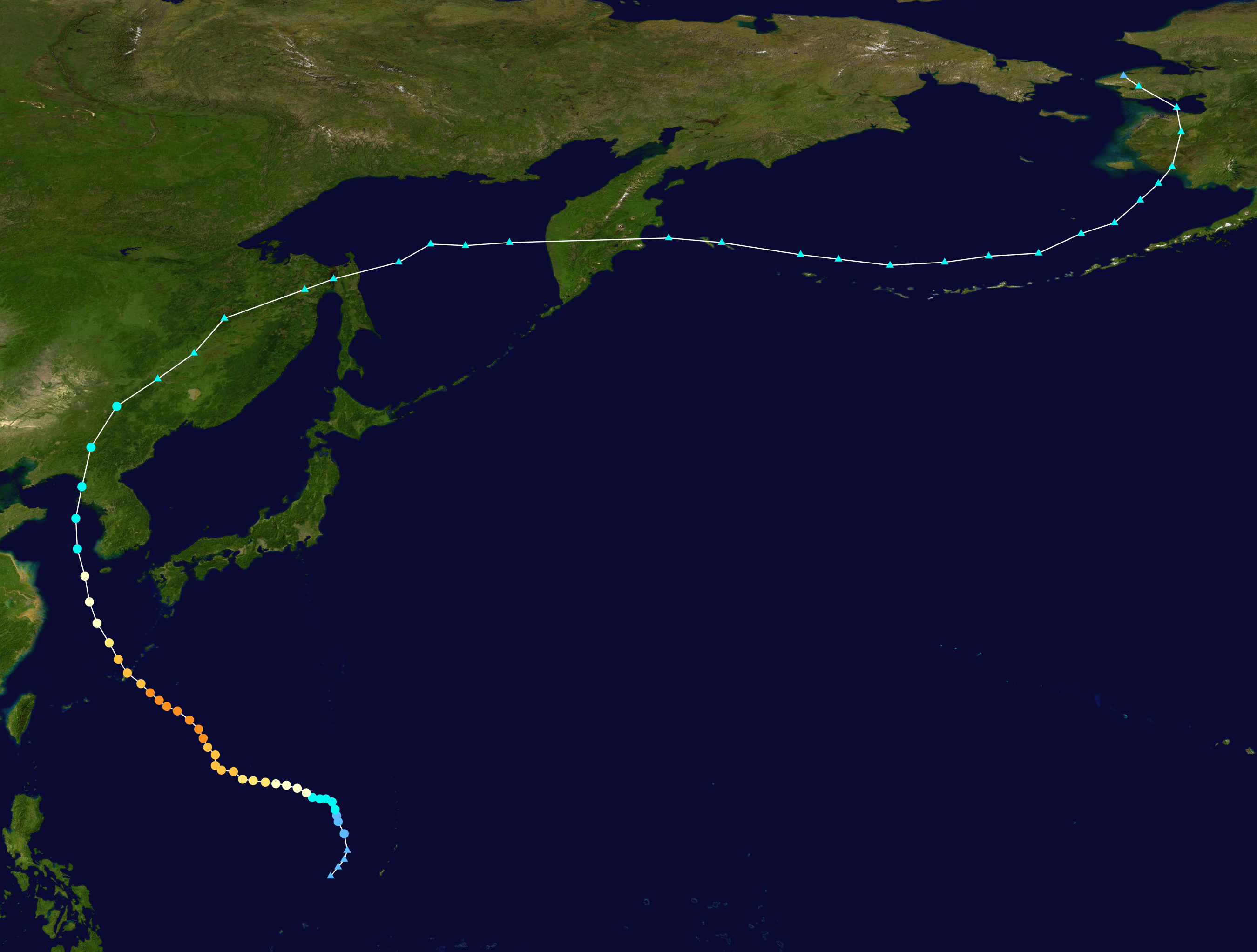
Map plotting the storm's track and intensity, according to the Saffir–Simpson scale Map key Saffir–Simpson scale Tropical depression (≤38 mph, ≤62 km/h) Tropical storm (39–73 mph, 63–118 km/h) Category 1 (74–95 mph, 119–153 km/h) Category 2 (96–110 mph, 154–177 km/h) Category 3 (111–129 mph, 178–208 km/h) Category 4 (130–156 mph, 209–251 km/h) Category 5 (≥157 mph, ≥252 km/h) Unknown Storm type Tropical cyclone Subtropical cyclone Extratropical cyclone, remnant low, tropical disturbance, or monsoon depression

On August 18, an area of showers and thunderstorms associated with a trough formed about 520 km (320 mi) west-southwest of Guam. Over the following day, a low-level circulation developed within the trough. Tracking slowly northeastward into a region of warm sea surface temperatures, low wind shear, and favorable divergence, continued development was anticipated. Later on August 19, the Joint Typhoon Warning Center (JTWC) (Note: The Joint Typhoon Warning Center is a joint United States Navy – United States Air Force task force that issues tropical cyclone warnings for the western Pacific Ocean and other regions.) issued a Tropical Cyclone Formation Alert as the system was anticipated to develop further. Hours later, the Japan Meteorological Agency (JMA) (Note: The Japan Meteorological Agency is the official Regional Specialized Meteorological Center for the western Pacific Ocean.) classified the low as a tropical depression. The JTWC followed suit early on August 20, designating the system as Tropical Depression 16W. Following the development of convective banding features along the southern side of the low, both the JMA and JTWC upgraded the depression to a tropical storm, with the former assigning it the name Bolaven. By this time, the storm began turning northwestward in response to a subtropical ridge south of Japan. Later on August 20, microwave imagery from the Tropical Rainfall Measuring Mission satellite depicted a weak eye-like feature.

Early on August 21, the JMA upgraded Bolaven to a severe tropical storm, with maximum estimated winds at 95 km/h (60 mph). Throughout the day, a large central dense overcast developed around the low-level circulation and banding features became more prominent, especially over the southern half of the storm. However, the northwestern quadrant of Bolaven struggled to organize as quickly due to moderate wind shear produced by a nearby upper-level anticyclone. Due to the improved structure, both the JMA and JTWC upgraded Bolaven to a typhoon during the latter half of August 21. Gradual intensification ensued over the following days as the storm became increasingly organized. A second anticyclone developed over the center of Bolaven later that day and enhanced the cyclone's poleward outflow. Although subsidence and wind shear increased along the northern edge of the storm on August 23, the system's outflow allowed it to mitigate the negative effects ahead of it.

Due to the storm's large size, it began turning towards the north-northwest along the subtropical ridge on August 24, earlier than anticipated. During this brief turn, the center of Bolaven crossed 135°E, entering the area of responsibility of the Philippine Atmospheric, Geophysical and Astronomical Services Administration (PAGASA). As such, the administration assigned the typhoon with the local name Julian. Later that day, a well-defined, 18 km (11 mi) wide eye developed within the central dense overcast and several additional feeder bands formed along the south side of the circulation. Based on the improved structure, the JTWC estimated that the system attained one-minute sustained winds of 215 km/h (135 mph), equivalent to a Category 4 on the Saffir–Simpson Hurricane Scale. By the morning of August 25, Bolaven began to undergo an eyewall replacement cycle. Despite the slightly degrading structure, the JTWC estimated the storm to have intensified slightly, attaining one-minute winds of 230 km/h (145 mph).

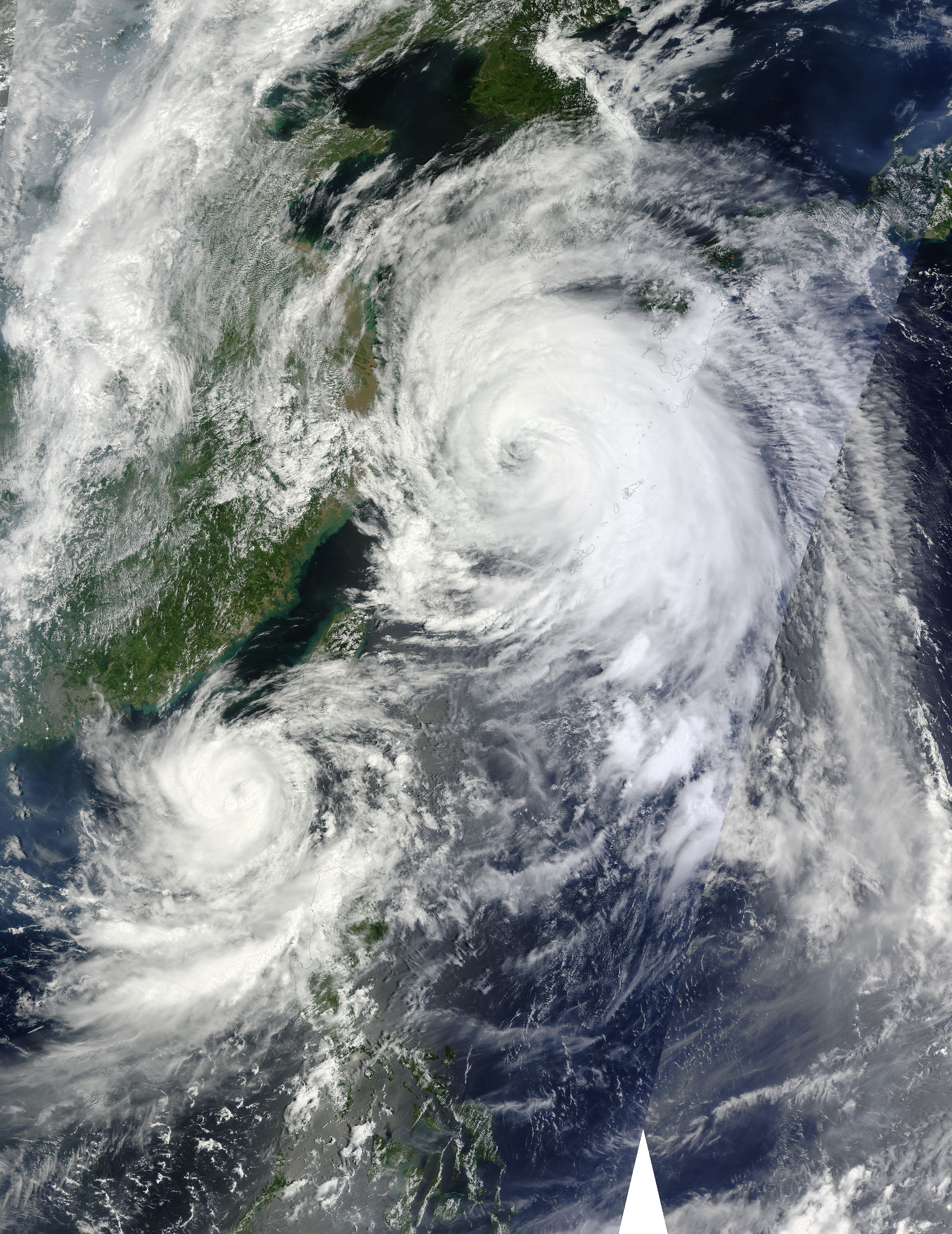
Typhoons Bolaven (top) and Tembin (bottom) undergoing a binary interaction on August 27

On August 25, Bolaven began to interact with Typhoon Tembin, which was located over the South China Sea, causing Tembin to execute a slow counter-clockwise loop. An outer eyewall became more apparent late on August 25, with a clear second ring of deep convection surrounding the original eye. Similar to the JTWC, the JMA continued to indicate that Bolaven was intensifying through early on August 26. At that time, the JMA estimated the typhoon to have reached its peak intensity with winds of 185 km/h (115 mph) and a barometric pressure of 910 mbar (hPa; 26.87 inHg). As the system approached Okinawa, radar imagery showed a 55 km (34 mi) wide eyewall surrounding a small, but well-organized 11 km (6.8 mi) wide inner eyewall. Shortly before 1500 UTC on August 26, the center of Bolaven passed directly over Okinawa. At the time, the JTWC assessed the system to have had one-minute sustained winds of 195 km/h (120 mph) while the JMA estimated the winds to be 175 km/h (110 mph). Early on August 27, the storm's inner eyewall collapsed as the eyewall replacement cycle finished, with the new eye estimated to be about 220 km (140 mi) in diameter. In addition to its unusually large eye, the storm itself was large, spanning approximately 890 to 1,020 km (550 to 630 mi). However, microwave satellite imagery indicated an overall weakening of the western side of the storm. Accelerating northward, Bolaven maintained a well-defined outflow due to a large tropical upper-tropospheric trough to its southeast and a mid-latitude trough to the northwest.

As the storm moved northward over the Yellow Sea, atmospheric conditions became increasingly hostile, with significantly lower sea surface temperatures and high wind shear. During the overnight of August 27–28, the typhoon brushed South Korea as a weakening cyclone. Convection on the west side of the storm diminished and its feeder bands began to collapse. Increasing shear started taking its toll early on August 28 as convection became displaced from the center of circulation, leaving part of the southwestern quadrant exposed. This also indicated that Bolaven had begun to undergo an extratropical transition as it approached the Korean Peninsula. Following structural weakening, the JMA and JTWC downgraded Bolaven to a severe tropical storm and tropical storm, respectively. Hours before moving onshore in North Korea, the majority of the convection had moved over land while the circulation and the center itself had only stratocumulus clouds covering it. Around 1500 UTC on August 28, Bolaven made landfall in North Korea with winds of 100 km/h (60 mph). Rapidly moving towards the northeast, the storm became fully embedded within a baroclinic zone near the China–North Korea border later that day. The JMA continued to monitor Bolaven as a tropical cyclone until early on August 29, at which time the system was situated over the southern region of the Russian Far East. The extratropical remnants later turned eastward and were last noted on September 1 crossing the International Dateline.

== Preparations ==
=== Philippines ===
On August 24, fishing vessels and small craft off the northern and eastern coasts of Luzon, Philippines, were advised to not venture out due to large swells produced by Typhoons Bolaven and Tembin.

=== Ryukyu Islands ===
On August 22, hours before the JTWC classified Bolaven as a typhoon, Okinawa was placed under Tropical Cyclone Condition of Readiness (TCCR) four. The following day, media reports began calling Typhoon Bolaven "the bad one." At this time, the then Category 4-equivalent typhoon was expected to pass directly over Okinawa and based on forecasts from the JTWC, it would be the most powerful storm to hit the island in 13 years. On August 24, the TCCR was raised to level three. During the afternoon of August 25, the TCCR was raised to the third-highest level, one. Residents were urged to have all their preparations complete as soon as possible before the storm arrived. This was further raised to TCCR 1-C (caution) as tropical storm force winds began impacting the island.

Across Ishigaki Island, all public activities were canceled by August 24 and flights to mainland Japan were suspended. Ferry service to Kagoshima Prefecture was also canceled. Throughout Okinawa, 850 people, including 300 in Naha, evacuated to public shelters due to the threat of flooding. Transportation across the island was paralyzed due to the storm as ferry terminals, airports, and bus and rail services were shut down. During the evening of August 25, All Nippon Airways and Japan Airlines canceled all flights to and from the Ryukyu Islands, south of Amami Ōshima, for August 26 and the morning of August 27. The slow motion of the storm led meteorologists at the JMA to warn residents of a potential record rainfall event, stating that localized areas could receive between 400 and 600 mm (16 and 24 in) of rain. Rainfall rates were expected to reach nearly 150 mm (5.9 in) per hour during the height of the storm. Due to the significant threat of flash flooding and mudslides, residents living in flood-prone or mountainous areas were urged to evacuate.

=== China ===
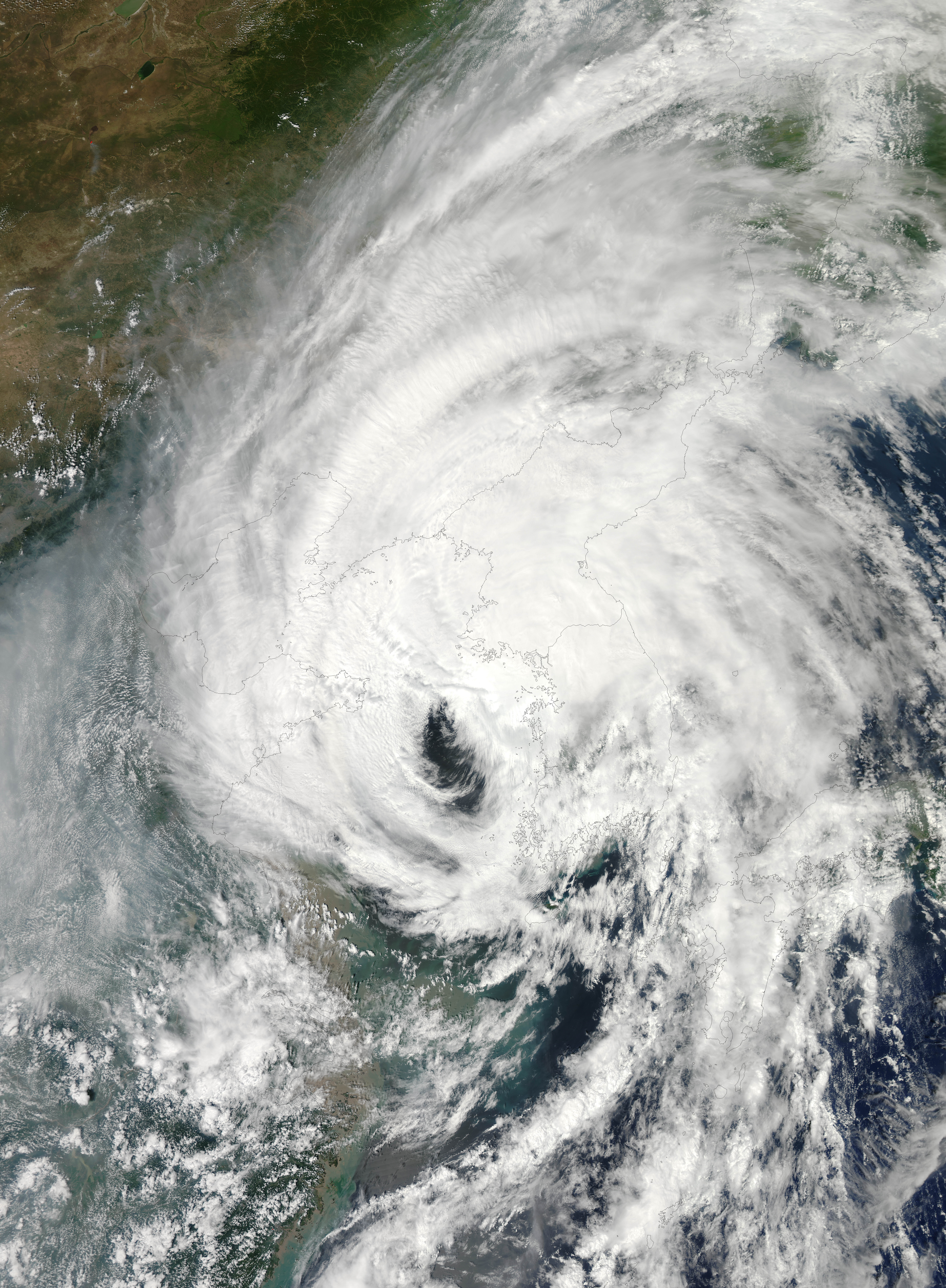
Bolaven transitioning into an extratropical cyclone over the Yellow Sea, nearing landfall on August 28

Although located more than 500 km (310 mi) away from Eastern China, officials in the country issued sea warnings on August 27 due to waves estimated between 9 and 12 m (30 and 39 ft) over the East China Sea and Yellow Sea. In Northeastern China, ferry service along the Yalu River in Dandong City was suspended the same day. Due to the threat of heavy rains, approximately 23,000 were evacuated in Jiangsu Province. In Weihai city, more than 2,000 vessels sought refuge at port and ferry services were canceled. In Shanghai, more than 100 flights were canceled on August 28 due to the storm.

=== Korean Peninsula and Russia ===
Initially, forecasts from the JMA and Korea Meteorological Administration indicated that Bolaven would strike the country at an intensity greater than that of the nation's worst typhoon disaster in decades: Typhoon Rusa in 2002. On August 27, nearly all of South Korea was placed under a typhoon warning as the storm approached. The state disaster relief board went to its highest alert level prior to the storm's arrival. More than 400 flights were canceled across the country, including 109 international flights from Incheon International Airport. The majority of cancelations were domestic flights, mainly from Ningbo to Jeju Island. Local authorities conducted safety inspections of areas prone to landslides and closed off beaches and seawalls. Residents in flood-prone areas were encouraged to evacuate for their own safety, as well. Along the coast, hundreds of ships sought refuge from rough seas in various harbors and ports. Numerous ports banned sea travel and shut down activities by August 27, and 68 of the nation's 87 ferry routes were canceled. In Busan, all ships were not allowed access to the docks until the typhoon's passage.

Storm warnings were issued as far north as the Russian Far East as officials anticipated the remnants of the typhoon to cause significant disruption in the region. Residents were advised to avoid outdoor activities from August 28 to 29 as the storm moved through. In the Sea of Japan, more than 100 ships sought refuge in bays across the Primorsky Krai. Ferry service to all islands in the region was also suspended. All military personnel in the region were placed at an elevated state of readiness for the storm. On August 28, crisis centers were opened in 12 cities and 22 districts across Primorsky Krai. Although the storm was expected to cause significant disruptions in the region, Russian Emergencies Minister Vladimir Puchkov stated that the Asia-Pacific Economic Cooperation Summit in Vladivostok would continue as planned.

== Impact ==
=== Japan ===
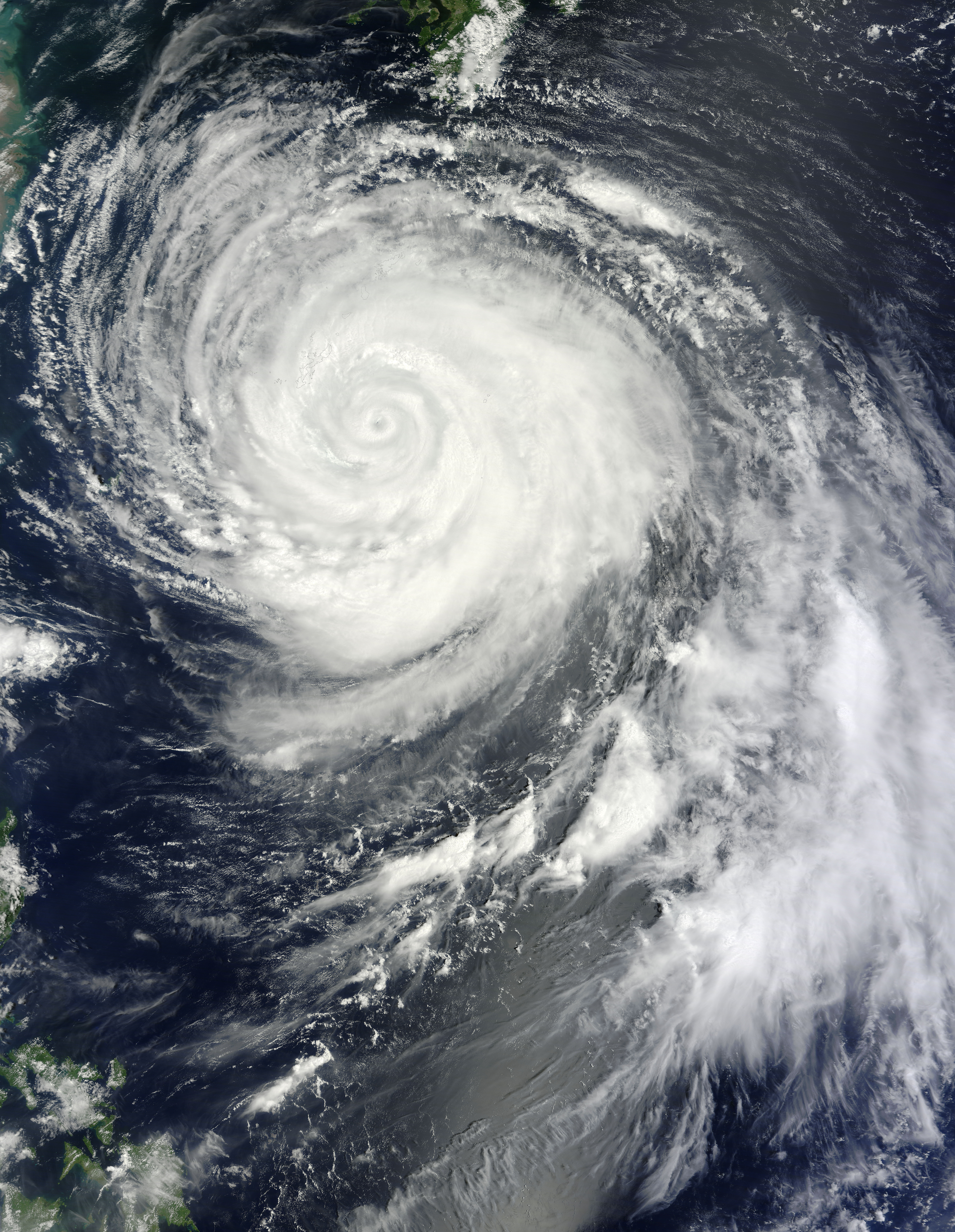
Typhoon Bolaven over the Ryukyu Islands on August 26

Regarded as the most powerful typhoon to strike the region since 1956, strong winds in Japan's Kagoshima Prefecture left approximately 60,000 residences without power. Although a strong storm when it passed over Okinawa, damage was less than initially feared. Across Okinawa, sustained winds were measured up to 167 km/h (104 mph) with gusts to 222 km/h (138 mph). On Okinoerabujima, wind gusts were measured up to 153 km/h (95 mph). At Kadena Air Base, a barometric pressure of 952 mb (hPa; 28.11 inHg) was measured as the storm passed over. Numerous trees were snapped or uprooted and dozens of buildings were damaged by the winds. Throughout the Ryukyu Islands, rainfall peaked in Setouchi, Kagoshima, at 551.5 mm (21.71 in). In Kunigami, 535 mm (21.1 in) of rain fell during the storm. These rains triggered flash flooding across several islands. On Amami Ōshima, one person drowned after being swept away by a swollen river. Numerous landslides took place across the islands, damaging roads and buildings. During the height of the storm, the highest level of warning, TCCR 1-E (emergency), was issued for the island, indicating that all outdoor activities were banned. Numerous roads and bridges were either shut down or blocked by debris across many of the islands, making travel difficult. Damage to public facilities throughout Kagoshima reached JP¥6.3 billion (US$80.1 million).

Due to the threat of landslides, 5,500 households were evacuated across the Amami Islands on August 27. One home was destroyed and 1,065 residences were evacuated in Tokunoshima. Eight people were injured across the island and 549 sought refuge in public shelters. In Yonabaru, the typhoon's storm surge and large swells flooded coastal highways and inundated nearby buildings. Large sections of roads were also washed away by the storm. Cellphone service was lost late on August 26 throughout much of Okinawa Prefecture.

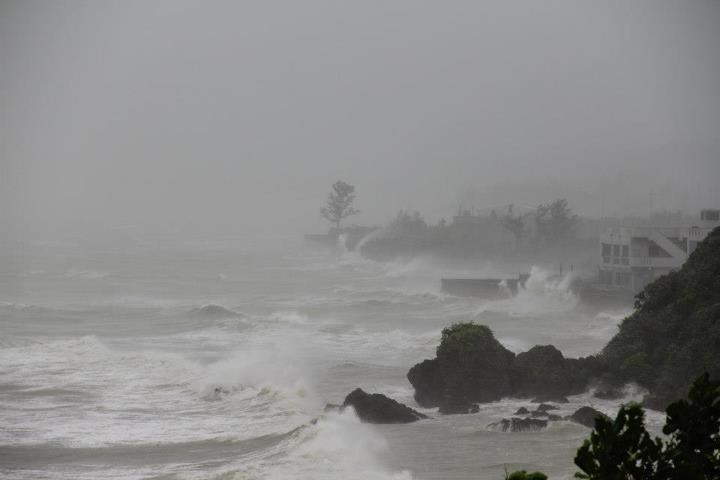
Large sea waves from Bolaven hitting Okinawa Island

Passing over Okinawa with a central pressure of 910 mbar (hPa; 26.87 inHg), Bolaven became one of the most intense typhoons to ever strike the region. Off the coast of Wakayama Prefecture, swells from the typhoon battered fishing vessels and knocked the captain of one ship overboard. Although a rescue helicopter was quick to reach him, he was later pronounced dead at a local hospital. Just off the coast of Jogashima Misaki-cho in Miura, Kanagawa, two boys were swept away by large swells. A mother attempted to swim after them to save them but later drowned. The two boys were later rescued with minor injuries by the Coast Guard. Although the storm did not strike the Japanese mainland, its outer bands brought showers and thunderstorms to parts of Kyushu. Due to the rains, rail service in Saga Prefecture was temporarily suspended, affecting 4,200 passengers. In Isahaya, one person was injured after being struck by a billboard downed by high winds. Throughout Japan, losses to agriculture and fisheries amounted to JP¥423 million (US$5.38 million).

=== South Korea ===
The first area in South Korea impacted by Typhoon Bolaven was Jeju Island, a small island located off the southwestern coast of the nation. There, high winds from the storm downed power poles, broke street lamps, and damaged buildings. More than 70,000 households on the island lost power. On Jeollanam-do Wando, a wind gust of 186 km/h (116 mph) was recorded during the storm's passage. Across the country, approximately 1.9 million people lost power, though it was quickly restored to all but 34,000 within a day. In Seoul, strong winds damaged street lamps, church spires, and downed signs. Due to various storm-related incidents, hundreds of people had to be evacuated. Throughout the country, at least 19 people were killed by Typhoon Bolaven. Reports indicated that there was extensive property damage from the storm. Many buildings lost their roofs, several collapsed, and smaller structures were blown over. In Gwangju, a record 10,004 emergency calls were made in one day in relation to the storm, the majority of which were about fallen billboards.

In Naju, the country's largest producer of pears, approximately 1,400 hectares (3,460 acres) of pear trees, or 60% of the total crop, was destroyed. Agriculture as a whole suffered significantly from the storm, with a total of 9,000 hectares (22,000 acres) of apple and pear plantations being destroyed. As a result, the price of produce across the nation jumped substantially. In Yesan alone, a town where more than 1,500 families rely on their apple orchards for a living, losses to the orchards reached ₩300 billion (US$264 million). The prices of spinach, cabbage, and lettuce rose by 124%, 72%, and 26%, respectively, in just one day. Total damage throughout the country, along with Typhoon Tembin, were calculated at ₩636.5 billion (US$567.2 million). More than 500 people were left homeless as a result of Bolaven, mostly in South Jeolla Province. Additionally, economic losses to airlines related to the typhoon reached ₩17 billion (US$15 million). Korean Air and Asiana Airlines suffered the greatest losses of the affected companies.

About 2 km (1.2 mi) off the coast of Jeju Island, two Chinese vessels with a total of 33 people aboard, sank during the storm on August 28. According to local media, 18 of the crewmen were rescued or swam back to shore while 9 drowned and 6 others remained missing. Off the coast of South Gyeongsang Province, a 77,458 ton cargo ship ran aground during the storm and broke in half. Eighteen people were on board the vessel, though no one was injured during the incident.

=== North Korea ===
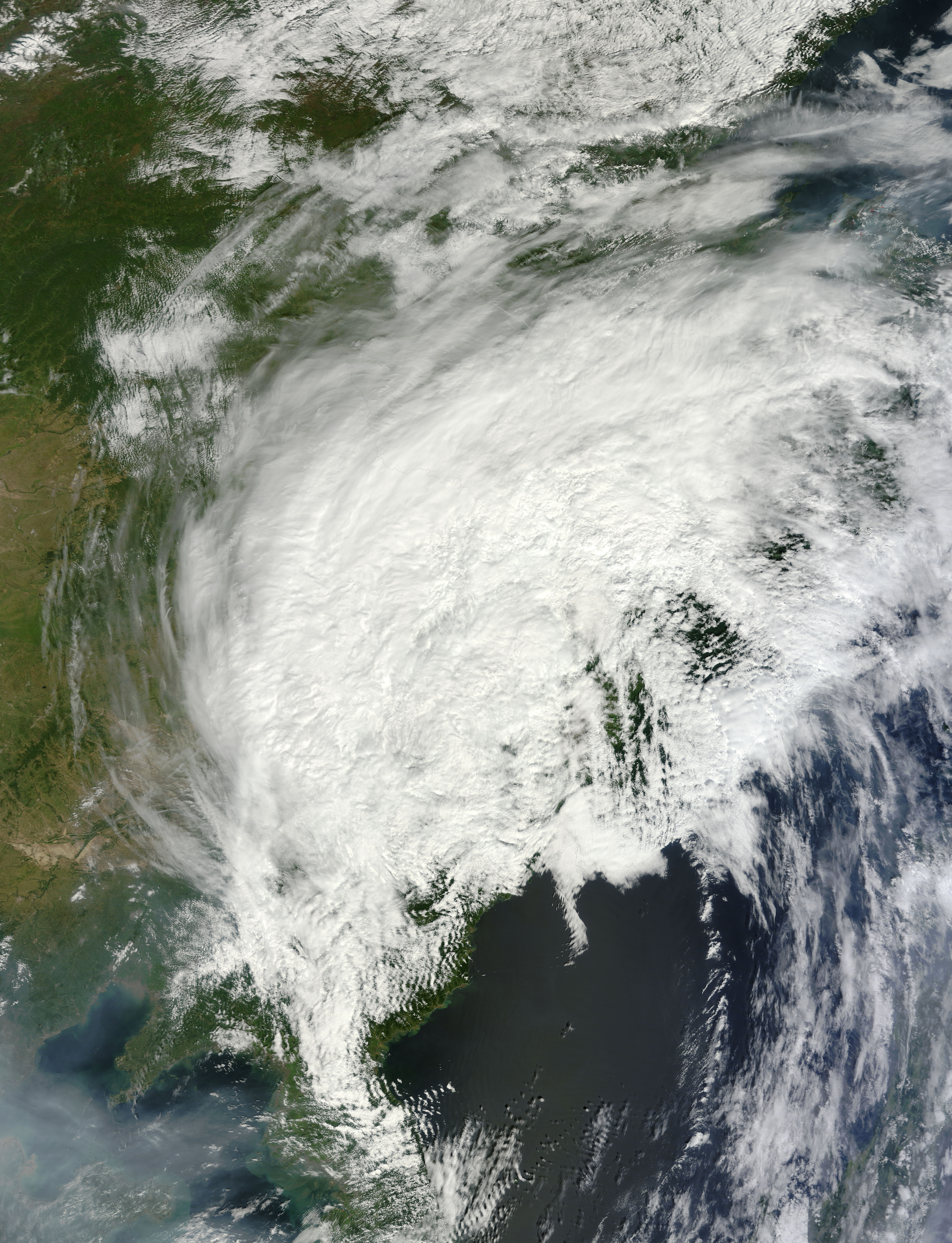
The extratropical remnants of Typhoon Bolaven over northeastern China and the Russian Far East on August 29

In North Korea, heavy rains from the storm triggered significant flooding and many landslides. The Korean Central News Agency reported wind speeds of more than 108 km/h (67 mph) in North Hwanghae, South Hwanghae, South Hamgyong, South Pyongan Provinces, and the city of Nampho, and waves as high as 1.11 m (3.6 ft) in the sea of Kimchaek. According to the North Korean Hydrometeorological Management Office, wind gusts reached 130 km/h (81 mph). Widespread damage took place throughout the country as a result of the storm. The hardest hit area was South Hamgyong Province, where 48 people were killed and another 45 were reported missing. Across the province, 2,405 homes were destroyed and another 1,500 were damaged. In South Phyongan Province, eight people were killed and 714 homes were destroyed. Two people were killed in North Hamgyong Province and another died in Ryanggang Province. At least 8,950 homes were destroyed and approximately 101,000 hectares (250,000 acres) of crop and rice fields were flooded. More than a dozen schools and medical buildings were destroyed. Additionally, 16,730 trees were downed and 880 public and industrial buildings were severely damaged. In all, 59 people were killed, 50 others were reported missing, and more than 21,800 others were left homeless.

=== China and Russia ===
Northeastern China did not experience the full-force of Typhoon Bolaven, though heavy rains did impact the country. Changchun recorded the heaviest rains in China related to Bolaven, with 120.6 mm (4.75 in) falling. In the city alone, 25 roads were flooded and 20 power poles were downed. Thousands of people were evacuated due to flooding triggered by the storm. Gale-force winds in Jilin Province damaged approximately 690,000 hectares (1.7 million acres) of crops. Rainfall amounting to 139 mm (5.5 in) caused localized flooding, disrupting transportation in Heilongjiang Province. Throughout Northeastern China, an estimated 40 million people were affected by the typhoon. Total economic losses in China were counted to be CN¥19.82 billion (US$3.12 billion).

On August 29, the remnants of Bolaven brought winds up to 90 km/h (56 mph) in the Primorsky Krai, leaving 9,800 people without power. Power was soon restored to all, except for 195 residents in the town of Vityaz. In Vladivostok, wind gusts reached 118 km/h (73 mph), downing numerous trees. Rains associated with the storm were light, with only 5 mm (0.20 in) recorded in Vladivostok. Gale-force winds prompted the temporary closure of the Bridge to Russky Island, which was built specifically for the Asia-Pacific Economic Cooperation Summit. With ferries already canceled, residents were unable to leave the island until the storm passed. In the Khabarovsk Krai, heavy rains from the storm proved beneficial as they allowed firefighters to extinguish six wildfires and contain five others within a 24‑hour span. Along the coast, large waves caused some beach erosion and prompted evacuations in Manchzhurka. Additionally, five people had to be rescued after ignoring warnings and wading into the sea. In some areas, large numbers of crabs, fish, and oysters washed ashore during the storm.

== Aftermath ==
=== South Korea ===
By September 6, farmers in the southern areas of the country requested aid from the government. In South Jeolla Province, ₩35 billion (US$30.8 million) was allocated for post-storm recovery. Of this, about half went to repairing public facilities. Across the province, repairs were expected to be completed by October or November 2012. On September 11, the Food, Agriculture, Forestry and Fisheries Minister announced that residents severely affected by the typhoon were eligible for up to ₩50 million (US$44,000) in construction assistance. Economically, Typhoons Bolaven and Tembin contributed to a 6.6% decrease in construction investment, the largest drop since January 2003.

=== North Korea ===
On September 4, Hwang Woo-yea, chairman of South Korea's Saenuri Party, urged the government to seek international aid, namely in the form of food, for North Korean residents affected by the typhoon. On September 6, the Red Cross Society of Democratic People's Republic of Korea announced that international aid may be requested for the effects of severe flooding in July and Typhoon Bolaven. Locally, the Red Cross distributed 2,515 emergency kits to more than 11,600 people in three of the hardest-hit provinces. During the first week of September, the government of North Korea requested aid from South Korea and later accepted their offer of 10,000 tons of flour, and 3 million packages of instant noodles, medical supplies, and other aid. Additionally, the United Nations World Food Program called for emergency assistance for the country. However, despite initially agreeing to terms with South Korea, North Korea rejected the aid offer, stating that "they don't need such aid."

== See also ==
- Other tropical cyclones named Bolaven
- Other tropical cyclones named Julian
- Typhoon Kompasu (2010)
- Typhoon Rusa
- Typhoon Muifa (2011)
- Typhoon Hinnamnor
- Typhoon Khanun (2023)
