= Typhoon Tembin (2012) =

Pacific typhoon in 2012

Typhoon Tembin (Igme)
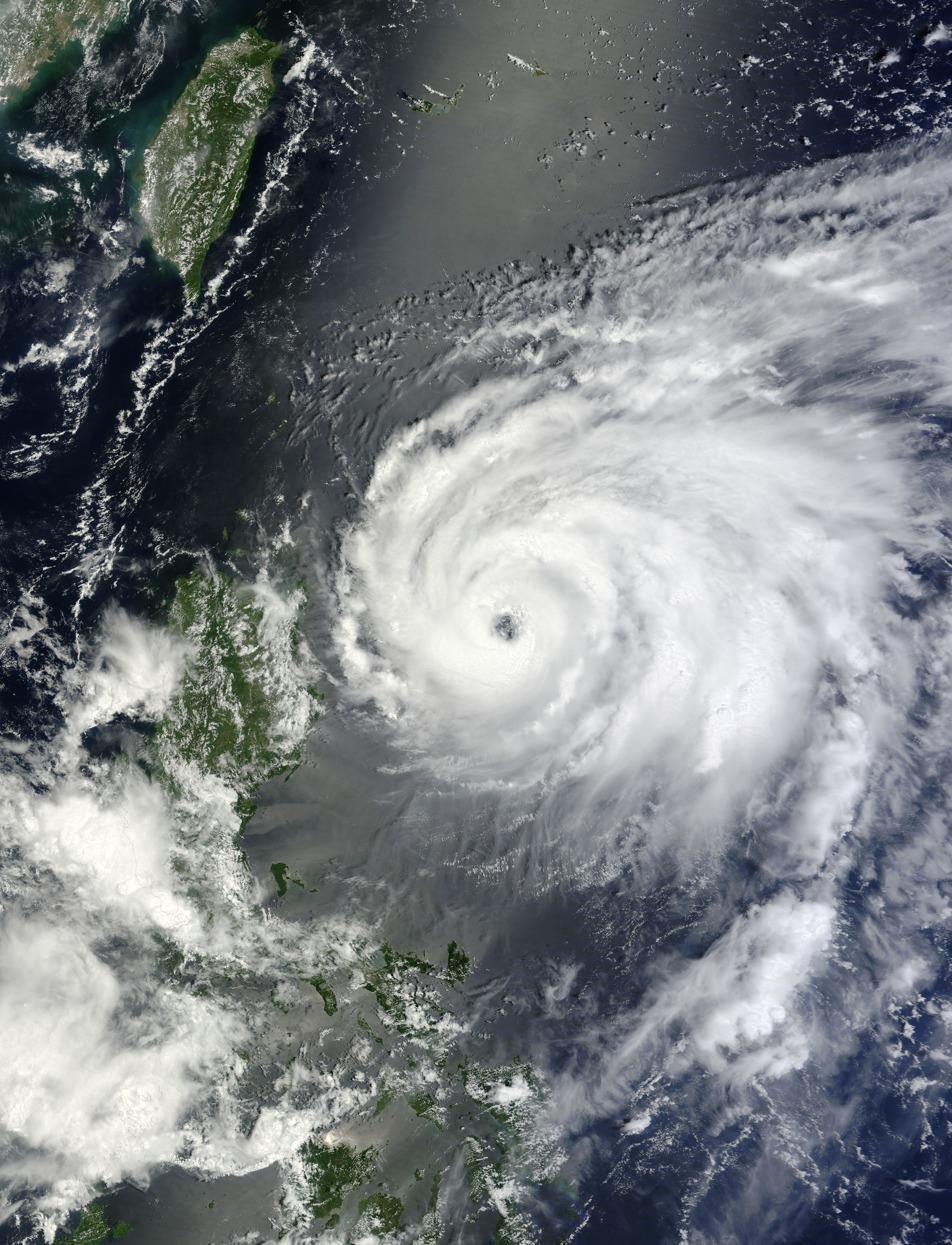
- Typhoon Tembin shortly before peak intensity on August 20, 2012.

Meteorological history
- Formed: August 17, 2012
- Extratropical: August 30, 2012
- Dissipated: September 1, 2012

Typhoon
- 10-minute sustained (JMA)
- Highest winds: 150 km/h (90 mph)
- Lowest pressure: 950 hPa (mbar); 28.05 inHg

Category 4-equivalent typhoon
- 1-minute sustained (SSHWS/JTWC)
- Highest winds: 220 km/h (140 mph)
- Lowest pressure: 933 hPa (mbar); 27.55 inHg

Overall effects
- Fatalities: 10 total
- Damage: $6.67 million (2012 USD)
- Areas affected: Philippines, Taiwan, China, Japan, South Korea
- IBTrACS
- Part of the 2012 Pacific typhoon season

Typhoon Tembin, known in the Philippines as Typhoon Igme, was an intense and erratic tropical cyclone in the Western Pacific Ocean that had an unusual trajectory, approaching Taiwan twice. Tembin, which means balancing scale or Libra in Japanese, was the eighth typhoon and the fourteenth named storm of the 2012 Pacific typhoon season. After making landfall over the southern tip of Taiwan late on August 23, Tembin weakened but regained strength in the South China Sea, looping before making a second landfall on southern Taiwan as a tropical storm on August 27; however, the system did not restrengthen in the East China Sea, and made landfall over South Korea on August 30 before becoming extratropical.

== Meteorological history ==
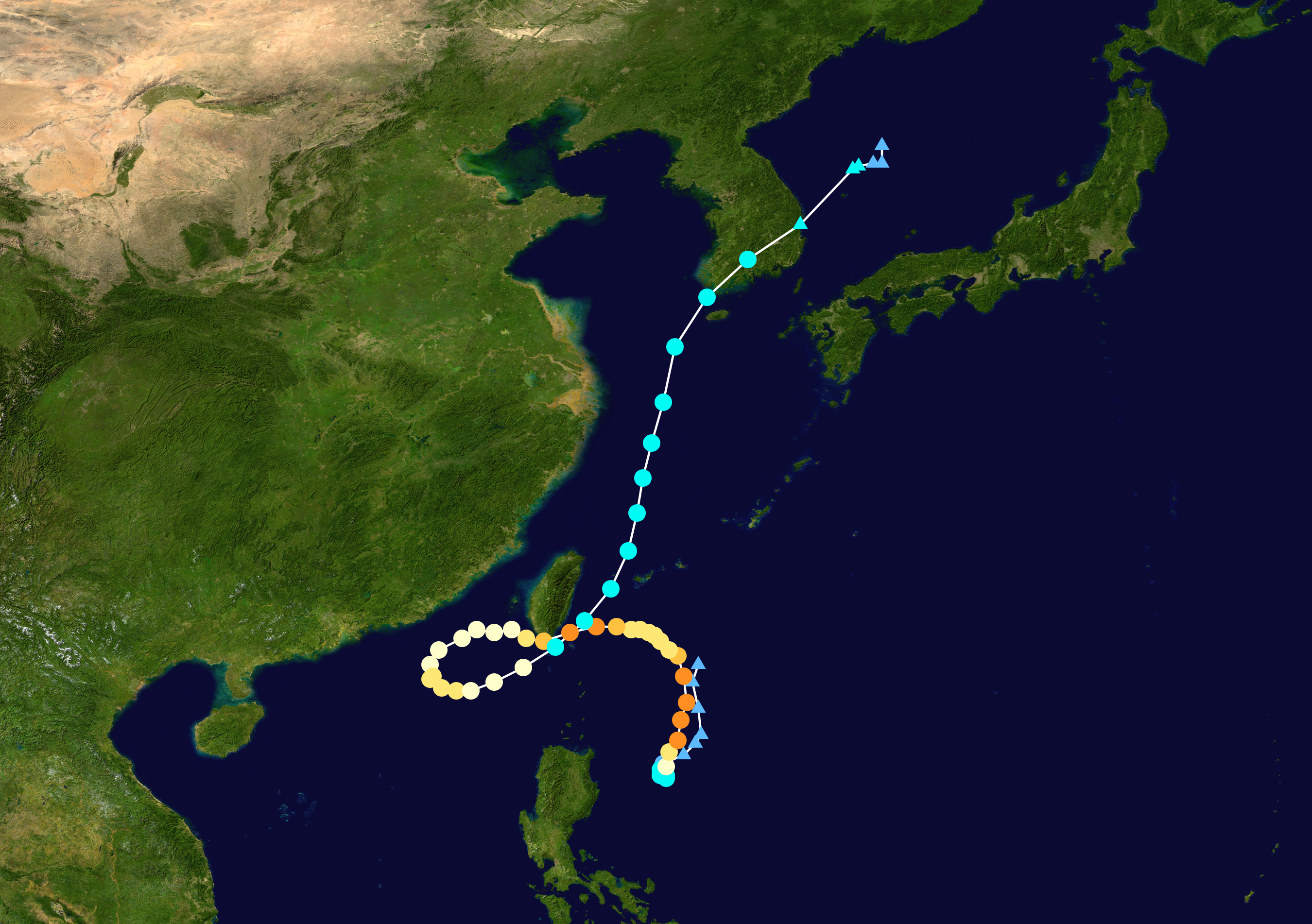
Map plotting the storm's track and intensity, according to the Saffir–Simpson scale Map key Saffir–Simpson scale Tropical depression (≤38 mph, ≤62 km/h) Tropical storm (39–73 mph, 63–118 km/h) Category 1 (74–95 mph, 119–153 km/h) Category 2 (96–110 mph, 154–177 km/h) Category 3 (111–129 mph, 178–208 km/h) Category 4 (130–156 mph, 209–251 km/h) Category 5 (≥157 mph, ≥252 km/h) Unknown Storm type Tropical cyclone Subtropical cyclone Extratropical cyclone, remnant low, tropical disturbance, or monsoon depression

=== Genesis ===
On August 16, a tropical disturbance formed southeast of Taiwan. On August 17, the Japan Meteorological Agency (JMA) mentioned it as a tropical depression, as a subtropical ridge pushed the system southwards. The Joint Typhoon Warning Center (JTWC) issued a Tropical Cyclone Formation Alert on the system late on August 18; early the next day, the JMA upgraded it to a tropical storm and named it Tembin, (Note: The name Tembin (Japanese: テンビン, [tẽ̞mbʲĩn]) was contributed by Japan and refers to the constellation Libra, the balancing scale, in Japanese.) and the JTWC upgraded it to a tropical depression. Soon, the Philippine Atmospheric, Geophysical and Astronomical Services Administration (PAGASA) also upgraded it to a tropical depression and named it Igme. On August 20, Tembin entered a period of explosive intensification, on encountering warm and deep Oceanic heat content. The JMA first noted this, and immediately upgraded Tembin into a Typhoon. Only 3 hours later, the JTWC pointed out that an eye of radius 20 nautical miles (37 km; 23 mi) has formed under the low-level circulation center (LLCC) and is being powered by a self-induced meso-anticyclone. Also, there was an excellent poleward and equatorward outflow. A building western extension of a ridge close to the equator started showing a steering effect on the system, at that time. Tembin was expected to reach peak intensity within 48 hours. Later that morning, Tembin contained tracking north-northeastward at 04 knots (7.4 km/h; 4.6 mph) while its eye grew a little large and its eyewall became more consolidated. The cloud-tops further cooled down and the eyewall was nearly symmetric. The poleward outflow was enhanced by a strong tropical upper tropospheric trough (TUTT). The windspeed rose from 65 knots (120 km/h; 75 mph) to 95 knots (176 km/h; 109 mph) within 6 hours. A deep mid-latitude trough across the Korean region resulting in a temporary slow-down or perhaps quasi-stationary motion east of Taiwan. At the same time, the PAGASA updated Tembin, otherwise known as Igme, locally, to a typhoon.

=== Peak intensity ===
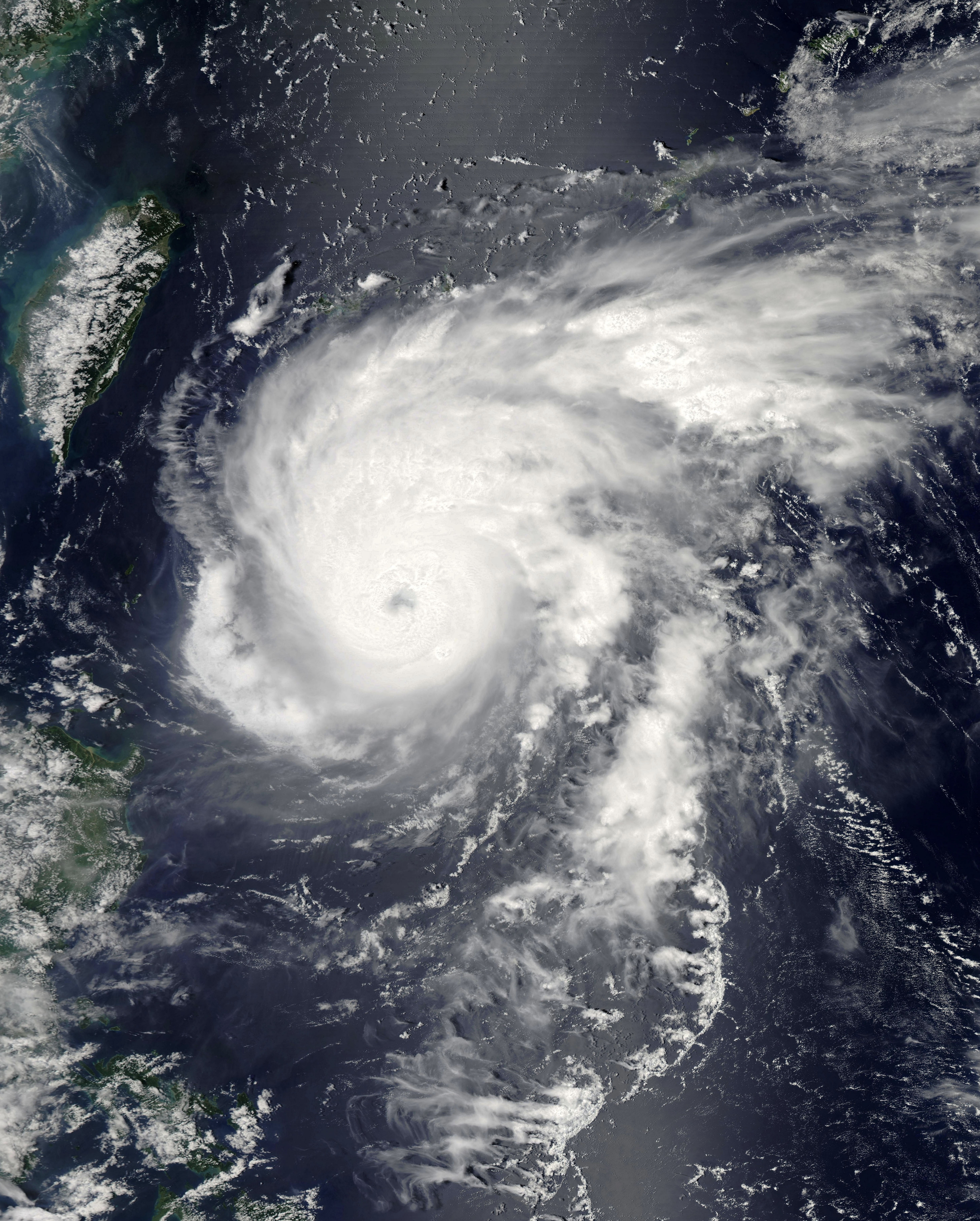
Typhoon Tembin shortly after peak intensity on August 21

On August 20, by Tembin rapidly intensified, and its peak nearly on peak. By August 21, Tembin reached a maximum 1-minute sustained windspeed of 115 knots (213 km/h; 132 mph). The system maintained deep convective banding, tightly wrapped into a well-defined, small 10 nautical miles (19 km; 12 mi) eye surrounded by a highly symmetric eyewall. A nearby ridge started steering Tembin west. The JTWC were then anticipating a peak intensity of 130 knots (240 km/h; 150 mph). Thereafter, the TUTT cell over the system started weakening it. The eyewall started getting eroded. The JTWC no longer expected Tembin to strengthen. By that afternoon, it became clear that the weakening was the result of increased upper-level convergence caused by a rapidly strengthening TUTT extending southwestward from a TUTT cell. At that time, Tembin was tracking north-northwestward at 08 knots (15 km/h; 9.2 mph) and was located approximately 280 nautical miles (520 km; 320 mi) southeast of Taipei, Taiwan. A deep mid-latitude shortwave trough was tracking northeastward across eastern China. It was expected to track north of the system and then track into the Sea of Japan and steer Tembin westward.

Later that night, Tembin slowed down on its track. Located approximately 255 nautical miles (472 km; 293 mi) southeast of Taipei, the system tracked north-northwestward at 05 knots (9.3 km/h; 5.8 mph) during the past six hours. Animated enhanced infrared satellite imagery showed that the system maintained overall tight consolidation and symmetry even as poleward outflow had slightly diminished. Upper level analysis indicated that Tembin sustained a mesoscale anticyclone that continues to provide good outflow despite two TUTT cells, one to the north and one to the southwest of the typhoon causing subsidence and strong shear along the west to southwestern flank. On the morning on August 22, Animated multispectral satellite imagery showed that the central convection has slightly warmed as the overall structure became more elongated, an indication of increased shear. The system was tracking along the southwestern periphery of a deep-layered subtropical ridge to its north.

=== Gradual weakening and re-intensification ===
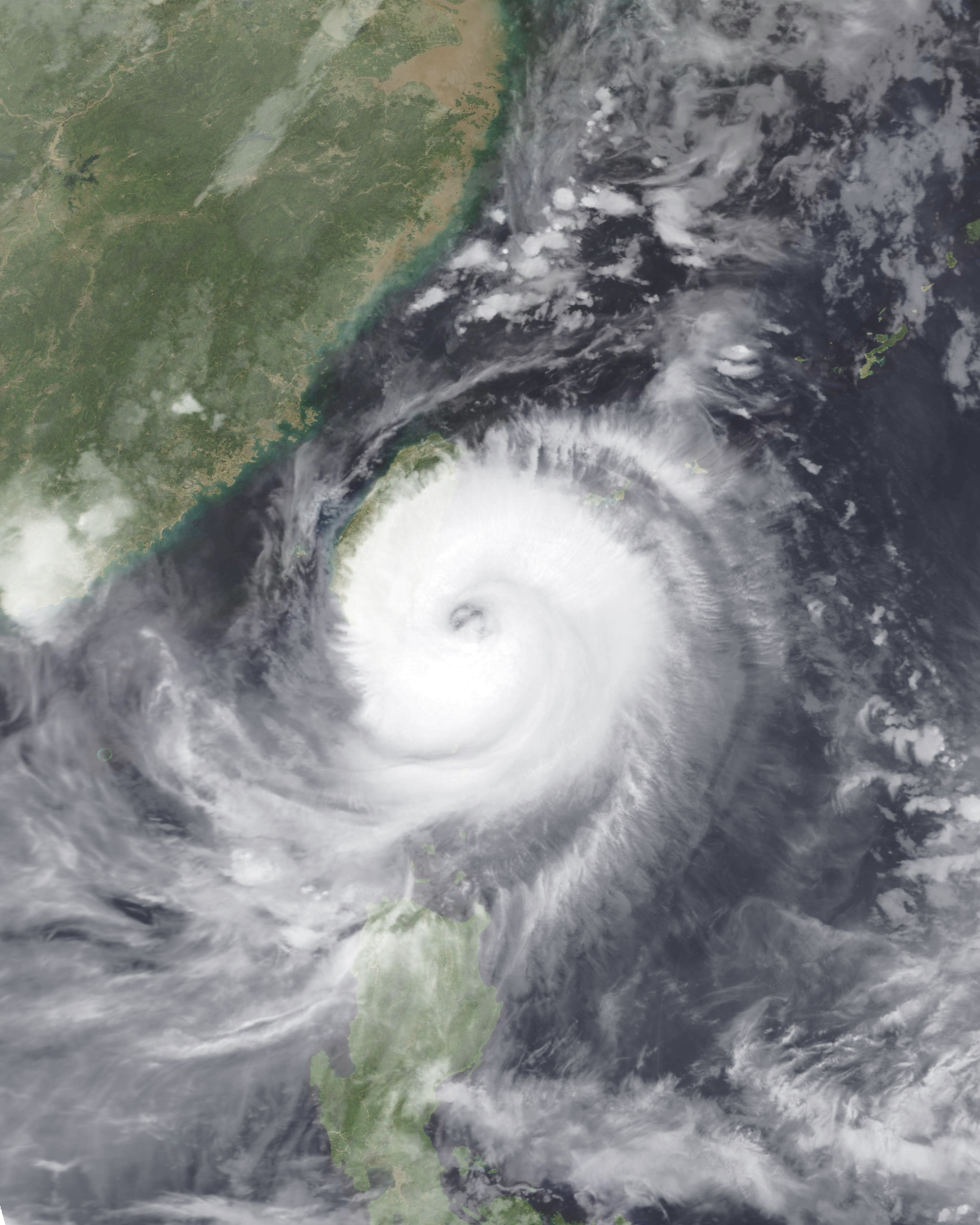
Typhoon Tembin at its secondary peak intensity while approaching Taiwan on August 22

Soon, it became clear that the typhoon started to undergo an eyewall replacement cycle. Satellite imagery showed a new eye-like feature developing within the system. Tembin continued weakening due to the eyewall replacement cycle and was expected to weaken even further at that moment. Tembin continued to slow down on its track and remained almost stationary. Located approximately 210 nautical miles (390 km; 240 mi) southeast of Taipei, the storm system became a little less organized over the past couple of hours. Poleward outflow also started diminishing, as a result. Track speeds continued to be slow as a primary steering influence, a deep layered subtropical ridge to the storm's north, was being weakened by a transiting mid-latitude trough located over the Korean Peninsula. Upper-level analysis indicated that the poleward outflow towards the tropical upper-tropospheric trough cell that was located over southern honshu shut down.

Early on August 23, Tembin slowed down even further, to under 02 knots (3.7 km/h; 2.3 mph) towards the west. Microwave image revealed a nearly uniform concentric deep eyewall structure that was slightly fragmented over the southwestern quadrant. Finally, a couple of hours later, Tembin started picking up track speed. A mesoscale anticyclone over the system generated excellent radial outflow. Later that afternoon, Tembin re-intensified into a strong category 3 equivalent on the SSHS with winds of up to 105 knots (194 km/h; 121 mph) on the 1-minute sustained average. The dual banding features along the northern and southern halves continued feeding the low level circulation center. Upper level analysis indicated that the dual channel outflow to the poleward and equatorward directions had been instrumental in the system maintaining its intensity.

=== First landfall, and re-intensification in the South China Sea ===
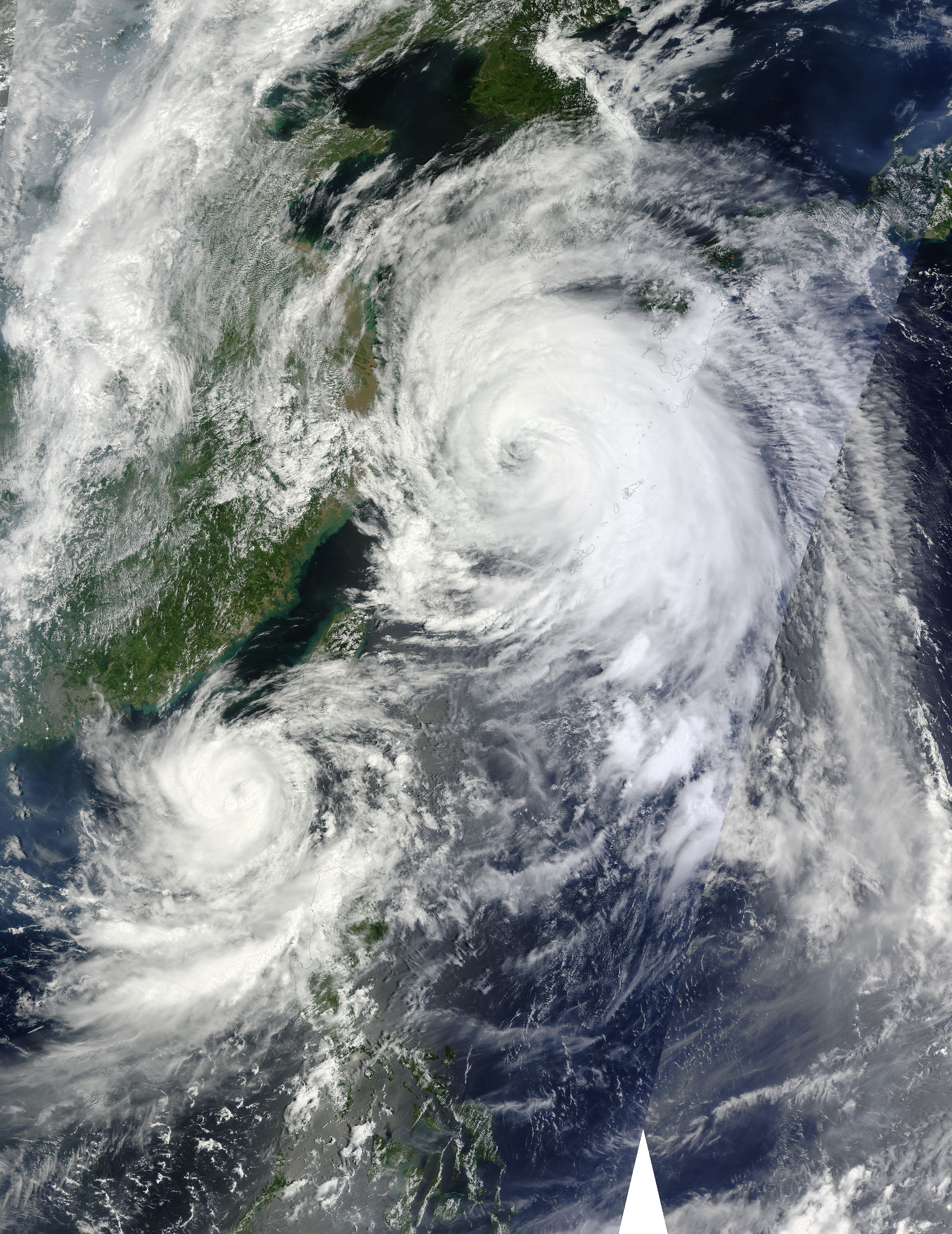
Typhoons Bolaven (top) and Tembin (bottom) undergoing a binary interaction on August 27

At 19:00 UTC on August 23, Typhoon Tembin made landfall over Mudan Township in Pingtung, Taiwan, and it arrived the Taiwan Strait two hours later. Early on August 24, the JTWC said that the eyewall structure had only slightly degraded as Tembin moved inland. Located approximately 180 nautical miles (330 km; 210 mi) south-southwest of Taipei, the storm system was drifting west-southwestward at nearly 10 knots (19 km/h; 12 mph). At that time, Tembin was expected to accelerate east-northeastward and interact with another nearby typhoon, Bolaven and go around Taiwan in loops. Later that morning, animated multispectral satellite imagery depicted that the structure of the low level circulation center suffered a significant inflow issue as winds along the southeastern quadrant tracked over southern Taiwan. The JTWC declared that Tembin weakened into a strong Tropical Storm from a Typhoon as winds dropped to under 60 knots (110 km/h; 69 mph), although the Hong Kong Observatory kept it at typhoon status. An Advanced Scatterometer (ASCAT) pass revealed that winds along the western half of the system were in the 35 to 40 knot range, with a band of winds in the luzon strait showing 30 knots.

Later that day, animated enhanced infrared satellite imagery depicted that the organization has been able to consolidate with convection beginning to wrap into the LLCC, as the LLCC was moving away from land. While tracking west-southwestward at nearly 07 knots (13 km/h; 8.1 mph), convection started to wrap anew into the LLCC. A microwave eye feature was also observed. Upper level analysis indicated a weak point source anticyclone that continued providing good outflow and low vertical wind shear environment. After developing an eye, Tembin rapidly intensified into a category 3 typhoon, before gradually weakening due to an easterly wind shear from Bolaven, which caused the LLCC to become slightly exposed, associated with a few burst of convection, and made its closest approach to Taiwan on 17:30(UTC) as a tropical storm.

=== Second landfall and demise ===
Early on August 28, Tembin entered the East China Sea, after making a circle back toward Taiwan as a tropical storm. By August 28, due to land interaction and wind shear from the northeast by a ridge, Tembin's exposed low level circulation center become partially exposed, with deep convection burst on the southern portions of the LLCC.

By August 29, Tembin was charging towards South Korea. At 01:30 UTC on August 30, Tembin made landfall over Boseong County, South Jeolla Province, South Korea as a tropical storm.

== Preparations and impact ==
=== Philippines ===
Tembin brought flash flooding to Luzon, killing 8 people and 3 others went missing. Agricultural damage amounted to be PHP4.09 million (US$96,000).

=== Taiwan ===
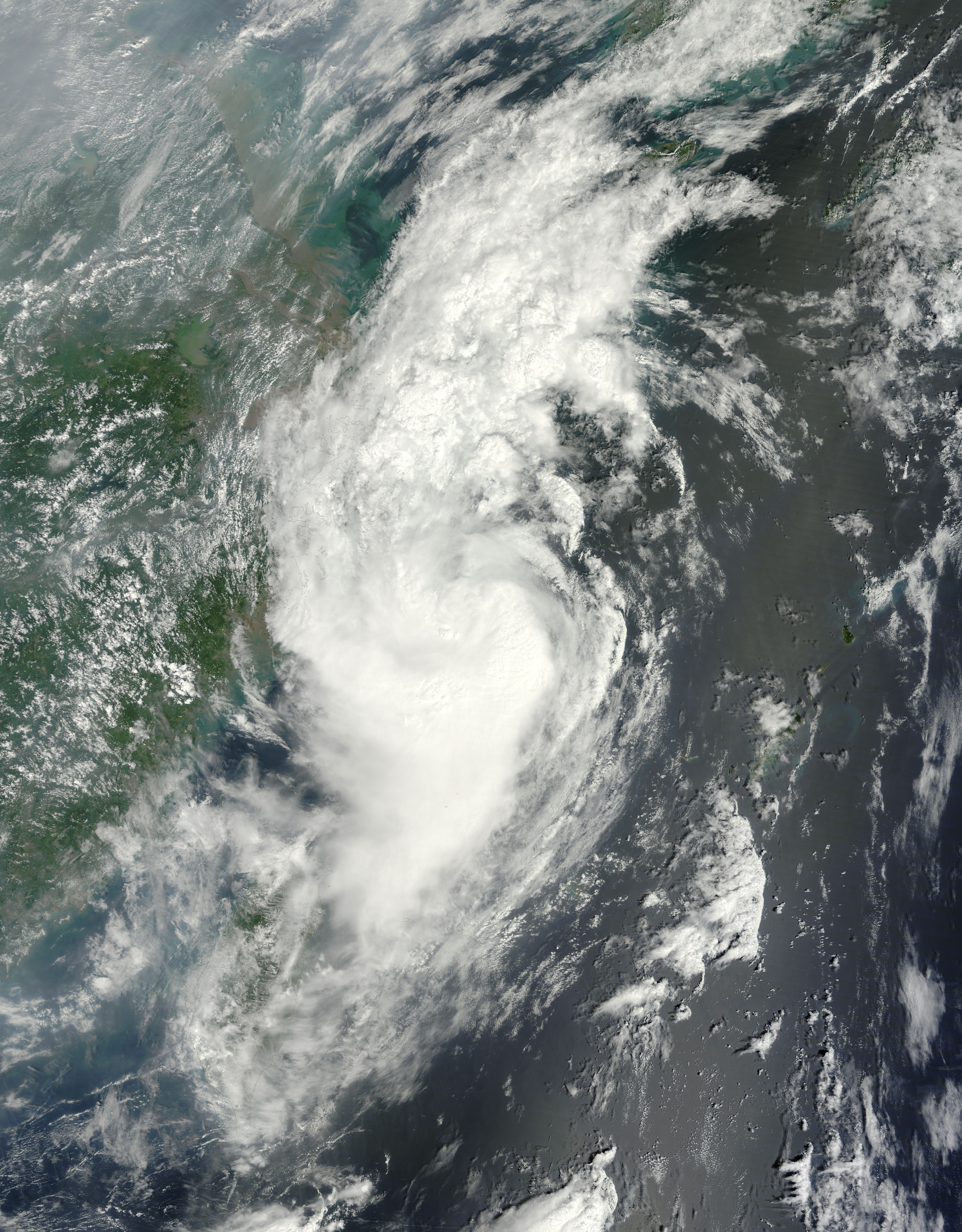
Tropical Storm Tembin approaching the Korean Peninsula August 29

On August 21, the Central Weather Bureau in Taiwan issued a sea warning for Typhoon Tembin, predicting strong winds, heavy rains and storm surge. The residents of Yilan, Hualien, and Taitung were asked to stay alert regarding the storm system. By August 22, the Ministry of National Defense of Taiwan helped evacuate several residents in the typhoon-prone areas and provided accommodation to some in their own military camps. More than 49,000 soldiers were on standby to provide relief and rescue to those in need when the typhoon strikes. About 107 military bases in and around the typhoon-prone regions were ready to provide shelter to well over 53,000 evacuees. The next day, Taiwanese authorities evacuated another 3000 residents from mountainous areas anticipating torrential rain that could cause landslides. Later that day, the outer rainbands of Tembin started brushing Taiwan. The system unexpected sped up towards land and started re-intensifying. Late that night numerous cities and counties across the island shut down schools and offices for up to two days. Farmers also immediately harvested their crops like they earlier did in 2010 anticipating Fanapi's arrival. People in eastern Taiwan boarded up their windows to try to minimize structural damage. Valentine's Day celebrations across Taiwan were also cancelled.

On August 24, Tembin made landfall in southern Taiwan. The storm poured torrential rains, toppled trees, and caused flash flooding in several farmlands. Reportedly, 167.5 mm (6.59 in) of rain fell within one hour, the heaviest downpour in over 100 years. The local weather bureau data showed Pingtung as a whole received 724 mm (28.5 in) of rain since August 22. The typhoon dropped up to 500 millimetres (20 in) of rainfall on Hengchuen during the overnight of August 23. Hengchun also recorded its highest rainfall since 1896. However, the most heavily populated areas were spared as the storm quickly reemerged into sea. Authorities in Pingtung reported that the town of Hengchun was hit by heavy flooding, with waters reaching 3 m (9.8 ft) high in some places. Northern Taiwan was largely spared and schools and offices in the region remained open. Flights to and from southern Taiwan were also cancelled as the typhoon struck. In some parts of southern Taiwan, Tembin blew off the rooftops of many houses. The toppled trees covered busy roads leading to severe traffic jams. Police also intentionally set up roadblocks in some regions anticipating landfalls. Despite no casualties, livelihoods of farmers and poor slum-dwellers were significantly affected by the typhoon. An official of the local highway administration said that the situation would have been even worse if the highways were not blocked. On August 25, about 500 military personnel helped clean up flooded areas in Hengchun. The power outages and roadblocks were cleared by then. Also, railway services between Neishih and Fangshan which were earlier affected by the storm were restored after intensive repair work that, as the Taiwan Railways Administration claims, was done overnight.

At the same time, Taiwan forecasters warned residents that tropical storm Tembin could return early next week. Tembin was interacting with nearby Typhoon Bolaven and was expected to go around in loops, eventually making a second landfall over Taiwan. "Flooding in the Hengchun area Friday was very serious, and worse even than Morakot," said Chen Cheng-chia, a Pingtung Fire Agency official. later reports revealed that at least 5 people had been injured while the typhoon made its first landfall. Agricultural damage across the island reached NT$196.87 million (US$6.57 million).

=== South Korea ===
Following on the heels of Typhoon Bolaven, Tropical Storm Tembin brought further impacts to South Korea. Some areas received up to 150 mm (5.9 in) of rain, leading to several landslides. In Cheonan, one person was killed in a landslide. A second person was killed in Yeongam after strong winds toppled a large iron gate.

== See also ==
- Typhoon Wayne (1986)
- Typhoon Nari (2001)
