= List of storms named Kammuri =

The name Kammuri (Japanese: カンムリ, [kãmːɯɾʲi]) has been used for four tropical cyclones in the western North Pacific Ocean. The name was contributed by Japan and refers to the constellation Corona Borealis, the crown, in Japanese.

- Severe Tropical Storm Kammuri (2002) (T0212, 16W, Lagalag) - a tropical storm that killed hundreds of people in the wake of a deadly flood season in China.
- Severe Tropical Storm Kammuri (2008) (T0809, 10W, Julian) – a deadly storm that struck China and Vietnam.
- Severe Tropical Storm Kammuri (2014) (T1417, 17W) – stayed in the ocean.
- Typhoon Kammuri (2019) (T1928, 29W, Tisoy) – made landfall in the Bicol Region of the Philippines at peak intensity as a category 4-equivalent typhoon.

The name Kammuri was retired following the 2019 Pacific typhoon season and was replaced with Koto (Japanese: コト, [ko̞to̞]), which refers to the constellation Lyra, the harp, in Japanese.

- Typhoon Koto (2025) (T2527, 33W, Verbena) – a Category 1 typhoon that affected the Philippines and erratically remained off the coast of Vietnam

Preceded by Fung-wong	Pacific typhoon season names Koto	Succeeded by Nokaen
